= Cyclone Global Navigation Satellite System =

American weather satellite system

CYGNSS
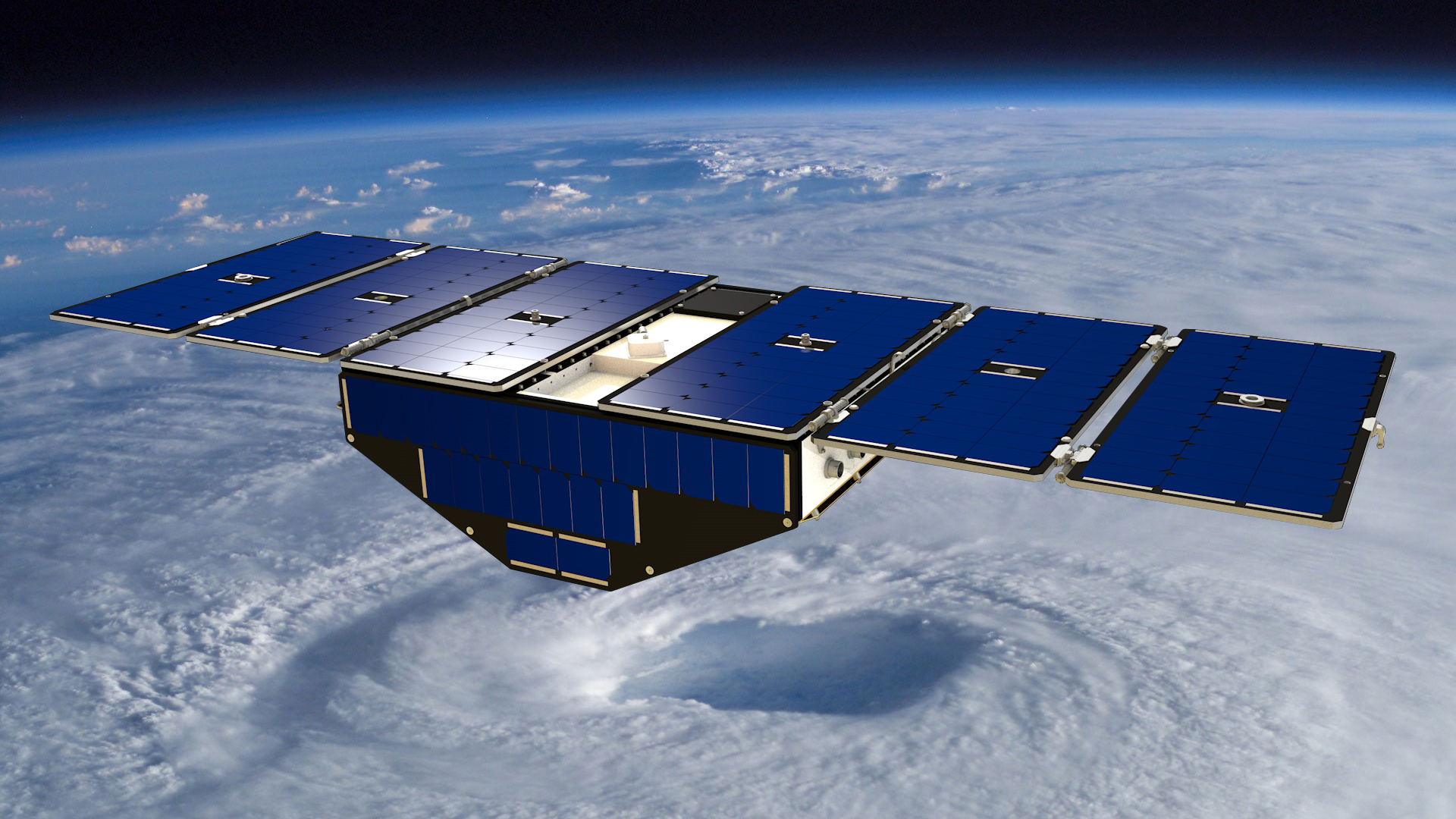
- Concept art of CYGNSS above a hurricane
- Mission type: Weather research
- Operator: NASA
- COSPAR ID: 2016-078A, 2016-078B, 2016-078C, 2016-078D, 2016-078E, 2016-078F, 2016-078G, 2016-078H
- SATCAT no.: 41884, 41885, 41886, 41887, 41888, 41889, 41890, 41891
- Website: cygnss.engin.umich.edu
- Mission duration: Planned: 2 years Elapsed: 9 years, 10 months, 23 days

Spacecraft properties
- Manufacturer: University of Michigan; Southwest Research Institute
- Launch mass: 28.9 kg (64 lb) each
- Dimensions: 163.5 × 52.1 × 22.9 cm (64.4 × 20.5 × 9.0 in) (L x W x D)
- Power: 34.7 watts

Start of mission
- Launch date: December 15, 2016, 13:37:21 UTC
- Rocket: Pegasus XL F43
- Launch site: Cape Canaveral (Stargazer)
- Contractor: Orbital ATK
- Entered service: March 23, 2017

Orbital parameters
- Reference system: Geocentric
- Regime: Low Earth
- Semi-major axis: 6,903 km (4,289 mi)
- Eccentricity: 0.00162
- Perigee altitude: 514 km (319 mi)
- Apogee altitude: 536 km (333 mi)
- Inclination: 35 degrees
- Period: 95.1 minutes
- Epoch: April 15, 2017, 22:21:25 UTC

Instruments
- Delay Doppler Mapping Instrument

The Cyclone Global Navigation Satellite System (CYGNSS) is a space-based system developed by the University of Michigan and Southwest Research Institute with the aim of improving hurricane forecasting by better understanding the interactions between the sea and the air near the core of a storm.

In June 2012, NASA sponsored the project for $152 million with the University of Michigan leading its development. Other participants in CYGNSS' development include the Southwest Research Institute, Sierra Nevada Corporation, and Surrey Satellite Technology.

The plan was to build a constellation of eight micro-satellites to be launched simultaneously in a single launch vehicle into low Earth orbit, at 500 km altitude. The program was scheduled to launch December 12, 2016, and then observe two hurricane seasons. Problems with a pump on the launching aircraft prevented this first launch, but a second launch attempt took place successfully on December 15, 2016. In 2022, one of the satellites, FM06, abruptly ceased operations.

== Overview ==
Forecasting the tracks of tropical cyclones since 1990 has improved by approximately 50%; however, in the same time period there has not been a corresponding improvement in forecasting the intensity of these storms. A better understanding of the inner core of tropical storms could lead to better forecasts; however, current sensors are unable to gather a sufficient quality of data on the inner core due to obscuration from rain bands surrounding it and to infrequent sampling. In order to improve the models used in intensity forecasts, better data are required.

CYGNSS will measure the ocean surface wind field using a bi-static scatterometry technique based on Global Navigation Satellite Systems (GNSS) signals, primarily GPS. Each satellite receives both direct GPS signals and signals reflected from the Earth's surface; the direct signals pinpoint the microsatellite position and provide a timing reference, while the reflected or "scattered" signals provide information about the condition of the sea's surface. Sea surface roughness corresponds to wind speed. Using a network of eight small satellites enables frequent observations: the mean revisit time is predicted to be 7 hours. The eight microsatellites orbit at an inclination of 35°, and are each capable of measuring 4 simultaneous reflections, resulting in 32 wind measurements per second across the globe.

CYGNSS is the first of NASA's Earth Venture-class spaceborne missions, part of NASA's Earth Science System Pathfinder program; the previous EV selections were divided among five airborne remote sensing missions. The two-year mission launched on December 15, 2016, after postponements from November 2016, and December 12, 2016.

== Science goal ==
The CYGNSS science goal is to understand the coupling between ocean surface properties, moist atmospheric thermodynamics, radiation, and convective dynamics in the inner core of a tropical cyclone. To achieve this goal, the system will measure ocean surface wind speed in all precipitating conditions, including those experienced in the eyewall. The mission will also measure ocean surface wind speed in the storm's inner core with sufficient frequency to resolve genesis and rapid intensification. As secondary goal, the project will support the operational hurricane forecast community by producing and providing ocean surface wind speed data products.

== Instruments ==
Each CYGNSS satellite carries a Delay Doppler Mapping Instrument (DDMI), consisting of:

- a Delay Mapping Receiver (DMR)
- two nadir-pointing antennas
- one zenith-pointing antenna

The instrument receives GPS signals scattered by the ocean surface for the purposes of bi-static scatterometry.

== Launch and early orbit operations ==
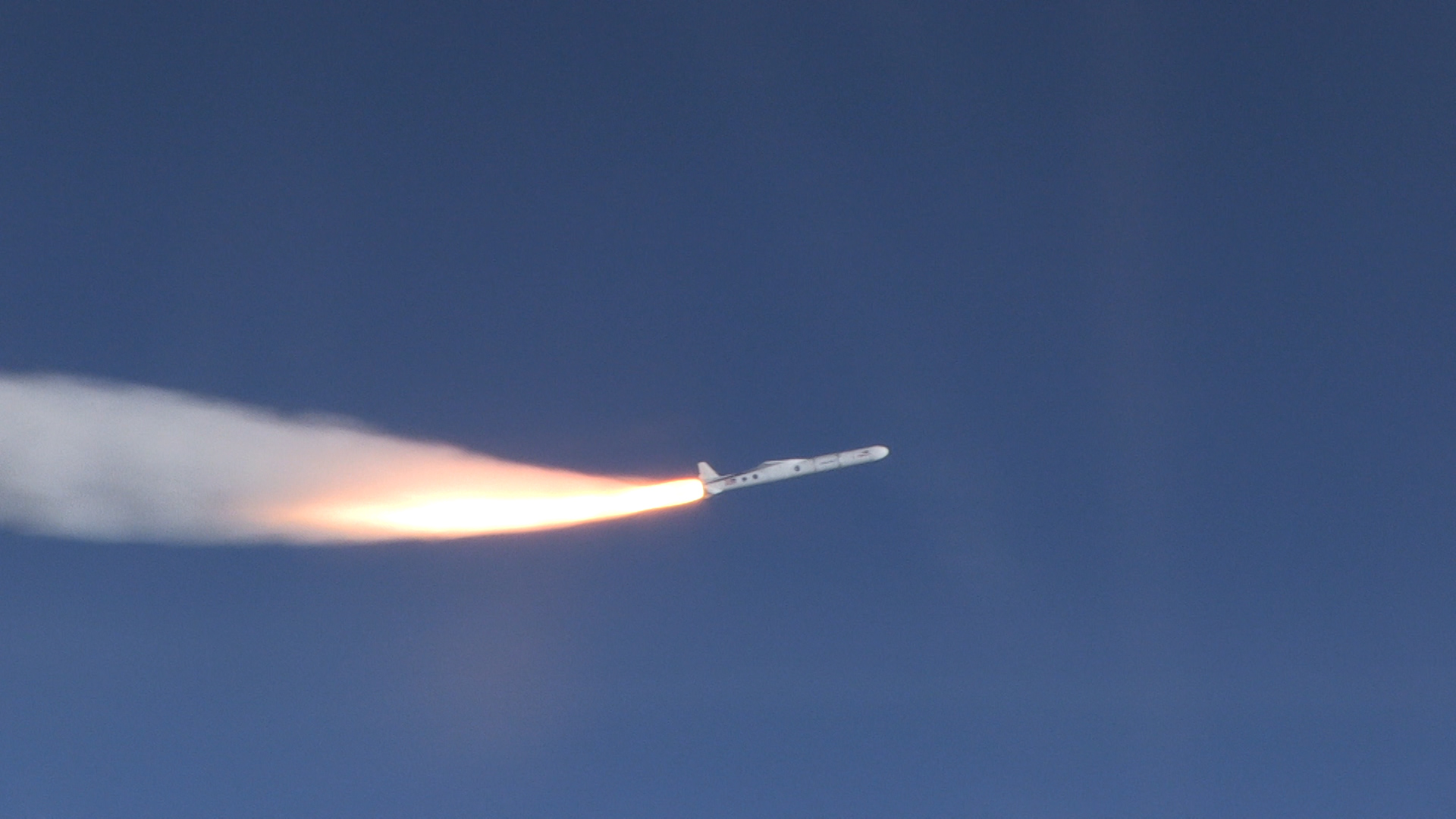
Launch of CYGNSS on a Pegasus-XL

The CYGNSS mission was launched on December 15, 2016, at 13:37:21 UTC from a single Pegasus XL air-launched rocket. The rocket was deployed from a customized Lockheed L-1011 aircraft, Orbital ATK's Stargazer, from a position 201 kilometers (125 mi) off the coast of Cape Canaveral, Florida. A launch attempt on December 12 was aborted due to problems with the hydraulic system that separates the Pegasus rocket from the carrier aircraft. After launch, the eight microsats were released into orbit beginning at 13:50 UTC and ending at 13:52 UTC by a deployment module attached to the Pegasus third stage. Successful radio contact with the first microsat was made at 16:42 UTC. The eighth microsat was successfully contacted at 20:30 UTC. By the end of the day on December 15, all eight microsats had their solar arrays deployed and were sun-pointed with batteries charging in safe condition, ready to begin engineering commissioning.

== Use of Differential Drag to Adjust Satellite Spacing ==
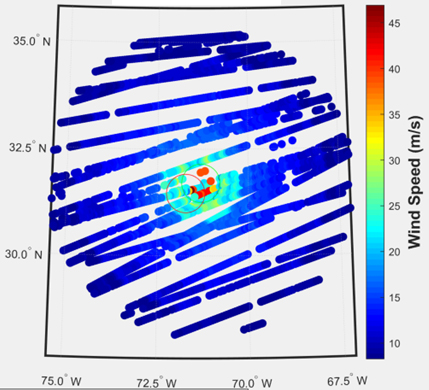
CYGNSS measurements of Hurricane Jose on September 17, 2017. The calm eye is visible inside the ring of strong winds in the eyewall.

Early mission operations focused on engineering commissioning of the satellites and adjustments to the spacing between them. Their relative spacing is important for achieving the desired spatial and temporal sampling. Inter-satellite spacing is controlled by adjusting spacecraft orientation and, as a result, the difference in atmospheric drag between satellites. This technique is referred to as differential drag. An increase in drag lowers a satellite's altitude and increases its orbital velocity. The distance between spacecraft changes as a result of their relative velocities. This is an alternate way of managing the spacing between a constellation of satellites, as opposed to using traditional active propulsion, and is significantly lower cost. It allows for more satellites to be built for the same net cost, resulting in more frequent sampling of short lived, extreme weather events like tropical cyclones. Differential drag maneuvers were conducted throughout the first year-and-a-half of on-orbit operations, and have resulted in a well-dispersed constellation that is able to make measurements with the desired sampling properties.

== Wind Observations over the Ocean ==
Wind speed measurements are made by CYGNSS in a manner analogous to that of previous spaceborne ocean wind sensing radars, by detecting changes in surface roughness caused by near surface wind stress. The quality of the measurements is determined by comparisons to nearly coincident observations by other wind sensors. Comparisons at low to moderate wind speeds (below 20 m/s, 45 mph, 72 km/h) are made to the NOAA Global Data Assimilation System numerical reanalysis wind product and indicate an uncertainty in CYGNSS winds of 1.4 m/s (3 mph; 5 km/h), with higher uncertainty at high wind speeds. Above 45 mph, and in particular for measurements made within tropical cyclones, comparisons are made to nearly coincident observations by wind sensing instruments on NOAA P-3 hurricane hunter aircraft which were flown into hurricanes in coordination with satellite overpasses by CYGNSS. The comparisons indicate an uncertainty in CYGNSS winds of 11%. As was the case at lower wind speeds, the uncertainty increases with wind speed. CYGNSS ocean wind speed measurements are currently being incorporated into hurricane numerical forecast models and storm surge models to assess the improvement in their performance. Images of recent and archival ocean wind measurements, both globally and centered on individual storms, are available at. Numerical data files of ocean wind speed measurements are available at .

== Observations over Land ==
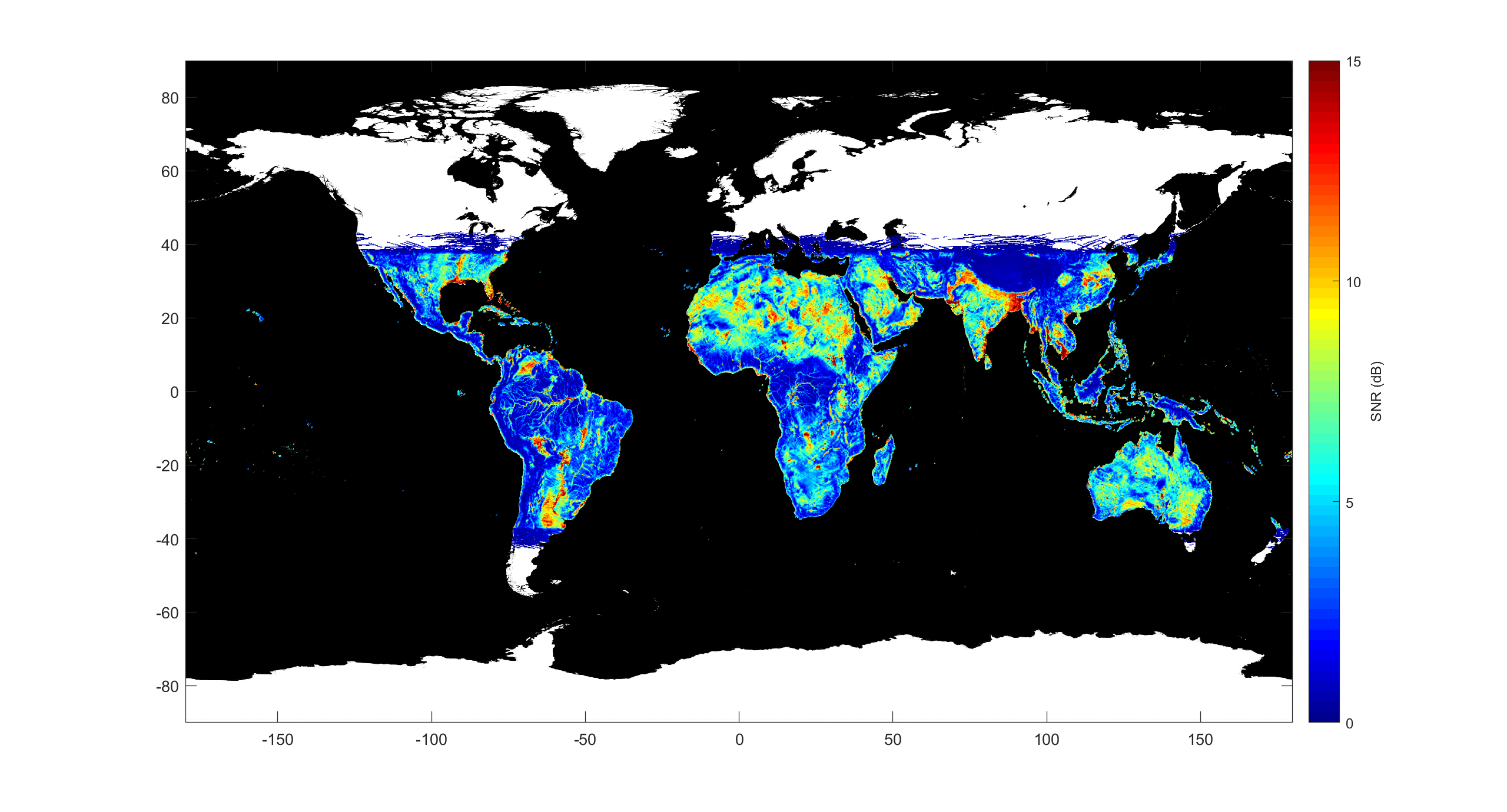
CYGNSS measurements of land surface scattering for the month of December 2017. Changes in soil moisture and the extent of inland waterways affect the measurements.

CYGNSS operates continuously, over both ocean and land, and the land measurements also contain useful information. The measurements are sensitive to surface soil moisture and to the presence and extent of inland water bodies. Soil moisture has been estimated using CYGNSS data at numerous sites in the continental U.S. and is found to be in close agreement with independent measurements made by ground sensors and by another satellite. Numerical data files of soil moisture measurements are available at . The ability of CYGNSS land data to detect and map the extent of flood inundation under dense forest canopies has also been demonstrated and this capability has been used to produce time lapse images of flooding in and around Houston and Havana after landfalls by Hurricanes Harvey and Irma, respectively.

== See also ==
- Tropical cyclone forecasting
- Tropical cyclone scales
