= Miniature Sensor Technology Integration-3 =

Satellite launched in 1996

MSTI-3
- Names: Miniature Sensor Technology Integration-3
- Mission type: Technology demonstration
- Operator: U.S. Air Force
- COSPAR ID: 1996-031A
- SATCAT no.: 23868
- Mission duration: Planned: 1 year Final: 1 year, 6 months, 24 days

Spacecraft properties
- Bus: Spectrum Astro SA-200S
- Manufacturer: Phillips Laboratory; Spectrum Astro; Wyle Laboratories; SAIC
- Launch mass: 211 kg (466 lb)
- Dry mass: 190 kg (419 lb)
- Payload mass: 52 kg (115 lb)
- Dimensions: 142 × 81 cm (56 × 32 in)
- Power: 225 watts EOL

Start of mission
- Launch date: 17 May 1996, 02:44 UTC
- Rocket: Pegasus-H F11
- Launch site: Vandenberg (Stargazer)
- Contractor: Orbital Sciences

End of mission
- Disposal: Deorbited
- Decay date: ≈11 December 1997, 14:56 UTC

Orbital parameters
- Reference system: Geocentric
- Regime: Sun-synchronous
- Perigee altitude: 420 km (260 mi)
- Apogee altitude: 432 km (268 mi)
- Inclination: 97.1 deg
- Period: 90.7 min
- Epoch: 17 May 1996

Main telescope
- Type: Ritchey–Chrétien
- Diameter: 10.5 cm (4.1 in)
- Wavelengths: SWIR: 2.5-3.3 μm; MWIR: 3.5-4.5 μm; VIS: 0.5-0.8 μm
Instruments
- MWIR Camera
- SWIR Camera
- Visible Imaging Spectrometer

Miniature Sensor Technology Integration-3 (MSTI-3) was a technology demonstration satellite operated by the United States Air Force. It was equipped with two infrared cameras and one visible light camera, designed to survey Earth's surface features and characterize their appearance in infrared wavelengths. MSTI-3 launched on 17 May 1996 aboard an Orbital Sciences Pegasus rocket.

== Spacecraft ==
MSTI-3 was a small satellite that measured 140 cm (56 in) high, 81 cm (32 in) in diameter, and 211 kg (466 lb) including propellant. Power was supplied by a single, three-faceted GaAs solar array mounted to one side of the spacecraft, providing an average of 291 watts at launch and 225 watts at end of life. A set of three reaction wheels provided attitude control, while hydrazine thrusters allowed for coarse maneuvering and momentum control. Global Positioning System equipment was added to provide enhanced orbital position information.

The spacecraft carried three instruments: a Short Wavelength Infrared Camera (SWIR), a Medium Wavelength Infrared Camera (MWIR), and a Visible Imaging Spectrometer (VIS), all sharing a single telescope. The infrared cameras each featured a seven-position filter wheel feeding into a 256×256 pixel InSb focal-plane array; the SWIR camera operated at 2.5 to 3.3 μm wavelengths while the MWIR camera operated from 3.5 to 4.5 μm. The VIS used a 499×768 pixel CCD detector operating at 0.5 to 0.8 μm. Data was stored on an 8.64 gigabit (1.08 gigabyte) experimental hard drive system, called Erasable Disk Mass Memory, before being downloaded through the Air Force Satellite Control Network.

== Overview ==
The Miniature Sensor Technology Integration program was started by the Ballistic Missile Defense Organization (BMDO) in December 1991, and was transferred to the United States Air Force by congressional direction in 1994. MSTI-3 was initiated by Phillips Laboratory at Kirtland Air Force Base. Its bus was designed and built by Phillips Laboratory, Spectrum Astro, and Wyle Laboratories, based on Spectrum Astro's SA-200S bus. The instrumentation was built by Science Applications International Corporation (SAIC). Mission management was provided by the Space and Missile Systems Center (SMC) at Los Angeles Air Force Base, while the spacecraft was controlled by SMC Detachment 2 out of Onizuka Air Force Station and later Kirtland AFB through the USAF Satellite Control Network. Operations and data processing was performed at the MSTI Payload Operations Center (MPOC), a component of the Naval Research Laboratory and managed by Analytical Services.

MSTI-3 was designed to take advantage of lessons learned from the previous two spacecraft in the MSTI program. Launched on 21 November 1992, MSTI-1 carried a single MWIR camera and met its primary objective of validating the SA-200S spacecraft bus during its six months in orbit. MSTI-2, launched on 9 May 1994, carried a PtSi SWIR camera and an InSb MWIR camera. It successfully observed a Minuteman-III missile as part of its primary objective of tracking boosting targets below the horizon, but failed in orbit after four months into its six-month mission.

MSTI-3's primary mission was to survey surface and atmospheric features of Earth in SWIR and MWIR to characterize how they vary in appearance across observational angles, times of day, and seasons. This data would be used to build statistical data to determine if it was feasible for space-based surveillance systems to track ballistic missiles in their coast phase against the warm background of Earth. The VIS instrument was used to verify the integrity of the infrared observations, and performed the secondary objective of conducting environmental monitoring at the same spatial resolution of the Landsat 5 and 6 spacecraft but with improved spectral resolution.

The launch of MSTI-3 occurred on 17 May 1996 at 02:44 UTC. The flight took place aboard a Pegasus Hybrid air-launched rocket carried by Orbital Science's Stargazer Lockheed L-1011 aircraft staged out of Vandenberg Air Force Base. Stargazer flew to the Point Arguello Warning Area Drop Zone off the coast of California and dropped the Pegasus rocket at an altitude of 12,000 m (38,000 ft). The spacecraft was deposited into a 361 by 296 km (224 by 184 mi) initial orbit and used its on-board thrusters to reach an operational orbit of approximately 425 km (264 mi).

The spacecraft had a one-year primary mission, ending in June 1997, during which it collected more than 1.2 million images of 40-meter (130 ft) resolution or better. The U.S. Air Force determined that the collected data represented a "statistically relevant set" and declared mission success. However, the spacecraft remained healthy and additional funding, primary from the U.S. Army Space and Missile Defense Command and Phillips Laboratory, continued operations through November 1997. Eventually, concerns over an uncontrolled reentry dropping components on populated places, as well as funding issues and the potential of the spacecraft failing and becoming an orbital hazard (catalyzed by the failed MSTI-2 spacecraft passing within 470 m (1,540 ft) of the Mir space station on 15 September 1997), motivated the SMD to direct MSTI-3 into a controlled reentry. ANSER, leading a team from several organizations, was directed on 10 November 1997 to create a plan for reentry; formal authorization to deorbit the spacecraft was given on 1 December 1997.

Power issues aboard MSTI-3, caused by lower-than-expected battery performance and complicated by the spacecraft entering a period of full eclipses during its orbit, forced mission controllers to begin deactivating on-board systems. This began with the infrared instruments on 29 October, GPS on 3 November, and the VIS instrument on 22 November. Even with these measures, an undervoltage event on 25 November caused the spacecraft to lose attitude control, delaying the start of deorbiting procedures. The first thruster burn took place on 2 December 1997 at 04:29:56 UTC while the spacecraft was over Hawaii, lasting 22 minutes 36 seconds and using 5.5 kg (12.2 lb) of propellant. Following the burn, additional power issues and oversaturated reaction wheels caused a loss of contact and vehicle control. Spacecraft command was reestablished by 3 December, though problems with star tracker point acquisition delayed establishment of attitude control until 11 December. Command sequences for the second and final burn had been pre-loaded onto the spacecraft, and were enacted that same day at 14:11:30 UTC. This burn was programmed to last 1 hour 40 minutes in order to burn the remaining 5.31 kg (11.71 lb) of propellant to depletion. It was predicted that the spacecraft would impact the Pacific Ocean approximately 45 minutes after the start of the burn, at around 14:56 UTC. While contact with the spacecraft was established by the Diego Garcia tracking station a few minutes after the burn started, no further contacts were made and radar observation confirmed that the spacecraft had deorbited.

== MIRACL Experiment ==
In October 1997, William Cohen, the Secretary of Defense, approved of a plan to use the MIRACL chemical laser to target the sensors on the MSTI-3 spacecraft. The experiment was carried out on October 17. The results were not successful with the Army stating that the satellite malfunctioned and did not transmit all of the data needed to evaluate the test. While the Defense Department labeled the project as a research experiment there was much controversy about the apparent development of a weapon to blind or damage satellites.
