= Advanced Photovoltaic & Electronic Experiment =

1994 satellite-based science mission

APEX
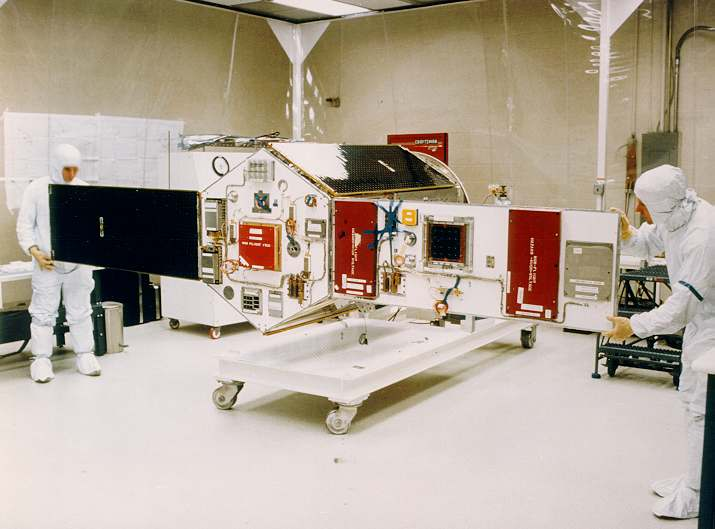
- Operator: NASA / DARPA
- COSPAR ID: 1994-046A
- SATCAT no.: 23191
- Mission duration: 1 year (design life); 3 years (target); 22 months (achieved)

Spacecraft properties
- Bus: PegaStar
- Manufacturer: Orbital Sciences
- Launch mass: 260 kilograms (570 lb)

Start of mission
- Launch date: August 3, 1994, 14:38 UTC
- Rocket: Pegasus
- Launch site: Balls 8, Edwards Runway 04/22
- Contractor: Orbital Sciences

End of mission
- Last contact: June 4, 1996

Orbital parameters
- Reference system: Geocentric
- Regime: Low Earth

Advanced Photovoltaic and Electronics Experiments, also known as APEX, was a satellite-based science mission launched into Low Earth orbit on August 3, 1994, by a Pegasus rocket. The mission successfully tested the use of photovoltaic and electronic components in space.
