= TSX (disambiguation) =

TSX is the Toronto Stock Exchange in Canada.

TSX may also refer to:

== Vehicles ==
- Acura TSX, an automobile
- Suzuki TSX, a motorcycle
- Triumph T140 TSX, a motorcycle

== Other uses ==
- TSX Broadway, a building on Times Square
- TSX Group, the TMX Group, which owns and operates stock exchanges including the Toronto Stock Exchange
- Transactional Synchronization Extensions, an extension to the x86 instruction set architecture
- Mubami language (ISO 639 code)
- .tsx, a file extension for using JSX (JavaScript)

== See also ==
- TSX-5 (Tri-Service-Experiments mission 5), a satellite
- TSX Venture Exchange (TSX-V)
- TSX-32, an operating system
