= Submillimeter Wave Astronomy Satellite =

NASA satellite of the Explorer program

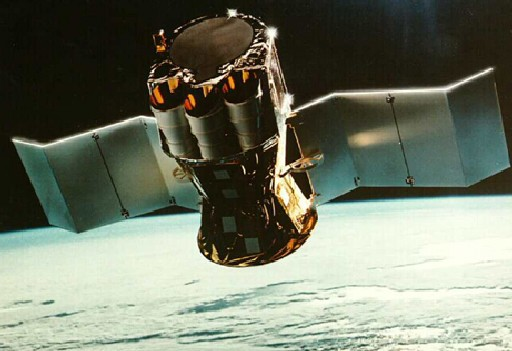
- SWAS satellite
- Names: Explorer-74; SWAS; SMEX-3
- Mission type: Submillimetre astronomy
- Operator: NASA / Goddard
- COSPAR ID: 1998-071A
- SATCAT no.: 25560
- Website: https://www.cfa.harvard.edu/swas/
- Mission duration: 2 years (planned); 6 years, 8 months and 26 days (achieved)

Spacecraft properties
- Spacecraft: Explorer LXXIV
- Spacecraft type: Submillimeter Wave Astronomy Satellite
- Bus: SWAS
- Manufacturer: Goddard Space Flight Center
- Launch mass: 288 kg (635 lb)
- Payload mass: 102 kg (225 lb)
- Dimensions: 1.63 × 1.02 m (5 ft 4 in × 3 ft 4 in)
- Power: 230 watts

Start of mission
- Launch date: 6 December 1998, 00:57:54 UTC
- Rocket: Pegasus XL (F25)
- Launch site: Vandenberg, Stargazer
- Contractor: Orbital Sciences Corporation
- Entered service: 19 December 1998

End of mission
- Deactivated: 1 September 2005

Orbital parameters
- Reference system: Geocentric orbit
- Regime: Low Earth orbit
- Perigee altitude: 638 km (396 mi)
- Apogee altitude: 651 km (405 mi)
- Inclination: 69.90°
- Period: 97.60 minutes

Instruments
- Submillimeter Wave Telescope
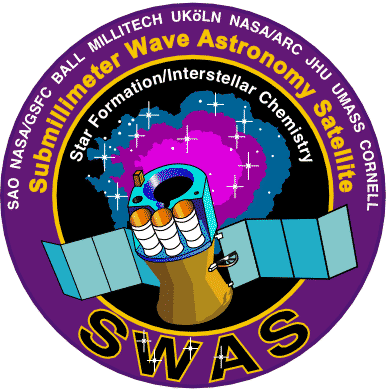
- Submillimeter Wave Astronomy Satellite mission patch SMEX program Explorer program

Submillimeter Wave Astronomy Satellite (SWAS, also Explorer 74 and SMEX-3) is a NASA submillimetre astronomy satellite, and is the fourth spacecraft in the Small Explorer program (SMEX). It was launched on 6 December 1998, at 00:57:54 UTC, from Vandenberg Air Force Base aboard a Pegasus XL launch vehicle. The telescope was designed by the Smithsonian Astrophysical Observatory (SAO) and integrated by Ball Aerospace, while the spacecraft was built by NASA's Goddard Space Flight Center (GSFC). The mission's principal investigator is Gary J. Melnick.

== History ==
The Submillimeter Wave Astronomy Satellite mission was approved on 1 April 1989. The project began with the Mission Definition Phase, officially starting on 29 September 1989, and running through 31 January 1992. During this time, the mission underwent a conceptual design review on 8 June 1990, and a demonstration of the Schottky receivers and acousto-optical spectrometer concept was performed on 8 November 1991.

== Development ==
The mission's Development Phase ran from February 1992, through May 1996. The Submillimeter Wave Telescope underwent a preliminary design review on 13 May 1992, and a critical design review (CDR) on 23 February 1993. Ball Aerospace was responsible for the construction of and integration of components into the telescope. The University of Cologne delivered the acousto-optical spectrometer to Ball for integration into the telescope on 2 December 1993, while Millitech Corporation delivered the Schottky receivers to Ball on 20 June 1994. Ball delivered the finished telescope to Goddard Space Flight Center on 20 December 1994. GSFC, which was responsible for construction of the spacecraft bus, conducted integration of spacecraft and instruments from January through March 1995. Spacecraft qualification and testing took place between 1 April 1995, and 15 December 1995. After this, SWAS was placed into storage until 1 September 1998, when launch preparation was begun.

== Mission ==
SWAS was designed to study the chemical composition, energy balance and structure of interstellar clouds, both galactic and extragalactic, and investigate the processes of stellar and planetary formation. Its sole instrument is a telescope operating in the submillimeter wavelengths of far infrared and microwave radiation. The telescope is composed of three main components: a 55 × 71 cm (22 × 28 in) elliptical off-axis Cassegrain reflector with a beam width of 4 arcminutes at operating frequencies, two Schottky diode receivers, and an acousto-optical spectrometer. The system is sensitive to frequencies between 487–557 GHz (538–616 μm), which allows it to focus on the spectral lines of molecular oxygen (O_{2}) at 487.249 GHz; neutral carbon (C i) at 492.161 GHz; isotopic water (H_{2}^{18}O) at 548.676 GHz; isotopic carbon monoxide (^{13}CO) at 550.927 GHz; and water (H_{2}O) at 556.936 GHz. Detailed 1° x 1° maps of giant molecular and dark cloud cores are generated from a grid of measurements taken at 3.7 arcminutes spacings. SWAS's submillimeter radiometers are a pair of passively cooled subharmonic Schottky diode receivers, with receiver noise figures of 2500-3000 K. An acousto-optical spectrometer (AOS) was provided by the University of Cologne, in Germany. Outputs of the two SWAS receivers are combined to form a final intermediate frequency, which extends from 1.4 to 2.8 GHz and is dispersed into 1400 1-MHz channels by the AOS. SWAS is designed to make pointed observations stabilized on three axes, with a position accuracy of about 38 arcseconds, and jitter of about 24 arcseconds. Attitude information is obtained from gyroscopes whose drift is corrected via a star tracker. Momentum wheels are used to maneuver the spacecraft.

Comparison
Name	Year	Wavelength	Aperture
Human eye	-	0.39–0.75 μm	0.01 m (0.39 in)
SWAS	1998	540–610 μm	0.55 × 0.71 m (1 ft 10 in × 2 ft 4 in)
Spitzer	2003	3–180 μm	0.85 m (2 ft 9 in)
Hubble WFC3	2009	0.2–1.7 μm	2.4 m (7 ft 10 in)
Herschel	2009	60–672 μm	3.5 m (11 ft)

== Experiment ==
=== Submillimeter Wave Telescope ===
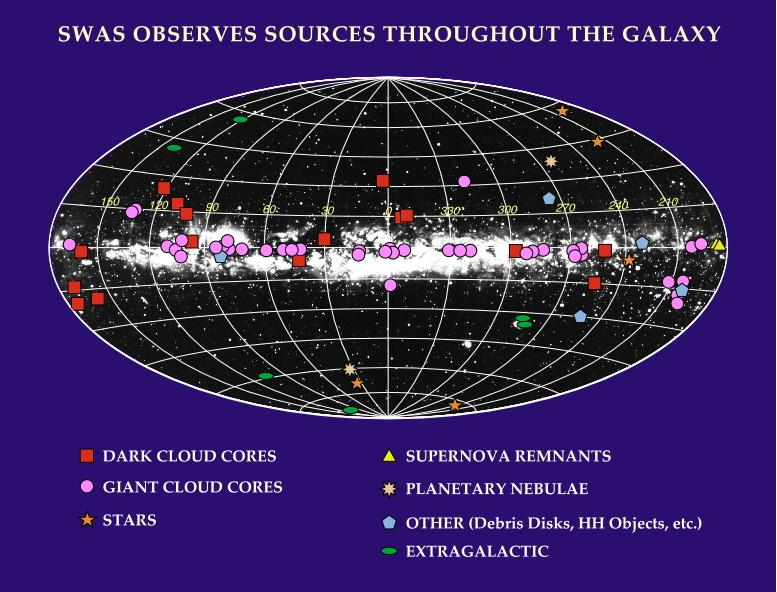
SWAS observes of sources throughout the galaxy.

The SWAS instrument is a submillimeter-wave telescope that incorporates dual heterodyne radiometers and an acousto-optical spectrometer. SWAS will measure water, molecular oxygen, atomic carbon, and isotopic carbon monoxide spectral line emissions from galactic interstellar clouds in the wavelength range 540-616 micrometres. Such submillimetre wave radiation cannot be detected from the ground because of atmospheric attenuation. The SWAS measurements will provide new information about the physical conditions (density and temperature) and chemistry in star-forming molecular clouds.

== Launch ==
The spacecraft was delivered to Orbital Sciences Corporation at Vandenberg Air Force Base on 2 November 1998, for integration onto their Pegasus XL launch vehicle. Launch occurred on 6 December 1998, at 00:57:54 UTC, from Orbital Sciences' Stargazer L-1011 TriStar mothership. Its initial orbit was a near-circular 638 × 651 km (396 × 405 mi) with an inclination of 69.90°.

SWAS was originally scheduled to launch in June 1995 but was delayed due to back-to-back launch failures of the Pegasus XL launch vehicle in June 1994 and June 1995. A launch opportunity in January 1997 was again canceled due to a Pegasus XL launch failure in November 1996.

The commissioning phase of the mission lasted until 19 December 1998, when the telescope began producing useful science data. The SWAS mission had a planned duration of two years and a cost estimate of US$60 million, but mission extensions allowed for five and a half years of continuous science operations. During this time, data was taken on more than 200 astronomical objects. The decision was made to end science and spacecraft operations on 21 July 2004, at which time the spacecraft was placed into hibernation.

== Deep Impact mission ==
To support the Deep Impact mission at comet 9P/Tempel, SWAS was brought out of hibernation on 1 June 2005. Vehicle check-out was completed on 5 June 2005 with no discernible degradation of equipment found. SWAS observations of the comet focused on isotopic water output both before and after the Deep Impact impactor struck the comet's nucleus on 4 July 2005. While water output was found to naturally vary by more than a factor of three during the observation campaign, SWAS data showed that there was no excessive release of water due to the impact event. After three months of observation, SWAS was once again placed into hibernation on 1 September 2005.

As of 2023, SWAS remains in Earth orbit on stand-by.

== See also ==
- Explorer program
