= High Energy Transient Explorer 1 =

NASA satellite of the Explorer program

- Names: HETE-1
- Mission type: High-energy astronomy
- Operator: NASA
- COSPAR ID: 1996-061A
- SATCAT no.: 24645
- Mission duration: 18 months (planned); Failed on orbit

Spacecraft properties
- Spacecraft: Explorer
- Spacecraft type: High Energy Transient Explorer
- Bus: HETE
- Manufacturer: AeroAstro, Inc.
- Launch mass: 128 kg (282 lb)

Start of mission
- Launch date: 4 November 1996, 17:08:56 UTC
- Rocket: Pegasus-XL (F14)
- Launch site: Wallops Flight Facility, LA-3
- Contractor: Orbital Sciences Corporation
- Entered service: Failed on orbit

End of mission
- Decay date: 7 April 2002

Orbital parameters
- Reference system: Geocentric orbit
- Regime: Low Earth orbit
- Perigee altitude: 487 km (303 mi)
- Apogee altitude: 555 km (345 mi)
- Inclination: 38.00°
- Period: 95.00 minutes

Instruments
- Omnidirectional Gamma-Ray Spectrometer; Ultraviolet Transient Camera Array; Wide Field X-ray Monitor

High Energy Transient Explorer 1 (HETE-1) was a NASA astronomical satellite with international participation (mainly Japan and France).

== History ==
The concept of a satellite capable of multi-wavelength observations of gamma-ray bursts (GRB) was discussed at the Santa Cruz, California meeting on GRBs in 1981. In 1986, the first realistic implementation of the HETE concept by a Massachusetts Institute of Technology MIT-led International Team was proposed. This concept, which was adopted, emphasized accurate locations and multi-wavelength coverage as the primary scientific goals for a sharply-focused small satellite mission which would ultimately solve the gamma-ray burst mystery.

In 1989, NASA approved funding for a low-cost "University Class" explorer satellite to search for GRBs. In 1992, the HETE-1 program was funded, and the design and construction of HETE-1 began. The original spacecraft contractor for HETE-1 was AeroAstro, Inc., of Herndon, Virginia. AeroAstro was responsible for the spacecraft bus, including power, communications, attitude control, and computers.

The instrument complement for HETE-1 consisted of four wide-field gamma-ray detectors, supplied by the CESR of Toulouse, France. A wide-field coded-aperture X-ray imager, supplied by a collaboration of Los Alamos National Laboratory (LANL) and the Institute of Chemistry and Physics (RIKEN) of Tokyo, Japan. Four wide-field near-UV CCD cameras, supplied by the Center for Space Research at the Massachusetts Institute of Technology.

Due to the tragic fate of HETE-1 and the continuing timeliness of GRB science, NASA agreed to a reflight of the HETE-1 satellite, using flight spare hardware from the first satellite. In July 1997, funding for a second HETE satellite was granted, with a target launch date early 2000.

== Mission ==
The prime objective of HETE-1 was to carry out the first multi-wavelength study of GRBs with ultraviolet (UV), X-ray, and gamma-ray instruments mounted on a single, compact spacecraft. A unique feature of the HETE-1 mission was its capability to localize GRBs with ~10 arcseconds accuracy in near real time aboard the spacecraft, and to transmit these positions directly to a network of receivers at existing ground-based observatories enabling rapid, sensitive follow-up studies in the radio, infrared (IR), and visible light bands.

== Spacecraft ==
The satellite bus for the HETE-1 satellite was designed and built by AeroAstro, Inc. (USA) of Herndon, Virginia. The HETE-1 spacecraft was Sun-pointing with four solar panels connected to the bottom of the spacecraft bus. Spacecraft attitude was to be controlled by magnetic torque coils and a momentum wheel.

== Experiments ==
=== Omnidirectional Gamma-Ray Spectrometer ===
The Omnidirectional Gamma-Ray Spectrometer was designed to operate from 6 keV to greater than 1 MeV. The instrument consisted of four wide-field gamma-ray detectors with a total effective area of 120 cm^{2} (19 sq in). The HETE satellite remained within the launch vehicle due to battery failure. The experiment was unable to operate.

=== Ultraviolet Transient Camera Array ===
The Ultraviolet Transient Camera Array was designed to provide accurate directional information on transient events, and to assist with spacecraft attitude determination. The instrument consisted of four ultraviolet Charge-coupled device (CCD) cameras operating in the 5 to 7 eV range.

=== Wide Field X-ray Monitor ===
The Widefield X-ray Monitor was designed to perform X-ray studies of gamma-ray bursts. The instrument consisted of coded aperture cameras, sensitive in the 2-25 keV energy range, and with location accuracy to ~ 10 arcminutes or better.

== Launch ==
Pegasus XL launch vehicle carrying the SAC-B and HETE-1 satellites.

The HETE-1 satellite was launched with the Argentina satellite SAC-B. HETE-1 was lost during the launch on 4 November 1996, at 17:08:56 UTC, from Wallops Flight Facility (WFF), launch area-3. The Pegasus XL launch vehicle achieved a good orbit, but explosive bolts releasing HETE-1 from another satellite, SAC-B, and from its Dual Payload Attach Fitting (DPAF) envelope failed to charge, dooming both satellites. A battery on the third stage of the launch vehicle and responsible for these bolts cracked during the ascent. Due to its inability to deploy the solar panels, HETE lost power several days after launch.

== Atmospheric entry ==
HETE-1 re-entered on 7 April 2002.

== See also ==
Explorer program
