= Northrop Grumman Pegasus =

Air-launched rocket

Pegasus
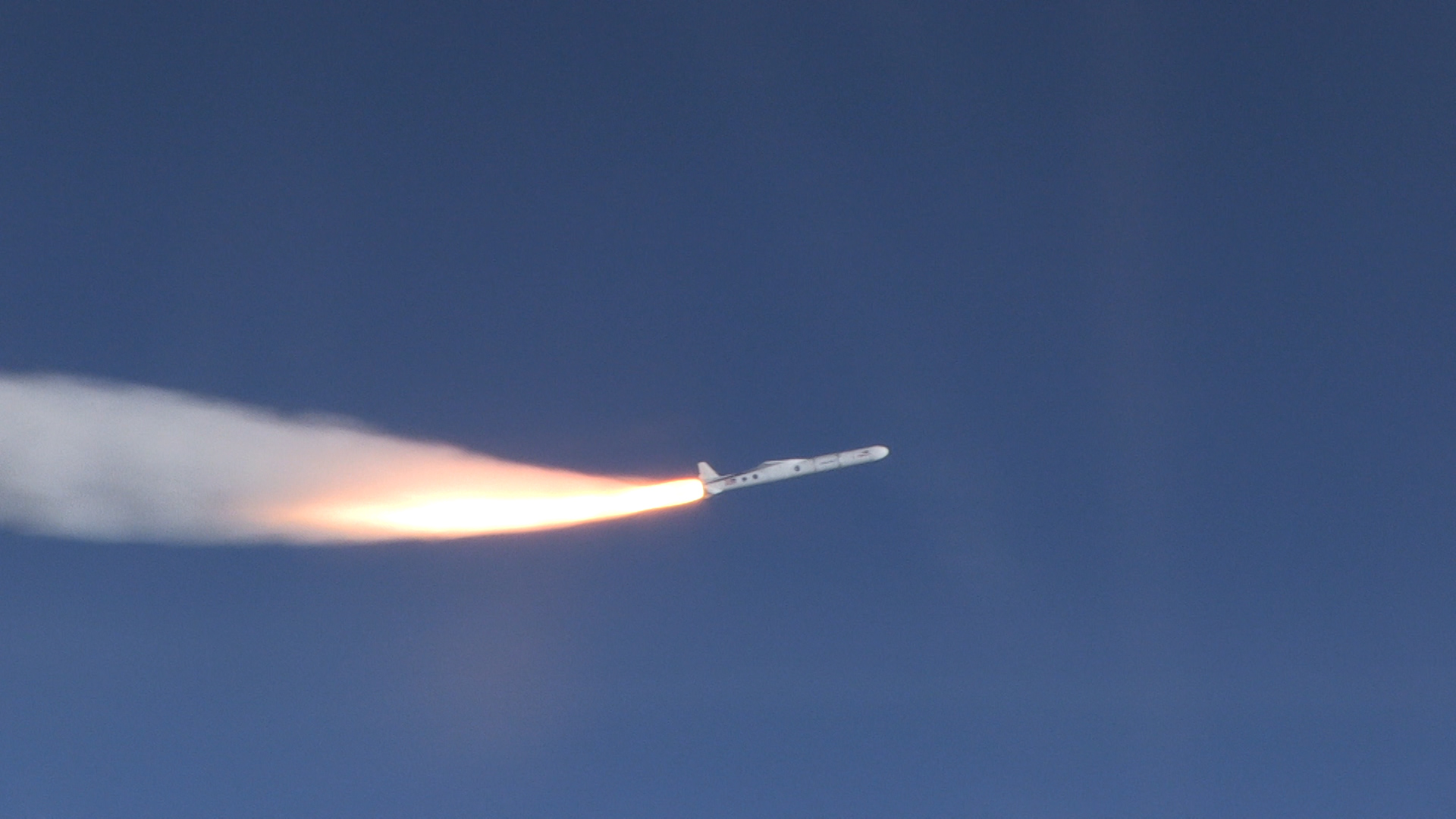
- Pegasus XL launching CYGNSS in 2016
- Function: Small-lift launch vehicle
- Manufacturer: Orbital Sciences (1990–2015); Orbital ATK (2015–2018); Northrop Grumman (2018–present)
- Country of origin: United States
- Cost per launch: US$40 million (2017)

Size
- Height: Standard: 16.9 m (55 ft 5 in); XL: 17.6 m (57 ft 9 in)
- Diameter: 1.28 m (4 ft 2 in); Wing span: 6.7 m (22 ft)
- Mass: Standard: 18,500 kg (40,800 lb); XL: 23,130 kg (50,990 lb)
- Stages: 3 or 4

Capacity

Payload to LEO
- Altitude: 200 km (120 mi)
- Orbital inclination: 28.5°
- Mass: 450 kg (990 lb)

Associated rockets
- Derivative work: Minotaur-C
- Comparable: Electron, Vector-H, Falcon 1, LauncherOne

Launch history
- Status: Retired
- Launch sites: Air launch to orbit from Cape Canaveral, Edwards, Gando, Kennedy, Kwajalein, Vandenberg or Wallops
- Total launches: 46
- Success(es): 41
- Failure: 3
- Partial failure: 2
- First flight: April 5, 1990 (Pegsat / NavySat)
- Last flight: July 3, 2026 (Swift rescue mission (LINK))

First stage (standard) – Orion 50S
- Maximum thrust: 500 kN (110,000 lb_{f})
- Burn time: 75.3 seconds
- Propellant: HTPB / Al

First stage (XL) – Orion 50SXL
- Height: 10.27 m (33 ft 8 in)
- Empty mass: 1,369 kg (3,018 lb)
- Gross mass: 16,383 kg (36,118 lb)
- Propellant mass: 15,014 kg (33,100 lb)
- Maximum thrust: 726 kN (163,247 lb_{f})
- Specific impulse: 284.6 s (2.791 km/s)
- Burn time: 68.6 seconds
- Propellant: HTPB / Al

Second stage (standard) – Orion 50
- Maximum thrust: 114.6 kN (25,800 lb_{f})
- Burn time: 75.6 seconds
- Propellant: HTPB / Al

Second stage (XL) – Orion 50XL
- Height: 3.11 m (10 ft 2 in)
- Empty mass: 416 kg (917 lb)
- Gross mass: 4,341 kg (9,570 lb)
- Propellant mass: 3,925 kg (8,653 lb)
- Maximum thrust: 196 kN (44,171 lb_{f})
- Specific impulse: 283.8 s (2.783 km/s)
- Burn time: 69.4 seconds
- Propellant: HTPB / Al

Third stage – Orion 38
- Height: 1.34 m (4 ft 5 in)
- Diameter: 0.97 m (3 ft 2 in)
- Empty mass: 126 kg (278 lb)
- Gross mass: 872.3 kg (1,923 lb)
- Propellant mass: 770 kg (1,698 lb)
- Maximum thrust: 36 kN (8,062 lb_{f})
- Specific impulse: 281.7 s (2.763 km/s)
- Burn time: 68.5 seconds
- Propellant: HTPB / Al

Fourth stage (optional) – HAPS
- Height: 0.3 m (1 ft 0 in)
- Diameter: 0.97 m (3 ft 2 in)
- Propellant mass: 72 kg (159 lb)
- Powered by: 3 × MR-107N
- Maximum thrust: 0.666 kN (150 lb_{f})
- Specific impulse: 230.5 s (2.260 km/s)
- Burn time: 131 + 110 seconds (2 burns)
- Propellant: N_{2}H_{4}

Pegasus was an air-launched, small-lift launch vehicle developed by Orbital Sciences Corporation and later built and launched by Northrop Grumman. Pegasus was the world's first privately developed orbital launch vehicle. Capable of carrying small payloads of up to 443 kilograms (977 lb) into low Earth orbit, Pegasus first flew in 1990 and last flew before its retirement in 2026. It had primarily launched scientific satellites for NASA.

The vehicle consisted of three solid-propellant stages and an optional monopropellant fourth stage. Pegasus used to be released from a carrier aircraft at about 40,000 feet (12,000 m) over open ocean, where it free-falls for five seconds before igniting its first-stage motor. The first stage did not have a thrust vectoring control system, instead using a delta wing and fins for lift and attitude control within the atmosphere. Pegasus initially used the NASA-owned B-52 Stratofortress named "Balls 8" as its carrier aircraft. By 1994, launches had transitioned to a modified L-1011 TriStar named "Stargazer" purchased by Orbital.

== History ==
Pegasus was designed by a team led by Antonio Elias (born 1949/1950). The Pegasus's three Orion solid motors were developed by Hercules Aerospace (later Alliant Techsystems) specifically for the Pegasus launcher but using advanced carbon fiber, propellant formulation and case insulation technologies originally developed for the terminated USAF Small ICBM program. The wing and fins' structures were designed by Burt Rutan and his company, Scaled Composites, which manufactured them for Orbital.

Started in the spring of 1987, the development project was funded by Orbital Sciences Corporation and Hercules Aerospace, and did not receive any government funding. Government funding was received to support operational testing. NASA did provide the use of the B-52 carrier aircraft on a cost-reimbursable basis during the development (captive carry tests) and the first few flights. Two Orbital internal projects, the Orbcomm communications constellation and the OrbView observation satellites, served as anchor customers to help justify the private funding.

There were no Pegasus test launches prior to the first operational launch on April 5, 1990, with NASA test pilot and former astronaut Gordon Fullerton in command of the carrier aircraft. Initially, a NASA-owned B-52 Stratofortress NB-008 served as the carrier aircraft. By 1994, Orbital had transitioned to their "Stargazer" L-1011, a converted airliner which was formerly owned by Air Canada. The name "Stargazer" is an homage to the television series Star Trek: The Next Generation: the character Jean-Luc Picard was captain of a ship named Stargazer prior to the events of the series, and his first officer William Riker once served aboard a ship named Pegasus.

During its launch history, the Pegasus program had three mission failures (STEP-1, STEP-2 and HETI/SAC-B), and two partial failures, (USAF Microsat and STEP-2) followed by 30 consecutive successful flights for a total program success rate of 89 percent. The first partial failure on July 17, 1991, caused the seven USAF microsatellites to be delivered to a lower than planned orbit, significantly reducing the mission lifetime. The last mission failure on November 4, 1996, resulted in the loss of gamma-burst identifying satellite HETE-1 (High Energy Transient Explorer).

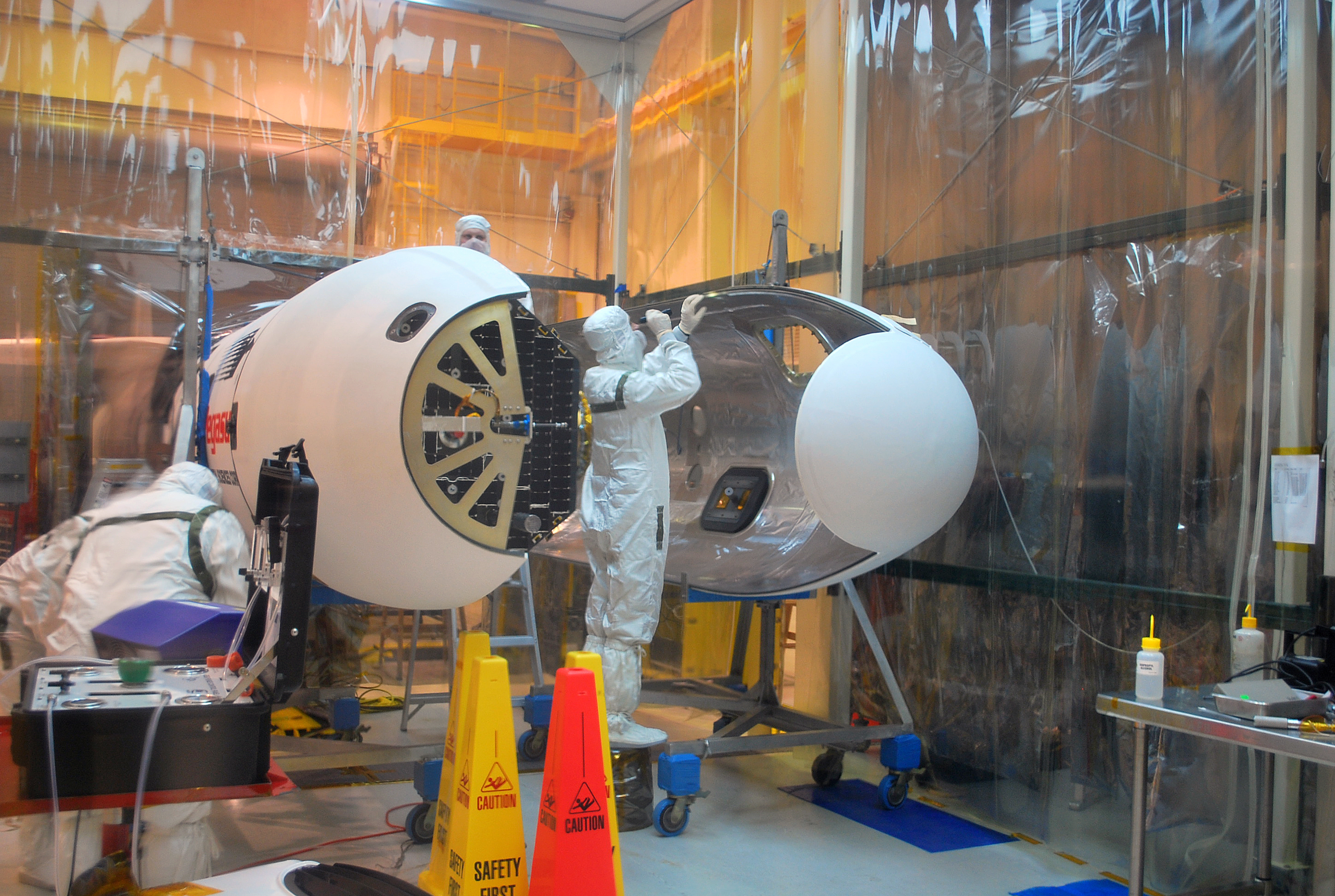
Preparations for launch of Pegasus XL carrying the NASA Interstellar Boundary Explorer (IBEX) spacecraft.

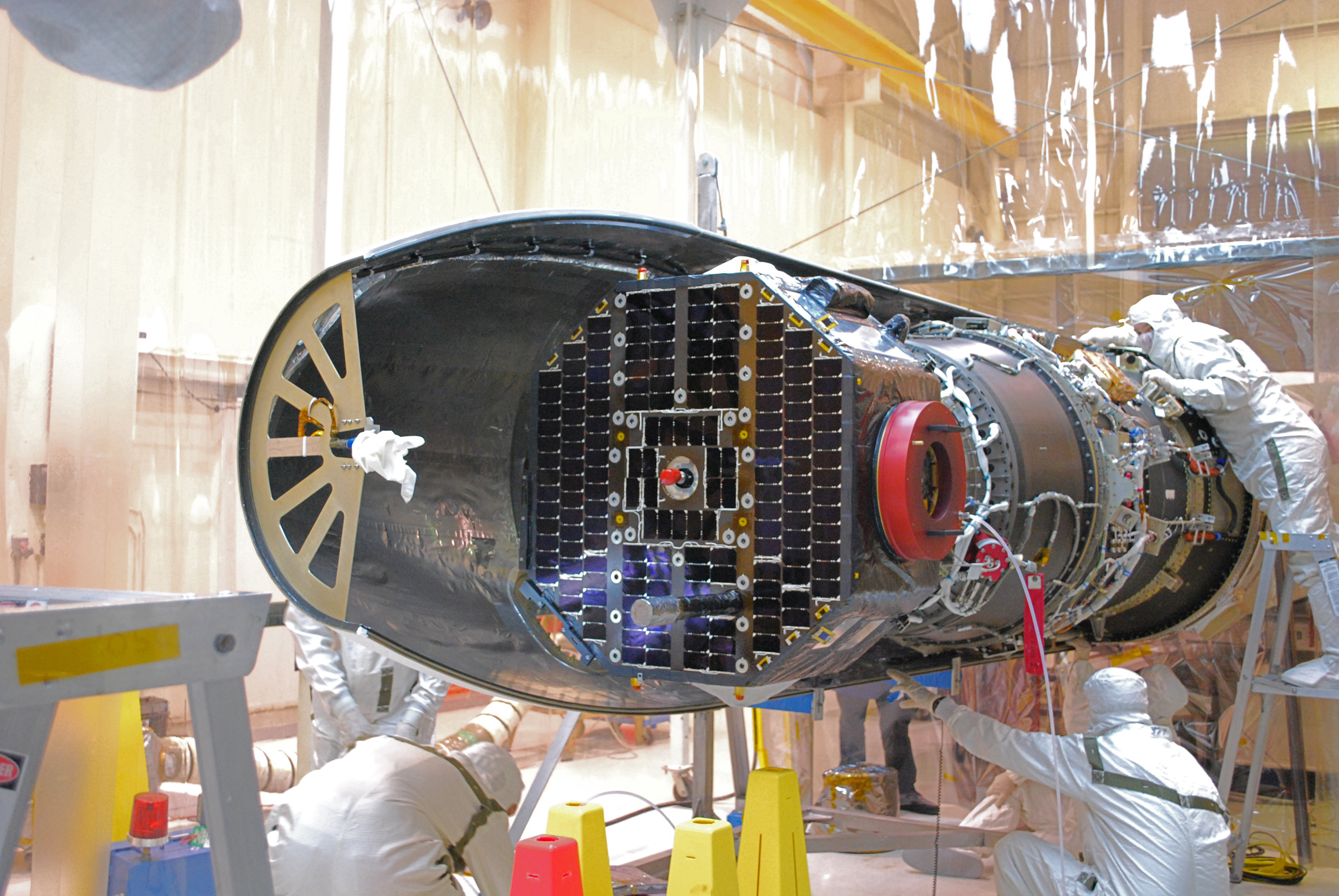
The Pegasus XL with fairing removed exposing payload bay and the IBEX satellite.

The Pegasus XL, introduced in 1994 has lengthened stages to increase payload performance. In the Pegasus XL, the first and second stages are lengthened into the Orion 50SXL and Orion 50XL, respectively. Higher stages are unchanged; flight operations are similar. The wing is strengthened slightly to handle the higher weight. The standard Pegasus has been discontinued; the Pegasus XL is still active as of 2019. Pegasus has flown 44 missions in both configurations, launching 91 satellites as of October 12, 2019.

Dual payloads can be launched, with a canister that encloses the lower spacecraft and mounts the upper spacecraft. The upper spacecraft deploys, the canister opens, then the lower spacecraft separates from the third-stage adapter. Since the fairing is unchanged for cost and aerodynamic reasons, each of the two payloads must be relatively compact. Other multiple-satellite launches involve "self-stacking" configurations, such as the ORBCOMM spacecraft.

For their work in developing the rocket, the Pegasus team led by Antonio Elias was awarded the 1991 National Medal of Technology by U.S. President George H. W. Bush.

The initial launch price offered was US$6 million, without options or a HAPS (Hydrazine Auxiliary Propulsion System) maneuvering stage. With the enlargement to Pegasus XL and the associated improvements to the vehicle, baseline prices increased. In addition, customers usually purchase additional services, such as extra testing, design and analysis, and launch-site support.

As of 2015, the most recent Pegasus XL to be purchased — a planned June 2017 launch of NASA's Ionospheric Connection Explorer (ICON) mission — had a total cost of US$56.3 million, which NASA notes includes "firm-fixed launch service costs, spacecraft processing, payload integration, tracking, data and telemetry and other launch support requirements". A series of technical problems delayed this launch, which finally took place on October 11, 2019.

In July 2019, it was announced that Northrop Grumman had lost the launch contract of the Imaging X-ray Polarimetry Explorer (IXPE) satellite to SpaceX. IXPE had been planned to be launched by a Pegasus XL rocket, and had been designed so as to fit within the Pegasus XL rocket constraints. With the IXPE launch removed from the Pegasus XL rocket, there are currently (as of October 12, 2019, after the launch of ICON) no space launch missions announced for the Pegasus XL rocket. The future (under construction as of 2019) NASA Explorer program mission Polarimeter to Unify the Corona and Heliosphere (PUNCH) was planned to be launched by Pegasus XL; but then NASA decided to merge the launches of PUNCH and another Explorer mission, Tandem Reconnection and Cusp Electrodynamics Reconnaissance Satellites (TRACERS) (also under construction as of 2019). These two space missions, consisting of 6 satellites in total, are to be launched by one launch vehicle. It is expected that a larger launcher will be chosen for this dual mission launch. In August 2022 NASA announced that the 4 microsatellites of the PUNCH constellation will be launched as rideshare payloads together with SPHEREx in April 2025 on a SpaceX Falcon 9 rocket.

Demand for the Pegasus XL declined sharply by the late 2010s and early 2020s, as most small satellites shifted to lower-cost rideshare opportunities on larger launch vehicles. Between 2016 and 2026, Pegasus XL flew only three times: 2019, 2021, and 2026.

In November 2025, Katalyst Space Technologies selected Pegasus XL to launch a rescue mission for NASA's Neil Gehrels Swift Observatory to prevent an uncontrolled re-entry. The mission required insertion into a specific low-inclination orbit not served by common rideshare launches, and smaller dedicated rockets lacked the necessary performance. The flight was the last Pegasus XL in Northrop's inventory, likely sold at a discount.

== Launch profile ==
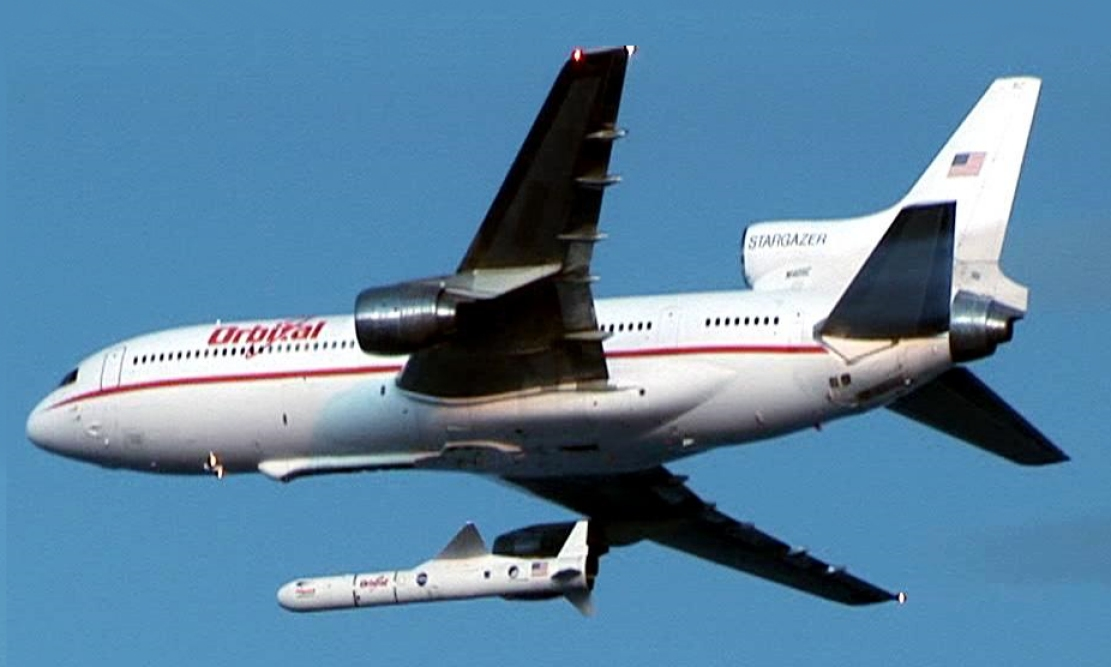
Orbital's Lockheed L-1011 Stargazer launches Pegasus carrying the three Space Technology 5 satellites, 2006

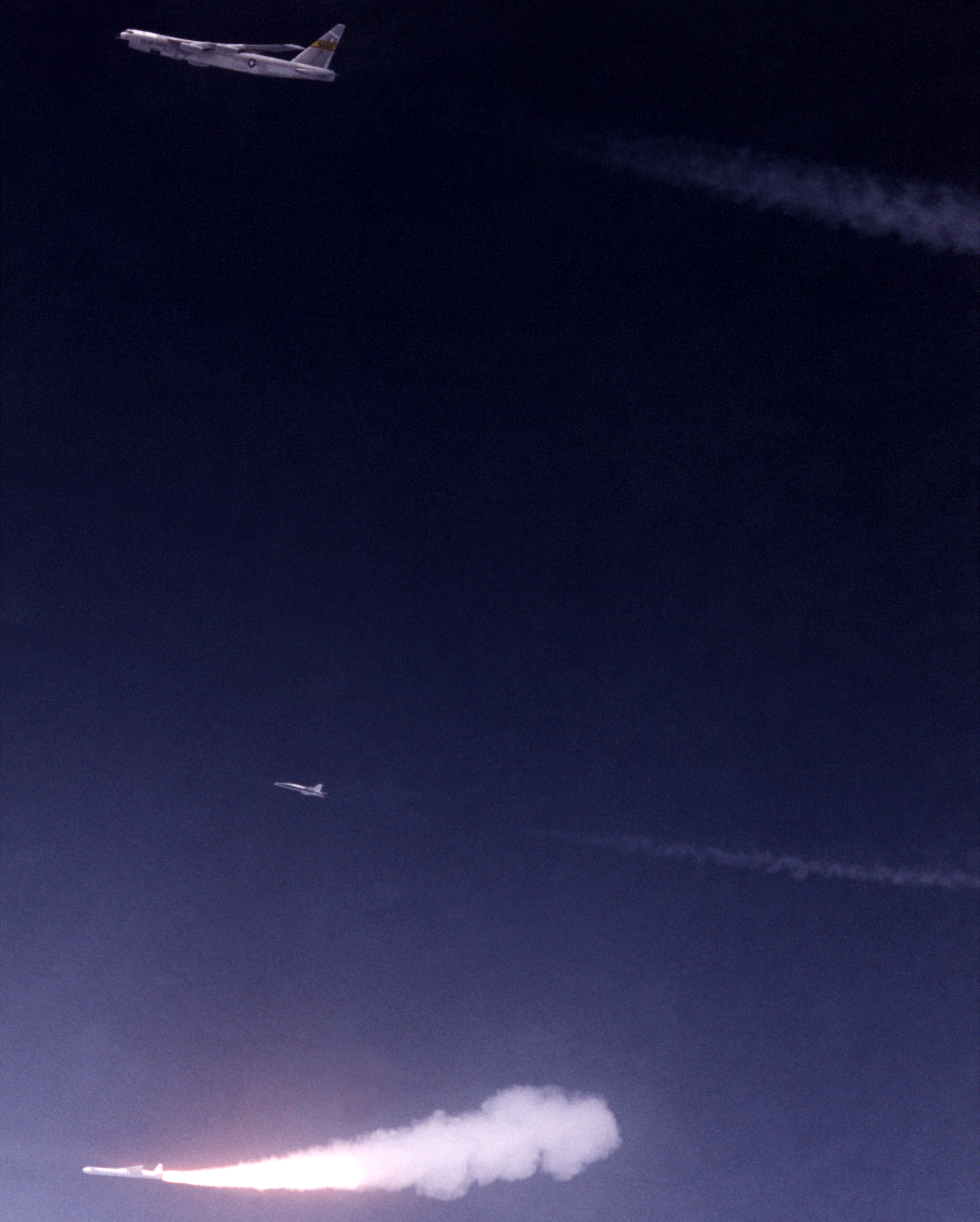
Pegasus engine fires following release from its host, a Boeing B-52 Stratofortress, 1991

In a Pegasus launch, the carrier aircraft takes off from a runway with support and checkout facilities. Such locations had included Kennedy Space Center / Cape Canaveral Air Force Station, Florida; Vandenberg Air Force Base and Dryden Flight Research Center, California; Wallops Flight Facility, Virginia; Kwajalein Range in the Pacific Ocean, and the Canary Islands in the Atlantic Ocean. Orbital offered launches from Alcantara, Brazil, but no known customers had performed any.

Upon reaching a predetermined staging time, location, and velocity the aircraft released the Pegasus. After five seconds of free-fall, the first stage ignited and the vehicle pitched up. The 45-degree delta wing (of carbon composite construction and double-wedge airfoil) aided pitch-up and provided some lift. The tail fins provided steering for first-stage flight, as the Orion 50S motor does not have a thrust-vectoring nozzle.

Approximately 1 minute and 17 seconds later, the Orion 50S motor burns out. The vehicle would be at over 200,000 feet (61 km) in altitude and hypersonic speed. The first stage falls away, taking the wing and tail surfaces, and the second stage ignites. The Orion 50 burnt for approximately 1 minute and 18 seconds. Attitude control was by thrust vectoring the Orion 50 motor around two axes, pitch and yaw; roll control was provided by nitrogen thrusters on the third stage.

Midway through second-stage flight, the launcher has reached a near-vacuum altitude. The fairing splits and falls away, uncovering the payload and third stage. Upon burnout of the second-stage motor, the stack coasts until reaching a suitable point in its trajectory, depending on mission. Then the Orion 50 would be discarded, and the third stage's Orion 38 motor ignites. It too had a thrust-vectoring nozzle, assisted by the nitrogen thrusters for roll. After approximately 64 seconds, the third stage burns out.

A fourth stage was sometimes added for a higher altitude, finer altitude accuracy, or more complex maneuvers. The HAPS (Hydrazine Auxiliary Propulsion System) was powered by three restartable, monopropellant hydrazine thrusters. As with dual launches, the HAPS cuts into the fixed volume available for payload. In at least one instance, the spacecraft was built around the HAPS.

Guidance was via a 32-bit computer and an IMU. A GPS receiver gave additional information. Due to the air launch and wing lift, the first-stage flight algorithm was custom-designed. The second- and third-stage trajectories were ballistic, and their guidance was derived from a Space Shuttle algorithm.

== Carrier aircraft ==
The carrier aircraft (initially a NASA B-52, now an L-1011 owned by Northrop Grumman) served as a booster to increase payloads at reduced cost. 12,000 m (39,000 ft) is only about 4% of a low Earth orbital altitude, and the subsonic aircraft reached only about 3% of orbital velocity, yet by delivering the launch vehicle to this speed and altitude, the reusable aircraft replaced a costly first-stage booster. Notably, the atmosphere at 39,000 feet is roughly one quarter as dense as the atmosphere at sea level, eliminating much of the drag a ground-launched rocket would experience climbing through thick air.

In October 2016, Orbital ATK announced a partnership with Stratolaunch Systems to launch Pegasus-XL rockets from the giant Scaled Composites Stratolaunch, which could launch up to three Pegasus-XL rockets on a single flight.

== Related projects ==
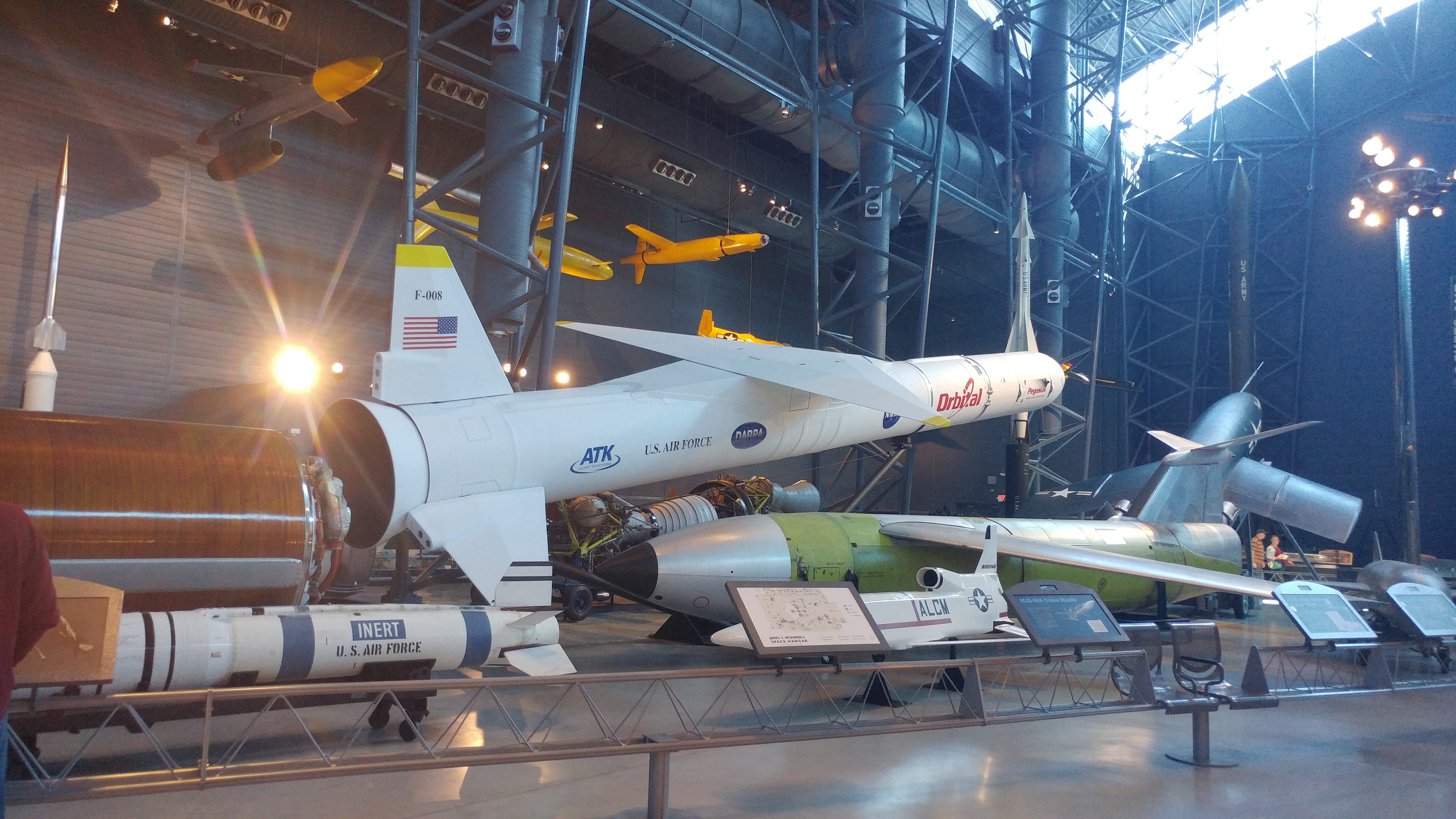
Pegasus XL at the Steven F. Udvar-Hazy Center

Pegasus components had also been the basis of other Orbital Sciences Corporation launchers. The ground-launched Taurus rocket places the Pegasus stages and a larger fairing atop a Castor 120 first stage, derived from the first stage of the MX Peacekeeper missile. Initial launches used refurbished MX first stages.

The Minotaur I, also ground-launched, is a combination of stages from Taurus launchers and Minuteman missiles, hence the name. The first two stages are from a Minuteman II; the upper stages are Orion 50XL and 38. Due to the use of surplus military rocket motors, it is only used for U.S. Government and government-sponsored payloads. This is because U.S. law forbids selling government property (like ICBM parts) for non institutional purpose.

A third vehicle is dubbed Minotaur IV despite containing no Minuteman stages. It consists of a refurbished MX with an Orion 38 added as a fourth stage.

The NASA X-43A hypersonic test vehicles were boosted by Pegasus first stages. The upper stages were replaced by exposed models of a scramjet-powered vehicle. The Orion stages boosted the X-43 to its ignition speed and altitude, and were discarded. After firing the scramjet and gathering flight data, the test vehicles also fell into the Pacific.

The most numerous derivative of Pegasus is the booster for the Ground-based Midcourse Defense (GBMD) interceptor, basically a vertical (silo) launched Pegasus minus wing and fins, and with the first stage modified by addition of a Thrust Vector Control (TVC) system.

== Launch statistics ==
=== Rocket configurations ===
- Standard
- XL
- Hybrid

=== Launch sites ===
- Edwards
- Kennedy
- Cape Canaveral
- Vandenberg
- Gando
- Wallops
- Kwajalein

=== Launch outcomes ===
- Failure
- Partial failure
- Success
- Planned

=== Carrier airplane ===
- B-52
- L-1011

== Launch history ==
Pegasus has flown 46 missions between 1990 and 2026.

Flight No.	Date / time (UTC)	Rocket, Configuration	Launch site	Payload	Payload mass	Target Orbit	Actual Orbit	Customer	Launch outcome
1	April 5, 1990; 19:10:17	Standard (B‑52)	Edwards	Pegsat, NavySat		320 x 360 km @ 94°	273 x 370 km @ 94.15°		Success
2	July 17, 1991; 17:33:53	Standard w/ HAPS (B‑52)	Edwards	Microsats (7 satellites)		389 x 389 km @ 82°	192.4 x 245.5 km @ 82.04°		Partial failure
2	A faulty pyrotechnic system caused the rocket to veer off course during 1st-stage separation, resulting erratic maneuvers that prevented the rocket reaching the correct orbit, and the mission life, planned for 3 years, was reduced to 6 months.								
3	February 9, 1993; 14:30:34	Standard (B‑52)	Kennedy	SCD-1		405 x 405 km @ 25°	393 x 427 km @ 24.97°		Success
3	In the final minute of the launch sequence an abort was called by NASA's Range Safety Officer (RSO). Despite the abort call, the launch was reinitiated by then operator Orbital Sciences Corporation's test conductor without coordination with other launch participants. Launch was completed without further issue. In an investigation led by the National Transportation Safety Board (NTSB) found that: fatigue; lack of clear command, control, and communication roles were factors that led to the incident.								
4	April 25, 1993; 13:56:00	Standard (B‑52)	Edwards	ALEXIS – Array of Low Energy X-ray Imaging Sensors		400 x 400 km @ 70°	404 x 450.5 km @ 69.92°		Success
5	May 19, 1994; 17:03	Standard w/ HAPS (B‑52)	Edwards	STEP-2 (Space Test Experiments Platform/Mission 2/SIDEX)		450 x 450 km @ 82°	325 x 443 km @ 81.95°		Partial failure
5	A software navigation error caused the HAPS upper stage to shut down early, resulting in a lower than planned, but still usable orbit.								
6	June 27, 1994; 21:15	XL (L‑1011)	Vandenberg	STEP-1 (Space Test Experiments Platform/Mission 1)		-	-		Failure
6	The vehicle lost control 35 seconds into flight, telemetry downlink lost 38 seconds into flight, range safety commanded flight termination 39 seconds into flight. The likely reason for loss of control was improper aerodynamic modelling of the longer (XL) version of which this was the first flight.								
7	August 3, 1994; 14:38	Standard (B‑52)	Edwards	APEX		195 x >1000 km @ 70.02°	195.5 x 1372 km @ 69.97°		Success
8	April 3, 1995; 13:48	Hybrid (L‑1011) (Note: The "Hybrid" Pegasus, sometimes called Pegasus H, is a Standard Pegasus that has been modified with canted fins similar to those on the Pegasus XL in order to be launched by the Stargazer carrier aircraft)	Vandenberg	Orbcomm (2 satellites), OrbView 1		398 x 404 km @ 70°	395 x 411 km @ 70.03°		Success
9	June 22, 1995; 19:58	XL (L‑1011)	Vandenberg	STEP-3 (Space Test Experiments Platform/Mission 3)		-	-		Failure
9	The interstage ring between the 1st and 2nd stages did not separate, constraining movement of the 2nd-stage nozzle. As a result, the rocket deviated from its intended trajectory and was ultimately destroyed by range safety.								
10	March 9, 1996; 01:33	XL (L‑1011)	Vandenberg	REX II		450 x 443 km @ 90°	450.9 x 434.3 km @ 89.96°		Success
11	May 17, 1996; 02:44	Hybrid (L‑1011)	Vandenberg	MSTI-3		298 x 394 km @ 97.13°	293 x 363 km @ 97.09°		Success
12	July 2, 1996; 07:48	XL (L‑1011)	Vandenberg	TOMS-EP		340 x 955 km @ 97.40°	341.2 x 942.9 km @ 97.37°		Success
13	August 21, 1996; 09:47:26	XL (L‑1011)	Vandenberg	FAST (Fast Auroral Snapshot Explorer)		350 x 4200 km @ 83°	350.4 x 4169.6 km @ 82.98°		Success
14	November 4, 1996; 17:08:56	XL (L‑1011)	Wallops	HETE-1, SAC-B		510 x 550 km @ 38°	488.1 x 555.4 km @ 37.98°		Failure
14	Failed to separate payloads because of a discharged battery intended to start separation pyros. Battery damage during launch was the likely reason. The lost payloads were the High Energy Transient Explorer (HETE) and Argentina's SAC-B satellite.								
15	April 21, 1997; 11:59:06	XL (L‑1011)	Gando Air Base	Minisat 01, Celestis space burial		587 x 587 km @ 151.01°	562.6 x 581.7 km @ 150.97°		Success
16	August 1, 1997; 20:20:00	XL (L‑1011)	Vandenberg	OrbView-2		310 x 400 km @ 98.21°	300 x 302 km @ 98.28°		Success
17	August 29, 1997; 15:02:00	XL (L‑1011)	Vandenberg	FORTE		800 x 800 km @ 70°	799.9 x 833.4 km @ 69.97°		Success
18	October 22, 1997; 13:13:00	XL (L‑1011)	Wallops	STEP-4 (Space Test Experiments Platform/Mission 4)		430 x 510 km @ 45°	430 x 511 km @ 44.98°		Success
19	December 23, 1997; 19:11:00	XL w/ HAPS (L‑1011)	Wallops	Orbcomm (8 satellites)		825 x 825 km @ 45°	822 x 824 km @ 45.02°		Success
20	February 26, 1998; 07:07:00	XL (L‑1011)	Vandenberg	SNOE, BATSAT		580 x 580 km @ 97.75°	582 x 542 km @ 97.76°		Success
21	April 2, 1998; 02:42:00	XL (L‑1011)	Vandenberg	TRACE		600 x 650 km @ 97.88°	599.9 x 649.2 km @ 97.81°		Success
22	August 2, 1998; 16:24:00	XL w/ HAPS (L‑1011)	Wallops	Orbcomm (8 satellites)		818.5 x 818.5 km @ 45.02°	819.5 x 826 km @ 45.01°		Success
23	September 23, 1998; 05:06:00	XL w/ HAPS (L‑1011)	Wallops	Orbcomm (8 satellites)		818.5 x 818.5 km @ 45.02°	811 x 826 km @ 45.02°		Success
24	October 22, 1998; 00:02:00	Hybrid (L‑1011)	Cape Canaveral	SCD-2		750 x 750 km @ 25°	750.4 x 767 km @ 24.91°		Success
25	December 6, 1998; 00:57:00	XL (L‑1011)	Vandenberg	SWAS		635 x 700 km @ 70 °	637.7 x 663.4 km @ 69.91°		Success
26	March 5, 1999; 02:56:00	XL (L‑1011)	Vandenberg	WIRE – Wide Field Infrared Explorer		540 x 540 km @ 97.56°	539 x 598 km @ 97.53°		Success
27	May 18, 1999; 05:09:00	XL w/ HAPS (L‑1011)	Vandenberg	Terriers, MUBLCOM		550 x 550 km @ 97.75°, 775 x 775 km @ 97.75°	551 x 557 km @ 97.72°, 774 x 788 km @ 97.72°		Success
28	December 4, 1999; 18:53:00	XL w/ HAPS (L‑1011)	Wallops	Orbcomm (7 satellites)		825 x 825 km @ 45.02°	826.5 x 829 km @ 45.02°		Success
29	June 7, 2000; 13:19:00	XL (L‑1011)	Vandenberg	TSX-5 (Tri-Service-Experiments mission 5)		405 x 1.750 km @ 69°	409.9 x 1,711.7 km @ 68.95°		Success
30	October 9, 2000; 05:38:00	Hybrid (L‑1011)	Kwajalein Atoll	HETE-2		600 x 650 km @ 2°	591.9 x 651.9 km @ 1.95°		Success
31	February 5, 2002; 20:58:00	XL (L‑1011)	Cape Canaveral	RHESSI		600 x 600 km @ 38°	586.4 x 602 km @ 38.02°		Success
32	January 25, 2003; 20:13:00	XL (L‑1011)	Cape Canaveral	SORCE		645 x 645 km @ 40°	622.3 x 647.3 km @ 39.999°		Success
33	April 28, 2003; 11:59:00	XL (L‑1011)	Cape Canaveral	GALEX – Galaxy Evolution Explorer		690 x 690 km @ 29°	689.8 x 711.3 km @ 28.99°		Success
34	June 26, 2003; 18:53:00	XL (L‑1011)	Vandenberg	OrbView-3		369 x 470 km @ 97.29°	367.1 x 440.5 km @ 97.27°		Success
35	August 13, 2003; 02:09:00	XL (L‑1011)	Vandenberg	SCISAT-1		650 x 650 km @ 73.92°	647.9 x 659.7 km @ 73.95°		Success
36	April 15, 2005; 17:26:00	XL w/ HAPS (L‑1011)	Vandenberg	DART		538.7 x 566.7 km @ 97.73°	541.2 x 548.8 km @ 97.73°		Success
37	March 22, 2006; 14:03:00	XL (L‑1011)	Vandenberg	ST-5 – Space Technology 5 (3 satellites)		300 x 4500 km @ 105.6°	301.1 x 4571 km @ 105.62°		Success
38	April 25, 2007; 20:26:00	XL (L‑1011)	Vandenberg	AIM – Aeronomy of Ice in the Mesosphere	197 kg (434 lb)	600 x600 km @ 97.77°	601.3 x 596.2 km @ 97.79°	NASA	Success
39	April 16, 2008; 17:02:00	XL (L‑1011)	Kwajalein Atoll	C/NOFS	384 kg (847 lb)	400 x 850 km @ 13°	401 x 868 km @ 12.99°	STP / AFRL / DMSG	Success
40	October 19, 2008; 17:47:23	XL (L‑1011)	Kwajalein Atoll	IBEX – Interstellar Boundary Explorer	107 kg (236 lb)	207 x 412 km @11°	206.4 x 445 km @ 10.99°	NASA	Success
41	June 13, 2012; 16:00:00	XL (L‑1011)	Kwajalein Atoll	NuSTAR – Nuclear Spectroscopic Telescope Array	350 kg (770 lb)	≥530 x ≤660 km @ 5 – 7°	621.2 x 638.5 km @ 6.024°	NASA / JPL	Success
42	June 28, 2013; 02:27:46	XL (L‑1011)	Vandenberg	IRIS – Interface Region Imaging Spectrograph SMEX	183 kg (403 lb)	≥620 x ≤670 km @97.89°	622.9 x 669.3 km @ 97.894°	NASA	Success
43	December 15, 2016; 13:37:00	XL (L‑1011)	Cape Canaveral	Cyclone Global Navigation Satellite System (CYGNSS)	345.6 kg (762 lb)	510 x 6888 km @ 35°	511.5 x 6908.1 km @ 34.97°	NASA	Success
44	October 11, 2019; 01:59:05	XL (L‑1011)	Cape Canaveral	Ionospheric Connection Explorer (ICON)	281 kg (619 lb)	590 × 607 km (367 × 377 mi)	608.4 × 571.6 km (378.0 × 355.2 mi) @ 26.98°	UC Berkeley SSL / NASA	Success
45	June 13, 2021; 08:11	XL (L‑1011)	Vandenberg	TacRL-2 (Odyssey)	325 kg (717 lb)			U.S. Space Force	Success
46	July 3, 2026 08:36	XL (L‑1011)	Kwajalein Atoll	Swift rescue mission (LINK)	400 kg (880 lb)	~400 × 400 km (250 × 250 mi) @ 20.6°		Katalyst Space Technologies	Success
46	Katalyst Link spacecraft would be used for a rescue mission for NASA's Neil Gehrels Swift Observatory to prevent an uncontrolled re-entry. Last Pegasus rocket launch.								

== See also ==
- Air launch to orbit
- Comparison of orbital launchers families
- Comparison of orbital launch systems
- Pegasus II (rocket)
