= FORTE =

United States nuclear detonation detection satellite

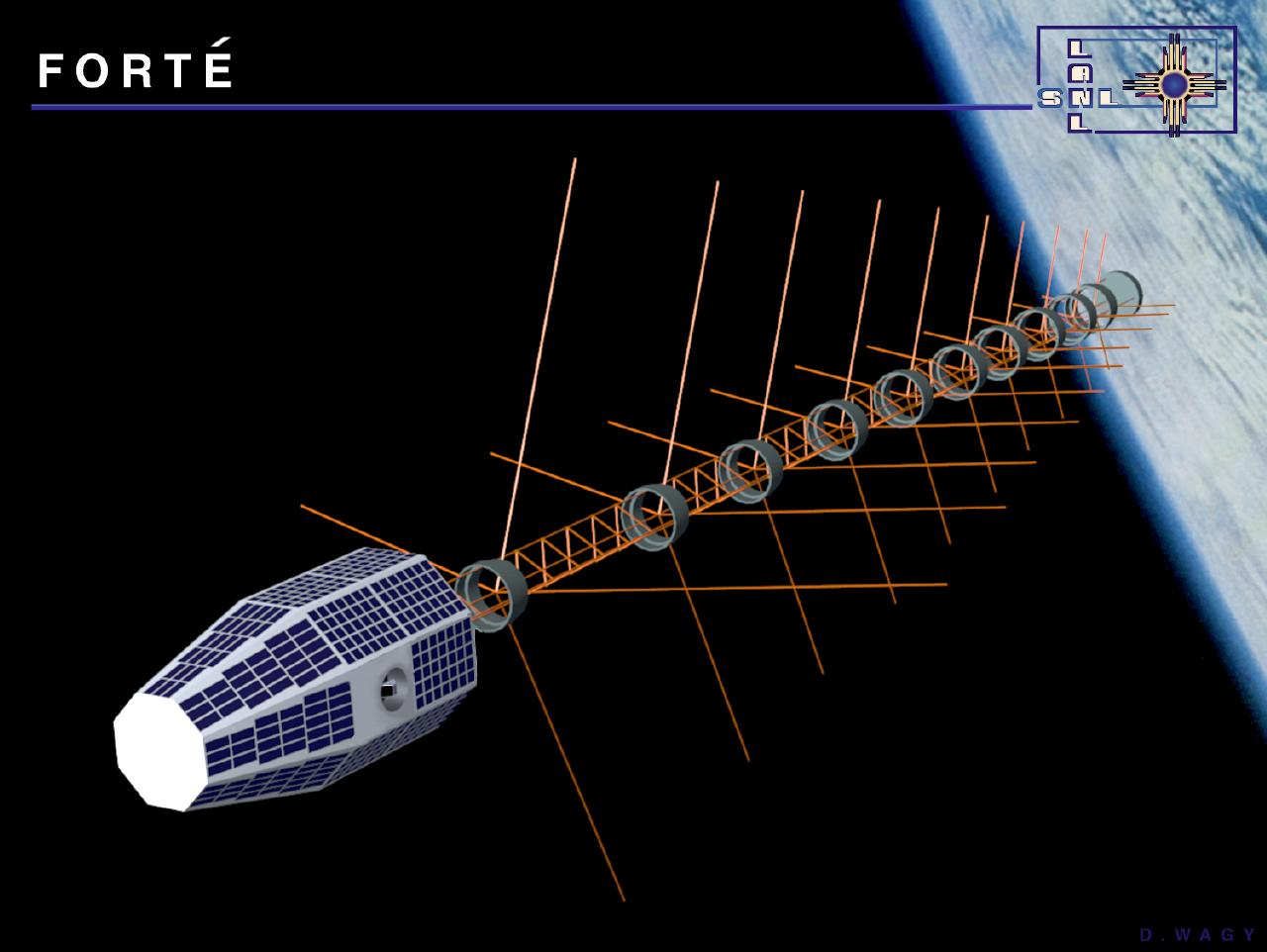
Fast On-orbit Rapid Recording of Transient Events

The Fast On-orbit Rapid Recording of Transient Events (FORTE, occasionally stylized as FORTÉ; COSPAR 1997-047A, SATCAT 24920) is a lightweight satellite which was launched at about 8:30 AM on August 29, 1997 into a circular 800-kilometer (500 mi) low Earth orbit which is inclined 70 degrees relative to the Earth's equator, using a Pegasus XL rocket. It was developed and launched by the Los Alamos National Laboratory in cooperation with Sandia National Laboratory, as a testbed for technologies applicable to U.S. nuclear detonation detection systems used to monitor compliance with arms control treaties, and later to study lightning from space. The project was sponsored by the United States Department of Energy, and cost about US$35 million. It utilizes optical sensors, RF sensors, and an "event classifier" in order to make observations, including monitoring Very High Frequency (VHF) lightning emissions in the ionosphere occurring from between 50 to 600 miles (80 to 966 km) above the surface of the Earth, and it will be a component of the VHF Global Lightning and Severe Storm Monitor (V-GLASS) system. Its primary mission is to record and analyze bursts of RF energy rising from the surface of the Earth. FORTE is 7-foot (2.1 m) tall, weighs 470-pound (210 kg), and is the first all-composite spacecraft, its framework being made entirely of graphite-reinforced epoxy. It consists of three decks with aluminum honeycomb cores, and composite facing to support the onboard instruments.
