= TSX-5 =

TSX-5 (Tri-Service-Experiments mission 5, COSPAR 2000-030A, SATCAT 26374) is an $85 million satellite successfully launched into orbit on June 7, 2000, from Vandenberg Air Force Base on a Pegasus XL rocket.

TSX-5 hosts two Department of Defense (DOD) payloads, STRV-2 (the Space Test Research Vehicle-2), sponsored by the Ballistic Missile Defense Organization, and CEASE (the Compact Environmental Anomaly Sensor), sponsored by the Air Force's Phillips Geophysics Laboratory. TSX-5 is managed by the Space Technology Program (STP) at the Space and Missiles Centre, Test and Evaluation (SMC/TELS) at Kirtland Air Force Base, New Mexico.
