= Space Technology 5 =

Experimental space technologies

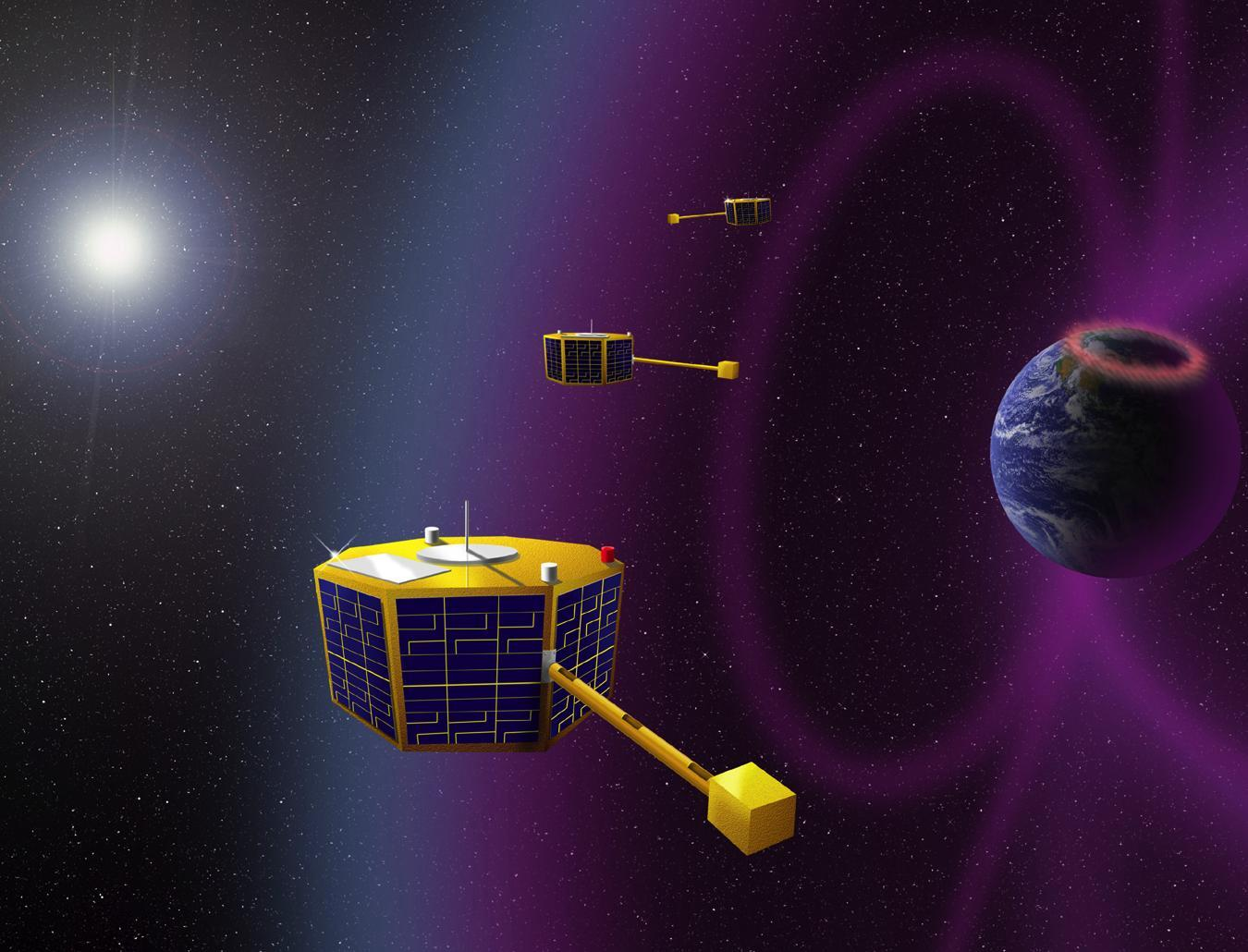
- Artist's rendering of the "string of pearls" satellite constellation
- Operator: NASA / GSFC
- COSPAR ID: 2006-008A through 2006-008C
- SATCAT no.: 28980 through 28982
- Website: nmp.jpl.nasa.gov/st5
- Mission duration: 20 years, 6 months and 4 days (in orbit)

Spacecraft properties
- Manufacturer: UCLA; Kennedy Space Center; New Mexico State University Physical Science Laboratory
- Launch mass: 25 kilograms (55 lb)
- Power: ≈20–25 W @ 9–10 V

Start of mission
- Rocket: Pegasus XL

End of mission
- Deactivated: June 30, 2006

Orbital parameters
- Reference system: Geocentric
- Regime: Sun synchronous
- Eccentricity: 0.239
- Perigee altitude: 300 km (190 mi)
- Apogee altitude: 4,500 km (2,800 mi)
- Inclination: 105.6°

Transponders
- Band: X-Band
- Bandwidth: 1 Kbps / 1 or 100 Kbps

Space Technology 5 (ST5) of the NASA New Millennium program was a test of ten new technologies aboard a group of microsatellites. Developed by NASA Goddard Space Flight Center, the three individual small spacecraft were launched together from the belly of a Lockheed L-1011 aboard the Pegasus XL rocket, on 22 March 2006. One technology involved antennas that were designed by computers using an evolutionary algorithm system developed at NASA Ames Research Center. The ST5 on-board flight computer, the C&DH (Command & Data Handling) system, was based on a Mongoose-V radiation-hardened microprocessor.

On 30 June 2006 the satellites making up ST5 were shut down after successfully completing their technology validation mission.

== Mission objectives ==
ST5's objective was to demonstrate and flight qualify several innovative technologies and concepts for application to future space missions.

Communications Components for Small Spacecraft
The X-Band Transponder Communications System was provided by AeroAstro. The transponder system is a miniaturized digital communications transponder. It provides coherent uplink-to-downlink operation that provides a ground-to-space command capability, space-to-ground telemetry capability, and a radio frequency tracking capability. The X-Band weighs approximately 1/12 as much and is 1/9 the volume of communications systems used in other missions.

Evolved antenna
A supercomputer using an artificial evolution algorithm designed a very tiny, highly unlikely looking, but highly promising communication antenna for the ST5 spacecraft. The radiator was designed by NASA Ames and the antenna itself was implemented by the Physical Science Laboratory at New Mexico State University. (As a note, each spacecraft has two X-band antennas: an evolved (the solid black painted unit) and a quadrifilar helix antenna (the two-toned, black and white unit). The quadrifilar helix antennas were also developed at the NMSU Physical Science Laboratory.)

Lithium-Ion Power System for Small Satellites
The Low-Voltage Power System uses a low-weight Li-ion battery that can store up to four times as much energy as a Ni-Cad battery, charged by triple junction solar cells. The Li-Ion rechargeable battery has a longer life and exhibits no memory effect.

Ultra Low-Power Demonstration
The CULPRiT is a new type of microelectronic device that allows circuits to operate at 0.5 Volts. The technology will greatly reduce power consumption while achieving a radiation tolerance of ~100 kRad total dose and latch-up immunity.

Variable Emittance Coatings for Thermal Control
The Variable Emittance Coatings, provided by Sensortex, Inc. and the Applied Physics Laboratory (APL), are used for thermal control and consist of an electrically tunable coating that can change properties, from absorbing heat when cool to reflecting or emitting heat when in the Sun. The Microelectromechanical System (MEMS) chip is part of this technology.

Propulsion Systems Components
A miniature microthruster that provides fine attitude adjustments on the spacecraft. The Cold Gas Microthruster (CGMT) is a tiny electromechanical system designed by Marotta Scientific Controls, Inc. to provide fine attitude adjustments on each of the micro-sats. It uses 1/8 the power and weighs only half as much as attitude control systems being used in other missions.

Miniature magnetometer
Miniature spinning Sun sensor
Spacecraft deployment mechanism
Magnetometer deployment boom
Nutation dampe

== See also ==
- List of spaceflights (2006)
