= Stargazer (aircraft) =

L-1011 modified to carry rockets

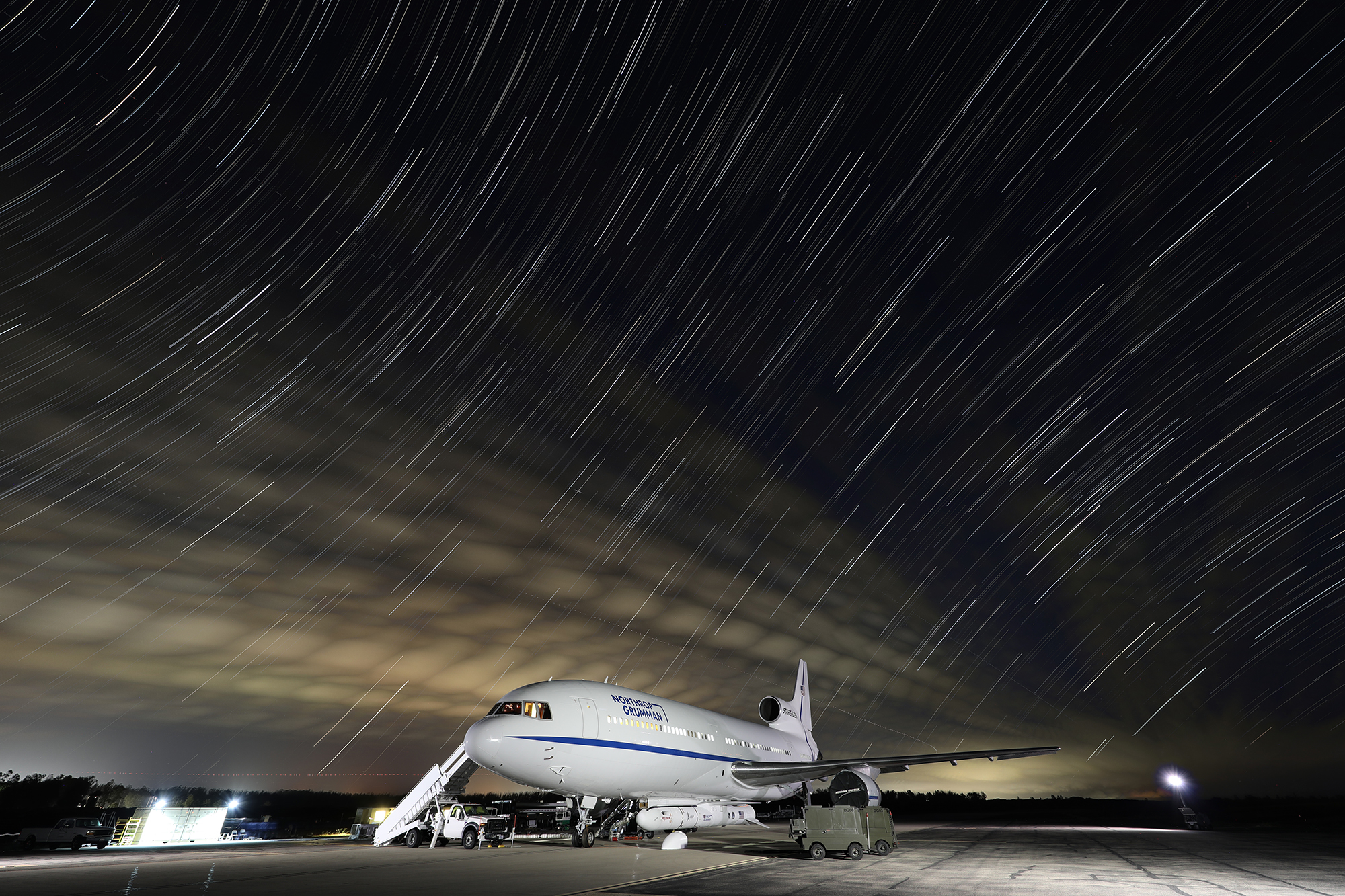
- Stargazer carrying the Pegasus XL in 2021

General information
- Type: Lockheed L-1011 TriStar
- Status: In service
- Owners: Air Canada (1974‍–‍1990); Orbital Sciences (1992‍–‍2015); Orbital ATK (2015‍–‍2018); Northrop Grumman (2018‍–‍present)
- Construction number: 193E-1067
- Registration: C-FTNJ (1974–1992); N140SC (1992–present)

History
- First flight: February 22, 1974
- In service: 1974–present

Stargazer is a Lockheed L-1011 TriStar built in 1974 and modified in 1994 by Orbital Sciences (now part of Northrop Grumman) to serve as the mother ship for the Pegasus, an air-launched orbital rocket. As of June 2021, it has conducted 39 Pegasus launches carrying nearly 100 satellites. It is the only airworthy L-1011 remaining in service as of 2026 because its FAA-approved launch license was valid until March 9, 2026. It received an "Emergency Special Permit Authorization" on March 20, 2026 for "immediate national security purposes" to enable the Swift boost mission launch.

Stargazer supported the final Pegasus launch in 2026, launching the LINK spacecraft to boost the orbit of NASA's Swift spacecraft. Stargazer also continues to fly regular missions for undisclosed customers, including missile and flight-test work.

== History ==
The aircraft is an L-1011-100, the second production variant of the TriStar, which incorporated a new center fuel tank and higher gross weights that increased its range over the initial L-1011-1. It carries Lockheed construction number 1067. The airframe first entered service with Air Canada in March 1974 as C-FTNJ, and was briefly leased to Air Lanka for a few weeks in February 1982, during which it was registered as 4R-TNJ. Air Canada placed the aircraft into storage at Marana in November 1990.

Orbital Sciences purchased the airframe in May 1992 and contracted Marshall Aerospace in the United Kingdom to modify it as the carrier aircraft for the Pegasus air-launched orbital vehicle. Before selecting the L-1011, the company evaluated alternatives including the Boeing B-52, Boeing 747, and DC-10, comparing altitude and speed performance, modification requirements, and overall operating costs.

The name Stargazer is considered an inside joke: in Star Trek: The Next Generation, First Officer William Riker previously served aboard a starship named Pegasus, while Captain Jean-Luc Picard had earlier served aboard a starship named Stargazer.

Stargazer supported its first Pegasus mission on June 27, 1994, during the maiden flight of the Pegasus XL. Earlier Pegasus launches used NASA's B-52 "Balls 8", which remained in use for several missions because the original Pegasus design lacked sufficient clearance to be deployed from the L-1011. The "Hybrid" Pegasus variant introduced in April 1995 resolved this issue, by placing canted fins similar to those on the Pegasus XL on the Standard Pegasus, allowing all subsequent flights to be carried by Stargazer.

About half of all Pegasus launches carried by Stargazer have originated from Vandenberg Space Force Base in California. Additional missions have been flown from Florida's Cape Canaveral and Kennedy Space Center, Wallops Flight Facility in Virginia, and from overseas sites including Kwajalein Atoll in the Marshall Islands and Gando Air Base in Spain.

Stargazer is also periodically chartered for research missions and flight-test activities unrelated to Pegasus. It can carry a 51,000-pound (23,000 kg) payload to an altitude of 42,000 feet (13,000 m).

In 2010, the aircraft was re-engined with Rolls-Royce RB.211-524 turbofans, which had been designed for the improved L-1011-500, which generate 50,000 pounds-force (220 kN) of thrust, replacing the original RB.211-22 engines which generated 42,000 pounds-force (190 kN). The aircraft was repainted in 2015 following the formation of Orbital ATK, and again in 2018 after the company was acquired by Northrop Grumman.

Since 2016, Pegasus has launched four times, most recently on the LINK mission in July 2026. Despite the long gap, Northrop Grumman has stated that both Pegasus and Stargazer remain flight-ready. Company officials have noted that the aircraft may be the last airworthy L-1011 still flying, which has allowed the operator to obtain spare parts at unusually favorable prices. Stargazer has continued to fly regular missions for undisclosed customers involving missile and flight-test work. Katalyst Space Technologies selected the Pegasus XL platform for the Swift reboost mission. The launch occurred at 8:36 p.m Marshall Islands Time (4:36 a.m. EDT), Friday, July 3, from Kwajalein Atoll in the South Pacific Ocean..

== Gallery ==
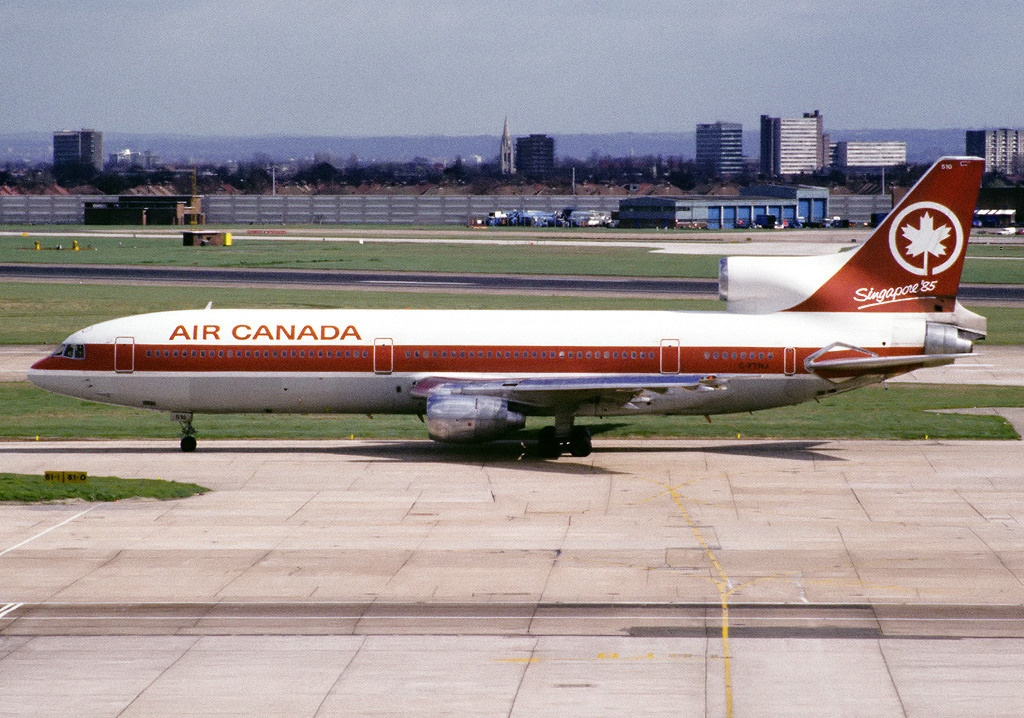
The Stargazer aircraft when it was in passenger service for Air Canada, pictured in London (April 1985)

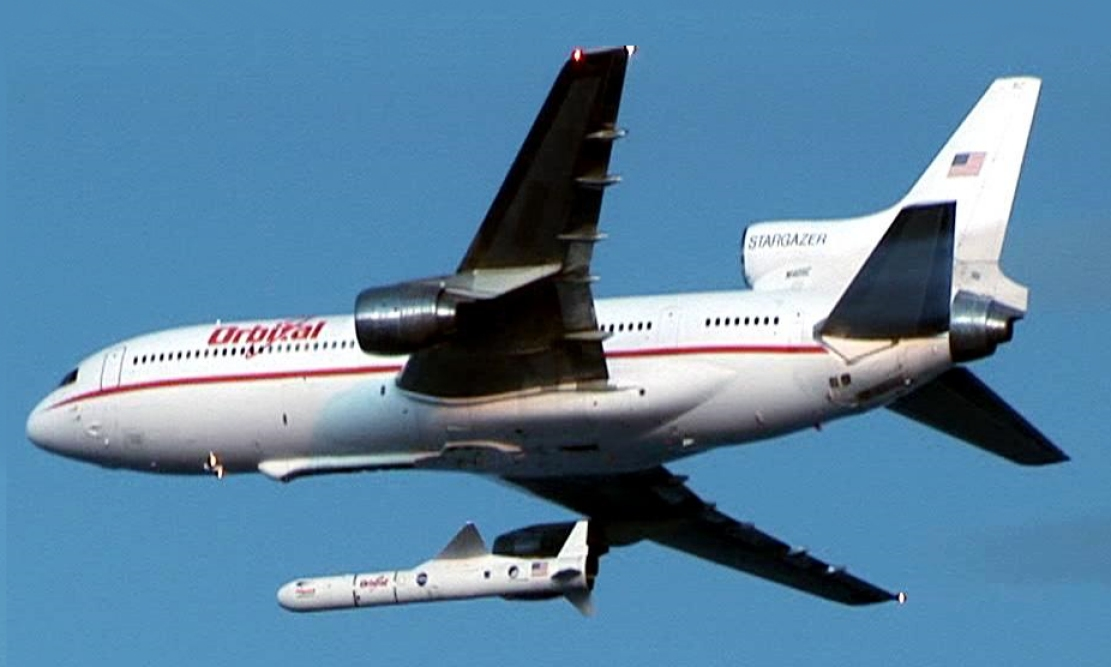
Stargazer launching Pegasus with the Space Technology 5 mission (March 2006)

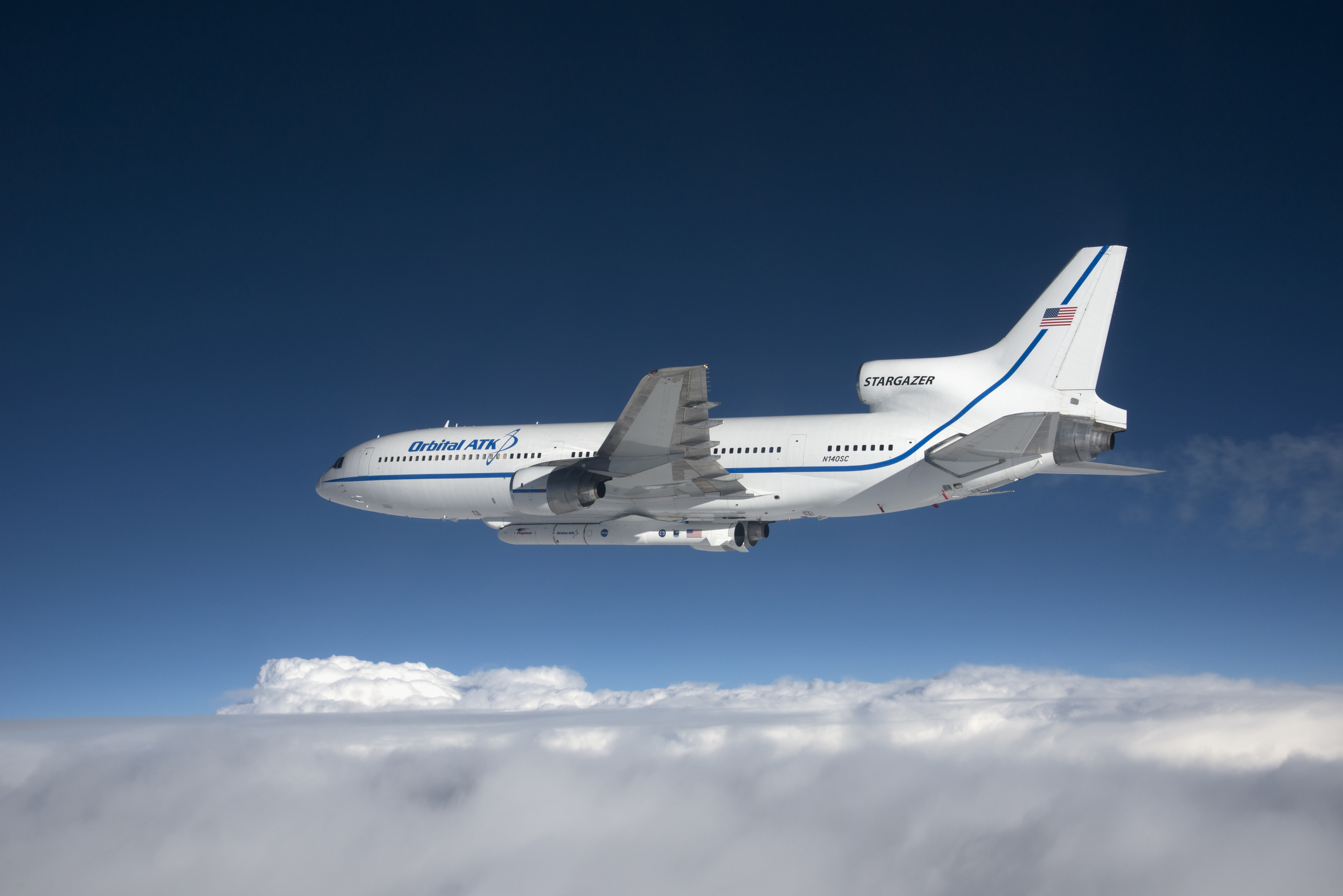
Stargazer in Orbital ATK livery carrying a Pegasus XL rocket (December 2016)

== See also ==
- Scaled Composites White Knight
- LauncherOne — Virgin Galactic rocket
- Cosmic Girl — LauncherOne carrier aircraft
- Scaled Composites Stratolaunch
