= HERMES-A/MINOTAUR =

HERMES-A/MINOTAUR is an Internet-to-Orbit gateway (I2O) which is a device capable of routing information between information processing systems in earth orbit and information processing systems (like computers) connected to the public planetary network (internet) via radio waves or even laser signals. It became online since June 6, 2009, and was presented in the UN-OOSA Symposium of Small Satellites for Sustainable Development in Graz, Austria on September 8, 2009. It was built and operated by the Ecuadorian Civilian Space Agency on Ecuadorian territory, has a reported reception range of 6.000 km centered around the coordinates Lat: 2° 09' 28" S Long: 79° 53' 08" W

== OSI model compliance ==
HERMES has no Terminal Node Controller (TNC), its main job is to convert protocols from one network in the ground (internet) to another network or device in orbit by routing and translating the radio or laser waves to a protocol that can be understand for user-end TNCs, it also has full remote ground station operation capabilities, but in modes like Delta, no control interface is needed. HERMES will serve transport, session and presentation layers, application layer will remain on the user side.

== Operation ==
The HERMES-A/MINOTAUR gateway can operate in 5 modes, digital and analogical:

- MODE A (Alpha): Reception of data from orbit and relay through Internet, full ground station remote control
- MODE B (Beta) : Uplink/downlink full duplex connection between computers on the Internet and orbiting spacecraft, full ground station remote control
- MODE C (Gamma): Half duplex voice conversation between any computer on the Internet and crewed spacecraft, automated
- MODE D (Delta): Automated APT/HRPT signal relay from weather satellites to any computer on the Internet
- MODE E (Epsilon): Automated live video/audio signal relay from crewed/uncrewed spacecraft to any computer on the Internet.

The MINOTAUR antenna array is the primary sensor, it is a 36 feet tall dual polarity, variable frequency resonator operating from 1.2 MHz to 5.8 GHz, is reported to have a 320 dB gain, while the GORGON-B is the secondary array operating in VHF narrow band.

The MINOTAUR array has 2 ip cameras, one on-board and one outside, pointing to the array at http://minotaur.exa.ec/

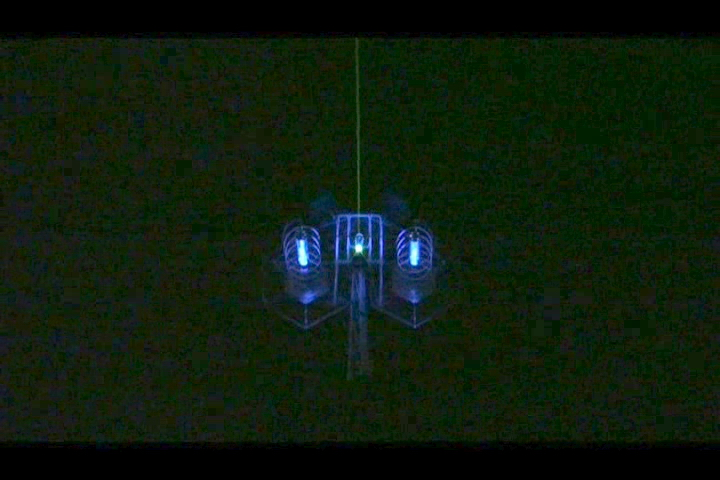

== Use ==
On February 5, 2010, the near miss between an Iridium 33 debris and the pico satellite Swisscube made evident the need of this kind of devices when the HERMES-A/MINOTAUR gateway was used by the Ecuadorian Air Force and the EPFL team controlling Swisscube to track the satellite signal over the internet in real time to monitor if the collision was to happen, due the coordinates of the would-be collision point was under HERMES-A range of operation.

A novel use of this device is the A SATELLITE IN CLASSROOM program which makes use of the Delta operation mode for giving access to meteorological satellites to elementary schools via internet so students can work the satellite images in real time.

The ground station main function is to serve as the controlling space flight center for the first Ecuadorian satellite the NEE-01 Pegasus
