= Nacer Chahat =

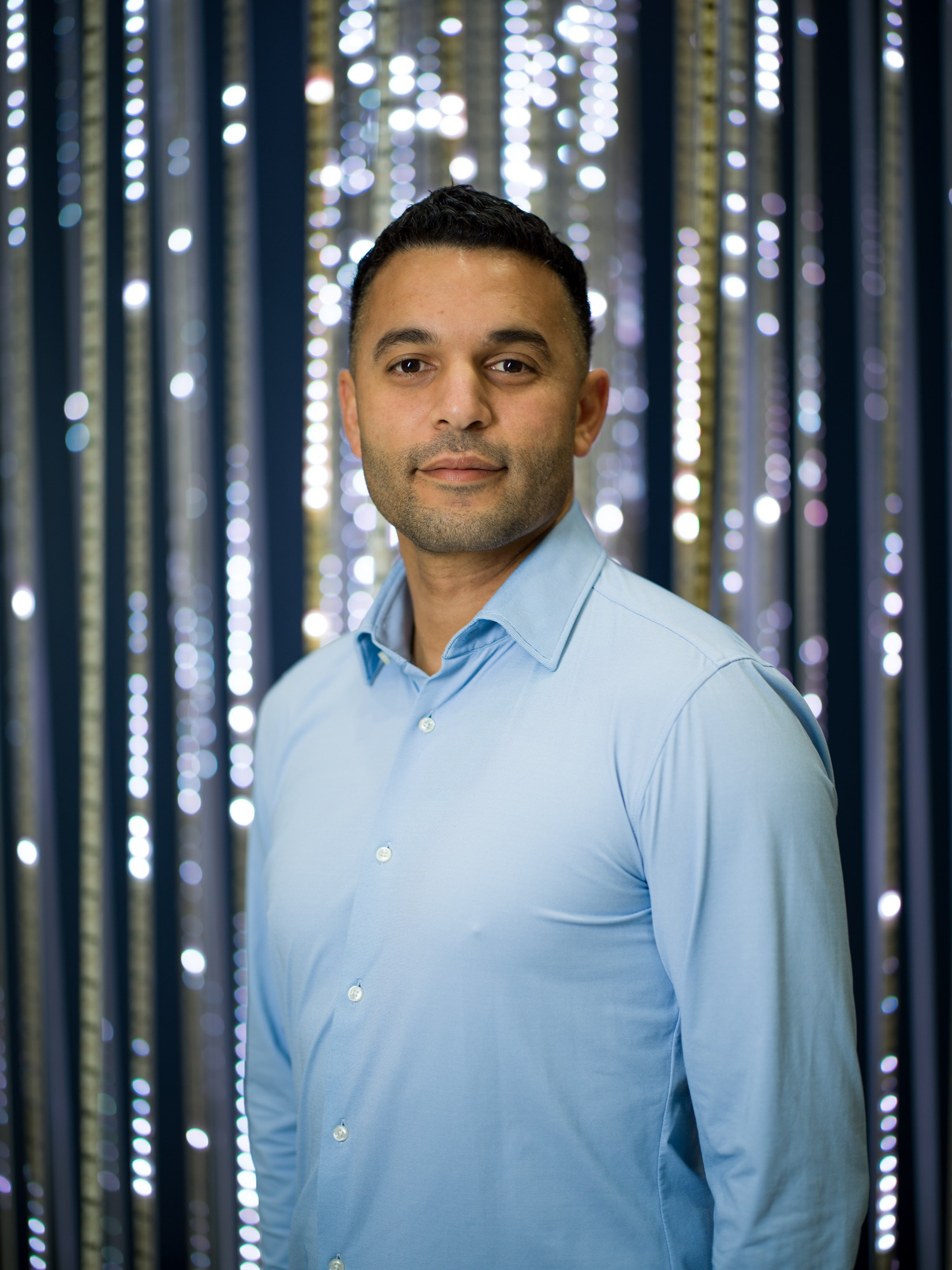
- Born: Nacer E. Chahat; Angers, France
- Education: École supérieure d'ingénieurs de Rennes (MSc); University of Rennes 1 (MSc); University of Rennes 1 (PhD)
- Occupations: Engineer; Researcher
- Organization: National Aeronautics and Space Administration
- Known for: RaInCube; Mars Cube One; Mars Helicopter; Mars 2020; SWOT
- Scientific career
- Institutions: NASA Jet Propulsion Laboratory
- Thesis: Antenna, propagation and interaction with the human body for body-centric wireless communications at microwaves and millimeter waves (2012)

Nacer E. Chahat is a French-American engineer and researcher at the National Aeronautics and Space Administration (NASA) Jet Propulsion Laboratory.

== Early life and education ==
Chahat was born in Angers, France to a family of Algerian descent. He was educated at Palissy High School. He obtained his master's degrees in electrical engineering from École supérieure d'ingénieurs de Rennes|Ecole Supérieure d'Ingénieurs de Rennes (ESIR) and in telecommunication from the Institute of Electronics and Telecommunications of Rennes (IETR), University of Rennes 1 in 2009. He completed his Ph.D. in signal processing and telecommunications at the IETR, University of Rennes 1, in 2012.

== Career ==
Chahat has been associated with the National Aeronautics and Space Administration (NASA) Jet Propulsion Laboratory (JPL), since 2013. Initially, he joined as a Microwave/Antenna Engineer and later took on the roles of Technical Section Staff and Product Delivery Manager in 2017. He became SWOT Payload System engineer in 2019.

At NASA's Jet Propulsion Laboratory (JPL), Chahat has contributed to several projects, including the Mars Helicopter, Mars 2020, SWOT, Europa Clipper, Mars Cube One, RaInCube, and others.

On April 19, 2021, Chahat was part of the Jet Propulsion Laboratory team that successfully made Ingenuity, the first powered-controlled aircraft to fly on another planet.

In 2022, Chahat was named an IEEE Fellow, recognized for his contributions to spacecraft antennas and propagation, and became one of the youngest fellows of IEEE.

== Research ==
Chahat specializes in antenna design and electromagnetic interference and compatibility (EMI/EMC) analysis for space missions. He also works across a wide range of frequencies, from UHF to THz, applied in communications, RADAR, imaging systems, satellite communications antennas, wearable and flexible antennas, and antennas for remote sensing and radio astronomy.

Chahat's notable contributions to NASA missions include the design of the Raincube Ka-band deployable mesh reflector, the Mars Cube One X-band antennas, the Europa lander antenna, and communication tools for the Mars Helicopter mission.

== Awards and recognition ==
- 2015: Prix Bretagne Jeune Chercheur
- 2017: The IEEE Sergei A. Schelkunoff Award
- 2017: The Lew Allen Award for Excellence
- 2018: George Herzl Award
- 2018: The Engineers' Council Future Technology Leader Award
- 2019: JARS Best Paper Award for Photo-Optical Instrumentation and Design
- 2021: IET Dr. Sudhalar Rao Award
- 2022: IEEE Fellow
- 2022: National Space Society (NSS) Award
- 2022: IEEE Spectrum Emerging Technology Award
- 2022: Robert J. Collier Trophy
- 2022: National Air & Space Museum Collins Award
- 2022: Rennais of the Year
- 2023: AIAA Associate Fellow
- 2024: IET Fellow
- 2024: NASA's Exceptional Public Achievement Medal
- 2025: Presidential Early Career Award for Scientists and Engineers

== Selected publications ==
- Zhadobov, Maxim; Chahat, Nacer; Sauleau, Ronan; Quement, Catherine Le; Drean, Yves Le (April 11, 2011). "Millimeter-wave interactions with the human body: state of knowledge and recent advances". International Journal of Microwave and Wireless Technologies. 3 (2): 237–247. doi:10.1017/S1759078711000122 – via Cambridge University Press.
- Chahat, Nacer; Zhadobov, Maxim; Sauleau, Ronan; Ito, Koichi (April 11, 2011). "A Compact UWB Antenna for On-Body Applications". IEEE Transactions on Antennas and Propagation. 59 (4): 1123–1131. Bibcode:2011ITAP...59.1123C. doi:10.1109/TAP.2011.2109361.
- Hodges, Richard E.; Chahat, Nacer; Hoppe, Daniel J.; Vacchione, Joseph D. (April 11, 2017). "A Deployable High-Gain Antenna Bound for Mars: Developing a new folded-panel reflectarray for the first CubeSat mission to Mars". IEEE Antennas and Propagation Magazine. 59 (2): 39–49. Bibcode:2017IAPM...59...39H. doi:10.1109/MAP.2017.2655561.
- Chahat, Nacer; Hodges, Richard E.; Sauder, Jonathan; Thomson, Mark; Peral, Eva; Rahmat-Samii, Yahya (June 11, 2016). "CubeSat Deployable Ka-Band Mesh Reflector Antenna Development for Earth Science Missions". IEEE Transactions on Antennas and Propagation. 64 (6): 2083–2093. Bibcode:2016ITAP...64.2083C. doi:10.1109/TAP.2016.2546306.
- Pellegrini, A.; Brizzi, A.; Zhang, L.; Ali, K.; Hao, Y.; Wu, X.; Constantinou, C. C.; Nechayev, Y.; Hall, P. S.; Chahat, N.; Zhadobov, M.; Sauleau, R. (August 11, 2013). "Antennas and Propagation for Body-Centric Wireless Communications at Millimeter-Wave Frequencies: A Review [Wireless Corner]". IEEE Antennas and Propagation Magazine. 55 (4): 262–287. doi:10.1109/MAP.2013.6645205.
- Chahat, Nacer; Zhadobov, Maxim; Le Coq, Laurent; Sauleau, Ronan (February 11, 2012). "Wearable Endfire Textile Antenna for On-Body Communications at 60 GHz". IEEE Antennas and Wireless Propagation Letters. 11: 799–802. Bibcode:2012IAWPL..11..799C. doi:10.1109/LAWP.2012.2207698.
- Chahat, Nacer; Zhadobov, Maxim; Le Coq, Laurent; Alekseev, Stanislav I.; Sauleau, Ronan (December 11, 2012). "Characterization of the Interactions Between a 60-GHz Antenna and the Human Body in an Off-Body Scenario". IEEE Transactions on Antennas and Propagation. 60 (12): 5958–5965. Bibcode:2012ITAP...60.5958C. doi:10.1109/TAP.2012.2211326.
- Chahat, Nacer; Zhadobov, Maxim; Muhammad, Shoaib Anwar; Le Coq, Laurent; Sauleau, Ronan (April 11, 2013). "60-GHz Textile Antenna Array for Body-Centric Communications". IEEE Transactions on Antennas and Propagation. 61 (4): 1816–1824. Bibcode:2013ITAP...61.1816C. doi:10.1109/TAP.2012.2232633.
- Chahat, Nacer; Valerio, Guido; Zhadobov, Maxim; Sauleau, Ronan (April 11, 2013). "On-Body Propagation at 60 GHz". IEEE Transactions on Antennas and Propagation. 61 (4): 1876–1888. Bibcode:2013ITAP...61.1876C. doi:10.1109/TAP.2013.2242034.

== Bibliography ==
=== Books ===
- CubeSat Antenna Design (2021)

=== Book chapters ===
- G. Chattopadhyay, M. Alonso Del Pino, N. Chahat, D. Gonzalez, and T. Reck, Terahertz antennas and feeds, Chapter 11 in “Aperture antennas for mm and sub-mm wave applications”, Springer, 2017.
- M. Zhadobov, C. Leduc, A. Guraliuc, N. Chahat, and R. Sauleau, “Body-centric wireless communication and networks,” Chapter 5 in Advances in Body-Centric Wireless Communication: Applications and State-of-the-art, ISBN 978-1-84919-989-6, The Institution of Engineering and Technology (IET), 2016.
- N. Chahat, A. Tang, G. Valerio, M. Zhadobov, Anda Guraliuc, and R. Sauleau, Antennas, Phantoms, and Body-centric propagation at millimeter waves, in Electromagnetics of Body-Area Networks: Antennas, Propagation, and RF Circuits, ISBN 978-1-119-02946-5, Wiley/IEEE Press, 2016.
- N. Chahat, M. Zhadobov, and R. Sauleau, Progress in compact antennas, Chapter 6: Antennas for body-centric wireless communications at millimeter wave frequencies, ISBN 978-953-51-1723-0, Intech 2014.
