= INSA (disambiguation) =

INSA may refer to:

- INSA (Germany), a German poll institute
- Indian National Science Academy, a national science academy based in Delhi
- Information Network Security Agency, the Ethiopian intelligence agency that is run by the Ministry of Peace
- Institut national des sciences appliquées, National Institute of Applied Sciences in France
- Instituto Nacional de Saúde Dr. Ricardo Jorge, the National Health Institute of Portugal
- Intelligence and National Security Alliance, an alliance of intelligence business interests
- Israeli Nano Satellite Association
- INSA, a mixtape made in 2014 by MellowHype
