= Interplanetary Nano-Spacecraft Pathfinder in Relevant Environment =

Planned NASA mission

The Interplanetary Nano-Spacecraft Pathfinder in Relevant Environment (INSPIRE) is a future NASA mission involving sending CubeSats out of Earth's orbit into deep space.

The INSPIRE project will demonstrate the capability of deep space CubeSats by placing a nanospacecraft in Earth-escape orbit. Prior to any inclusion on larger planetary missions, CubeSats must demonstrate that they can operate, communicate, and be navigated far from Earth - these are the primary objectives of INSPIRE. Spacecraft components, such as the Iris X-band radio, and the robust watchdog system will provide the basis for future high-capability, lower-cost-risk missions beyond Earth. These components will enable Explorer, Discovery, and New Frontiers supplemental science and educational opportunities at destinations like Earth's Moon, asteroids, comets, Venus, Phobos, or even Europa.

INSPIRE is funded by NASA's Planetary Science Division as a collaboration between the Jet Propulsion Laboratory, California Polytechnic State University, Goldstone-Apple Valley Radio Telescope, Massachusetts Institute of Technology, University of California, Los Angeles, University of Michigan, and University of Texas at Austin.

The launch date and launch location of INSPIRE is to be determined.
