= NEE-02 Krysaor =

Ecuadorian technology demonstration satellite

- Mission type: Technology demonstration
- Operator: Ecuadorian Civilian Space Agency
- COSPAR ID: 2013-066AB
- SATCAT no.: 39441
- Website: www.exa.ec/krysaor/
- Mission duration: Design: 1 year Elapsed: 11 years, 4 months, 6 days
- Orbits completed: 15,074

Spacecraft properties
- Spacecraft type: 1U CubeSat
- Manufacturer: Ecuadorian Civilian Space Agency
- Launch mass: 1.2 kg (2.6 lb)
- Dimensions: 10×10 cm (3.9×3.9 in)
- Power: 127 watts maximum

Start of mission
- Launch date: 21 November 2013, 07:10 UTC
- Rocket: Dnepr
- Launch site: Dombarovsky 370/13
- Entered service: 25 January 2014

Orbital parameters
- Reference system: Geocentric
- Regime: Sun-synchronous
- Semi-major axis: 7,024.99 km (4,365.13 mi)
- Eccentricity: 0.0083597
- Perigee altitude: 588.13 km (365.45 mi)
- Apogee altitude: 705.58 km (438.43 mi)
- Inclination: 97.6637 degrees
- Period: 97.66 minutes
- Mean motion: 14.74
- Epoch: 10 September 2016, 08:01:29 UTC

NEE-02 Krysaor is an Ecuadorian technology demonstration satellite, and Ecuador's second satellite launched to space. Built by the Ecuadorian Civilian Space Agency (EXA), it is a single-unit CubeSat nanosatellite. Krysaor is a Pegasus-class spacecraft, a "twin" of Ecuador's first satellite, NEE-01 Pegaso. Like Pegaso, this spacecraft's instruments include a dual visible and infrared camera which allows the spacecraft to take pictures and transmit live video from space.

== See also ==
- List of CubeSats
