= CubeSat =

Miniature satellite in 10 cm cube modules

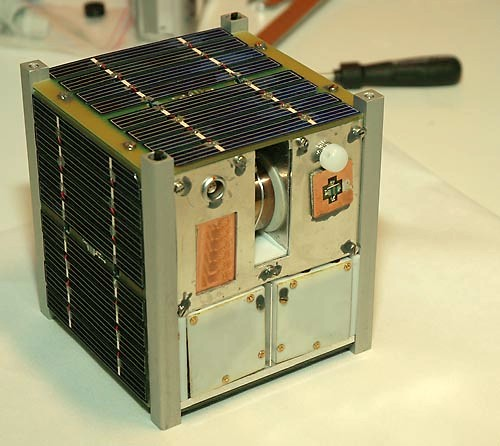
Ncube-2, a Norwegian CubeSat (10 cm (3.9 in) cube)

A CubeSat is a class of small satellite with a form factor of 10 cm (3.9 in) cubes. CubeSats have a mass of no more than 2 kg (4.4 lb) per unit, and often use commercial off-the-shelf (COTS) components for their electronics and structure. CubeSats are deployed into orbit from the International Space Station, or launched as secondary payloads on a launch vehicle. As of January 2026, the Nanosatellite & CubeSat Database records 2,973 CubeSats launched, out of more than 3,200 nanosatellites launched since 1998. Jonathan McDowell's Jonathan's Space Report independently catalogues more than 3,200 CubeSats launched in total.

In 1999, Jordi Puig-Suari, a professor at California Polytechnic State University, San Luis Obispo (Cal Poly) and Bob Twiggs, a professor at Stanford University Space Systems Development Laboratory, developed the CubeSat specifications to promote and develop the skills necessary for the design, manufacture, and testing of small satellites intended for low Earth orbit (LEO) that perform scientific research and explore new space technologies. Academia accounted for the majority of CubeSat launches until 2013, when more than half of launches were for non-academic purposes, and by 2014 most newly deployed CubeSats were for commercial or amateur projects.

Yearly launched CubeSats as of December 2024

Functions typically involve experiments that can be miniaturized or serve purposes such as Earth observation or amateur radio. CubeSats are employed to demonstrate spacecraft technologies intended for small satellites or that present questionable feasibility and are unlikely to justify the cost of a larger satellite. Scientific experiments with unproven underlying theory may also find themselves aboard CubeSats, because their low cost can justify higher risks. Biological research payloads have been flown on several missions, with more planned. Several missions to the Moon and beyond are planning to use CubeSats. The first CubeSats in deep space were flown in the MarCO mission, where two CubeSats were launched towards Mars in May 2018 alongside the successful InSight mission.

Some CubeSats have become countries' first-ever satellites, launched either by universities, state-owned, or private companies. The searchable Nanosatellite and CubeSat Database lists over 4,000 CubeSats that have been or are planned to be launched since 1998.

== History ==
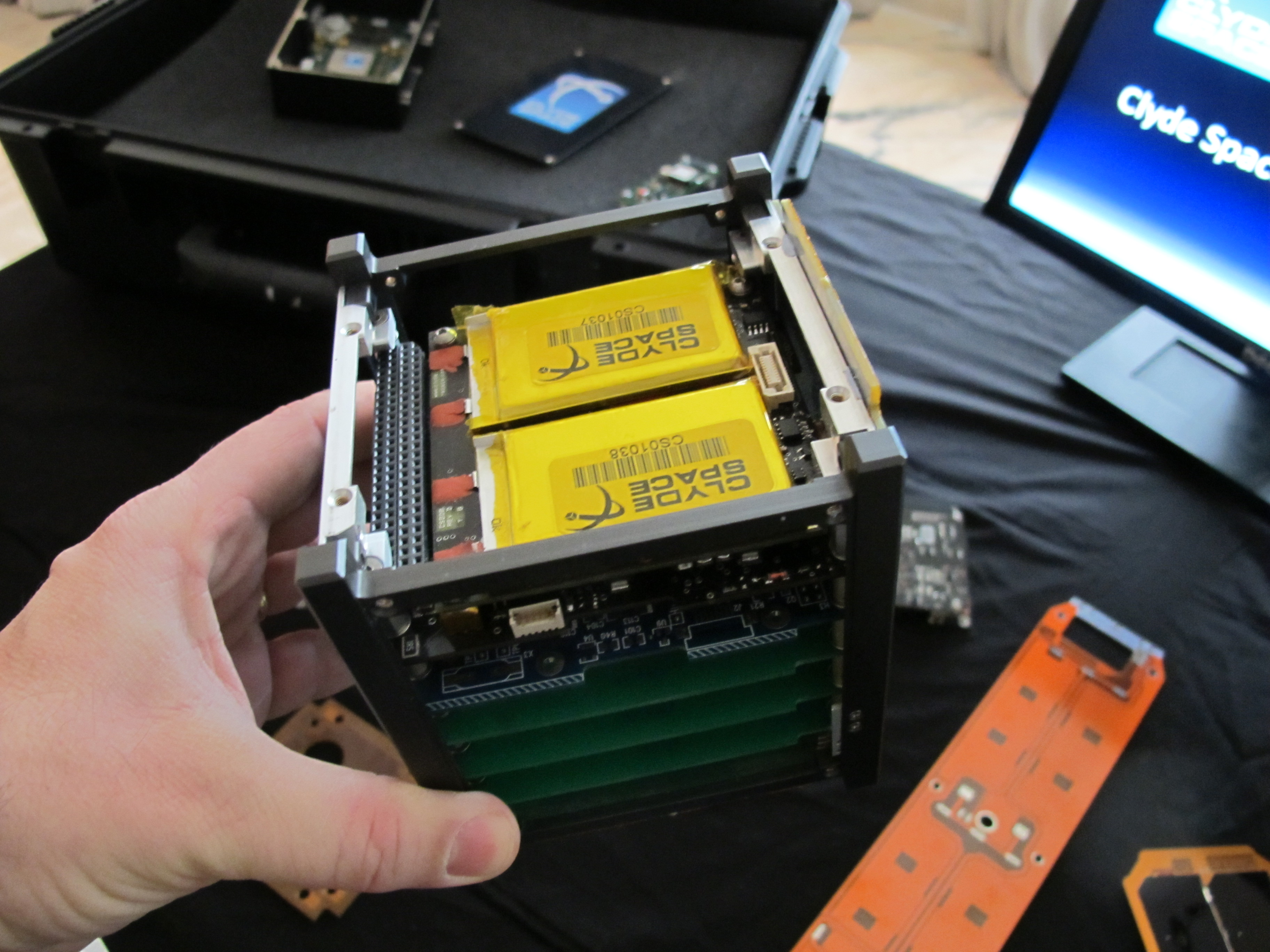
1U CubeSat structure

Professors Jordi Puig-Suari of California Polytechnic State University and Bob Twiggs of Stanford University proposed the CubeSat reference design in 1999 with the aim of enabling graduate students to design, build, test and operate in space a spacecraft with capabilities similar to that of the first spacecraft, Sputnik. The CubeSat, as initially proposed, did not set out to become a standard; rather, it became a standard over time by a process of emergence. The first CubeSats launched in June 2003 on a Russian Eurockot, and approximately 75 CubeSats had entered orbit by 2012. Among that first group was CUTE-I, a 1 kg, 10 cm satellite developed by the Tokyo Institute of Technology Laboratory for Space Systems.

The need for such a small-factor satellite became apparent in 1998 as a result of work done at Stanford University's Space System Development Laboratory. At SSDL, students had been working on the OPAL (Orbiting Picosatellite Automatic Launcher) microsatellite since 1995. OPAL's mission to deploy daughter-ship "picosatellites" had resulted in the development of a launcher system that was "hopelessly complicated" and could only be made to work "most of the time". With the project's delays mounting, Twiggs sought DARPA funding that resulted in the redesign of the launching mechanism into a simple pusher-plate concept with the satellites held in place by a spring-loaded door.

Desiring to shorten the development cycle experienced on OPAL and inspired by the picosatellites OPAL carried, Twiggs set out to find "how much could you reduce the size and still have a practical satellite". The picosatellites on OPAL were 10.1 cm × 7.6 cm × 2.5 cm (4 in × 3 in × 1 in), a size that was not conducive to covering all sides of the spacecraft with solar cells. Inspired by a 4 in (10 cm) cubic plastic box used to display Beanie Babies in stores, Twiggs first settled on the larger ten-centimeter cube as a guideline for the new CubeSat concept. A model of a launcher was developed for the new satellite using the same pusher-plate concept that had been used in the modified OPAL launcher. Twiggs presented the idea to Puig-Suari in the summer of 1999 and then at the Japan–U.S. Science, Technology and Space Applications Program (JUSTSAP) conference in November 1999.

The term "CubeSat" was coined to denote nanosatellites that adhere to the standards described in the CubeSat design specification. Cal Poly published the standard in an effort led by aerospace engineering professor Jordi Puig-Suari. Bob Twiggs, of the Department of Aeronautics & Astronautics at Stanford University, and currently a member of the space science faculty at Morehead State University in Kentucky, has contributed to the CubeSat community. His efforts have focused on CubeSats from educational institutions. The specification does not apply to other cube-like nanosatellites such as the NASA "MEPSI" nanosatellite, which is slightly larger than a CubeSat. GeneSat-1 was NASA's first fully automated, self-contained biological spaceflight experiment on a satellite of its size. It was also the first U.S.-launched CubeSat. This work, led by John Hines at NASA Ames Research, became the catalyst for the entire NASA CubeSat program.

In 2017, this standardization effort led to the publication of ISO 17770:2017 by the International Organization for Standardization. This standard defines specifications for CubeSats including their physical, mechanical, electrical, and operational requirements. It also provides a specification for the interface between the CubeSat and its launch vehicle, which lists the capabilities required to survive the environmental conditions during and after launch and describes the standard deployment interface used to release the satellites. The development of standards shared by a large number of spacecraft contributes to a significant reduction in the development time and cost of CubeSat missions.

== Design ==
The CubeSat specification accomplishes several high-level goals. The main reason for miniaturizing satellites is to reduce the cost of deployment: they are often suitable for launch in multiples, using the excess capacity of larger launch vehicles. The CubeSat design specifically minimizes risk to the rest of the launch vehicle and payloads. Encapsulation of the launcher–payload interface takes away the amount of work that would previously be required for mating a piggyback satellite with its launcher. Unification among payloads and launchers enables quick exchanges of payloads and utilization of launch opportunities on short notice.

Standard CubeSats are made up of 10 cm × 10 cm × 11.35 cm (3.94 in × 3.94 in × 4.47 in) units designed to provide 10 cm × 10 cm × 10 cm (3.9 in × 3.9 in × 3.9 in) or 1 L (0.22 imp gal; 0.26 US gal) of useful volume, with each unit weighing no more than 2 kg (4.4 lb). The smallest standard size is 1U, consisting of a single unit, while the most common form factor was the 3U, which comprised over 40% of all nanosatellites launched to date. Larger form factors, such as the 6U and 12U, are composed of 3Us stacked side by side. In 2014, two 6U Perseus-M CubeSats were launched for maritime surveillance, the largest yet at the time. The Mars Cube One (MarCO) mission in 2018 launched two 6U cubesats towards Mars.

Smaller, non-standard form factors also exist; The Aerospace Corporation has constructed and launched two smaller form CubeSats of 0.5U for radiation measurement and technological demonstration, while Swarm Technologies has built and deployed a constellation of over one hundred 0.25U CubeSats for IoT communication services.

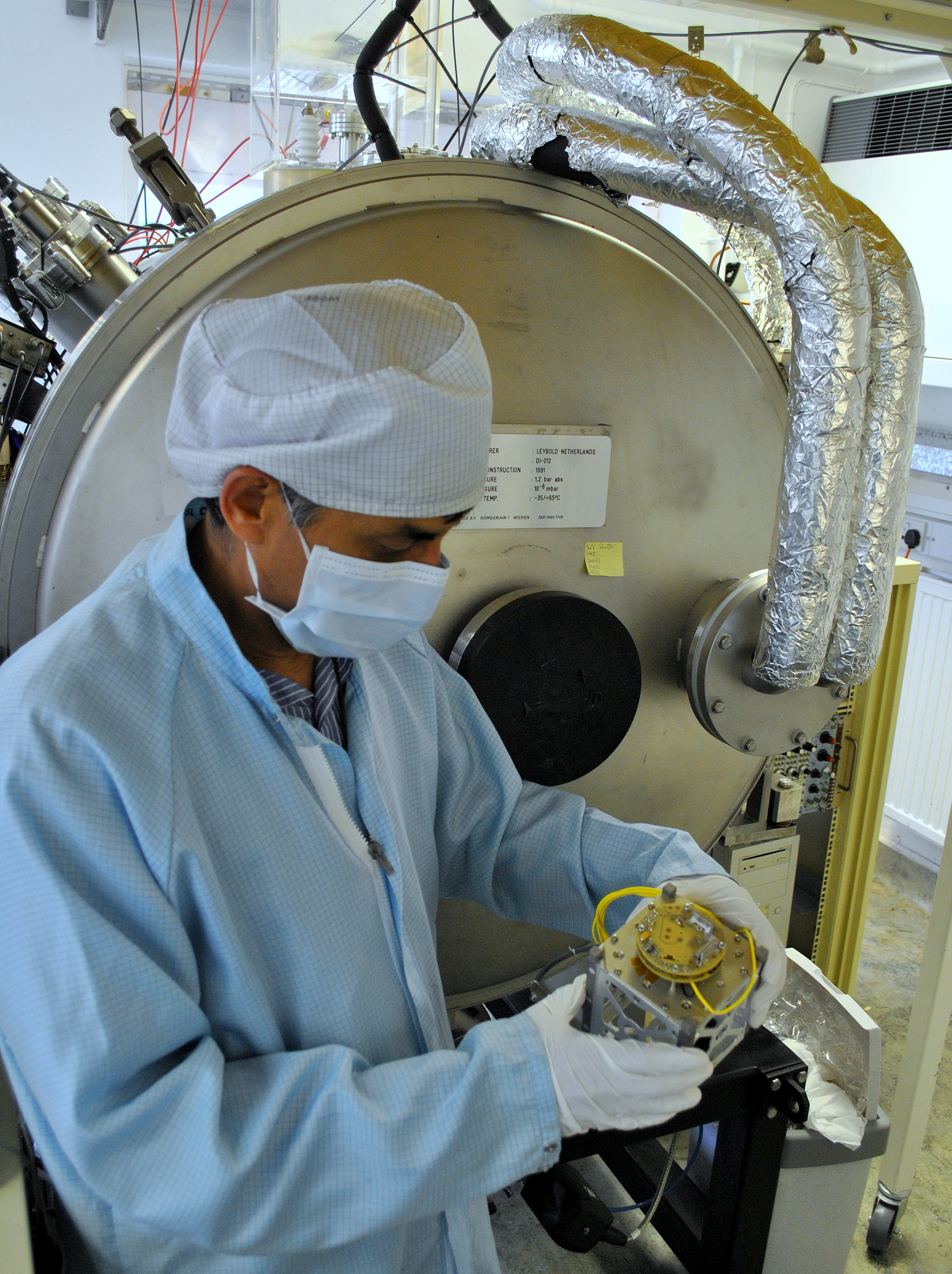
Scientist holding a CubeSat chassis

Since nearly all CubeSats are 10 cm × 10 cm (3.9 in × 3.9 in) (regardless of length) they can all be launched and deployed using a common deployment system called a Poly-PicoSatellite Orbital Deployer (P-POD), developed and built by Cal Poly.

No electronics form factors or communications protocols are specified or required by the CubeSat Design Specification, but COTS hardware has consistently used certain features which many treat as standards in CubeSat electronics. Most COTS and custom designed electronics fit the form of PC/104, which was not designed for CubeSats but presents a 90 mm × 96 mm (3.5 in × 3.8 in) profile that allows most of the spacecraft's volume to be occupied. Technically, the PCI-104 form is the variant of PC/104 used and the actual pinout used does not reflect the pinout specified in the PCI-104 standard. Stackthrough connectors on the boards allow for simple assembly and electrical interfacing and most manufacturers of CubeSat electronics hardware hold to the same signal arrangement, but some products do not, so care must be taken to ensure consistent signal and power arrangements to prevent damage.

Care must be taken in electronics selection to ensure the devices can tolerate the radiation present. For very low Earth orbits (LEO) in which atmospheric reentry would occur in just days or weeks, radiation can largely be ignored and standard consumer grade electronics may be used. Consumer electronic devices can survive LEO radiation for that time as the chance of a single event upset (SEU) is very low. Spacecraft in a sustained low Earth orbit lasting months or years are at risk and only fly hardware designed for and tested in irradiated environments. Missions beyond low Earth orbit or which would remain in low Earth orbit for many years must use radiation-hardened devices. Further considerations are made for operation in high vacuum due to the effects of sublimation, outgassing, and metal whiskers, which may result in mission failure.

=== Structure ===
The number of joined units classifies the size of CubeSats and according to the CubeSat Design Specification are scalable along only one axis to fit the forms of 0.5U, 1U, 1.5U, 2U, or 3U. All the standard sizes of CubeSat have been built and launched, and represent the form factors for nearly all launched CubeSats as of 2015. Materials used in the structure must feature the same coefficient of thermal expansion as the deployer to prevent jamming. Specifically, allowed materials are four aluminum alloys: 7075, 6061, 5005, and 5052. Aluminum used on the structure which contacts the P-POD must be anodized to prevent cold welding, and other materials may be used for the structure if a waiver is obtained. Beyond cold welding, further consideration is put into material selection as not all materials can be used in vacuums. Structures often feature soft dampers at each end, typically made of rubber, to lessen the effects of impacting other CubeSats in the P-POD.

Protrusions beyond the maximum dimensions are allowed by the standard specification, to a maximum of 6.5 mm (0.26 in) beyond each side. Any protrusions may not interfere with the deployment rails and are typically occupied by antennas and solar panels. In Revision 13 of the CubeSat Design Specification an extra available volume was defined for use on 3U projects. The additional volume is made possible by space typically wasted in the P-POD Mk III's spring mechanism. 3U CubeSats which utilize the space are designated 3U+ and may place components in a cylindrical volume centered on one end of the CubeSat. The cylindrical space has a maximum diameter of 6.4 cm (2.5 in) and a height no greater than 3.6 cm (1.4 in) while not allowing for any increase in mass beyond the 3U's maximum of 4 kg (8.8 lb). Propulsion systems and antennas are the most common components that might require the additional volume, though the payload sometimes extends into this volume. Deviations from the dimension and mass requirements can be waived following application and negotiation with the launch service provider.

CubeSat structures do not have all the same strength concerns as larger satellites do, as they have the added benefit of the deployer supporting them structurally during launch. Still, some CubeSats will undergo vibration analysis or structural analysis to ensure that components unsupported by the P-POD remain structurally sound throughout the launch. Despite rarely undergoing the analysis that larger satellites do, CubeSats rarely fail due to mechanical issues.

=== Computing ===
Like larger satellites, CubeSats often feature multiple computers handling different tasks in parallel including the attitude control (orientation), power management, payload operation, and primary control tasks. COTS attitude-control systems typically include their own computer, as do the power management systems. Payloads must be able to interface with the primary computer to be useful, which sometimes requires the use of another small computer. This may be due to limitations in the primary computer's ability to control the payload with limited communication protocols, to prevent overloading the primary computer with raw data handling, or to ensure payload's operation continues uninterrupted by the spacecraft's other computing needs such as communication. Still, the primary computer may be used for payload related tasks, which might include image processing, data analysis, and data compression. Tasks which the primary computer typically handles include the delegation of tasks to the other computers, attitude control, calculations for orbital maneuvers, scheduling, and activation of active thermal control components. CubeSat computers are highly susceptible to radiation and builders will take special steps to ensure proper operation in the high radiation of space, such as the use of ECC RAM. Some satellites may incorporate redundancy by implementing multiple primary computers; this could be done on valuable missions to lessen the risk of mission failure. Consumer smartphones have been used for computing in some CubeSats, such as NASA's PhoneSats.

=== Attitude control ===
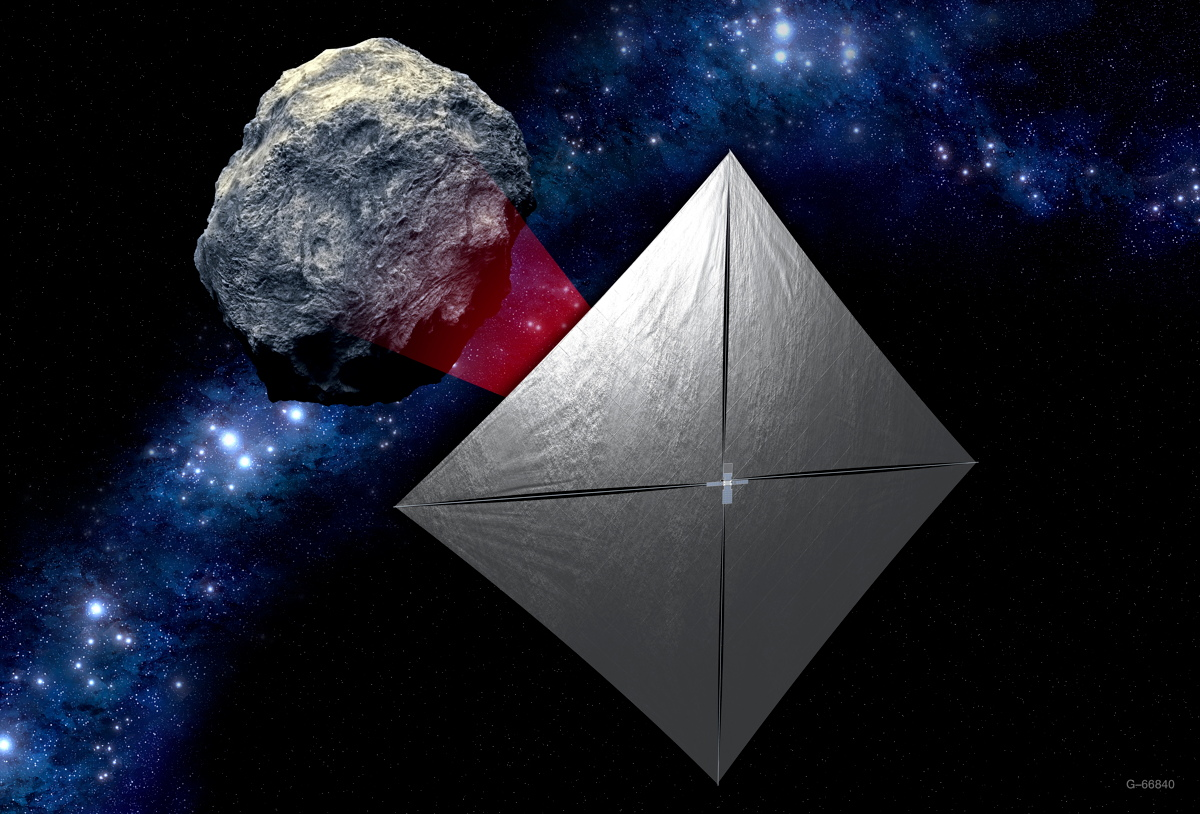
Near-Earth Asteroid Scout concept: a controllable solar sail CubeSat

Attitude control (orientation) for CubeSats relies on miniaturizing technology without significant performance degradation. Tumbling typically occurs as soon as a CubeSat is deployed, due to asymmetric deployment forces and bumping with other CubeSats. Some CubeSats operate normally while tumbling, but those that require pointing in a certain direction or cannot operate safely while spinning, must be detumbled. Systems that perform attitude determination and control include reaction wheels, magnetorquers, thrusters, star trackers, Sun sensors, Earth sensors, angular rate sensors, and GPS receivers and antennas. Combinations of these systems are typically seen in order to take each method's advantages and mitigate their shortcomings. Reaction wheels are commonly utilized for their ability to impart relatively large moments for any given energy input, but reaction wheel's utility is limited due to saturation, the point at which a wheel cannot spin faster. Examples of CubeSat reaction wheels include the Maryland Aerospace MAI-101 and the Sinclair Interplanetary RW-0.03-4. Reaction wheels can be desaturated with the use of thrusters or magnetorquers. Thrusters can provide large moments by imparting a couple on the spacecraft but inefficiencies in small propulsion systems cause thrusters to run out of fuel rapidly. Commonly found on nearly all CubeSats are magnetorquers which run electricity through a coil to take advantage of Earth's magnetic field to produce a turning moment. Attitude-control modules and solar panels typically feature built-in magnetorquers. For CubeSats that only need to detumble, no attitude determination method beyond an angular rate sensor or electronic gyroscope is necessary.

Pointing in a specific direction is necessary for Earth observation, orbital maneuvers, maximizing solar power, and some scientific instruments. Directional pointing accuracy can be achieved by sensing Earth and its horizon, the Sun, or specific stars. Sinclair Interplanetary's SS-411 Sun sensor and ST-16 star tracker both have applications for CubeSats and have flight heritage. Pumpkin's Colony I Bus uses an aerodynamic wing for passive attitude stabilization. Determination of a CubeSat's location can be done through the use of on-board GPS, which is relatively expensive for a CubeSat, or by relaying radar tracking data to the craft from Earth-based tracking systems.

=== Propulsion ===
CubeSat propulsion has made rapid advancements in: cold gas, chemical propulsion, electric propulsion, and solar sails. The biggest challenge with CubeSat propulsion is preventing risk to the launch vehicle and its primary payload while still providing significant capability. Components and methods that are commonly used in larger satellites are disallowed or limited, and the CubeSat Design Specification (CDS) requires a waiver for pressurization above 1.2 atm (120 kPa), over 100 Wh of stored chemical energy, and hazardous materials. Those restrictions pose great challenges for CubeSat propulsion systems, as typical space propulsion systems utilize combinations of high pressures, high energy densities, and hazardous materials. Beyond the restrictions set forth by launch service providers, various technical challenges further reduce the usefulness of CubeSat propulsion. Gimbaled thrust cannot be used in small engines due to the complexity of gimbaling mechanisms, thrust vectoring must instead be achieved by thrusting asymmetrically in multiple-nozzle propulsion systems or by changing the center of mass relative to the CubeSat's geometry with actuated components. Small motors may also not have room for throttling methods that allow smaller than fully on thrust, which is important for precision maneuvers such as rendezvous. CubeSats which require longer life also benefit from propulsion systems; when used for orbit keeping a propulsion system can slow orbital decay.

==== Cold gas thrusters ====
A cold gas thruster typically stores inert gas, such as nitrogen, in a pressurized tank and releases the gas through a nozzle to produce thrust. Operation is handled by just a single valve in most systems, which makes cold gas the simplest useful propulsion technology. Cold gas propulsion systems can be very safe since the gases used do not have to be volatile or corrosive, though some systems opt to feature dangerous gases such as sulfur dioxide. This ability to use inert gases is highly advantageous to CubeSats as they are usually restricted from hazardous materials. Only low performance can be achieved with them, preventing high impulse maneuvers even in low mass CubeSats. Due to this low performance, their use in CubeSats for main propulsion is limited and designers choose higher efficiency systems with only minor increases in complexity. Cold gas systems more often see use in CubeSat attitude control.

==== Chemical propulsion ====
Chemical propulsion systems use a chemical reaction to produce a high-pressure, high-temperature gas that accelerates out of a nozzle. Chemical propellant can be liquid, solid or a hybrid of both. Liquid propellants can be a monopropellant passed through a catalyst, or bipropellant which combusts an oxidizer and a fuel. The benefits of monopropellants are relatively low-complexity/high-thrust output, low power requirements, and high reliability. Monopropellant motors tend to have high thrust while remaining comparatively simple, which also provides high reliability. These motors are practical for CubeSats due to their low power requirements and because their simplicity allows them to be very small. Small hydrazine fueled motors have been developed, but may require a waiver to fly due to restrictions on hazardous chemicals set forth in the CubeSat Design Specification. Safer chemical propellants which would not require hazardous chemical waivers are being developed, such as AF-M315 (hydroxylammonium nitrate) for which motors are being or have been designed. A "Water Electrolysis Thruster" is technically a chemical propulsion system, as it burns hydrogen and oxygen which it generates by on-orbit electrolysis of water.

==== Electric propulsion ====
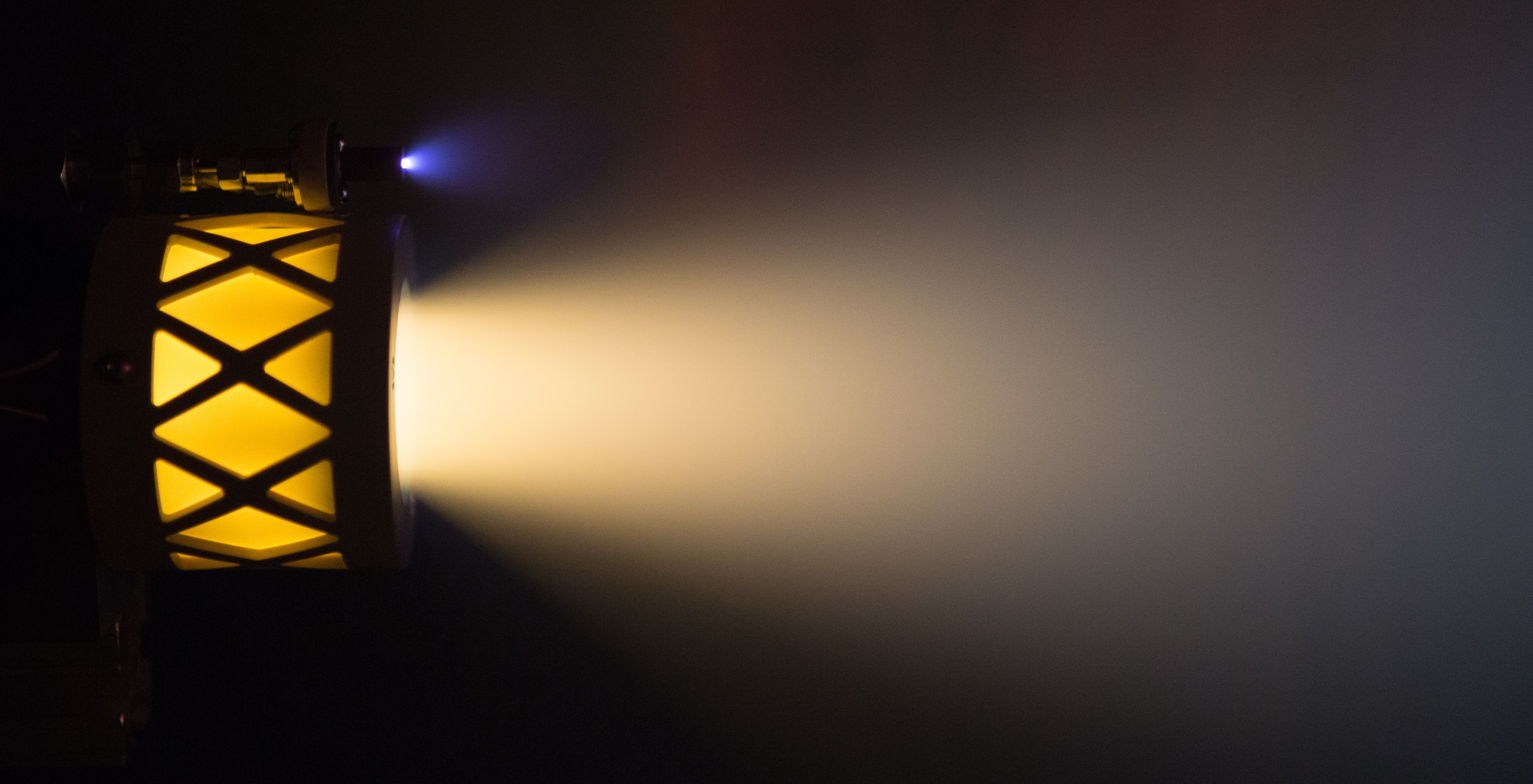
The Busek BIT-3 gridded ion thruster was used to propel the Lunar IceCube 6U CubeSat.

CubeSat electric propulsion typically uses electric energy to accelerate propellant to high speed, which results in high specific impulse. Many of these technologies can be made small enough for use in nanosatellites, and several methods are in development. Types of electric propulsion currently being designed for use in CubeSats include Hall-effect thrusters, ion thrusters, pulsed plasma thrusters, electrospray thrusters, and resistojets. Several notable CubeSat missions plan to use electric propulsion, such as NASA's Lunar IceCube. The high efficiency associated with electric propulsion could allow CubeSats to propel themselves to Mars. Electric propulsion systems are disadvantaged in their use of power, which requires the CubeSat to have larger solar cells, more complicated power distribution, and often larger batteries. Furthermore, many electric propulsion methods may still require pressurized tanks to store propellant, which is restricted by the CubeSat Design Specification.

The ESTCube-1 used an electric solar-wind sail, which relies on an electromagnetic field to act as a sail instead of a solid material. This technology used an electric field to deflect protons from solar wind to produce thrust. It is similar to an electrodynamic tether in that the craft only needs to supply electricity to operate.

==== Solar sail ====
Solar sails (also called light sails or photon sails) are a form of spacecraft propulsion using the radiation pressure (also called solar pressure) from stars to push large ultra-thin mirrors to high speeds, requiring no propellant. Force from a solar sail scales with the sail's area, this makes sails well suited for use in CubeSats as their small mass results in the greater acceleration for a given solar sail's area. However, solar sails still need to be quite large compared to the satellite, which means useful solar sails must be deployed, adding mechanical complexity and a potential source of failure. This propulsion method is the only one not plagued with restrictions set by the CubeSat Design Specification, as it does not require high pressures, hazardous materials, or significant chemical energy. A small number of CubeSats have employed a solar sail as its main propulsion and stability in deep space, including the 3U NanoSail-D2 launched in 2010, and the LightSail-1 in May 2015.

LightSail-2 successfully deployed on a Falcon Heavy rocket in 2019, while one CubeSat that was planned to launch on the Space Launch System's first flight (Artemis 1) in November 2022 was set to use a solar sail: the Near-Earth Asteroid Scout (NEA Scout). The CubeSat was declared lost when communications were not established within 2 days.

=== Power ===
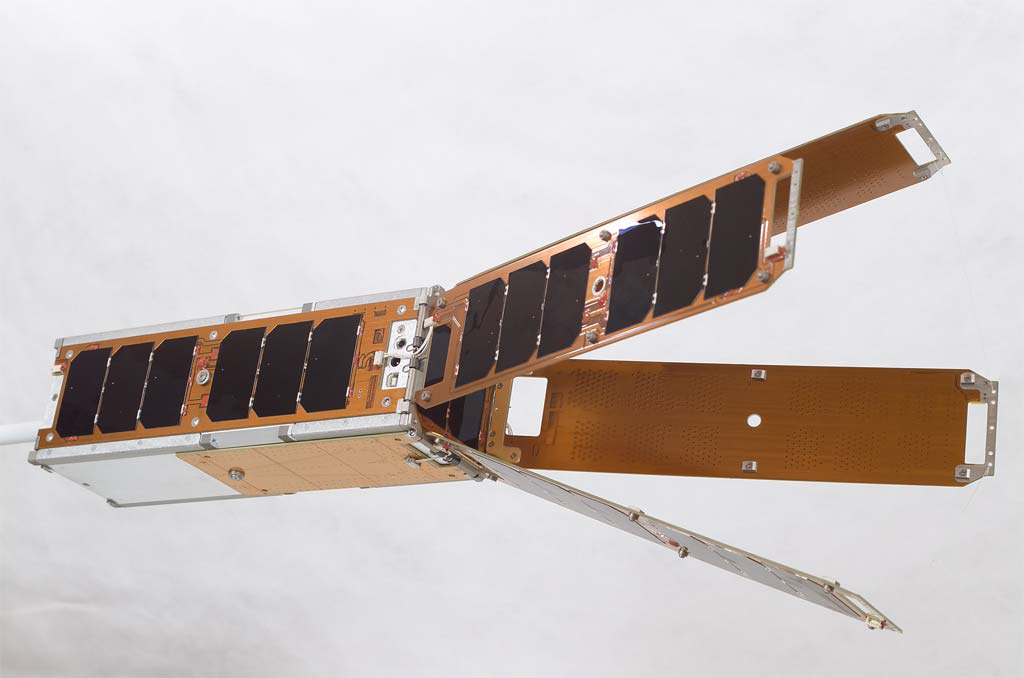
Winglet solar panels increase surface area for power generation.

CubeSats use solar cells to convert solar light to electricity that is then stored in rechargeable lithium-ion batteries that provide power during eclipse as well as during peak load times. These satellites have a limited surface area on their external walls for solar cells assembly, and has to be effectively shared with other parts, such as antennas, optical sensors, camera lens, propulsion systems, and access ports. Lithium-ion batteries feature high energy-to-mass ratios, making them well suited to use on mass-restricted spacecraft. Battery charging and discharging is typically handled by a dedicated electrical power system (EPS). Batteries sometimes feature heaters to prevent the battery from reaching dangerously low temperatures which might cause battery decay and mission failure.

The rate at which the batteries decay depends on the number of cycles for which they are charged and discharged, as well as the depth of each discharge: the greater the average depth of discharge, the faster a battery degrades. For LEO missions, the number of cycles of discharge can be expected to be on the order of several hundred.

Due to size and weight constraints, common CubeSats flying in LEO with body-mounted solar panels have generated less than 10 W. Missions with higher power requirements can make use of attitude control to ensure the solar panels remain in their most effective orientation toward the Sun, and further power needs can be met through the addition and orientation of deployable solar arrays, which can be unfolded to a substantially larger area on-orbit. Recent innovations include additional spring-loaded solar arrays that deploy as soon as the satellite is released, as well as arrays that feature thermal knife mechanisms that would deploy the panels when commanded. CubeSats may not be powered between launch and deployment, and must feature a remove-before-flight pin which cuts all power to prevent operation during loading into the P-POD. Additionally, a deployment switch is actuated while the craft is loaded into a P-POD, cutting power to the spacecraft and is deactivated after exiting the P-POD.

=== Telecommunications ===
Deployable high-gain mesh reflector antenna operating at Ka-band (27–40 GHz) for the radar in a CubeSat (RaInCube)

The low cost of CubeSats has enabled unprecedented access to space for smaller institutions and organizations but, for most CubeSat forms, the range and available power is limited to about 2 W for its communications antennae.

Because of tumbling and low power range, radio-communications are a challenge. Many CubeSats use an omnidirectional monopole or dipole antenna built with commercial measuring tape. For more demanding needs, some companies offer high-gain antennae for CubeSats, but their deployment and pointing systems are significantly more complex. For example, MIT and JPL are developing an inflatable dish antenna based on a mylar skin inflated with a sublimating powder, claiming a 7× boost in range—potentially able to reach the Moon—but questions linger concerning survivability after micrometeor impacts. JPL has successfully developed X-band and Ka-band high-gain antennas for MarCO and Radar in a CubeSat (RaInCube) missions.

==== Antennas ====
Traditionally, Low Earth Orbit Cubesats use antennas for communication purpose at UHF and S-band. To venture farther in the Solar System, larger antennas compatible with the Deep Space Network (X-band and Ka-band) are required. JPL's engineers developed several deployable high-gain antennas compatible with 6U-class CubeSats for MarCO and Near-Earth Asteroid Scout. JPL's engineers have also developed a 0.5 m (1 ft 8 in) mesh reflector antenna operating at Ka-band and compatible with the DSN that folds in a 1.5U stowage volume. For MarCO, JPL's antenna engineers designed a Folded Panel Reflectarray (FPR) to fit on a 6U CubeSat bus and supports X-band Mars-to-Earth telecommunications at 8 kbit/s at 1AU.

=== Thermal management ===
Different CubeSat components possess different acceptable temperature ranges, beyond which they may become temporarily or permanently inoperable. Satellites in orbit are heated by radiative heat emitted from the Sun directly and reflected off Earth, as well as heat generated by the craft's components. CubeSats must also cool by radiating heat either into space or into the cooler Earth's surface, if it is cooler than the spacecraft. All of these radiative heat sources and sinks are rather constant and very predictable, so long as the CubeSat's orbit and eclipse time are known.

Components used to ensure the temperature requirements are met in CubeSats include multi-layer insulation and heaters for the battery. Other spacecraft thermal control techniques in small satellites include specific component placement based on expected thermal output of those components and, rarely, deployed thermal devices such as louvers. Analysis and simulation of the spacecraft's thermal model is an important determining factor in applying thermal management components and techniques. CubeSats with special thermal concerns, often associated with certain deployment mechanisms and payloads, may be tested in a thermal vacuum chamber before launch. Such testing provides a larger degree of assurance than full-sized satellites can receive, since CubeSats are small enough to fit inside of a thermal vacuum chamber in their entirety. Temperature sensors are typically placed on different CubeSat components so that action may be taken to avoid dangerous temperature ranges, such as reorienting the craft in order to avoid or introduce direct thermal radiation to a specific part, thereby allowing it to cool or heat.

=== Costs ===
CubeSat forms a cost-effective independent means of getting a payload into orbit. After delays from low-cost launchers such as Interorbital Systems, launch prices have been about $100,000 per unit, but newer operators are offering lower pricing. A typical price to launch a 1U cubesat with a full service contract (including end-to-end integration, licensing, transportation etc.) was about $60,000 in 2021.

Some CubeSats have complicated components or instruments, such as LightSail-1, that push their construction cost into the millions of dollars, but a basic 1U CubeSat can cost about $50,000 to construct. This makes CubeSats a viable option for some schools, universities, and small businesses.

== Missions ==
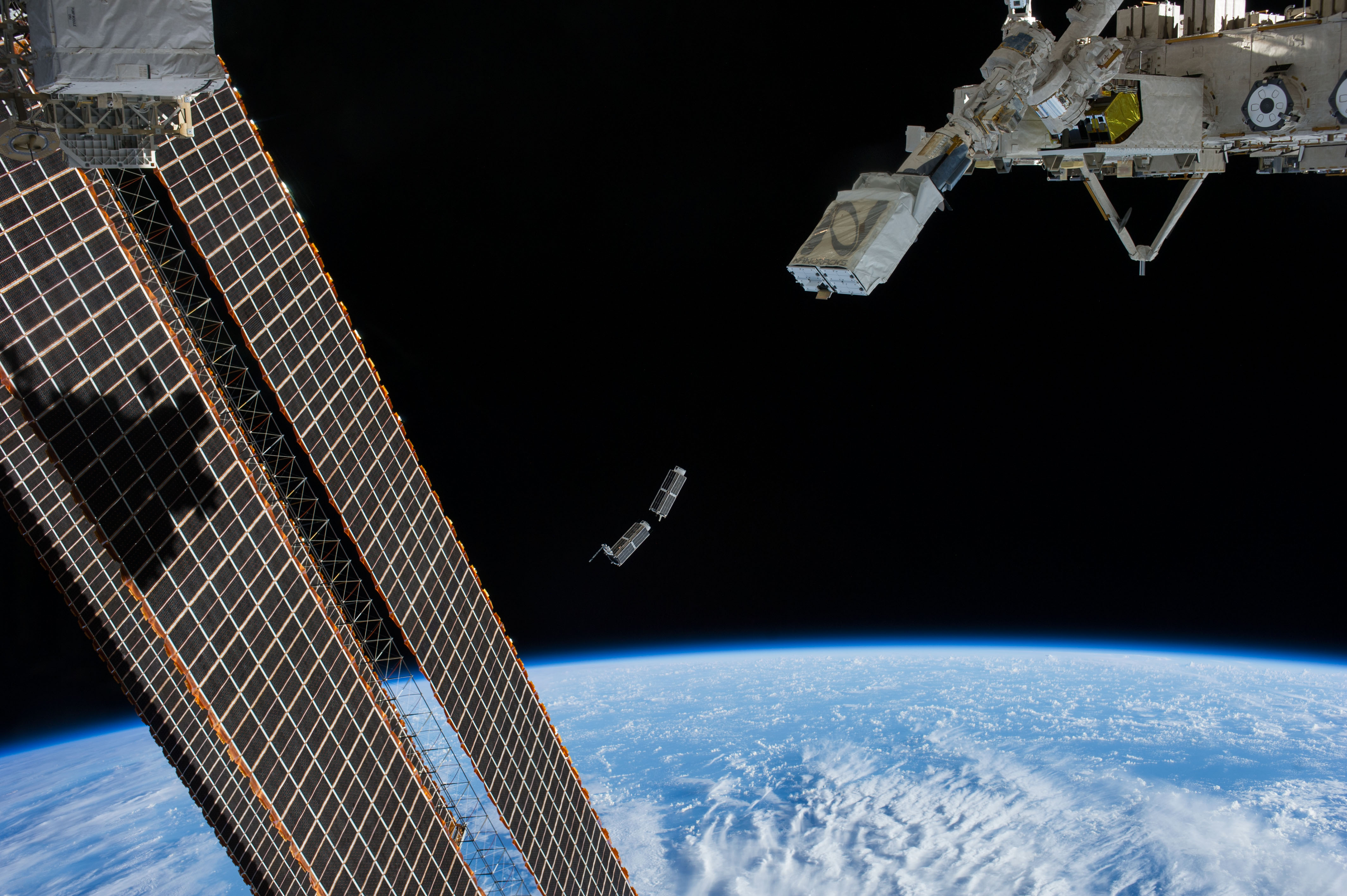
NanoRacks CubeSats being launched from the NanoRacks CubeSat Deployer on the ISS on February 25, 2014

The Nanosatellite & Cubesat Database lists over 2,000 CubeSats that have been launched since 1998. One of the earliest CubeSat launches was on 30 June 2003 from Plesetsk, Russia, with Eurockot Launch Services's Multiple Orbit Mission. The CubeSats were injected into a Sun-synchronous orbit and included the Danish AAU CubeSat and DTUSat, the Japanese XI-IV and CUTE-1, the Canadian Can X-1, and the US Quakesat.

On February 13, 2012, three P-POD deployers containing seven CubeSats were placed into orbit along with the Lares satellite aboard a Vega rocket launched from French Guiana. The CubeSats launched were e-st@r Space (Politecnico di Torino, Italy), Goliat (University of Bucharest, Romania), MaSat-1 (Budapest University of Technology and Economics, Hungary), PW-Sat (Warsaw University of Technology, Poland), Robusta (University of Montpellier 2, France), UniCubeSat-GG (University of Rome La Sapienza, Italy), and XaTcobeo (University of Vigo and INTA, Spain). The CubeSats were launched in the framework of the "Vega Maiden Flight" opportunity of the European Space Agency.

On September 13, 2012, eleven CubeSats were launched from eight P-PODs, as part of the "OutSat" secondary payload aboard a United Launch Alliance Atlas V rocket. This was the largest number of CubeSats (and largest volume of 24U) orbited on a single launch so far, made possible by the new NPS CubeSat Launcher system (NPSCuL) developed at the Naval Postgraduate School (NPS). The CubeSats were: SMDC-ONE 2.2 (Baker), SMDC-ONE 2.1 (Able), AeroCube 4.0(x3), Aeneas, CSSWE, CP5, CXBN, CINEMA, and Re (STARE).

Five CubeSats (Raiko, Niwaka, We-Wish, TechEdSat, F-1) were placed into orbit from the International Space Station on October 4, 2012, as a technology demonstration of small satellite deployment from the ISS. They were launched and delivered to ISS as a cargo of Kounotori 3, and an ISS astronaut prepared the deployment mechanism attached to Japanese Experiment Module's robotic arm.

Four CubeSats were deployed from the Cygnus Mass Simulator, which was launched April 21, 2013 on the maiden flight of Orbital Sciences' Antares rocket. Three of them are 1U PhoneSats built by NASA's Ames Research Center to demonstrate the use of smart phones as avionics in CubeSats. The fourth was a 3U satellite, called Dove-1, built by Planet Labs.

On April 26, 2013 NEE-01 Pegaso was launched and was the first CubeSat able to transmit live video from orbit, also the first 1U CubeSat to achieve more than 100 watts of power as installed capacity. Later in November same year NEE-02 Krysaor also transmitted live video from orbit. Both CubeSats were built by the Ecuadorian Space Agency.

A total of thirty-three CubeSats were deployed from the ISS on February 11, 2014. Of those thirty-three, twenty-eight were part of the Flock-1 constellation of Earth-imaging CubeSats. Of the other five, two are from other US-based companies, two from Lithuania, and one from Peru.

The LightSail-1 is a 3U CubeSat prototype propelled by a solar sail. It was launched on 20 May 2015 from Florida. Its four sails are made of very thin Mylar and have a total area of 32 m^{2} (340 sq ft). This test will allow a full checkout of the satellite's systems in advance of the main 2016 mission.

On October 5, 2015, AAUSAT5 (Aalborg University, Denmark), was deployed from the ISS. launched in the framework of the "Fly Your Satellite!" programme of the European Space Agency.

The Miniature X-ray Solar Spectrometer CubeSat is a 3U launched to the International Space Station on 6 December 2015 from where it was deployed on 16 May 2016. It is the first mission launched in the NASA Science Mission Directorate CubeSat Integration Panel, which is focused on doing science with CubeSats. As of 12 July 2016, the minimum mission success criterion (one month of science observations) has been met, but the spacecraft continues to perform nominally and observations continue.

Three CubeSats were launched on April 25, 2016, together with Sentinel-1B on a Soyuz rocket VS14 launched from Kourou, French Guiana. The satellites were: AAUSAT4 (Aalborg University, Denmark), e-st@r-II (Politecnico di Torino, Italy) and OUFTI-1 (Université de Liège, Belgium). The CubeSats were launched in the framework of the "Fly Your Satellite!" programme of the European Space Agency.

On February 15, 2017, Indian Space Research Organisation (ISRO) set a record with the launch of 104 satellites on a single rocket. The launch of PSLV-C37 in a single payload, including the Cartosat-2 series and 103 co-passenger satellites, together weighed over 650 kg (1,430 lb). Of the 104 satellites, all but three were CubeSats. Of the 101 nano satellites, 96 were from the United States and one each from Israel, Kazakhstan, the Netherlands, Switzerland and the United Arab Emirates.

=== 2018 InSight mission: MarCO CubeSats ===
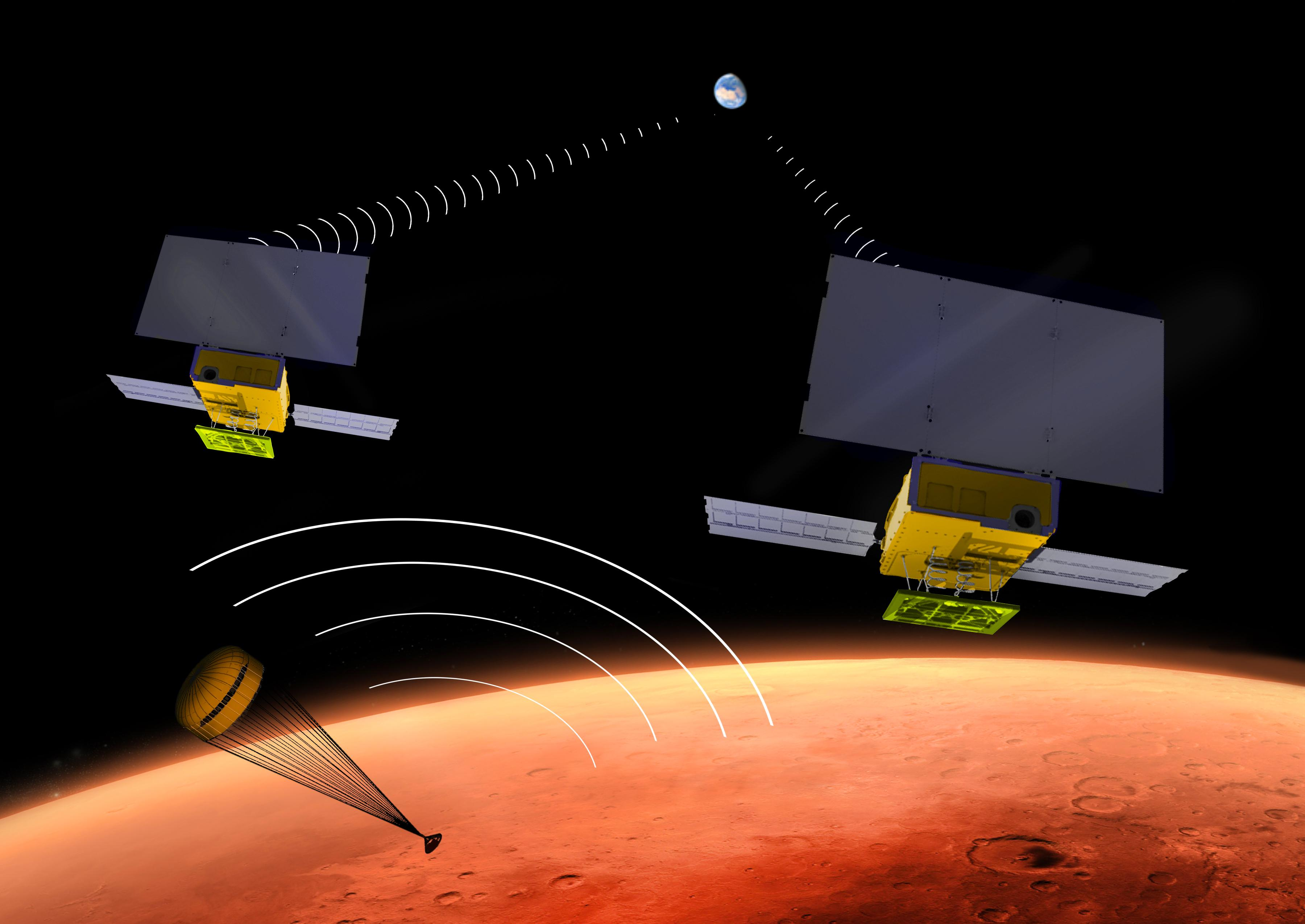
An artist's rendering of MarCO A and B during the descent of InSight

The May 2018 launch of the InSight stationary Mars lander included two CubeSats to fly by Mars to provide additional relay communications from InSight to Earth during entry and landing. This is the first flight of CubeSats outside of the Earth's direct orbit. The mission CubeSat technology is called Mars Cube One (MarCO); each one is a six-unit CubeSat, 14.4 in × 9.5 in × 4.6 in (37 cm × 24 cm × 12 cm). MarCO is an experiment, but not necessary for the InSight mission, to add relay communications to space missions in important time durations, in this case from the time of InSight atmospheric entry to its landing.

MarCO launched in May 2018 with the InSight lander, separated after launch and then traveled in their own trajectories to Mars. After separation, both MarCO spacecraft deployed two radio antennas and two solar panels. The high-gain, X band antenna is a flat panel to direct radio waves. MarCO navigated to Mars independently from the InSight lander, making their own course adjustments on the flight.

During InSight's entry, descent and landing (EDL) in November 2018, the lander transmitted telemetry in the UHF radio band to NASA's Mars Reconnaissance Orbiter (MRO) flying overhead. MRO forwarded EDL information to Earth using a radio frequency in the X band, but cannot simultaneously receive information in one band if transmitting on another. Confirmation of a successful landing could be received on Earth several hours after, so MarCO was a technology demonstration of real-time telemetry during the landing.

Views from MarCO

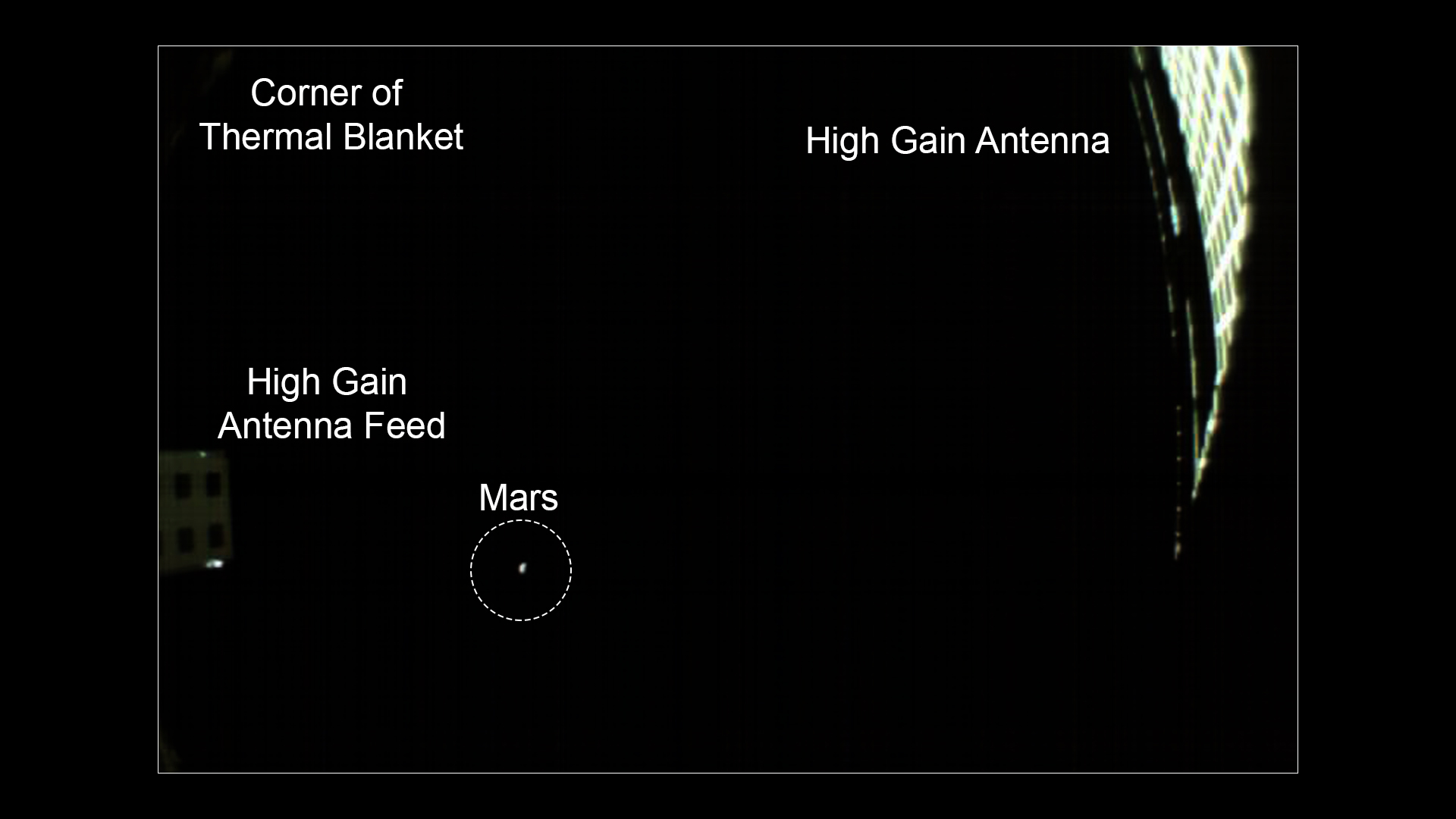
Mars (24 November 2018)

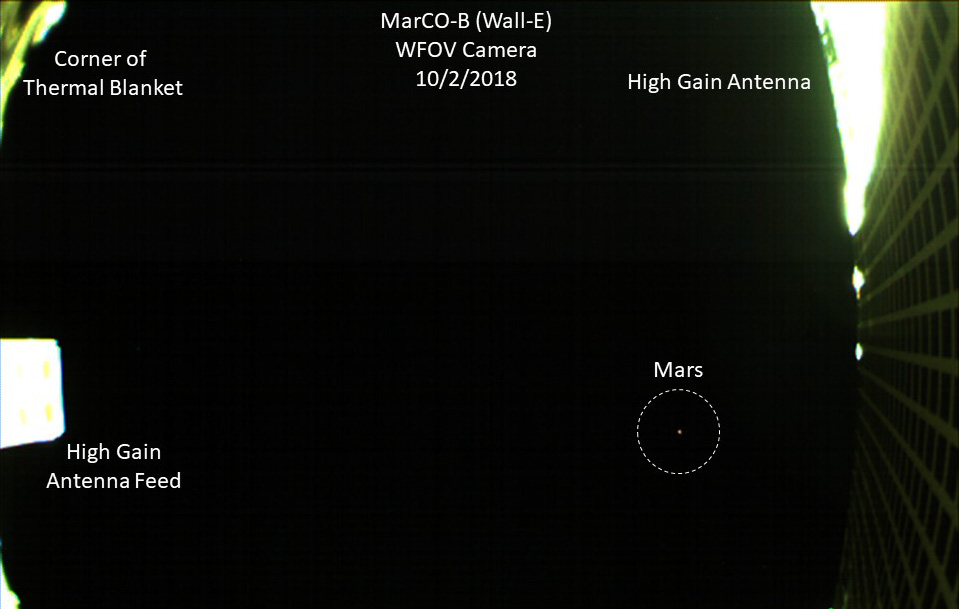
Mars (2 October 2018)

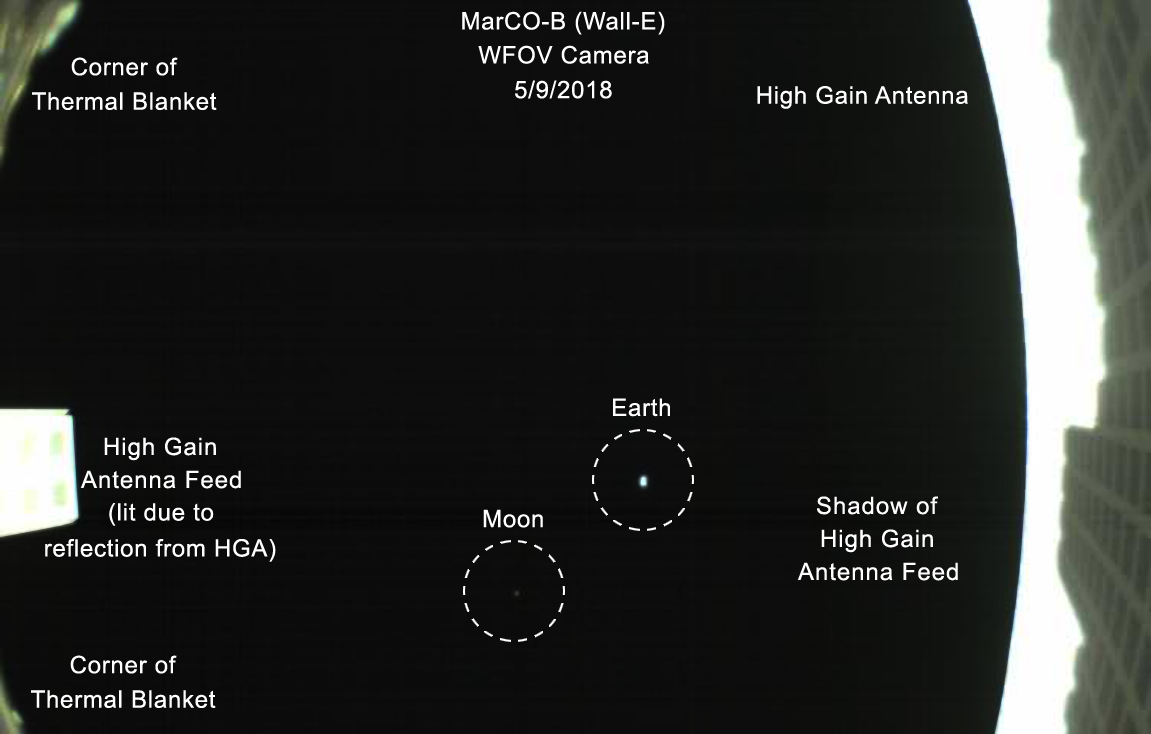
Earth and Moon (9 May 2018)

=== INSPIRE Mission ===
The Interplanetary Nano-Spacecraft Pathfinder in Relevant Environment (INSPIRE) is a planned NASA mission that will send CubeSats out of Earth’s orbit and into deep space. INSPIRE aims to demonstrate that CubeSats can operate, communicate, and be navigated outside of Earth’s orbit. The launch date of this mission is not yet determined.

== Programs ==
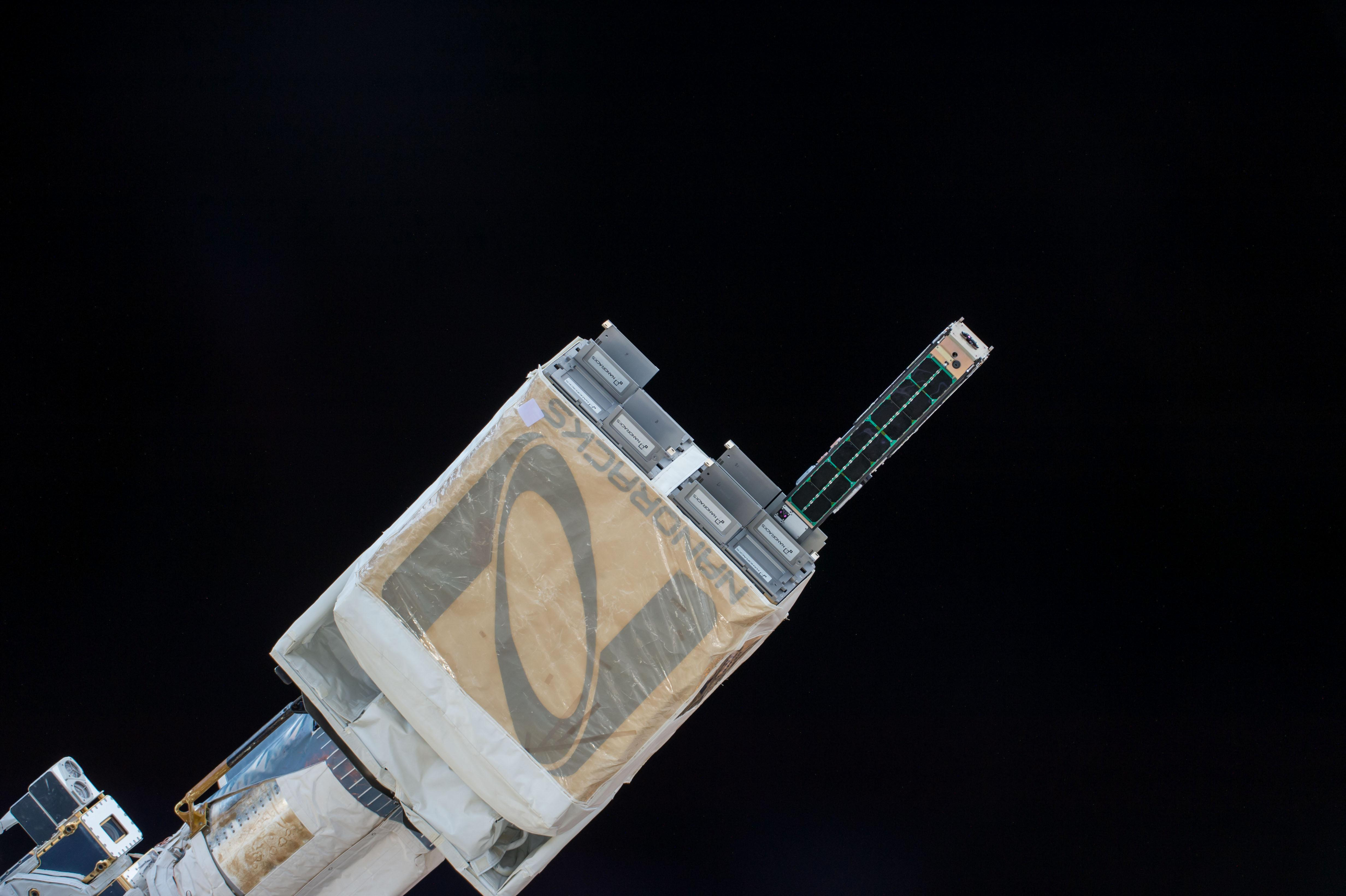
NanoRacks

=== CubeSat Launch Initiative ===
NASA's CubeSat Launch Initiative created in 2010, provides CubeSat launch opportunities to educational institutions, non-profit organizations and NASA Centers. As of 2016 the CubeSat Launch Initiative had launched 46 CubeSats flown on 12 ELaNa Missions from 28 unique organizations and has selected 119 CubeSat missions from 66 unique organizations. Educational Launch of Nanosatellites (ELaNa) missions have included: BisonSat the first CubeSat built by a tribal college, TJ3Sat the first CubeSat built by a high school and STMSat-1 the first CubeSat built by an elementary school. NASA releases an Announcement of Opportunity in August of each year with selections made the following February.

=== Artemis 1 ===
NASA initiated the Cube Quest Challenge in 2015, a competition to foster innovation in the use of CubeSats beyond low Earth orbit. The Cube Quest Challenge offered $5 million to teams that met the challenge objectives of designing, building and delivering flight-qualified, small satellites capable of advanced operations near and beyond the Moon. Teams competed for a variety of prizes in lunar orbit or deep space. 10 CubeSats from different teams were launched to cislunar space as secondary payloads on board the Artemis 1 in 2022.

=== ESA "Fly Your Satellite!" ===
"Fly Your Satellite!" is the ongoing CubeSats programme of the Education Office of the European Space Agency. University students have the opportunity to develop and implement their CubeSat mission with support of ESA specialists. Participating student teams can experience the full cycle from designing, building, and testing to eventually, the possibility of launching and operating their CubeSat. The fourth iteration of the Fly Your Satellite! programme closed a call for proposals in February 2022.

=== Canadian Cubesat Project ===
The Canadian Space Agency announced the Canadian CubeSat Project (CCP) in 2017, and the participating teams were selected in May of 2018. The programme provides funding and support to one university or college in each province and territory to develop a CubeSat for launch from the ISS. The objective of the CCP is to provide students with direct hands on experience in the space industry, while preparing them to enter into a career in the space domain.

=== QB50 ===
QB50 is a proposed international network of 50 CubeSats for multi-point, in-situ measurements in the lower thermosphere (90–350 km) and re-entry research. QB50 is an initiative of the Von Karman Institute and is funded by the European Commission as part of the 7th Framework Programme (FP7). Double-unit (2U) CubeSats (10×10×20 cm) are developed, with one unit (the 'functional' unit) providing the usual satellite functions and the other unit (the 'science' unit) accommodating a set of standardised sensors for lower thermosphere and re-entry research. 35 CubeSats are envisaged to be provided by universities from 22 countries around the world, among them 4 are from the US, 4 from China, 4 from France, 3 from Australia and 3 from South Korea. Ten 2U or 3U CubeSats are foreseen to serve for in-orbit technology demonstration of new space technologies.

The Request for Proposals (RFP) for the QB50 CubeSat was released on February 15, 2012. Two "precursor" QB50 satellites were launched aboard a Dnepr rocket on June 19, 2014. All 50 CubeSats were supposed to be launched together on a single Cyclone-4 launch vehicle in February 2016, but due to the unavailability of the launch vehicle, 36 satellites were launched aboard Cygnus CRS OA-7 on 18 April 2017 and subsequently deployed from the ISS. A dozen other CubeSats were manifested on the PSLV-XL C38 mission in May 2017.

== Launch and deployment ==
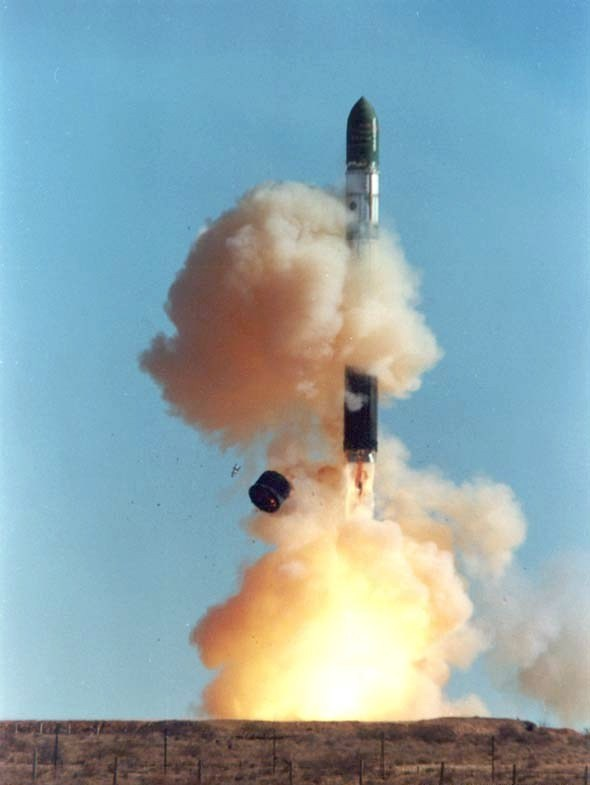
A Dnepr rocket launching from ISC Kosmotras

Unlike full-sized spacecraft, CubeSats can be delivered as cargo to, and deployed by, the International Space Station. This presents an alternative method of achieving orbit apart from deployment by a launch vehicle. NanoRacks and Made in Space are developing means of constructing CubeSats on the International Space Station.

=== Existing launch systems ===
NASA's CubeSat Launch Initiative launched more than 46 CubeSats on its ELaNa missions over the several years prior to 2016, and 57 were planned for flight over the next several years. No matter how inexpensive or versatile CubeSats may be, they must hitch rides as secondary payloads on large rockets launching much larger spacecraft, at prices starting around $100,000 as of 2015. Since CubeSats are deployed by P-PODs and similar deployment systems, they can be integrated and launched into virtually any launch vehicle. However, some launch service providers refuse to launch CubeSats, whether on all launches or only on specific launches, two examples as of 2015 were ILS and Sea Launch.

SpaceX, Exolaunch, and Space BD are three recent companies that offer commercial launch services for CubeSats as secondary payload, but a launch backlog still exists. Additionally, India's ISRO has been commercially launching foreign CubeSats since 2009 as secondary payloads. On 15 Feb 2017, ISRO set the world record by launching 103 CubeSats on board its Polar Satellite Launch Vehicle for various foreign companies. ISC Kosmotras and Eurockot also offer launch services for CubeSats. SpaceX beat the record in 2021 with the Transporter-1 (spaceflight) carrying 143 spacecraft to orbit. Rocket Lab specializes in launching CubeSats on its Electron from New Zealand.

=== Future and proposed launch systems ===
On 5 May 2015, NASA announced a program based at the Kennedy Space Center to develop a class of rockets designed to launch very small satellites: the NASA Venture Class Launch Services (VCLS), which will offer a payload mass of 30 kg to 60 kg for each launcher. Five months later, in October 2015, NASA awarded a total of $17.1 million to three separate startup launch companies for one flight each: $6.9 million to Rocket Lab (Electron rocket); $5.5 million to Firefly Space Systems (Alpha rocket); and $4.7 million to Virgin Galactic (LauncherOne rocket). The payloads for the three flights under the VCLS contract have not yet been assigned. Other small satellite launch systems are under development that would carry CubeSats alongside a small payload, including the Neptune series of rockets by Interorbital Systems, Garvey Spacecraft's Nanosat Launch Vehicle, and the SPARK rocket. In addition to conventional launch vehicles and facilitators like KSF Space, several air launch to orbit vehicles are in the works by Generation Orbit Launch Services and Boeing (in the form of their Small Launch Vehicle).

Many aspects of CubeSats such as structure, propulsion, material, computing and telecommunications, power, and additional specific instruments or measurement devices pose challenges to the use of CubeSat technology beyond Earth's orbit. These challenges have been increasingly under consideration of international organizations over the past decade, for example, proposed in 2012 by NASA and the Jet Propulsion Lab, the INSPIRE spacecraft is an initial attempt at a spacecraft designed to prove the operational abilities of deep space CubeSats. The launch date was expected to be 2014, but has yet to occur and the date is listed by NASA as TBD.

=== Deployment ===
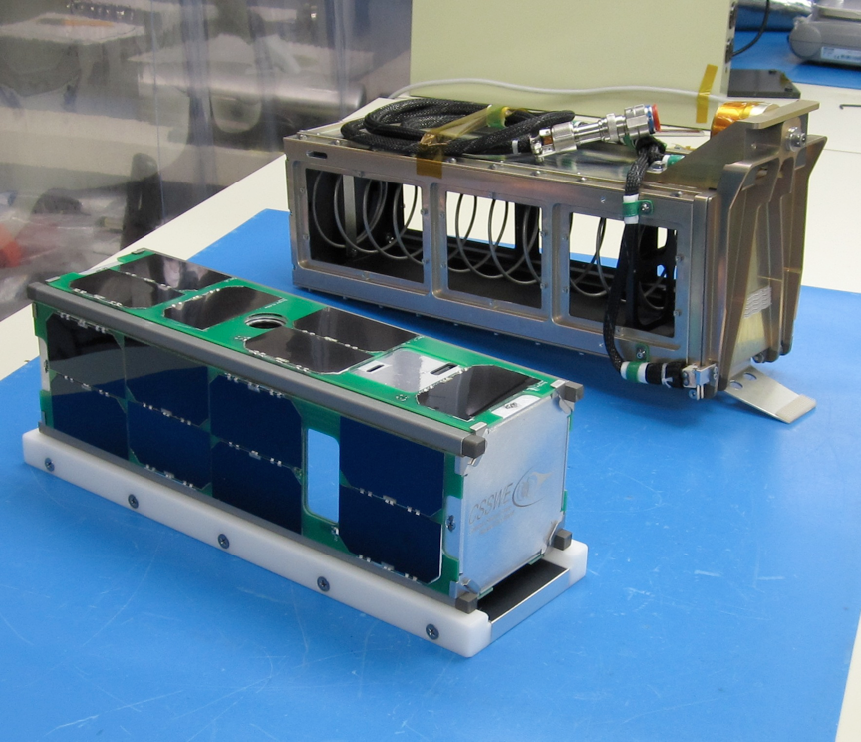
CSSWE next to its P-POD before integration and launch

P-PODs (Poly-PicoSatellite Orbital Deployers) were designed with CubeSats to provide a common platform for secondary payloads. P-PODs are mounted to a launch vehicle and carry CubeSats into orbit and deploy them once the proper signal is received from the launch vehicle. The P-POD Mk III has capacity for three 1U CubeSats, or other 0.5U, 1U, 1.5U, 2U, or 3U CubeSats combination up to a maximum volume of 3U. Other CubeSat deployers exist, with the NanoRacks CubeSat Deployer (NRCSD) on the International Space Station being the most popular method of CubeSat deployment as of 2014. Some CubeSat deployers are created by companies, such as the ISIPOD (Innovative Solutions In Space BV) or SPL (Astro und Feinwerktechnik Adlershof GmbH), while some have been created by governments or other non-profit institutions such as the X-POD (University of Toronto), T-POD (University of Tokyo), or the J-SSOD (JAXA) on the International Space Station. While the P-POD is limited to launching a 3U CubeSat at most, the NRCSD can launch a 6U (10 cm × 10 cm × 68.1 cm (3.9 in × 3.9 in × 26.8 in)) CubeSat and the ISIPOD can launch a different form of 6U CubeSat (10 cm × 22.63 cm × 34.05 cm (3.94 in × 8.91 in × 13.41 in)).

While nearly all CubeSats are deployed from a launch vehicle or the International Space Station, some are deployed by the primary payloads themselves. For example, FASTSAT deployed the NanoSail-D2, a 3U CubeSat. This was done again with the Cygnus Mass Simulator as the primary payload launched on the maiden flight of the Antares rocket, carrying and later deploying four CubeSats. For CubeSat applications beyond Earth's orbit, the method of deploying the satellites from the primary payload will also be adopted. Ten CubeSats were launched on the Artemis 1, placing them in the vicinity of the Moon. InSight, a Mars lander, also sent CubeSats beyond Earth orbit to use them as relay communications satellites. Known as MarCO A and B, they are the first CubeSats sent beyond the Earth–Moon system.

Chasqui I saw a unique deployment process, when it was deployed by hand during a spacewalk on the International Space Station in 2014.

== See also ==
- AMSAT
- Canadian Advanced Nanospace eXperiment Program
- CubeRover, a similar concept applied to small rovers
- Cubesat Space Protocol
- Israeli Nano Satellite Association
- List of CubeSats
- Nanosatellite Launch System
- OSCAR
- PocketQube, a similar but smaller format measuring 5x5x5 cm
