= RaInCube =

American experimental satellite

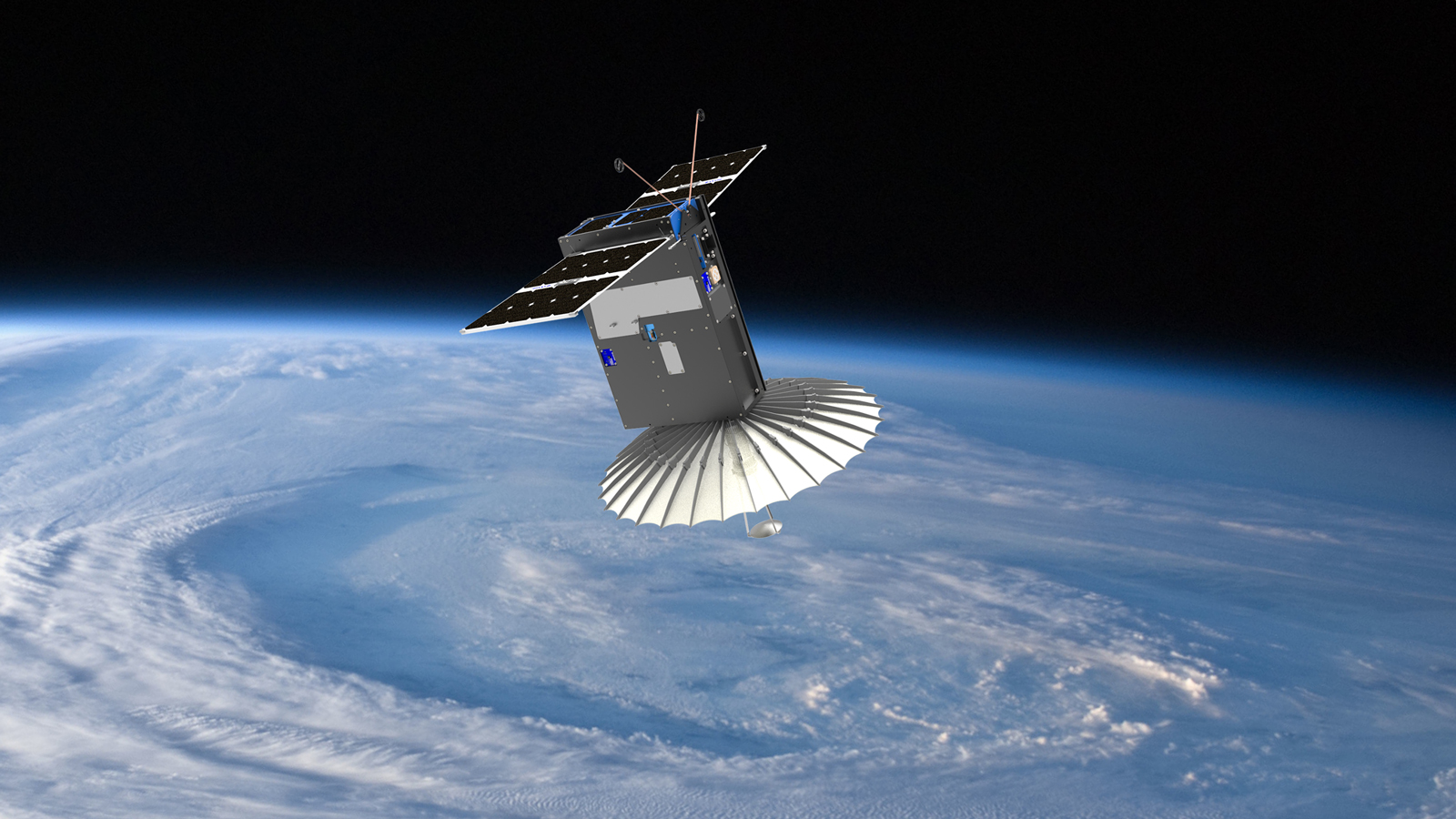
- Names: RainCube
- Mission type: Technology demonstration
- Operator: NASA/JPL/Tyvak
- COSPAR ID: 1998-067NW
- SATCAT no.: 43548
- Website: Website
- Mission duration: 2 years, 5 months and 10 days

Spacecraft properties
- Spacecraft type: 6U CubeSat
- Manufacturer: NASA/JPL/Tyvak
- Launch mass: 12kg
- Dimensions: 10 × 20 × 30 cm (3.9 × 7.9 × 11.8 in)

Start of mission
- Launch date: May 21, 2018, 08:44:06 UTC
- Rocket: Antares 230
- Launch site: Wallops Pad 0A
- Contractor: Orbital ATK
- Deployed from: International Space Station
- Deployment date: July 13, 2018

End of mission
- Disposal: Reentry
- Decay date: Dec. 24, 2020

Orbital parameters
- Reference system: Geocentric
- Regime: Low Earth
- Perigee altitude: 399 km (248 mi)
- Apogee altitude: 407 km (253 mi)
- Inclination: 51.64°

Transponders
- Band: Ka band

Instruments
- Ka band radar

RaInCube, also stylized as RainCube, was a 6U CubeSat made by NASA as an experimental satellite. The bus was built by Tyvak Nano-Satellite Systems. It had a small radar and an antenna. It was put into orbit in May 2018 and was deployed from the International Space Station on June 25, 2018. It re-entered Earth's atmosphere and burned up on Dec. 24, 2020. It was used to track large storms.

== Mission objectives ==
RainCube's mission objectives were to:

- Demonstrate low-cost Ka band radar technology, with a vertical resolution of 250m and a horizontal resolution of at least 10 km. Its radar sensitivity should also be better than 20dBZ.
- Use Ka-band radar from a 6U CubeSat
- Profiling precipitation falling on Earth

== Launch and deployment ==
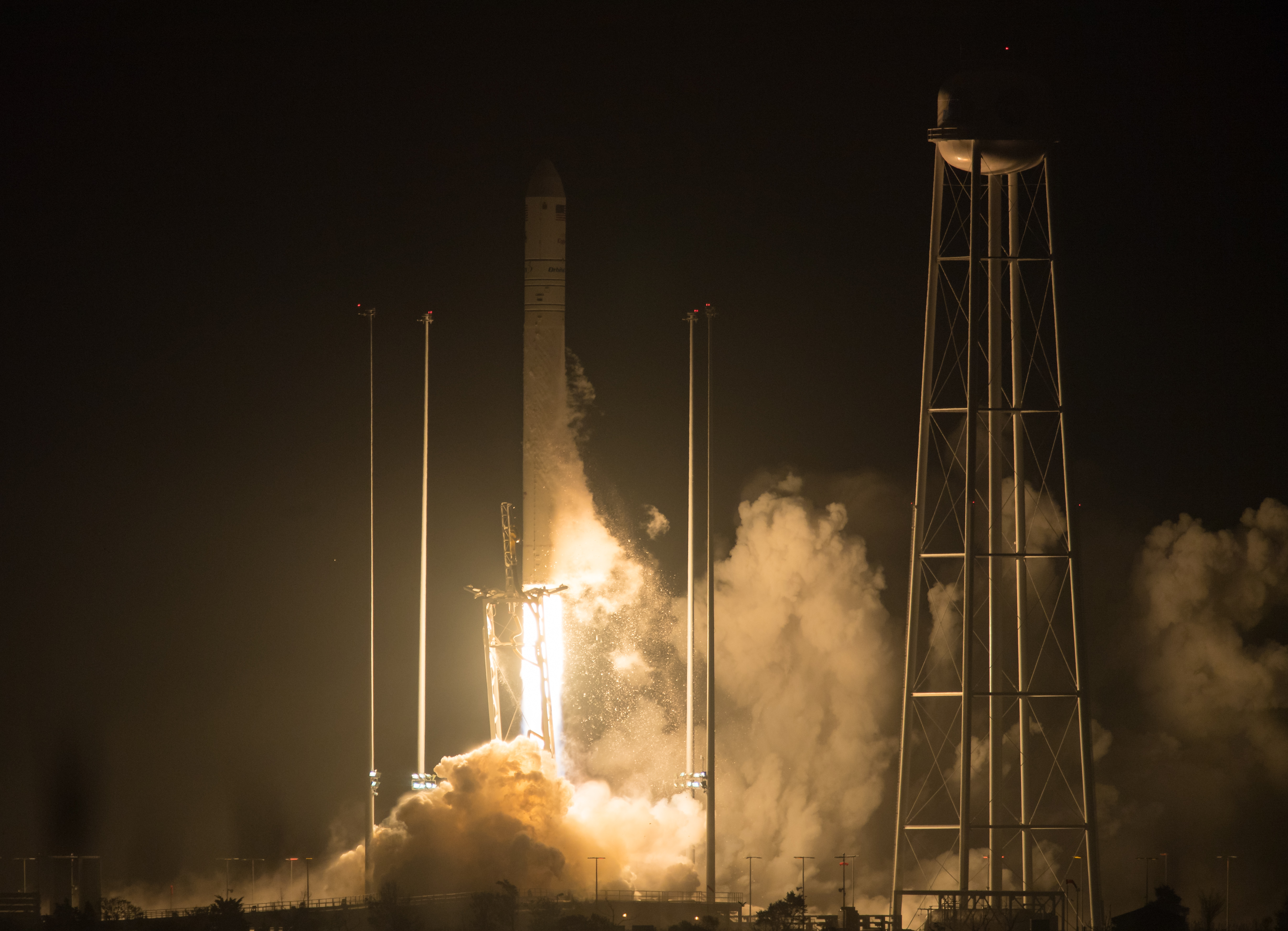
Launch of an Antares 230 rocket with Cygnus OA-9E

RaInCube was launched as part of the Cygnus OA-9E Commercial Resupply Services mission on board an Antares 230 rocket on May 21, 2018, at Wallops Pad 0A. The Cygnus spacecraft docked with the International Space Station on May 24, 2018, three days later. RaInCube was finally deployed from the International Space Station on July 13, 2018.

== Gallery ==
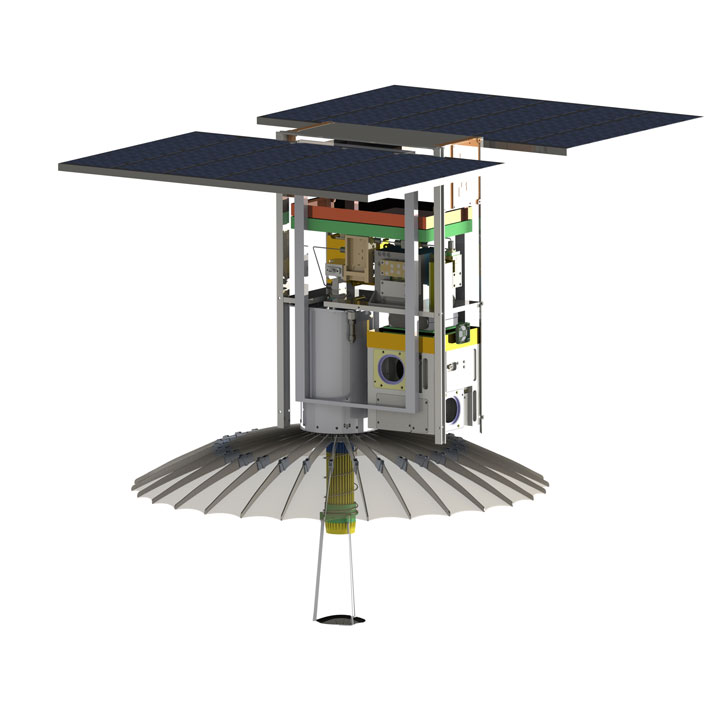
Render of RaInCube

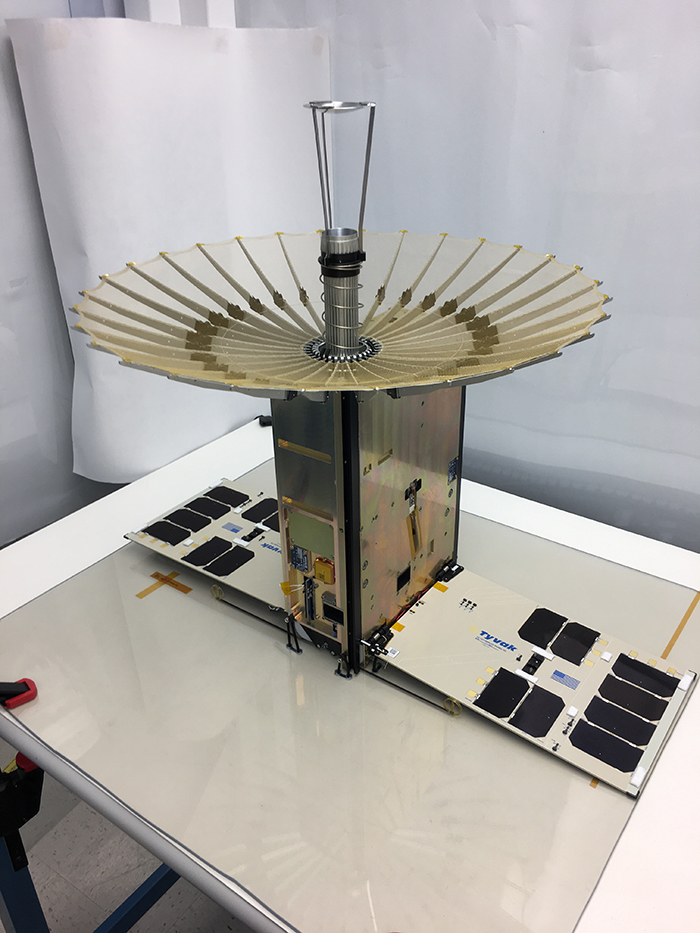
RaInCube on Earth

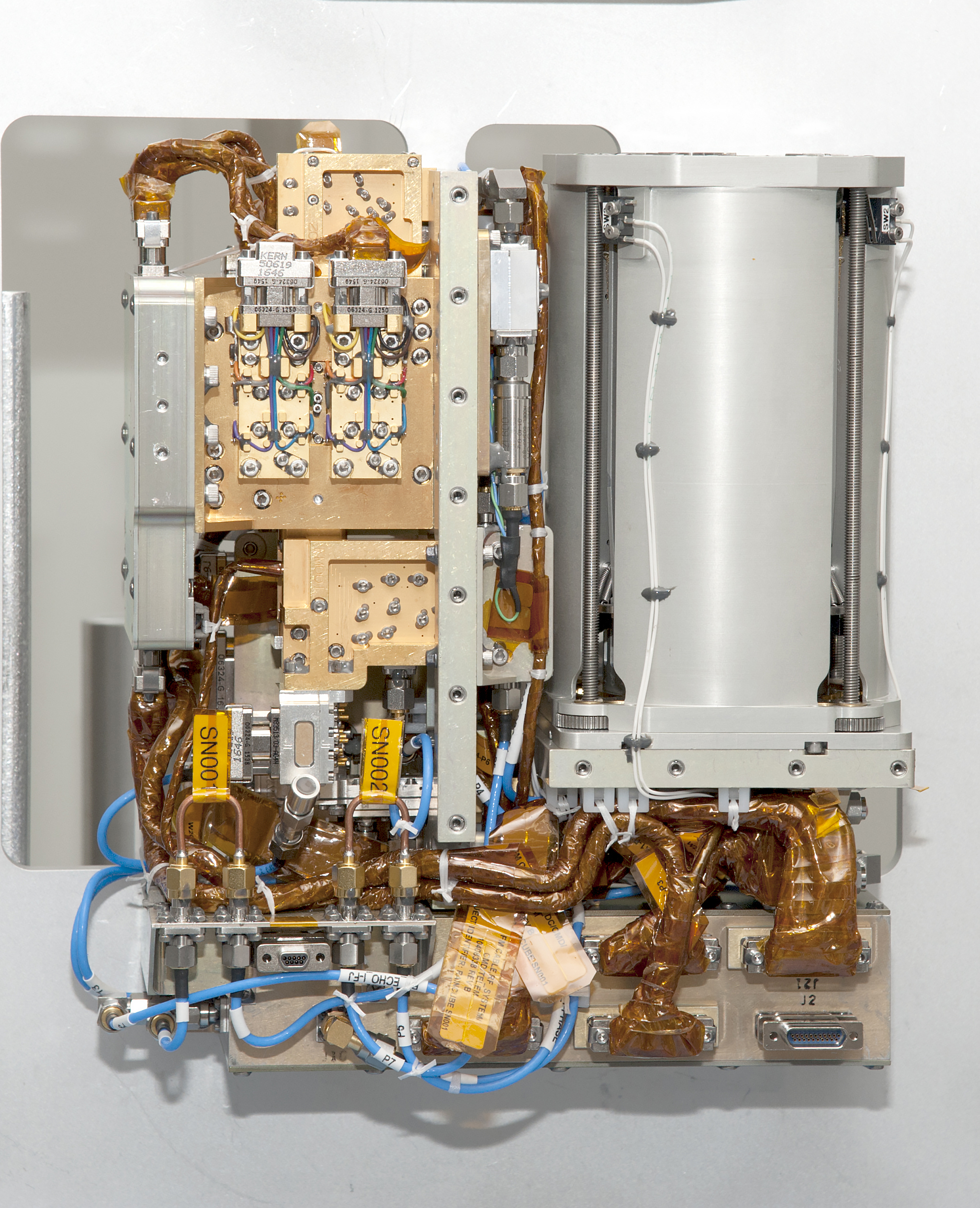
RaInCube's interior

RaInCube's antenna opening
