= Ecuadorian Civilian Space Agency =

Non-profit space organization

- Agencia Espacial Civil Ecuatoriana
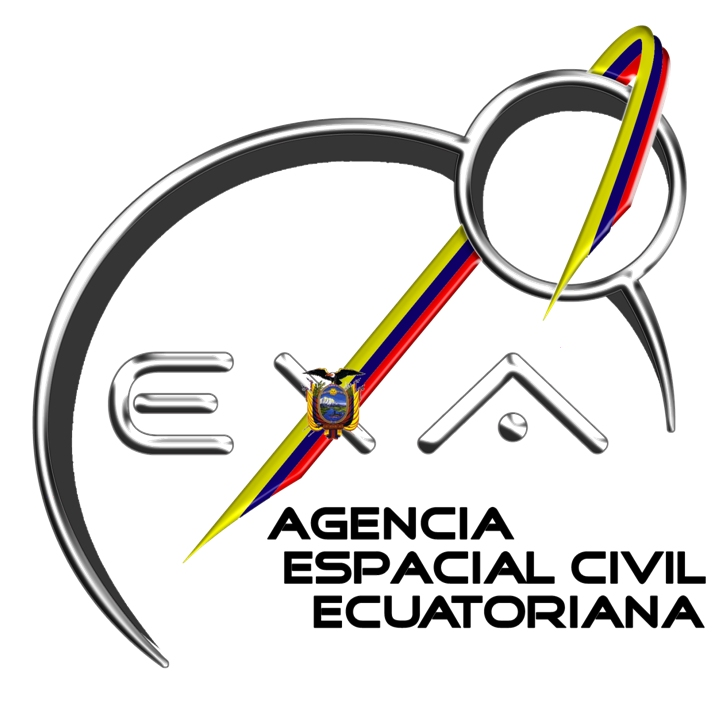

Agency overview
- Formed: November 1, 2007
- Type: Space agency
- Headquarters: Guayaquil, Ecuador
- Motto: Ex Sominus Ad Astra (Note: The motto is meant to convey "From a dream to the stars," as the website says. However, the Latin is incorrect; the non-word sominus has been substituted for the correct word somnio.)
- Administrator: Hector Carrion (2009-Present)
- Owner: Ecuador
- Website: EXA.ec

The Ecuadorian Civilian Space Agency (EXA; Spanish: Agencia Espacial Civil Ecuatoriana) is a private Ecuadorian organization founded in 2007 that conducts research on space and planetary sciences. It is a non-profit non-governmental organization with civilian oversight.

EXA had tested microgravity via parabolic flight with the Ecuadorian Air Force. EXA launched Ecuador's first satellite, the CubeSat NEE-01 Pegaso, in April 2013 aboard a Chinese Long March 2D. Its second satellite, the follow-on CubeSat NEE-02 Krysaor, was launched from Russia aboard a Dnepr rocket in November 2013.
