= NEE-01 Pegaso =

Ecuadorian technology demonstration satellite

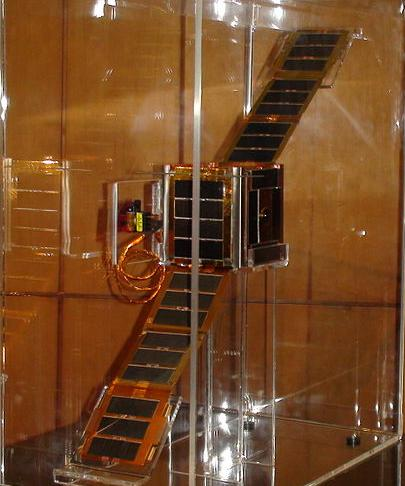
- Mission type: Technology demonstration
- Operator: Ecuadorian Civilian Space Agency
- COSPAR ID: 2013-018B
- SATCAT no.: 39151
- Website: pegaso.exa.ec
- Mission duration: Design: 1 year Elapsed: 11 years, 11 months, 2 days
- Orbits completed: 42,192

Spacecraft properties
- Spacecraft type: 1U CubeSat
- Manufacturer: Ecuadorian Civilian Space Agency
- Launch mass: 1.266 kg (2.79 lb)
- Dimensions: 10×10×75 cm (3.9×3.9×29.5 in)
- Power: 107 watts maximum

Start of mission
- Launch date: 26 April 2013, 04:13 UTC
- Rocket: Long March 2D
- Launch site: Jiuquan, LA-4/SLS-2
- Entered service: 5 May 2013

Orbital parameters
- Reference system: Geocentric
- Regime: Sun-synchronous
- Semi-major axis: 7,006.53 km (4,353.66 mi)
- Eccentricity: 0.001754
- Perigee altitude: 616.11 km (382.83 mi)
- Apogee altitude: 640.69 km (398.11 mi)
- Inclination: 97.9743°
- Period: 97.28 minutes
- Mean motion: 14.80
- Epoch: 17 February 2021, 12:19:30 UTC

NEE-01 Pegaso (Spanish pronunciation: [peˈɣaso], "Pegasus") is an Ecuadorian technology demonstration satellite, and Ecuador's first satellite launched to space. Built by the Ecuadorian Civilian Space Agency (EXA), it is a nanosatellite of the single-unit CubeSat class. The spacecraft's instruments include a dual visible and infrared camera which allows the spacecraft to take pictures and transmit live video from space.

== Construction and launch ==
After the completion of its HERMES-A ground station in April 2010, EXA authorised the construction of Ecuador's first satellite. A number of restrictions and demands were imposed on the project: EXA was solely responsible for the spacecraft design and technology research, all construction had to take place within Ecuador, the project must be "future-enabling" and result in a technological breakthrough, and its mission must be educational in nature. The completed Pegaso was presented to the public on 4 April 2011. All research and construction of the satellite was performed by Ecuadorian personnel at a cost of US$30,000. Funding for testing and launch services was provided by the Ecuadorian Defense Ministry.

While originally planned to be orbited by a Russian Dnepr, delays with the rocket forced EXA to move the satellite's launch to China. Pegaso was eventually launched as a secondary payload aboard a Chinese Long March 2D from the Jiuquan Satellite Launch Center's SLS Pad 2 on 26 April 2013, 04:13 UTC. It was placed into an elliptical orbit around Earth of approximately 600 by 900 kilometres (370 by 560 mi).

== Mission and spacecraft systems ==
The primary objective of Pegaso was to operate in space and transmit spacecraft telemetry for at least one year. In that time, it was intended to test various on-board systems and technologies, as well as serve as an educational tool for grade school students and undergraduates.

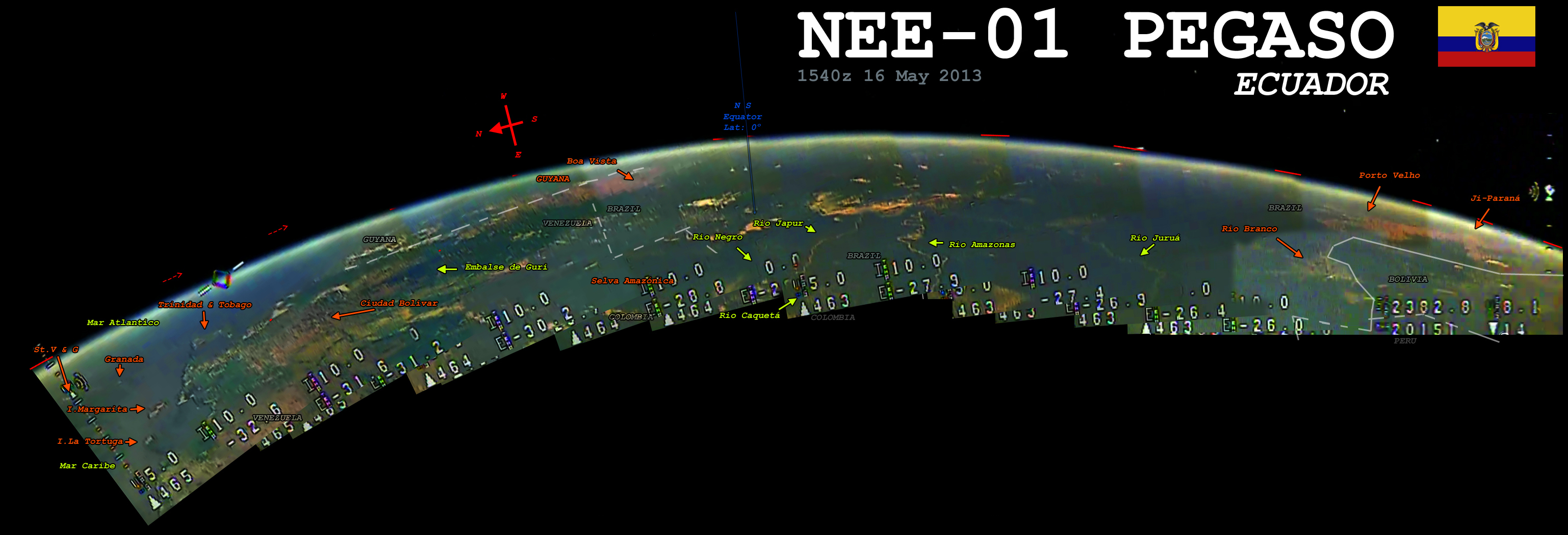
Mosaic of images from Pegaso's first publicly released video

The satellite's primary instrument is a 720p HD camera, provided by EarthCam, capable of recording in both visible and infrared light. This video, along with telemetry and other data, was broadcast from the spacecraft to the HERMES-A ground station via a three-watt television transmitter. It was meant to allow the public to view live video of the Earth from orbit and give researchers the capability to search for near-Earth objects.

To protect against damaging environmental factors, Pegaso employs the Space Environment Attenuation Manifold (SEAM/NEMEA), a multi-layer polymer insulation which is designed to block alpha and beta particles, X-ray and gamma radiation, and up to 67% of incoming heat. The insulation additionally provides the spacecraft some degree of protection against EMP and plasma discharge events, and allows Pegaso to retain heat during orbital night. Further thermal control is obtained with a thin sheet of carbon nanotubes layered over a heat-reflecting surface, which helps to equalise the temperature throughout the vehicle.

The spacecraft's solar panels, at 1.5 millimetres (0.059 in) thick, are among the thinnest ever deployed on a satellite. Pegaso's 57 solar cells are capable of generating 14.25 watts and feed 32 on-board 900 mA·h batteries, producing a maximum of 107 watts available power. The solar panel and antenna deployment systems made use of memory metals, passively activated by solar radiation, which allowed for smoother deployment and less agitation of the vehicle's attitude.

For passive attitude control, Pegaso uses a series of magnets and inertial-magnetic dampers for single-axis alignment along Earth's magnetic field.

== Collision with debris ==
=== Apparent loss ===
The satellite operated normally until 23 May 2013; at approximately 05:38 UTC, Pegaso passed very close to the spent upper stage of a 1985 Tsyklon-3 rocket over the Indian Ocean. While there was no direct collision between the satellite and upper stage, Pegaso is believed to have suffered a "glancing blow" after passing through a debris cloud around the Tsyklon stage and striking one of the small pieces. After the incident, the satellite was found to be "spinning wildly over two of its axes" and unable to communicate with its ground station. While efforts were made to reestablish control of Pegaso, on 28 August 2013 the decision was made by EXA and the Ecuadorian government to declare the satellite lost.

=== Recovery ===
On 25 January 2014, EXA recovered the audio segment of the Pegaso signal during the first public transmission from NEE-02 Krysaor, verifying that Pegaso had survived its collision with the Tsyklon debris and was operating. EXA announced that it had installed a miniature repeater device aboard Krysaor called PERSEUS, and that this was used to recover the Pegaso signal.

== See also ==
- List of CubeSats
- First satellites
