= Israeli Nano Satellite Association =

Israeli organization promoting the use of nanosatellites

The Israeli Nano Satellite Association was set up in Israel in 2006, with the aim of promoting the use of nanosatellites (very small artificial satellites).

== History ==
In 2004 a group of young space engineers and scientists from leading companies and universities in Israel, started studying nanosatellites constellations and applications. INSA - the Israeli Nano Satellite Association was founded in 2006 by this group.

== Mission ==
INSA's mission is to promote the usage of nanosatellites in Israel for various academic and commercial purposes. INSA is also dedicated to promoting space education, technology and science awareness throughout Israel by leading civil nanosatellites projects.

INSA aspires to be involved in every nanosatellite project in Israel.

== INSA projects ==
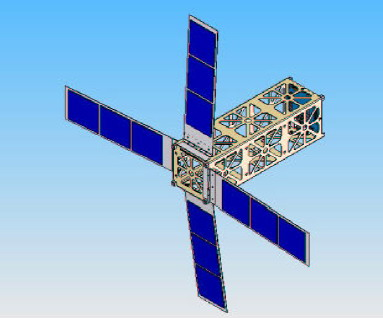

- Nanosatellites Accurate Positioning System (NAPS) is a constellation of nanosatellites that are used to find accurate position, the concept was first presented in Tel Aviv University, evoked great responses and triggered the interest of the Israeli space industry in nanosatellites.
- Space Qualification and Heritage Nanosatellites (SQHN). As part of the SQHN project, INSA started construction on two nanosatellites (INSAT-1 and INSAT-2), weighing less than 10 kg each, carrying novel components developed by Israeli Hi-tech companies such as Rokar, Accubeat and Ramonchips. INSA planned to launch the satellites on a Dnepr rocket launcher from Baikonur by the end of 2008.
- In January 2011 INSA completed development of the first Israeli-made satellite designed for experimental work in space. Named as InKlajn-1, it was intended for launch in 2011 or 2012, and weighed about 1.5kg.

== International activities ==
INSA is also an official sponsor of CUSAT, a Cornell university satellite project, along with NASA, AFRL, AGI, Boeing, LORAL, ORBITAL, AIAA and many others. The professional support of INSA experts was one of the reasons for the Cornell team selection out of 11 different projects to be fully funded (selection done by the AFRL). In the future, INSA will continue supporting CUSAT team and will provide ground receiving services with the collaboration of ASRI ground station.

INSA is also the Israeli representative of Pumpkin who is a manufacturer of CubeSat kits.

== Events ==
On May 15, 2007, INSA held the first Israeli symposium on nanosatellites, in IAF House in Herzliya.

On January 31, 2008, INSA held the second Israeli symposium on nanosatellites, as part of the Israeli 3rd International Space Convention. It took place in IAF House in Herzliya.

== See also ==
- Science and technology in Israel
