= Miniature X-ray Solar Spectrometer CubeSat =

NASA satellite

MinXSS
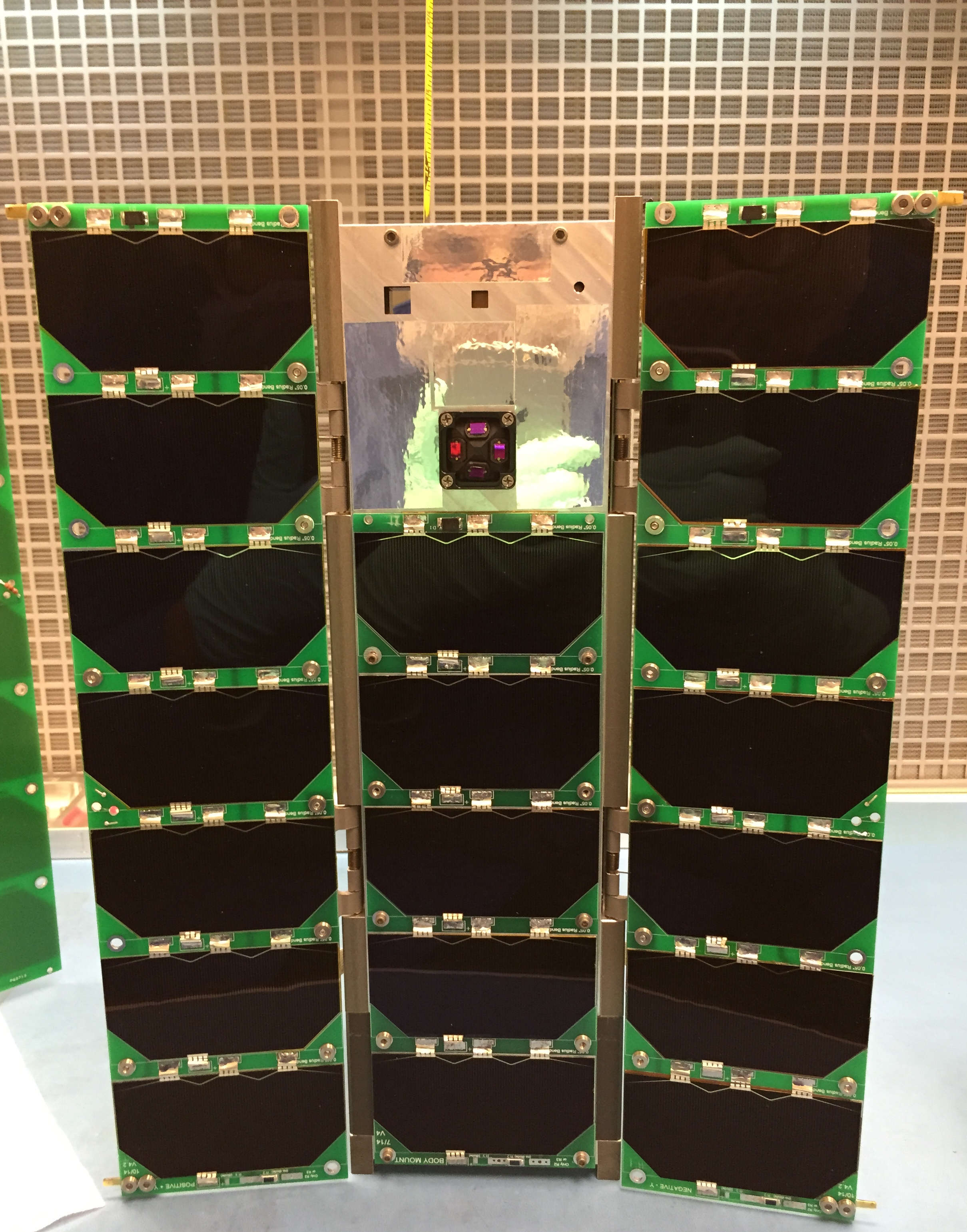
- The sun-facing side of the MinXSS spacecraft. The two hinged solar panels are in their deployed state. The science instrument apertures can be seen near the top. The tape-measure antenna extends beyond the top of the photo. Image taken after final integration of the spacecraft.
- Mission type: Solar physics, Space weather, Near space research
- Operator: CU/LASP
- COSPAR ID: 1998-067HU
- SATCAT no.: 41474U
- Website: lasp.colorado.edu/home/minxss
- Mission duration: Flight model 1: 6 months (planned), 11.66 months (actual); Flight model 2: 5 years (planned); 9 years (elasped)

Spacecraft properties
- Spacecraft type: 3U CubeSat
- Manufacturer: CU/LASP
- Launch mass: 3.5163 kg
- Dry mass: 3.5163 kg
- Power: Consumes: 8.0 W (science mode); 5.3 W (safe mode); 2.8 W (phoenix mode); Max generation: 19 W

Start of mission
- Launch date: December 6, 2015, 08:44:57 UTC
- Rocket: Atlas V 401
- Launch site: Kennedy Space Center
- Contractor: United Launch Alliance
- Entered service: 2016 May 16

End of mission
- Last contact: 2017-05-06 02:37:26 UTC
- Decay date: 2017 May 6

Orbital parameters
- Reference system: Geocentric
- Regime: Low Earth
- Perigee altitude: 402 kilometers (250 mi)
- Apogee altitude: 402 kilometers (250 mi)
- Inclination: 51.65 degrees
- Period: 92.69 minutes
- Epoch: July 4, 2016

Instruments
- Modified Amptek X123 silicon drift detector Sun Position Sensor (SPS), X-ray Photometer (XP)

The Miniature X-ray Solar Spectrometer (MinXSS) CubeSat was the first launched National Aeronautics and Space Administration Science Mission Directorate CubeSat with a science mission. It was designed, built, and operated primarily by students at the University of Colorado Boulder with professional mentorship and involvement from professors, scientists, and engineers in the Aerospace Engineering Sciences department and the Laboratory for Atmospheric and Space Physics, as well as Southwest Research Institute, NASA Goddard Space Flight Center, and the National Center for Atmospheric Research's High Altitude Observatory. The mission principal investigator is Dr. Thomas N. Woods and co-investigators are Dr. Amir Caspi, Dr. Phil Chamberlin, Dr. Andrew Jones, Rick Kohnert, Professor Xinlin Li, Professor Scott Palo, and Dr. Stanley Solomon. The student lead (project manager, systems engineer) was Dr. James Paul Mason, who has since become a Co-I for the second flight model of MinXSS.

MinXSS launched on 2015 December 6 to the International Space Station as part of the Orbital ATK Cygnus CRS OA-4 cargo resupply mission. The launch vehicle was a United Launch Alliance Atlas V rocket in the 401 configuration. CubeSat ridesharing was organized as part of NASA ELaNa-IX. Deployment from the International Space Station was achieved with a NanoRacks CubeSat Deployer on 2016 May 16. Spacecraft beacons were picked up soon after by amateur radio operators around the world. Commissioning of the spacecraft was completed on 2016 June 14 and observations of solar flares captured nearly continuously since then. The altitude rapidly decayed in the last week of the mission as atmospheric drag increased exponentially with altitude. The last contact from MinXSS came on 2017-05-06 at 02:37:26 UTC from a HAM operator in Australia. At that time, some temperatures on the spacecraft were already in excess of 100 °C. (One temperature of >300 °C indicated that the solar panel had disconnected, suggesting this contact was only moments before disintegration.) Science data spanning the entire mission are publicly available.

== Mission objective ==
The MinXSS mission is to measure the solar soft X-ray spectrum from about 0.5 keV (25 Å) to 30 keV (0.4 Å) with ~0.15 keV FWHM spectral resolution. This part of the solar electromagnetic spectrum is where the largest enhancement from solar flares is expected to occur. It also has an important impact on Earth ionospheric chemistry. Despite this, prior measurements have been either low-resolution broadband, or high-resolution but very narrow bandpass (see image below). The relatively recent creation of miniaturized silicon drift detectors has enabled the MinXSS measurements. MinXSS data will provide a means of probing the solar corona—especially in active regions and solar flares—and will be used as an input for models of the Earth's upper atmosphere, particularly the ionosphere, thermosphere, and mesosphere.

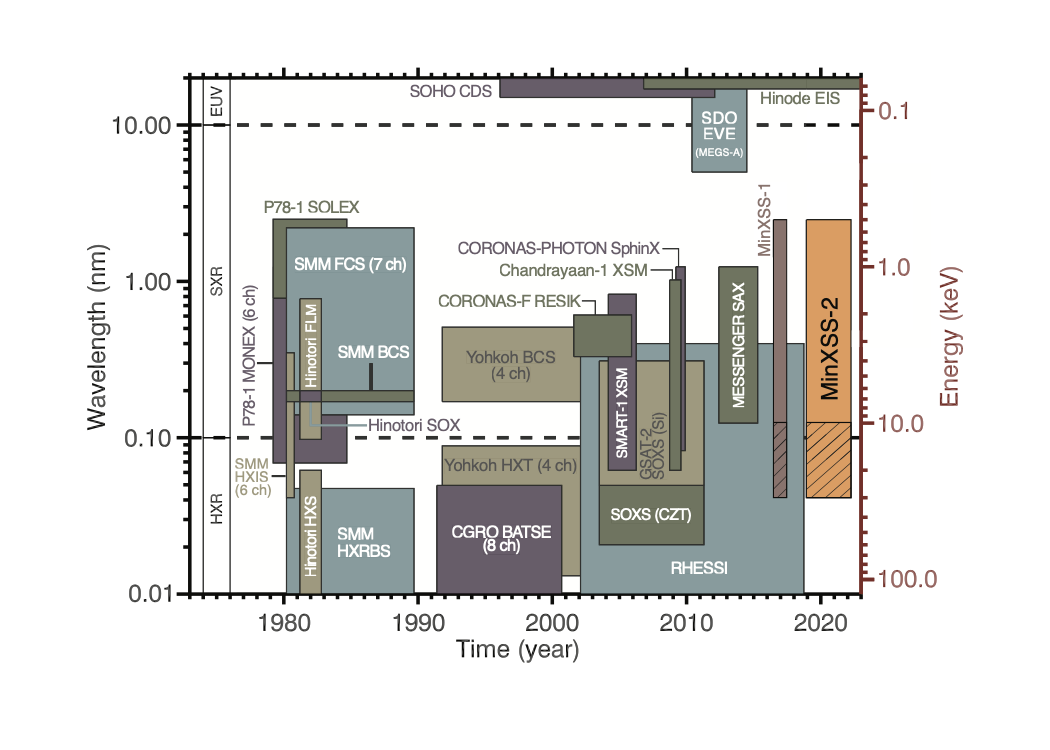
Solar soft X-ray measurement history

MinXSS is also the first flight of the Blue Canyon Technologies XACT attitude determination and control system (ADCS), one of the only commercially available 3-axis ADCSs for CubeSats. It is performing even better than its specification. This demonstrates that a critical technology for spacecraft has been successfully miniaturized and commercialized.

== Science instrument ==
The primary science instrument onboard MinXSS is a modified Amptek X123 silicon drift detector. The instrument was modified to make it compatible with a space environment. Specifically, heat transfer pads were placed on the hottest components of the electronics boards to provide a conductive thermal path for heat transfer. In atmosphere, the electronics can cool convectively, but operation in vacuum requires cooling via conduction and hence an improved conductive path. Additionally, a small aperture made of tungsten was attached to the front of the detector to reduce the likelihood of photon saturation and limit the field of view to ±4º. Finally, an additional beryllium filter was mounted in front of the detector to reduce the number of photoelectrons reaching the detector.

There are two secondary science instruments: the X-ray Photometer (XP) and the Sun Position Sensor (SPS). XP is a single photodiode with a beryllium filter in front of it of nearly identical thickness to the sum of the two beryllium filters in front of the X123. The purpose of XP is provide an on-orbit cross-calibration for the X123: the sum of the X123 spectrum should be approximately equal to the XP measurement. SPS is a fine Sun sensor with 2.4 arcsec precision that consists of a planar quad-diode observing visible light, whose purpose is to provide fine knowledge of the solar position with respect to the X123 and XP optical axes to correct for any off-axis signal attenuation.

All instruments were calibrated at the National Institute of Standards and Technology's Synchrotron Ultraviolet Radiation Facility (SURF III).

== Pre-flight testing ==
Despite the loose requirements placed on CubeSats compared to larger spacecraft missions, MinXSS underwent the same rigorous tests that are considered standard in the aerospace industry. The X123 primary science instrument was fully flight-qualified on two sounding rocket flights. In addition to subsystem-level and system-level testing at the bench (i.e. in air at room temperature), the system also underwent thermal vacuum chamber cycle testing, thermal balance testing, vibration testing, and end-to-end communications testing. Mission simulations were performed during thermal vacuum cycling and at the bench using a solar array simulator that was autonomously power toggled with realistic orbital insolation and eclipse periods. This ensured that the spacecraft would be power-positive on orbit.

== Communications ==
The spacecraft uses a measuring tape antenna and an AstroDev Li-1 radio. The spacecraft periodically beacons and its signal can be picked up with amateur ham radio operator equipment. Below are the communications specifications:

- Frequency: 437.345 MHz
- Data rate: 9600 baud
- Modulation: GMSK
- Beacon cadence: (as of 2016/07/04) 54 seconds

Beacons recorded by ham radio operators can be sent to the MinXSS team (in KISS format) to contribute to overall data capture.

== On-Orbit success ==
The first critical hurdle for any deployed spacecraft is to establish communications with the ground. This was achieved on the first pass over the MinXSS ground station in Boulder, Colorado. As a science mission, success is determined by receipt of useful scientific measurements. MinXSS first light was presented at a press briefing and a contributed poster during the American Astronomical Society's 47th Solar Physics Division Meeting in Boulder, Colorado. Over 40 GOES C-class and 7 M-class solar flares occurred in the first weeks of the MinXSS mission, and those observations were downlinked to the ground for analysis. The results of those analyses will be the subjects of several upcoming peer-review papers. Additionally, MinXSS was the first flight of the Blue Canyon Technologies XACT 3-axis attitude determination and control system (ADCS). It continuously performed exceptionally, with 8 arcsecond (1-sigma) pointing, where the specification was for 11 arcseconds.

== Follow-on mission (MinXSS-2) ==
A second MinXSS spacecraft was built in parallel with the first. MinXSS-2 is identical to MinXSS-1 except for:

- (1) an upgraded version of the X-ray spectrometer, the Amptek X123-FastSDD, vs. the X123-SDD on MinXSS-1;
- (2) an upgraded version of the BCT XACT, using the current on-market hardware vs. the pre-release version used on MinXSS-1;
- (3) addition of a circuit for in-flight "hard reset" power cycle;
- (4) use of the AstroDev Lithium-2 radio vs. the Li-1 used on MinXSS-1; and
- (5) minor software updates.

MinXSS-2 is planned to deploy from the Spaceflight Industries SSO-A SmallSat Express mission, using a SpaceX Falcon 9. Launch happened on 3 December 2018, and MinXSS2 was deployed to orbit. The MinXSS-2 orbit is polar and Sun-synchronous at 10:30am LTDN, at approximately 575 km altitude, providing an estimated 4-year mission life.

MinXSS-2 was selected for 2 years of funding by NASA under the 2016 Heliophysics Technology and Instrument Development for Science (H-TIDeS) program. MinXSS-2 also adds science involvement from the Naval Research Laboratory, with Dr. Harry Warren added as a co-investigator.

== Awards ==
MinXSS was chosen as the 2016 AIAA Small Satellite Mission of the Year during the 30th Annual AIAA/USU Small Satellite Conference in Logan, UT.

== Project architecture ==
The MinXSS project was structured after the Colorado Student Space Weather Experiment CubeSat, which established the graduate projects course led by Joseph R. Tanner in the Aerospace Engineering Sciences department at the University of Colorado Boulder. Students in the department have the choice to either complete a Master's thesis or take two semesters of the graduate projects course. Typically, 10-20 students will be involved in each of the concurrent projects. CSSWE and MinXSS heavily leveraged professionals at the Laboratory for Atmospheric and Space Physics. As of 2018 March 8, 40 graduate, 5 undergraduate, and two high school students have worked on the project. Roughly 40 professionals have contributed with varying levels of involvement, from providing feedback at design reviews to writing flight software.
