= Launch Unit =

Proposed satellite production standard

LaunchU (also known as Launch Unit/Launch-U) is a proposed size/mass class standard for small satellites. The maximum volume of the LaunchU is 45 by 45 by 60 centimetres (18 in × 18 in × 24 in) with a mass of 60 to 80 kilograms (130 to 180 lb).

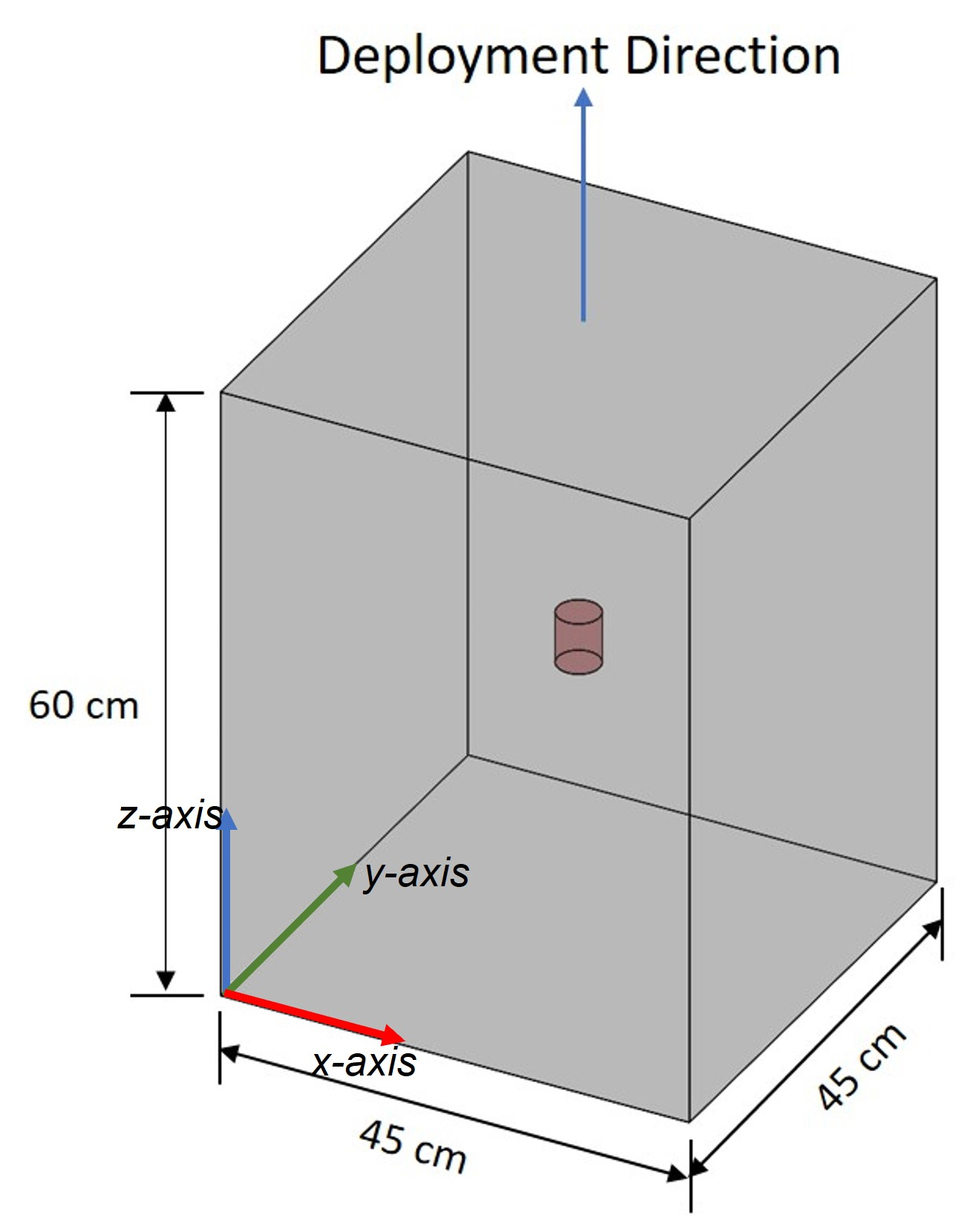
LaunchU Volume and Deployment Direction

In 2017, The Aerospace Corporation (Aerospace) held discussions with members of the satellite launch community to tackle difficult problems in the spaceflight industry such as "Why can't I get a slot and launch tomorrow?" From those discussions, Aerospace established a working group with representatives from industry, academia, and government to look at the launch interface and how standards might improve launch options. The consortium developed recommendations for a satellite between a 12U CubeSat (approximately 24 x 23 x 36 cm and 25 kg) and the EELV Secondary Payload Adapter (ESPA) class satellite (approximately 61 by 71 by 97 centimetres [24 in × 28 in × 38 in] and 200 kilograms [440 lb]).

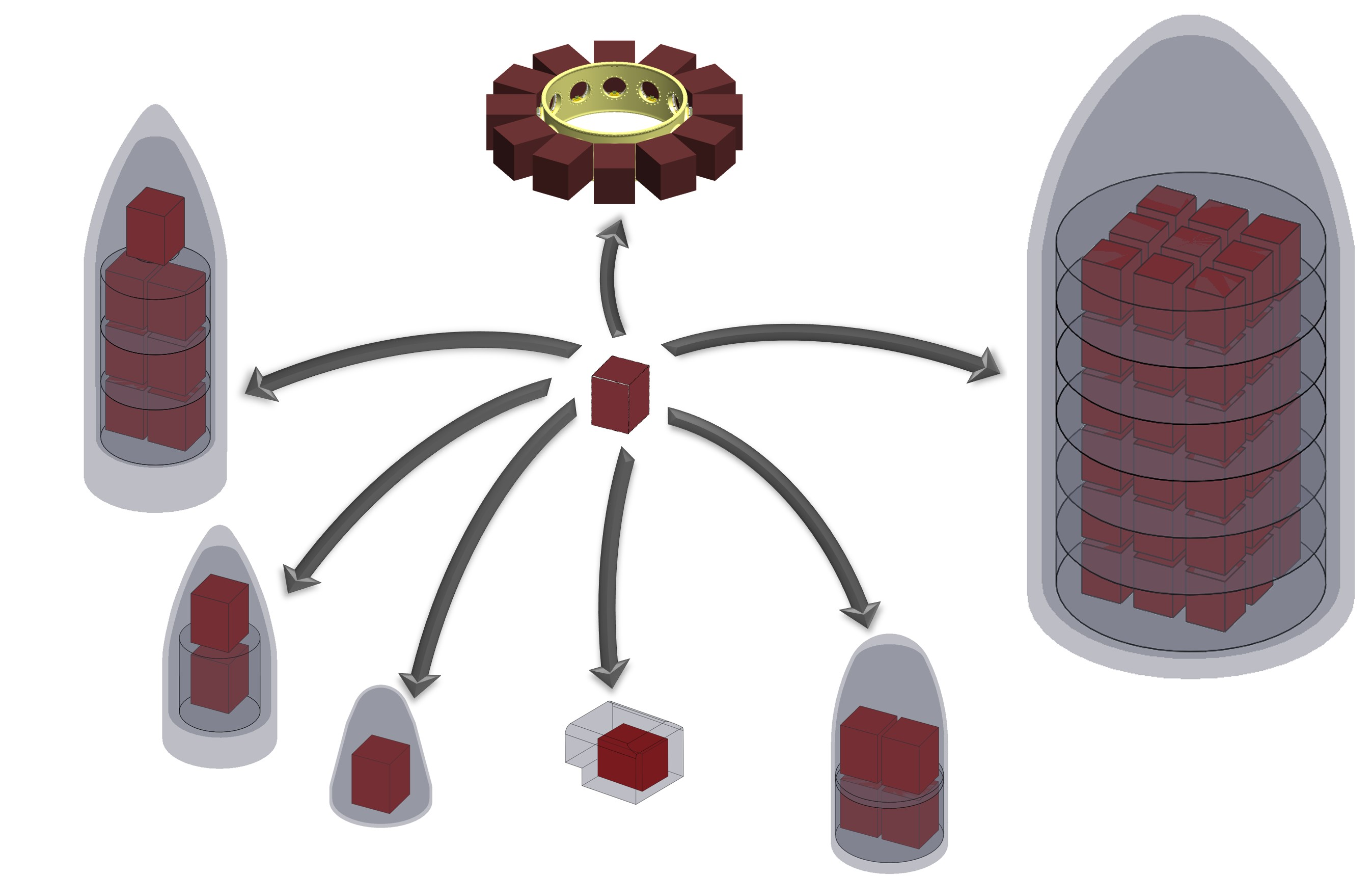
LaunchU volume shown in various launch vehicle fairings or integration hardware.

The LaunchU standard not only defines the volume and mass of the satellite, but the center of gravity, first fundamental frequency, and the launch direction, as those requirements can impact complex analyses on the launch vehicle. All of the requirements for LaunchU (e.g., volume, mass, frequency) include the separation system. Spacecraft that meet the LaunchU standard would be able to integrate with any launch vehicle which was designed for the LaunchU compatible spacecraft.

The standard was proposed by The Aerospace Corporation, at the 32nd Small Satellite Conference, in August 2018.

== See also ==
- CubeSat
- Small satellite
- EELV Secondary Payload Adapter
- Small Satellite Conference
