= Ice cube (disambiguation) =

An ice cube is a chunk of frozen water in the shape of a cube.

Ice Cube is an American rapper, actor and filmmaker.

Ice cube or Ice Cube may also refer to:

== Science ==
- IceCube Neutrino Observatory, an observatory in Antarctica
- IceCube (spacecraft), a satellite
- Lunar IceCube, a NASA nanosatellite mission launched as a secondary payload on Artemis 1.

== Other uses ==
- Ice Cube Curling Center, the curling venue at the 2014 Winter Olympics in Sochi, Russia
- Ice Cubed, Inter-Client Communication Conventions Manual
- Gerald McNeil, an American football player nicknamed "The Ice Cube"
- Beijing National Aquatics Center, the aquatics—turned curling venue is also known as the "Ice Cube", located in Beijing, China
- Ice Cube, a character from the first season of Battle for Dream Island, an animated web series

== See also ==
- Ice (disambiguation)
- ICE 3, high speed train
- Ice III, form of solid water
- Ice Ic, cubic crystalline ice, form of solid water
