= Educational Launch of Nanosatellites =

NASA educational satellite program

Educational Launch of Nanosatellites (ELaNa) is an initiative created by NASA to attract and retain students in the science, technology, engineering and mathematics disciplines. The program is managed by the Launch Services Program (LSP) at NASA's Kennedy Space Center in Florida.

NASA and Firefly Aerospace are planning to launch eight CubeSats as part of NASA’s CubeSat Launch Initiative (CSLI) ELaNa (Educational Launch of Nanosatellites) 43, targeting no earlier than Wednesday, June 26.

Firefly Aerospace’s Alpha rocket, in a mission dubbed “Noise of Summer,” will lift off from Space Launch Complex 2 at Vandenberg Space Force Base in California.

== Overview ==
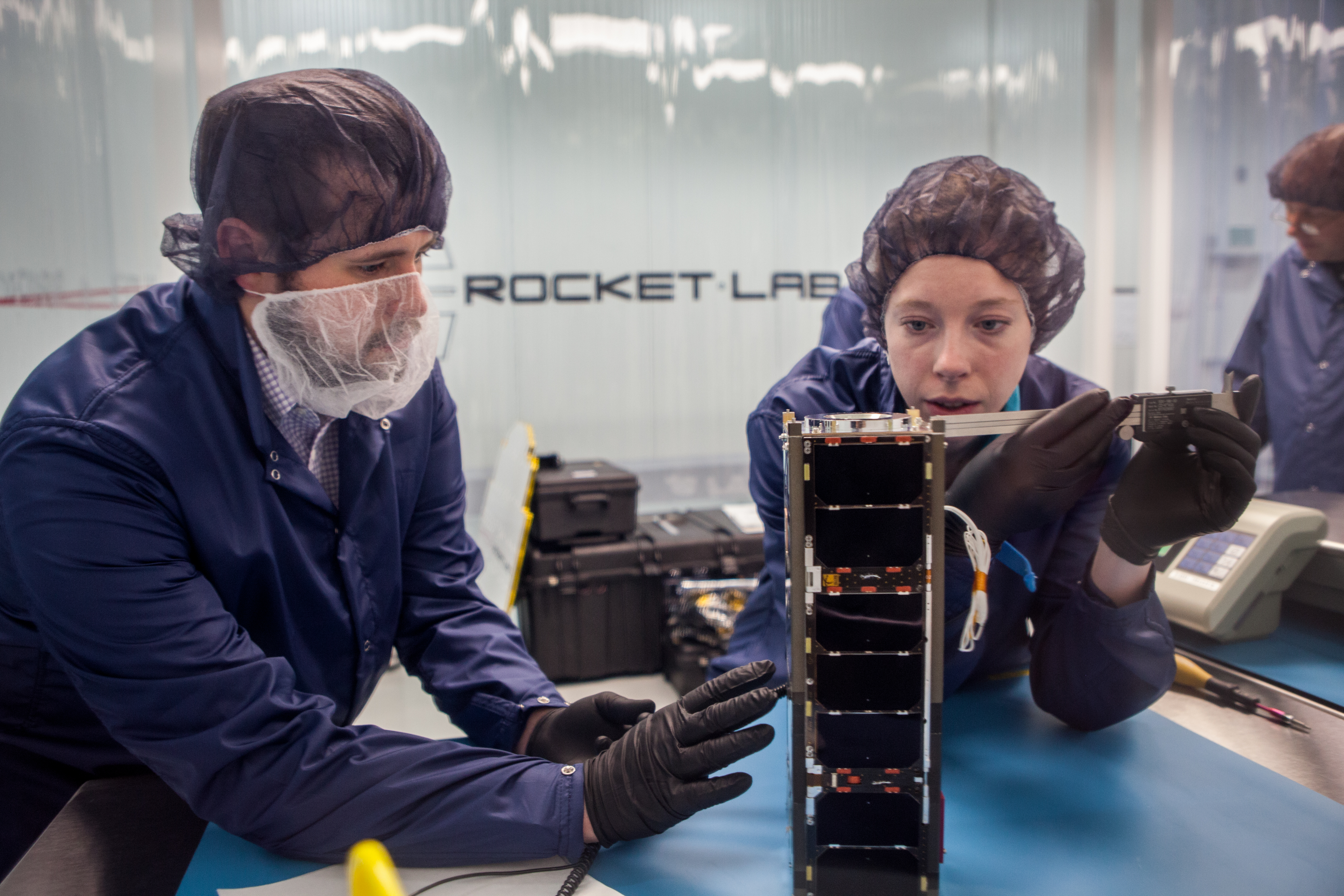
Engineers processing a CubeSat at a facility of Rocket Lab.

The ELaNa initiative has made partnerships with universities in the US to design and launch small research satellites called CubeSats (because of their cube shape). These low-cost CubeSat missions provide NASA with valuable opportunities to test emerging technologies that may be useful in future space missions, while university students get to be involved in all phases of the mission, from instrument and satellite design, to launch and monitoring.

A CubeSat has a cubic shape measuring 10 × 10 × 10 cm (1 unit or 1U), and can be fabricated of multiple cubic units such as 2U, 3U and 6U, and weighing 1.33 kg per unit. Because of the high cost incurred by launching them to orbit, ELaNa's satellites are launched as secondary payload on other missions that have mass and space to spare. Since the launch waiting list has grown considerably, another initiative was launched in 2015 in partnership with the private industry to develop launch vehicles dedicated to CubeSats exclusively. A new company is called Rocket Lab and their launch vehicle is the Electron rocket. This agreement with NASA, enables the company to use NASA resources such as personnel, facilities and equipment for commercial launch efforts. In 2015, NASA contracted two other companies for this purpose: Firefly Space Systems and Virgin Galactic. Nevertheless, NASA CubeSats will continue to hitch rides as secondary payloads in larger rockets whenever possible.

As of August 2017, NASA's ELaNa initiative has selected 151 CubeSat missions, 49 of which have been launched into space.

== Missions ==
ELaNa mission numbers are based on the order they are manifested; due to the nature of launching, the actual launch order differs from the mission numbers.

=== Launched missions ===
Launch date (UTC)	Mission name	CubeSats deployed	Main mission and CubeSats included	Launch vehicle	Launch site
4 March 2011	ELaNa 1	3 *	(Glory) Hermes, Explorer-1 Prime, KySat-1 * launch failure	Taurus XL	VAFB, LC-576
28 October 2011	ELaNa 3	5	(NPOESS Preparatory Project) RAX-2, M-Cubed, Explorer-1 Prime, DICE, AubieSat-1	Delta II 7920-10	VAFB, SLC-2 West
13 September 2012	ELaNa 6	4	(NROL-36); CXBN, CP5, CINEMA, CSSWE	Atlas V 401	VAFB, SLC-3 East
20 November 2013	ELaNa 4	12	(ORS-3) H-2, KySat-2, ChargerSat-1, SwampSat, Trailblazer, TJ3Sat, DragonSat-1, CAPE-2, PhoneSat 2.4, COPPER, DragonSat-1, Vermont Lunar	Minotaur I	MARS, LP-0A
6 December 2013	ELaNa 2	4	(NROL-39); CUNYSAT-1, IPEX, M-Cubed-2, FIREBIRD-1A/1B	Atlas V 501	VAFB, SLC-3 East
22 February 2014	ELaNa 5	5	(SpaceX CRS-3); ALL-STAR, PhoneSat 2.5, KickSat, SporeSat, TSAT	Falcon 9 / Dragon	CCAFS, SLC-40
28 October 2014	ELaNa 8	1 *	Cygnus CRS Orb-3; CHARM * launch failure	Antares 130 / Cygnus	MARS, LP-0A
31 January 2015	ELaNa 10	3	(Soil Moisture Active Passive); GRIFEX, EXOCUBE, FIREBIRD-2 A/B	Delta II 7320	VAFB, SLC-2 West
20 May 2015	ELaNa 11	1	(Boeing X-37#OTV-4); LightSail-A	Atlas V 501	CCAFS, SLC-41
8 October 2015	ELaNa 12	4	(NROL-55); Fox-1, BisonSat, ARC, LMRST-Sat	Atlas V 401	VAFB, SLC-3 East
4 November 2015	ELaNa 7	2 *	(ORS-4); Argus, PrintSat * launch failure	Super Strypi	Pacific Missile Range Facility
6 December 2015	ELaNa 9	3	(Cygnus CRS Orb-4); MinXSS, STMSat-1, CADRE	Atlas V 401 / Cygnus	CCAFS, SLC-41
18 April 2017	ELaNa 17	3	(Cygnus CRS OA-7); CXBN-2, IceCube, CSUNSat-1	Atlas V 401 / Cygnus	CCAFS, SLC-41
14 August 2017	ELaNa 22	3	(SpaceX CRS-12); ASTERIA, Dellingr, OSIRIS-3U	Falcon 9 / Dragon	CCAFS, SLC-40
12 November 2017	ELaNa 13	2	(Cygnus CRS OA-8E); ISARA, EcAMSat	Antares 230	MARS, LP-0A
18 November 2017	ELaNa 14	4	(JPSS-1); MiRaTA, MakerSat-0, RadFxSat, EagleSat-1	Delta II 7920	VAFB, SLC-2 West
21 May 2018	ELaNa 23	9	(Cygnus CRS OA-9E); HaloSat, TEMPEST-D1, EQUiSat, MemSat, CANOP, RadSat, RainCube, SORTIE, CubeRTT	Antares 230 / Cygnus	MARS, LP-0A
15 September 2018	ELaNa 18	5	(ICESat-2); DAVE, ELFIN^{*}, ELFIN, SurfSat	Delta II 7420	VAFB, SLC-2 West
17 November 2018	ELaNa 16	1	(Cygnus CRS OA-10E); KickSat-2	Antares 230 / Cygnus	MARS, LP-0A
3 December 2018	ELaNa 24	2	(SSO-A mission managed by Spaceflight Industries); IRVINE02, WeissSat-1	Falcon 9	VAFB, SLC-4E
5 December 2018	ELaNa 21	2	(SpaceX CRS-16); TechEdSat-8, UNITE	Falcon 9	CCAFS, SLC-40
16 December 2018	ELaNa 19	10	ALBUS; CeREs; CHOMPTT; CubeSail; DaVinci; ISX; NMTSat; RSat-P; Shields-1; STF-1	Electron	Mahia, LC-1A
17 April 2019	ELaNa 26	5	(Cygnus NG-11); CAPSat, HARP, Virginia CubeSat Constellation	Antares 230	MARS, LP-0A
25 June 2019	ELaNa 15	3	(Space Test Program-2); ARMADILLO, LEO (CP9), StangSat	Falcon Heavy	KSC, LC-39A
25 July 2019	ELaNa 27	1	(SpaceX CRS-18); RFTSat	Falcon 9	CCAFS, SLC-40
2 November 2019	ELaNa 25A	7	(Cygnus NG-12); Argus-02, HARP, HuskySat I, Phoenix, RadSat-U, SOCRATES, SwampSat II	Antares 230+	MARS, LP-0A
5 December 2019	ELaNa 25B and ELaNa 28	5	(SpaceX CRS-19); ELaNa 25B: AzTechSat 1, SORTIE, CryoCube 1 ELaNa 28: CIRiS, EdgeCube, MakerSat-1	Falcon 9	CCAFS, SLC-40
14 February 2020	ELaNa 30	1	(Cygnus NG-13); TechEdSat-10 (TES-10)	Antares 230+	MARS, LP-0A
13 June 2020	ELaNa 32	1	ANDESITE	Electron	Mahia, LC-1A
3 October 2020	ELaNa 31	3	(Cygnus NG-14); Bobcat-1, NEUTRON-1, SPOC	Antares 230+	MARS, LP-0A
17 January 2021	ELaNa 20	10	CACTUS-1, CAPE-3, EXOCUBE-2, MiTEE, PICS 1, PICS 2, PolarCube, Q-PACE, RadFXSat-2, TechEdSat-7.	LauncherOne	Cosmic Girl, Mojave
24 January 2021	ELaNa 35	1	(Nanosatellites); PTD-1	Falcon 9	CCAFS
20 February 2021	ELaNa 33	1	(Cygnus NG-15); IT-SPINS	Antares 230+	MARS, LP-0A
3 June 2021	ELaNa 36	1	(SpaceX CRS-22); RamSat	Falcon 9	KSC, LC-39A
29 August 2021	ELaNa 37	3	(SpaceX CRS-23); CAPSat, PR-CuNaR2, SPACE HAUC	Falcon 9	KSC, LC-39A
27 September 2021	ELaNa 34	2	(Landsat 9); CUTE, CuPID	Atlas V 401	CCSFS, SLC-41
21 December 2021	ELaNa 38	4	(SpaceX CRS-24); DAILI, GASPACS, PATCOOL, TARGIT	Falcon 9	KSC, LC-39A
13 January 2022	ELaNa 29	2	(STP-27VP); PAN-A, B	LauncherOne	Cosmic Girl, Mojave
10 February 2022	ELaNa 41	4 *	(VCLS Demo-2A); BAMA-1, INCA, QubeSat, R5-S1 * launch failure	Rocket 3	CCSFS, SLC-46
19 February 2022	ELaNa 44	1	(Cygnus NG-17); NACHOS	Antares 230+	MARS, LP-0A
2 July 2022	ELaNa 39	2	(STP-S28A); GPX2, CTIM-FD	LauncherOne	Cosmic Girl, Mojave
15 July 2022	ELaNa 45	4	(SpaceX CRS-25); BeaverCube, CapSat-1, D3, JAGSAT	Falcon 9	KSC, LC-39A
22 November 2022	ELaNa 49	4	(SpaceX CRS-26); MARIO, petitSat, SPORT, TJREVERB	Falcon 9	KSC, LC-39A
15 March 2023	ELaNa 50	2	(SpaceX CRS-27); ARKSat-1, LightSail	Falcon 9	KSC, LC-39A
15 April 2023	ELaNa 40	2	(Transporter-7); LLITED-A, LLITED-B	Falcon 9	VSFB, SLC-4E
15 April 2023	ELaNa 47	1	(Transporter-7); CIRBE	Falcon 9	VSFB, SLC-4E
4 March 2024	ELaNa 57	1	(Transporter-10); M3	Falcon 9	VSFB, SLC-4E
21 March 2024	ELaNa 51	4	(SpaceX CRS-30); Big Red Sat-1, BurstCube, HyTi, SNoOPI	Falcon 9	CCSFS, SLC-40
4 July 2024	ELaNa 43	8	(VCLS Demo-2FB); CatSat, KUbe-Sat-1, MESAT-1, R5-S2-2.0, R4-S4, Serenity, SOCi, TechEdSat-11	Firefly Alpha	VSFB, SLC-2W
9 July 2024	ELaNa 48	2	(VA262); CURIE A, CURIE B	Ariane 6	Kourou
4 August 2024	ELaNa 52	2	(Cygnus NG-21); CySat-1, DORA	Falcon 9	SLC-40
14 January 2025	ELaNa 54a	1	(Transporter-12); TechEdSat-22	Falcon 9	VSFB, SLC-4E
23 June 2025	ELaNa 56	1	(Transporter-14); ARCSTONE	Falcon 9	VSFB, SLC-4E
23 July 2025	ELaNa 64	1	(TRACERS); REAL	Falcon 9	VSFB, SLC-4E

=== Future missions ===
List of future missions:

Launch date (UTC)	Mission name	No. of CubeSats	Main mission and CubeSats included	Launch vehicle	Launch site
September 2025	ELaNa 58	4	(Cygnus NG-23); BLAST, EagleSat-2, QubeSat-2, RHOK-SAT	Falcon 9	TBA
2025	ELaNa 61	2	(?); TRYAD-1, TRYAD-2	Falcon 9	TBA
2025	ELaNa 53a	1	(?); Dione	TBA	TBA
2025	ELaNa 53b	1	(Transporter-14); SPRITE	Falcon 9	TBA
2025	ELaNa 42	6	(?); AEPEX, DARLA, OrCa2, R5-S3, R5-S5, TechEdSat-16	TBA	TBA
TBA	ELaNa 46	1	(?); TechEdSat-12	TBA	TBA
2025	ELaNa 55	2	(?); CANVAS, INCA-2	TBA	TBA
2025	ELaNa 54b	1	(?); VISORS	TBA	TBA
TBA	ELaNa 59	3	(?); OpenOrbiter 1, R5-S6, SWARM-EX	TBA	TBA
