= Student Nitric Oxide Explorer =

NASA satellite of the Explorer program

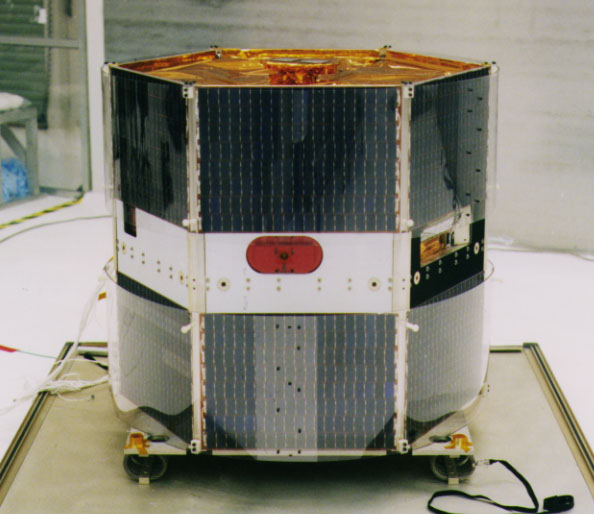
- SNOE satellite
- Names: Explorer 72; STEDI-1; UNEX-1
- Mission type: Space physics
- Operator: Laboratory for Atmospheric and Space Physics
- COSPAR ID: 1998-012A
- SATCAT no.: 25223
- Website: lasp.colorado.edu/home/snoe/
- Mission duration: 5 years, 9 months, 17 days (achieved)

Spacecraft properties
- Spacecraft: Explorer LXXII
- Spacecraft type: Student Nitric Oxide Explorer
- Bus: SNOE
- Manufacturer: University of Colorado Boulder (Laboratory for Atmospheric and Space Physics)
- Launch mass: 120 kg (260 lb)
- Dimensions: 0.9 × 1.0 m (2 ft 11 in × 3 ft 3 in)
- Power: 37 watts

Start of mission
- Launch date: 26 February 1998, 07:07 UTC
- Rocket: Pegasus XL HAPS (F20)
- Launch site: Vandenberg, (Stargazer)
- Contractor: Orbital Sciences Corporation
- Entered service: 11 March 1998

End of mission
- Last contact: 13 December 2003
- Decay date: 13 December 2003, 09:34 UTC

Orbital parameters
- Reference system: Geocentric orbit
- Regime: Sun-synchronous orbit
- Perigee altitude: 535 km (332 mi)
- Apogee altitude: 580 km (360 mi)
- Inclination: 97.70°
- Period: 95.80 minutes

Instruments
- Auroral Photometer (AP); Solar X-ray Photometer (SXP); Ultraviolet Spectrometer (UVS)
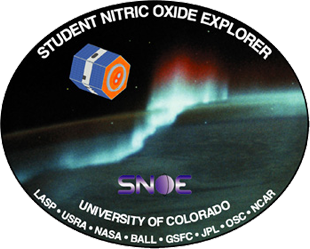
- Student Nitric Oxide Explorer mission patch Explorer program

Student Nitric Oxide Explorer (SNOE ("snowy"), also known as Explorer 72, STEDI-1 and UNEX-1), was a NASA small scientific satellite which studied the concentration of nitric oxide in the thermosphere. It was launched in 1998 as part of NASA's Explorer program. The satellite was the first of three missions developed within the Student Explorer Demonstration Initiative (STEDI) program funded by the NASA and managed by the Universities Space Research Association (USRA). STEDI was a pilot program to demonstrate that high-quality space science can be carried out with small, low-cost (<US$4.4 million) free-flying satellites on a time scale of two years from go-ahead to launch. The satellite was developed by the University of Colorado Boulder's Laboratory for Atmospheric and Space Physics (LASP) and had met its goals by the time its mission ended with reentry in December 2003.

== Overview ==
SNOE was the 72nd mission of the Explorer program by NASA dedicated to the scientific investigation of the space environment of the Earth. SNOE was the first of three projects developed within the university satellite program (STEDI) whose objective is to reach students in the development of satellites with limited means in the context of the strategy of "faster, better, cheaper" promoted by then-NASA administrator Daniel Goldin. The program was funded by NASA and managed by the Universities Space Research Association. The mission, developed by the University of Colorado Boulder in 1994, was selected among 66 proposals to be one of the six pre-selected satellites of the program. In February 1995, the satellite was selected along with TERRIERS of Boston University and CATSAT of the University of Leicester in the United Kingdom. SNOE was built and operated entirely by the Laboratory for Atmospheric and Space Physics of the university.

== Mission ==
The objective of the mission was the detailed study of variations in the concentration of nitrogen monoxide in the thermosphere. Nitric oxide, though a minor component of this region of space, has a significant impact on the composition of ions in the ionosphere and in the heat of the thermosphere. The detailed objectives are:

- Detailing how the variations of X-ray radiation from the sun affects the density of nitric oxide in the lower layer of the thermosphere;
- How auroral activity increases the amount of nitric oxide in the polar regions of Earth.

== Spacecraft ==
SNOE was a compact hexagonal structure, approximately 0.9 m (2 ft 11 in) high and 1 m (3 ft 3 in) across it widest dimension, weighing a maximum of 120 kg (260 lb). It was spin-stabilized at five revolutions per minute, and its axis of rotation was perpendicular to the orbital plane. The exterior of the satellite was covered with solar cells that provide 37 watts.

== Launch ==
It was launched, on 26 February 1998 at 07:07 UTC by an Orbital Sciences Corporation's Stargazer and a Pegasus-XL launch vehicle, into a Sun-synchronous circular orbit, along with the Teledesic T1 satellite, at 535–580 km (332–360 mi) altitude and 97.70° inclination. It span at 5 rpm with the spin axis normal to the orbit plane and carried three instruments: an ultraviolet spectrometer to measure nitric oxide altitude profiles, a two-channel auroral photometer to measure auroral emissions beneath the spacecraft, and a five-channel solar soft X-ray photometer. SNOE also carried a GPS receiver for accurate orbit and attitude determination. The SNOE spacecraft and its instrument complement were designed, built, and operated entirely at the Laboratory for Atmospheric and Space Physics (LASP) of the University of Colorado Boulder. The spacecraft functioned normally until in December 2003.

== Instruments ==
SNOE was equipped with three scientific instruments:

- A two-channel Auroral Photometer, which performs measurements of auroral emissions beneath the satellite;
- A five-channel Solar X-ray Photometer, which measures the soft X-ray emissions by the Sun;
- An Ultraviolet Spectrometer, which performs a vertical profile of the concentration of nitric oxide.

=== Auroral Photometer (AP) ===
The auroral photometer (AP) is a two-channel broad-band instrument that is used to determine the energy deposited in the upper atmosphere by energetic auroral electrons. It is similar to airglow photometers developed by LASP and flown on OGO-5 and OGO-6 in the late 1960s. Each channel consists of a Hamamatsu phototube detectors, a UV filter, and a field of view limiter (circular, 11° full-cone). The combination of a Caesium iodide (CsI) photocathode and a Calcium fluoride (CaF_{2}) filter produces a bandpass from 125 to 180 nm for channel A, allowing a combined measurement of the LBH bands, the OI doublet at 135.6 nm, and the OI triplet at 130.4 nm. For channel B a barium fluoride (BaF_{2}) filter is used producing a 135 to 180 nm bandpass and providing a measurement of the LBH bands and the OI doublet at 135.6 nm with the exclusion of the OI triplet at 130.4 nm. The sensitivity of channel A at 130.4 nm is 23 counts/second/rayleigh and the sensitivity of channel B at 135.6 nm is 26 counts/second/rayleigh. The AP is mounted with its optical axis perpendicular to the spacecraft spin axis. The AP produces continuous data with an integration time of 183 ms, but only the downward-looking part of each spin will be stored.

=== Solar X-ray Photometer (SXP) ===
The solar X-ray photometer (SXP), measures the solar irradiance at wavelengths from 2 to 35 nm. Each of the five photometer channels contains a silicon photodiode; wavelength selection is accomplished by thin metallic films deposited onto the diode surface. Coatings are selected so that overlapping bandpasses can be used to isolate key parts of the spectrum at low resolution: Tin (Sn): 2-8 nm; Titanium (Ti): 2-16 nm; Zirconium/Titanium (Zr/Ti): 5-20 nm; Aluminum/Carbon (Al/C): 15-35 nm. The field of view is 70° full cone. The SXP takes 12 measurements per spin, centered on the zenith, with a 63-second integration time. Thus, it obtains an integrated solar measurement once per orbit, when the Sun is near the zenith.

=== Ultraviolet Spectrometer (UVS) ===
The objective of the ultraviolet spectrometer (UVS) is to measure the density of nitric oxide in the terrestrial upper atmosphere (thermosphere) by observing the (1,0) and (0,1) gamma bands. The UVS design is similar to instruments flown on the Solar Mesosphere Explorer (SME), Pioneer Venus Orbiter, and several launch vehicles. It consists of an Ebert-Fastie spectrometer, an off-axis telescope, and two Hamamatsu phototube detectors. The combination of the spectrometer and the detectors produces a spacing of 22 nm between the two channels and the exit slits are sized to give each detector a 3.7 nm bandpass. The grating in the spectrometer is set to place the (1,0) gamma band (215 nm) on one detector and the (0,1) gamma band (237 nm) on the other detector. Both channels have a sensitivity of 450 counts/second/kilorayleigh. The UVS is mounted with its optical axis perpendicular to the spin axis of the spacecraft. Its telescope images the entrance slit of the spectrometer on the limb with the long axis of the slit parallel to the horizon. The image of the slit on the limb is 3.5 km (2.2 mi) high, which determines the fundamental altitude resolution of the instrument. The integration time is 27 ms.

== Selected science results ==
The limb-scanning Ultraviolet Spectrometer on SNOE observed polar mesospheric clouds, finding that PMCs occur more frequently in the northern latitudes than in the southern, but that they otherwise conform well to the standard model of cloud formation. SNOE also helped to map the effect of global X-rays on the atmosphere.

Enhanced fluxes of solar soft X-rays were detected by SNOE. Solar soft X-ray irradiance was measured by the spacecraft's Solar X-ray Photometer (SXP) between 2- and 20-nm, and covered irradiance levels outside of solar minimum and maximum conditions. In the 2- to 7-nm interval the irradiance levels ranged from 0.3 to 2.5 mW/m^{2}, while in the 6- to 19-nm interval the range was observed to be 0.5 to 3.5 mW/m^{2}. These values were a factor of four times higher than those predicted by the Hinteregger, et al. (1981) empirical model.

== Atmospheric entry ==
SNOE re-entered the atmosphere on 13 December 2003 at 09:34 UTC (± 6 minutes), descending over 2.9° South, 273.8° East, on orbit 32248, after 5 years and 290 days.

== See also ==
- Explorer program
