= Colorado Student Space Weather Experiment =

CSSWE
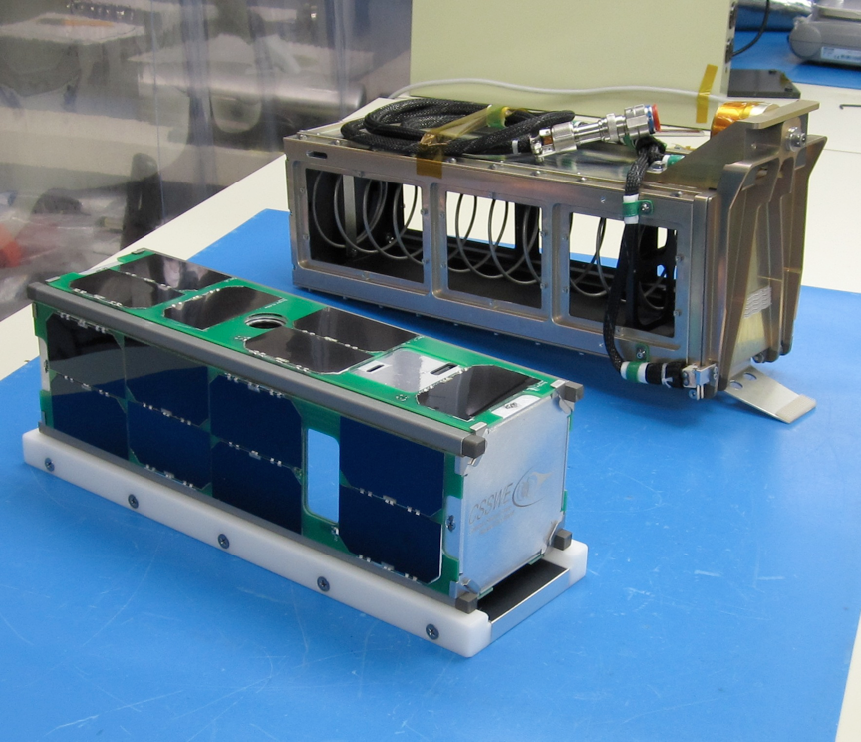
- CSSWE (foreground) and P-POD Deployer prior to integration
- Mission type: Space weather research
- Operator: CU/LASP
- COSPAR ID: 2012-048D
- SATCAT no.: 38761
- Website: lasp.colorado.edu/home/csswe/
- Mission duration: 3 months (planned); 24+ months (achieved)

Spacecraft properties
- Spacecraft type: 3U CubeSat

Start of mission
- Launch date: September 13, 2012, 21:39:00 UTC
- Rocket: Atlas V 401 AV-033
- Launch site: Vandenberg SLC-3E
- Contractor: United Launch Alliance
- Entered service: October 4, 2012

Orbital parameters
- Reference system: Geocentric
- Regime: Low Earth
- Perigee altitude: 472 kilometers (293 mi)
- Apogee altitude: 777 kilometers (483 mi)
- Inclination: 64.6 degrees
- Period: 97.19 minutes
- Epoch: September 14, 2012

Instruments
- REPTile - Relativistic Electron and Proton Telescope integrated little experiment

Colorado Student Space Weather Experiment (CSSWE) was the sixth National Science Foundation sponsored CubeSat mission. It was built by students at the University of Colorado at Boulder with advising from professionals at the Laboratory for Atmospheric and Space Physics. The CSSWE mission was a joint effort by the University of Colorado's Department of Aerospace Engineering Sciences and Laboratory for Atmospheric and Space Physics. The mission principal investigator was Prof. Xinlin Li, and the Co-PIs are Prof. Scott Palo and Dr. Shri Kanekal. The project manager for the project was Dr. Lauren Blum, the system engineer was Dr. David Gerhardt, and the instrument scientist was Dr. Quintin Schiller. It was the predecessor mission to the Colorado Inner Radiation Belt Experiment.

CSSWE launched on September 13, 2012, on an Atlas V rocket by the United Launch Alliance on ELaNa-VI as part of the NASA's CubeSat Launch Initiative (CSLI). The CSSWE team released its science products to the public for download on NASA's Coordinated Data Analysis Web Site (CDAWeb).

As of December 22, 2014, CSSWE showed severe battery degradation, likely due to pushing the battery thousands of cycles beyond the battery's design specs. As a result, CSSWE cannot retain enough power to receive or transmit data.

== Mission Objective ==
CSSWE's mission objective is to study space weather from a near-Earth orbit (480 km x 780 km). Specifically, CSSWE works in conjunction with concurrent missions (such as the Van Allen Probes, BARREL, and SAMPEX) to address the following questions: 1) How does solar flare location, magnitude, and frequency relate to the timing, duration, and energy spectrum of solar energetic particles (SEPs) reaching Earth and 2) How the spectrum and dynamics of Earth's radiation belt electrons evolve.

== Science Instrument ==
CSSWE's science instrument, the Relativistic Electron and Proton Telescope integrated little experiment (REPTile), is the only science instrument aboard and meets the mission objectives. It is a scaled-down version of the Relativistic Electron and Proton Telescope (REPT) instrument, which is part of the Energetic Particle, Composition, and Thermal Plasma (ECT) Instrument Suite on board the Van Allen Probes. REPTile fulfills the mission objectives by measuring electrons from 0.58 to >3.8 Megaelectronvolts (MeV) and protons from 8 to 40 MeV. Also on the CubeSat is an onboard magnetometer to provide knowledge of spacecraft and instrument orientation with respect to Earth's magnetic field.

== Pre-Flight Testing ==
CSSWE underwent the same rigorous testing that all space-based assets at LASP do. In addition to component and subsystem level testing, the spacecraft underwent numerous system level tests. It passed the thermal vacuum chamber test, in which 11 orbital cycles of the spacecraft were simulated in vacuum by increasing and decreasing the spacecraft temperature to reproduce thermal models which predict actual on-orbit temperatures. The first few hours of the mission were reproduced by simulating launch (in which the deployment switch is released, initiating automated commissioning phase) from a mesa nearby the LASP ground station. CSSWE passed this test by completing the initial commissioning phase, deploying its antenna, and establishing contact with the LASP ground station. Orbital attitude tests were performed as well, including Helmholtz cage and error ellipse tests.

== Launch ==
CSSWE was originally scheduled to launch on August 2, 2012 aboard the National Reconnaissance Office Launch-36 (NROL-36). However, the launch was delayed three times to provide additional time for resolution of a range instrumentation issue, according to the United Launch Alliance official statement. The Atlas V 401 eventually launched on September 13, 2012 from Vandenberg AFB Space Launch Complex 3.

The primary payload aboard NROL-36 was a classified NRO payload, so no spacecraft or orbit information was provided. However, there were 11 CubeSats on board the rocket as secondary payloads. The launch vehicle delivered the CubeSats into a 480x780 km orbit with an inclination of 65 degrees. The CubeSats were carried in eight PPOD dispensers attached to the end of the Centaur upper stage via the Aft Bulkhead Carrier, which replaced an unnecessary Helium tank. Four of the CubeSats were launched as part of the NASA's Educational Launch of Nanosatellites (ELaNa) program - CSSWE (University of Colorado - Boulder), CINEMA 1 (University of California - Berkeley et al.), CXBN (Morehead State University), and CP5 (California Polytechnic University). The remaining seven were Aeneas (operated by the University of Southern California), two SMDC-ONE (US Army), STARE-A (Lawrence Livermore National Laboratory), and three AeroCube-4 (Aerospace Corporation).

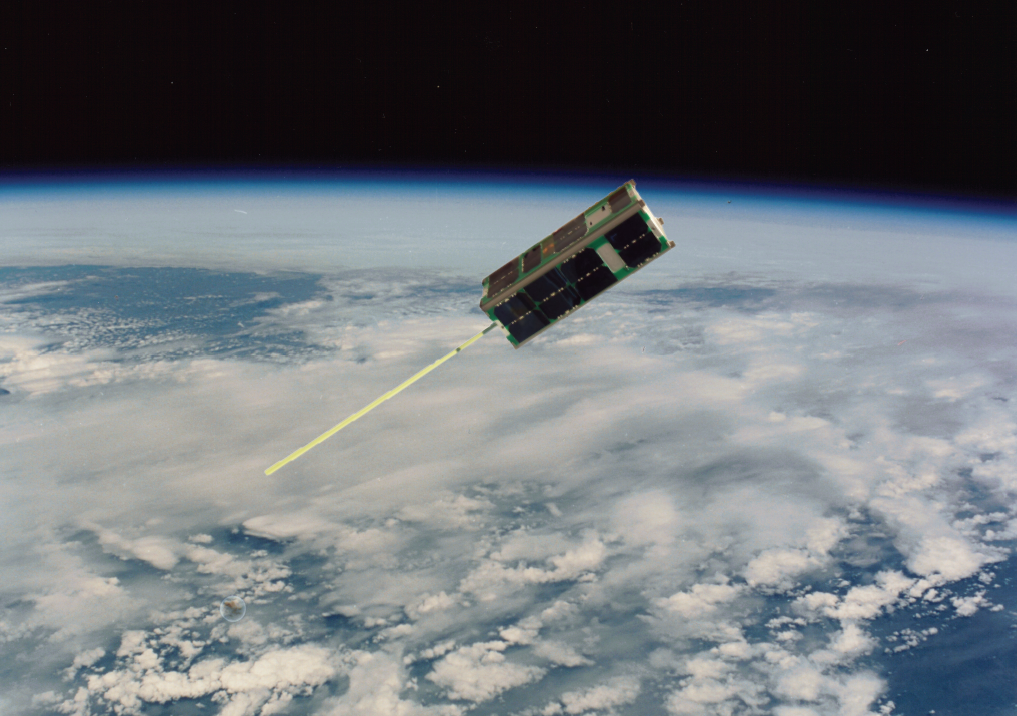
An artistic rendition of how CSSWE would appear on orbit.

== On Orbit Success ==
The spacecraft uses a measuring tape as an antenna to communicate with ground stations. CSSWE was first heard beaconing telemetry packets by amateur radio operator call sign DK3WN almost exactly two hours after deployment from the PPOD, overcoming its first major hurdle. The spacecraft completed science commissioning and was commanded into full science mode 22 days later on October 5. Full mission success occurred on January 5, 2013 after three months of science data. The CSSWE mission ended in December 2014 due to battery degradation.

The first science results and updated science results were presented, respectively, at the 2012 and 2013 Fall American Geophysical Union in San Francisco, CA. and published in peer-reviewed Journals such as Geophysical Review Letters, the Journal of Geophysical Research, and Science. CSSWE now has 24 associated peer-reviewed scientific or engineering journal publications, including a paper published in Nature on 13 December 2017.
