= Ice cloud =

Atmospheric phenomenon

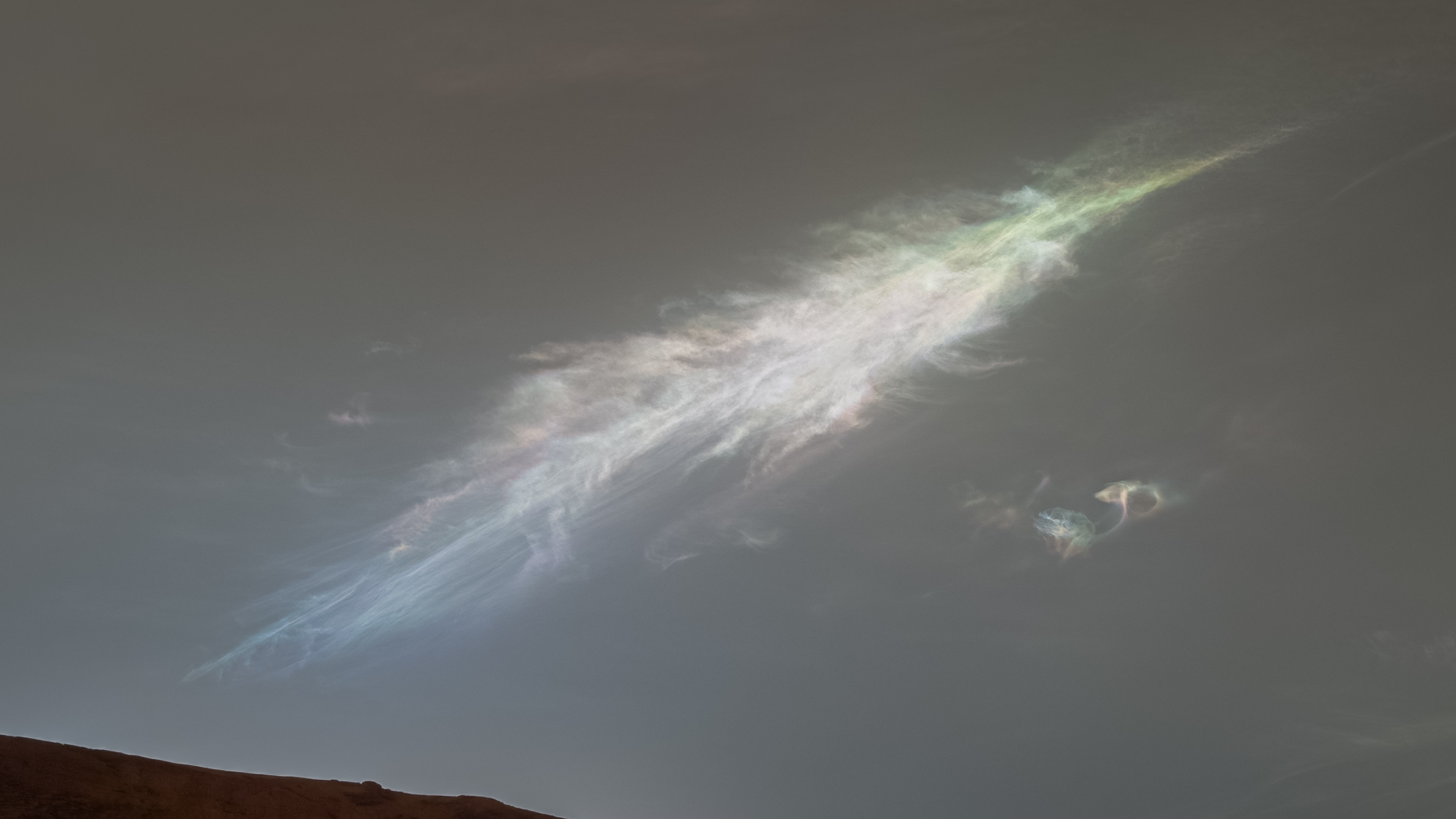
A iridescent cloud cover Gale crater on Mars. Ice particles infused the cloud and caused this effect through diffraction.

An ice cloud is a colloid of ice particles dispersed in air. Cirrus and noctilucent clouds on Earth contain ice particles. On Earth, ice clouds are distributed globally, covering around 50% of the planet's surface. The term has been used to refer to clouds of both water ice and carbon dioxide ice on Mars. Such clouds can be sufficiently large and dense to cast shadows on the Martian surface.

Around the tropics at altitudes of 5 to 15 kilometers, the most frequently observed ice clouds are optically thin. Thicker ice clouds occur frequently in tropical convective areas and along storm tracks at midlatitudes.

== Effects ==
Ice clouds play a crucial role in a variety of processes such as the heat balance of Earth and global water cycle.

=== Heat regulation ===
Ice clouds play a crucial role in Earth's radiation balance. They can cool the atmosphere by reflecting solar radiation back to space and warm it up by blocking outgoing thermal radiation. Their effects on the climate vary significantly depending on their location; they cause heating when in the upper troposphere of the tropics, and cause strong cooling in lower altitudes.

=== Water cycle ===
They also play a crucial role in the global water cycle, being involved in processes such as latent heat release, precipitation and radiative forcing.

== Study ==
Despite their crucial importance to the energy balance of Earth, ice clouds remain poorly studied. This is partly due to the complexities and variety of factors that influence them, such as temperature, humidity, and vertical wind. Several models have been made to accurately calculate the properties of ice clouds. Some nanosatellites, such as IceCube, study the global atmospheric ice content and its effects on Earth's climate. Other satellites, such as CloudSat and the CALIPSO, are used to study ice clouds.
