= Colorado Inner Radiation Belt Experiment =

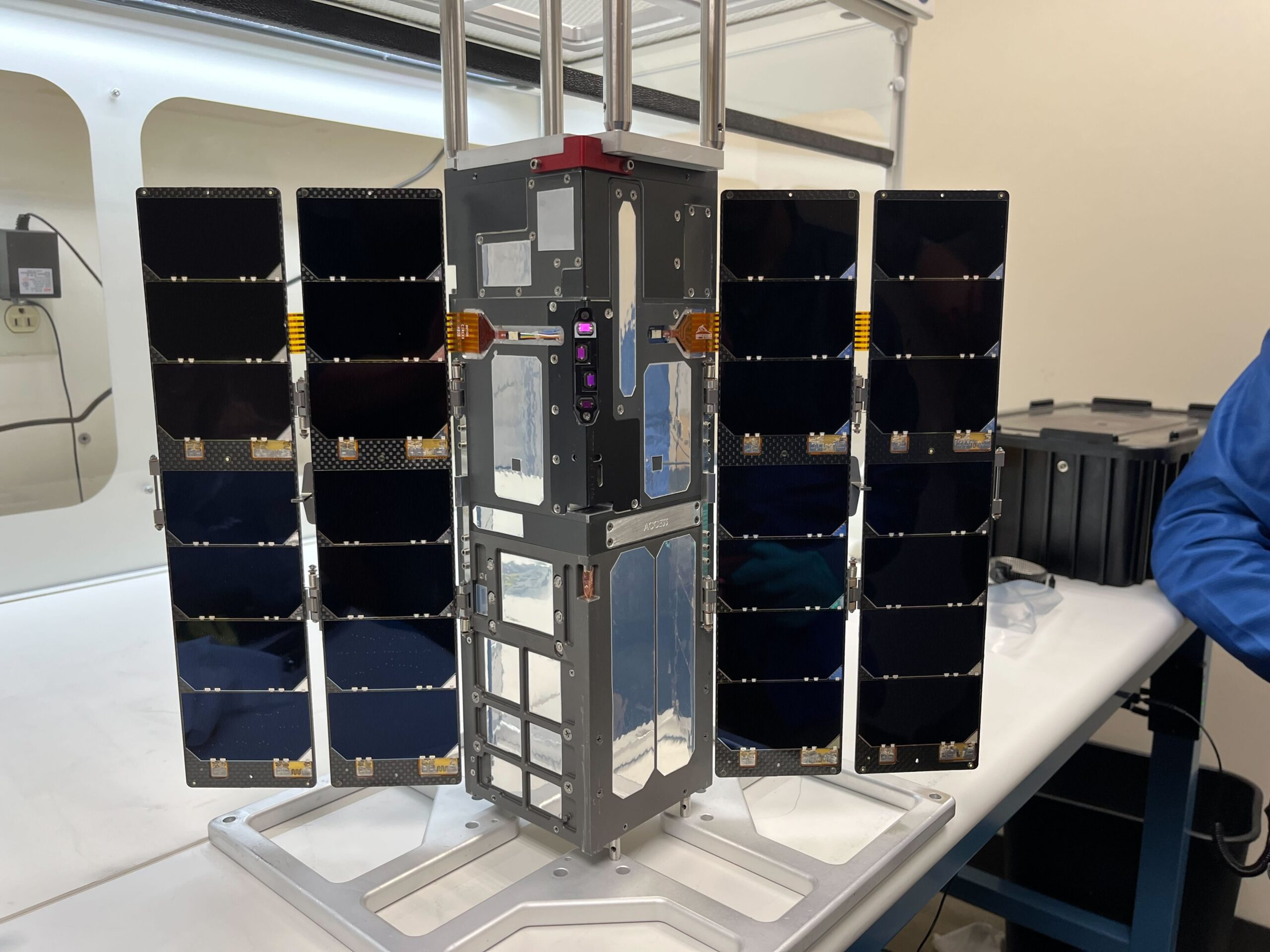
- CIRBE with deployed solar panels
- Mission type: Space physics and space weather research
- Operator: LASP; Principal Investigator: Xinlin Li; Co-Investigators: Richard Selesnick, Rick Kohnert, Scott Palo
- COSPAR ID: 2023-054L
- SATCAT no.: 56188
- Website: lasp.colorado.edu/cirbe/
- Mission duration: 6 months (planned); 1 year, 5 months, 20 days (achieved)

Spacecraft properties
- Spacecraft type: 3U Cubesat
- Bus: BCT XB1
- Manufacturer: Bus: Blue Canyon Technologies; Science Instrument: LASP
- Launch mass: 5.5 kg
- Dimensions: 10 cm x 10 cm x 34 cm

Start of mission
- Launch date: April 15, 2023, 06:48:00 UTC
- Rocket: Falcon 9 Transporter-7
- Launch site: Vandenberg SLC-4E
- Contractor: SpaceX
- Entered service: April 19, 2023

End of mission
- Declared: Reentry: October 4, 2024

Orbital parameters
- Reference system: Geocentric
- Regime: Low earth, sun-synchronous
- Altitude: 509 km (initial)
- Inclination: 97.4 degrees

Instruments
- REPTile-2 - Relativistic Electron and Proton integrated little experiment-2

The Colorado Inner Radiation Belt Experiment (CIRBE) was a NASA sponsored CubeSat mission. The mission's science instrument REPTile-2 was designed and built by scientists, engineers, and students at the Laboratory for Atmospheric and Space Physics (LASP). The CIRBE mission was a joint effort by LASP and the Department of Aerospace Engineering Sciences at the University of Colorado Boulder. The mission principal investigator was Professor Xinlin Li with co-investigators Richard Selesnick, Rick Kohnert, and Scott Palo. It was the successor mission to the Colorado Student Space Weather Experiment.

CIRBE launched on April 15, 2023, on a Falcon 9 rocket by SpaceX on Transporter-7 as part of NASA's CubeSat Launch Initiative (CSLI). The spacecraft began operations on April 19, 2023, and remained operational (except for a two-month period from April to June 2023) until it reentered on October 4, 2024. The CIRBE team has publicly released data products on the mission's website.

== Mission objective ==
CIRBE's primary mission objective was to study the formation and decay of inner radiation belt electrons and to determine the intensity and dynamic variations of these particles. Specifically, the CIRBE team outlined three science questions they wished to address with the mission: 1) Where is the break point in terms of energy of electrons for a given event, below which electrons can be transported into the inner belt from the outer belt but above which electrons cannot, and what is the injection mechanism? 2) What is the CRAND (cosmic ray albedo neutron decay) contribution to inner belt electrons, and what is the low energy neutron density near Earth? 3) What is the role of wave-particle interactions in shaping inner-belt electron energy spectra?

== Science instrument ==
CIRBE's only science instrument is the Relativistic Electron and Proton Telescope integrated little experiment-2 (REPTile-2). It is a scaled-down and updated version of the Relativistic Electron and Proton Telescope (REPT) instrument which is part of the Energetic Particle, Composition, and Thermal Plasma (ECT) Instrument Suite on board the Van Allen Probes. REPTile-2 fulfills the mission objectives with its extremely high energy resolution, measuring electrons from 0.3 to 5.8 Megaelectronvolts (MeV) and protons from 6.8 to ≥40 MeV with a total of 120 energy channels. It uses a series of four silicon particle detectors which were obtained from Micron Semiconductor Ltd. to measure these particles, and uses a system of logic based on how much energy was deposited on each detector to distinguish different types of particles from each other. REPTile-2 was designed and built at LASP and was approximately the size of 1.5 CubeSat units (10 cm × 10 cm × 15 cm).

== Spacecraft assembly and pre-launch ==
The CIRBE satellite bus was an XB1 obtained from Blue Canyon Technologies. The REPTile-2 instrument was integrated into the XB1 bus at LASP and the final assembly and preparation for launch for CIRBE was performed there. When fully assembled, CIRBE was approximately the size of 3 CubeSat units (10 cm × 10 cm × 34 cm). CIRBE underwent rigorous pre-launch testing at LASP including electronic noise tests, thermal vacuum tests, and vibration tests. After pre-launch tests were completed, CIRBE was integrated into a satellite dispenser at Maverick Space Systems on February 24, 2023, in preparation for launch.

== Launch ==
CIRBE was selected for launch through NASA's CubeSat Launch Initiative (CLSI). The CSLI program pairs CubeSats with launches where the CubeSat(s) fly as auxiliary payloads on the primary launch mission. When a CubeSat is paired with a launch, the launch is assigned an Educational Launch of Nanosatellites (ELaNa) mission number. CIRBE was paired with SpaceX's Transporter-7 mission, which was given the designation ELaNa 47.

Transporter-7 was a part of SpaceX's Transporter mission series, which is SpaceX's dedicated smallsat rideshare program. Transporter-7 had 51 spacecraft onboard including CIRBE, fellow ELaNa CubeSat the Low-Latitude Ionosphere/Thermosphere Enhancements in Density (LLITED) which was given the designation ELaNa 40, and a variety of other small satellites serving scientific and commercial purposes.

After a four day delay to allow for additional pre-launch checks and improved weather conditions, the Transporter-7 mission launched from Space Launch Complex 4E (SLC-4E) at Vandenberg Space Force Base at 6:48:00 (UTC) on April 15, 2023 on a Falcon 9 rocket. Approximately seven and a half minutes after launch, the launch vehicle's booster landed at SpaceX's landing zone four.

== Mission overview ==
After launch at 6:48:00 (UTC) on April 15, 2023, CIRBE was deployed at T+01:06:20, when communications were soon established and the spacecraft was found to be in a healthy state. The first science data was collected by REPTile-2 on April 19. REPTile-2 observed the geomagnetic storm that occurred on April 23 and 24 which had a minimum disturbance storm time index (Dst) of -233 nanoteslas (nT), the (at the time) largest storm since March 2015. On March 23, 2024, REPTile-2 observed the (at the time) largest solar energetic particle event (SEP) since September 2017.

After regular contact was made on April 15, 2024, contact was unable to be made with CIRBE until it was briefly reestablished from May 13 through 15, before being lost again until June 10. No science data was recovered during this "blackout" period, and normal data collection did not resume until June 16, a gap of 62 days. During the "blackout" period, from May 10 to 13, the largest geomagnetic storm since November 2003 occurred. REPTile-2 was unable to directly observe the event, but through comparison of the data collected before and after the storm, the CIRBE team identified a new proton and electron belt that was created by the storm.

REPTile-2's latest science data that was able to be downloaded was collected on September 28, 2024. CIRBE's orbit decayed and the spacecraft reentered the atmosphere on October 4, ending the mission.
