= Laboratory for Atmospheric and Space Physics =

Research organization at the University of Colorado Boulder

Coordinates: 40.00865°N 105.24746°W

Laboratory for Atmospheric and Space Physics (LASP)

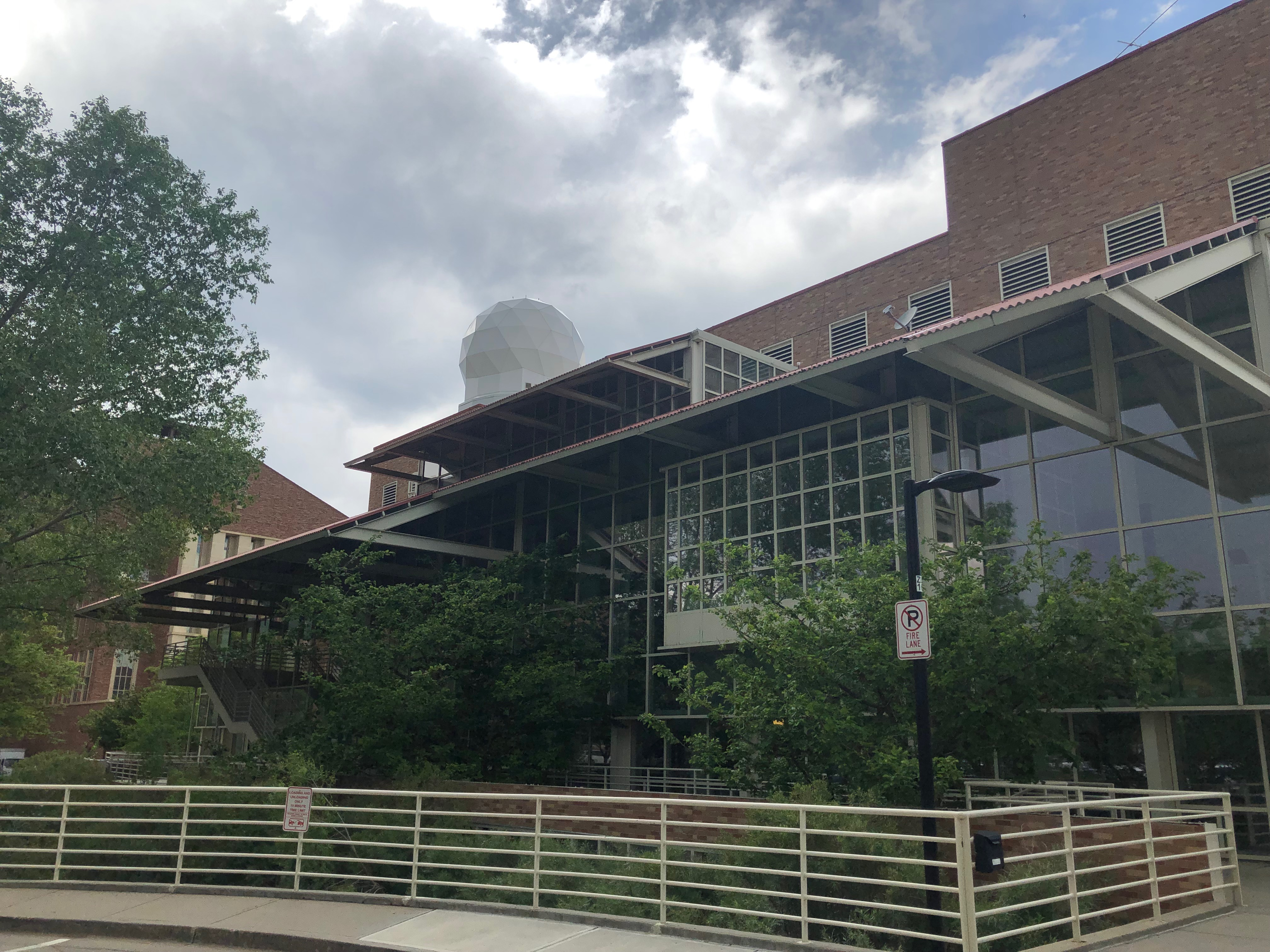
- The LASP Space Technology Research Center (LSTR)
- Established: April 1, 1948; 78 years ago
- Research type: Research
- Budget: $200 million (2025)
- Field of research: Astrophysics; Planetary science; Space science; Geophysics; Plasma physics; Space weather
- Director: Bethany Ehlmann
- Staff: 750
- Location: 3665 Discovery Drive, Boulder, Colorado, U.S.
- Campus: 600 acres (2.4 km^{2})
- Affiliations: CU Boulder; NASA
- Nobel laureates: Thomas Cech (1989); Carl Wieman (2001); Eric Cornell (2001); John L. Hall (2005); David Wineland (2012)
- Website: lasp.colorado.edu

The Laboratory for Atmospheric and Space Physics (LASP) is a research institute at the University of Colorado, Boulder. Founded in 1948, LASP employs 750+ scientists, engineers, and students dedicated to space science research in fields including solar physics, planetary atmospheres, dusty plasmas, geophysics, and space weather. The institute received over $1 billion in research revenue since 2013, predominantly from NASA contracts. LASP employs over 250 students and is the only academic institute to send spacecraft instruments to all 8 planets in the Solar System. LASP has also sent missions to Pluto, the Sun, and multiple planetary moons.

As of 2025, LASP has a yearly budget exceeding $200 million and manages or supports 26 active space missions.

== History ==
Founded in 1948 as the Upper Air Laboratory, the first scientific instruments built at LASP were launched into space after World War II using captured German V-2 rockets. In 1963, the University of Colorado received $791,500 from NASA for the construction of a 25,000 square-foot building to study "ultraviolet physics, solar ultraviolet-radiation data from rockets, and the testing of solar-rocket pointing-control mechanisms". LASP maintains a suborbital rocket program through periodic calibration instrument flights from White Sands Missile Range. It changed to its current name in 1965. LASP has historical ties to Ball Aerospace Corporation and the Center for Astrophysics and Space Astronomy (CASA).

The University of Colorado receives more NASA funding than any public university in the country, due in large part to LASP programs. Multiple companies have spun-off from research at LASP, including on electron beam dust mitigation for NASA.

== Facilities ==
LASP has two main facilities located in the University of Colorado Boulder Research Park: the LASP Space Technology Research Center (LSTR) and Space Science (SPSC). Two additional facilities - Astrophysical Research Lab (ARL) and Space Learning Lab (SLL/NPL) - are also part of LASP.

The facilities allow LASP to execute almost every aspect of space missions. Hardware facilities and cleanrooms allow for the construction of single instruments or entire spacecraft. A Mission Operations Center allows for the control of spacecraft data collection, and a large research staff analyzes the data for science research.

As part of the university, LASP has heavy student involvement in every aspect of its operations, including science, hardware design, spacecraft integration, and mission operations. Graduate students regularly lead instrument development under the supervision of professors and scientists at the institute. Notable student-led instruments include the Venetia Burney Student Dust Counter on New Horizons and the Student Nitric Oxide Explorer (SNOE) as part of NASA's Explorers Program.

== List of missions ==
| Launch | End of Mission | Instrument(s)/Experiment(s) | Mission | Status |
|---|---|---|---|---|
| 1967 | 1967 | Ultraviolet Photometer (UVP) | Mariner 5 | Complete |
| 1969 | 1970 | Ultraviolet Spectrometer (UVS) | Mariner 6 and 7 | Complete |
| 1969 | 1975 | High-Resolution Ultraviolet Spectrometer (HR UVS); Solar Extreme Ultraviolet Monitor (SEUVM) | OSO-5 | Complete |
| 1971 | 1972 | Ultraviolet Spectrometer (UVS) | Mariner 9 | Complete |
| 1973 | 1978 | Ultraviolet Nitric-Oxide Experiment (UVNO) | Explorer 51 | Complete |
| 1975 | 1976 | Ultraviolet Nitric-Oxide Experiment (UVNO) | Explorer 54 | Complete |
| 1975 | 1978 | High-Resolution Ultraviolet Spectrometer (HR UVS); Solar Extreme Ultraviolet Monitor (SEUVM) | OSO-8 | Complete |
| 1977 | — | Photopolarimeter | Voyager 1 | Active |
| 1977 | — | Photopolarimeter | Voyager 2 | Active |
| 1978 | 1992 | Ultraviolet Spectrometer (UVS) | Pioneer Venus Orbiter | Complete |
| 1981 | 1989 | Mission operations | Solar Mesosphere Explorer | Complete |
| 1986 | 1986 | Ultraviolet Spectrometer (UVS) | STS-51-L; lost in the Space Shuttle Challenger disaster | Lost |
| 1989 | 2003 | Extreme Ultraviolet Spectrometer (EUV); Ultraviolet Spectrometer (UVS) | Galileo | Complete |
| 1991 | 2005 | Solar Stellar Irradiance Comparison Experiment (SOLSTICE) | Upper Atmosphere Research Satellite | Complete |
| 1996 | 1996 | High-Resolution Mapping Spectrometer (SVET) | Mars 96 | Lost |
| 1996 | 1996 | Mechanics of Granular Materials (MGM-I) microgravity experiment | STS-79 | Complete |
| 1996 | 2008 | Toroidal Imaging Mass-Angle Spectrograph (TIMAS) | Polar (satellite) | Complete |
| 1997 | 2017 | Imaging Ultraviolet Spectrograph (IUVS) | Cassini-Huygens | Complete |
| 1998 | 1998 | Impactor Box Systems (COLLIDE) | STS-90 | Complete |
| 1998 | 1998 | Mechanics of Granular Materials (MGM-II) microgravity experiment | STS-89 | Complete |
| 1998 | 2003 | Solar X-ray Photometer (SXP); Auroral Photometer (AP); Ultraviolet Spectrometer (UVS) | Student Nitric Oxide Explorer | Complete |
| 1999 | 2018 | Mission operations | QuikSCAT | Complete |
| 2001 | 2001 | Impactor Box Systems (COLLIDE-2) | STS-108 | Complete |
| 2001 | — | Solar EUV Experiment (SEE) | TIMED (Johns Hopkins APL) | Active |
| 2003 | 2010 | Mission operations | ICESat | Complete |
| 2003 | 2003 | Mechanics of Granular Materials (MGM-III) microgravity experiment | STS-107; lost in the Space Shuttle Columbia disaster | Lost |
| 2003 | 2020 | X-ray Ultraviolet Photometer System (XPS); Solar Stellar Irradiance Comparison Experiment (SOLSTICE); Spectral Irradiance Monitor (SIM); Total Irradiance Monitor (TIM); Mission operations | SORCE | Complete |
| 2004 | 2015 | Mercury Atmospheric and Surface Composition Spectrometer (MASCS) | MESSENGER | Complete |
| 2006 | — | Venetia Burney Student Dust Counter (VBSDC) | New Horizons | Active |
| 2007 | 2024 | Cosmic Dust Experiment (CDE); Cloud Imaging and Particle Size Experiment (CIPS) | Explorer 90 | Complete |
| 2007 | — | Digital Fields Board (DFB) | THEMIS | Active |
| 2009 | 2018 | Mission operations | Kepler Space Telescope | Complete |
| 2010 | — | Extreme Ultraviolet Variability Experiment (EVE) | Solar Dynamics Observatory; NASA Sounding Rocket Program | Active |
| 2011 | 2011 | Total Irradiance Monitor (TIM) | Glory | Lost |
| 2012 | 2014 | Relativistic Electron and Proton Telescope integrated little experiment (REPTile) | CSSWE (3U SmallSat) | Complete |
| 2012 | 2019 | Relativistic Electron Proton Telescope (REPT); Digital Fields Board (DFB) | Van Allen Probes | Complete |
| 2013 | 2014 | HyperSpectral Imager for Climate Science (HySICS) | NASA high-altitude balloons | Complete |
| 2013 | 2014 | Lunar Dust Experiment (LDEX) | LADEE | Complete |
| 2013 | 2019 | Total Solar Irradiance Calibration Transfer Experiment (TCTE) | STPSat-3 | Complete |
| 2013 | — | Imaging Ultraviolet Spectrograph (IUVS); Extreme Ultraviolet Monitor (EUVM); Langmuir Probe (LPW) | MAVEN | Active |
| 2015 | — | Mission operations | Magnetospheric Multiscale Mission | Active |
| 2016 | — | Extreme ultraviolet and X-ray Irradiance Sensors (EXIS) | GOES-16 | Active |
| 2017 | — | Spectral Irradiance Monitor (SIM); Total Irradiance Monitor (TIM) | TSIS-1 on the International Space Station | Active |
| 2018 | — | Global-scale Observations of the Limb and Disk Instrument | GOLD | Active |
| 2018 | — | Extreme ultraviolet and X-ray Irradiance Sensors (EXIS) | GOES-17 | Active |
| 2018 | — | Digital Fields Board (DFB) | Parker Solar Probe | Active |
| 2018 | 2022 | Compact Spectral Irradiance Monitor (CSIM) | 6U SmallSat | Complete |
| 2020 | — | Emirates Mars Ultraviolet Spectrometer (EMUS); Emirates Exploration Imager (EXI) | Emirates Mars Mission | Active |
| 2020 | — | Reeldown Aerosol Cloud Humidity and Temperature Sensor (RACHuTS); Fiberoptic Laser Operated Temperature Sensor (FLOATS); LASP Particle Counter (LPC) | Strateole-2 (20 CNES high-altitude balloons) | Active |
| 2021 | — | Near-ultraviolet (NUV) transmission spectrometer | Colorado Ultraviolet Transit Experiment | Active |
| 2021 | — | Mission operations | IXPE | Active |
| 2022 | — | Dual-channel Extreme Ultraviolet Continuum Experiment (DEUCE) | NASA Sounding Rocket Program | Active |
| 2022 | — | Dual Aperture X-Ray Solar Spectrometer (DAXSS) | INSPIRESat-1 | Active |
| 2022 | — | Extreme ultraviolet and X-ray Irradiance Sensors (EXIS) | GOES-18 | Active |
| 2022 | — | Suborbital Imaging Spectrograph for Transition region Irradiance from Nearby Exoplanet (SISTINE) | NASA Sounding Rocket Program | Active |
| 2022 | — | Compact Total Irradiance Monitor (CTIM) | 6U SmallSat | Active |
| 2023 | — | Occultation Wave Limb Sounder (OWLS) | INSPIRESat-3 | Active |
| 2023 | — | Relativistic Electron and Proton Telescope integrated little experiment (REPTile) | Colorado Inner Radiation Belt Experiment | Active |
| 2024 | — | Extreme ultraviolet and X-ray Irradiance Sensors (EXIS) | GOES-19 | Active |
| 2024 | — | Surface Dust Analyzer (SUDA) | Europa Clipper | Active |
| 2025 | — | Interstellar Dust Experiment (IDEX) | Interstellar Mapping and Acceleration Probe (IMAP) | Active |
| 2026 | — | Ultraviolet telescope | Supernova remnants and Proxies for ReIonization Testbed Experiment (SPRITE) (12U SmallSat) | Planned |
| 2026 | — | Dual Solar Position Sensor (SPS) | Sun Coronal Ejection Tracker (SunCET) (6U SmallSat, Johns Hopkins APL) | Planned |
| 2026 | — | Acute Precipitating Electron Spectrometer (APES); Proton eLectron Advanced Sensor for M-I Coupling (PLASMIC); Ionization Gauge (IG); Cross Track Wind Sensor (CTWS); Rapid Active Plasma Sounder (RAPS) | COUSIN Sounding Rocket | Planned |
| 2026 | — | 3-axis search coil antenna; 2-axis dipole antenna | Climatology of Anthropogenic and Natural VLF wave Activity in Space (CANVAS) | Planned |
| 2026 | — | AXIS (Atmospheric X-ray Imaging Spectrometer) | Atmosphere Effects of Precipitation through Energetic X-rays (AEPEX) (6U SmallSat) | Planned |
| 2026 | — | Far ultraviolet integral field spectrograph (IFS) | Integral Field Ultraviolet Spectroscopic Experiment (INFUSE) Sounding Rocket | Planned |
| 2026 | — | Chromosphere spectrograph | Solar eruptioN Integral Field Spectrograph (SNIFS) Sounding Rocket | Planned |
| 2026 | — | Lunar Surface Electromagnetics Experiment (LuSEE) | Artemis II | Planned |
| 2027 | — | Total Irradiance Monitor (TIM); Spectral Irradiance Monitor (SIM) | Total and Spectral Solar Irradiance Sensor–2 (TSIS-2) (SmallSat) | Planned |

== See also ==
- National Center for Atmospheric Research (NCAR)
- IDL (programming language)
- NASA Explorers Program
- Space Sciences Laboratory
- Jet Propulsion Laboratory
