= CXBN =

Nanosatellite

Cosmic X-ray Background Nanosatellite
- Mission type: X-ray astronomy
- Operator: MSU
- COSPAR ID: 2012-048E
- SATCAT no.: 38762

Spacecraft properties
- Spacecraft: CXBN
- Spacecraft type: 2U CubeSat
- Manufacturer: MSU
- Dry mass: 2.6kg
- Dimensions: 10 x 10 x 20cm
- Power: 15W

Start of mission
- Launch date: September 13, 2012
- Rocket: Atlas V 401
- Launch site: VAFB Launch Complex 3
- Contractor: United Launch Alliance
- Deployed from: Poly-Picosatellite Orbital Deployer

End of mission
- Disposal: Re-entry
- Last contact: January 2013

Orbital parameters
- Reference system: Geocentric
- Regime: Low Earth
- Periapsis altitude: 460 kilometres (290 mi)
- Apoapsis altitude: 770 kilometres (480 mi)
- Inclination: 64°

Instruments
- Cadmium Zinc Telluride (CZT) array

Cosmic X-ray Background Nanosatellite (CXBN) was a satellite and mission developed by Morehead State University. Unlike its successor, it was a partial failure as its transmissions were too weak for its mission due to it going into an anomalous low power mode. It was supposed to take measurements of the cosmic X-ray background in the 30–50 keV range and temporarily supplement NASA's Radiation Belt Storm Probes.

== Objectives ==
CXBN was created as a low-cost CubeSat platform to observe the extragalactic cosmic X-ray background and take improved measurements. It had a new gamma ray detector system with its CZT array, which would have potentially provided insight into the early universe's physics.

== Design ==
The CXBN CubeSat occupied a volume of 10 × 10 × 20 cm (3.9 × 3.9 × 7.9 in) when in its compact form. It had four deployable solar panels. Morehead State University (MSU) engineered its subsystems, while the CZT detector was designed by the University of California at Berkeley and Lawrence Livermore National Laboratory. It also contained Sun sensors for its spin stabilization.

== Instruments ==
CXBN contained a Cadmium Zinc Telluride array to allow for the mapping of the cosmic X-ray background.

== Launch and mission ==
CXBN was launched on September 13, 2012 along with several other nanosatellites as part of NASA's Educational Launch of Nanosatellites program on an Atlas V 401 rocket. It was also the 35th launch of the NROL program with a main satellite payload for the National Reconnaissance Office.

MSU provided support for ground operations with its 21m Space Tracking Antenna.

CXBN decayed from orbit and re-entered the atmosphere in January 2013. It did not complete its science mission due to an anomaly causing it to go to low power mode. The signal-to-noise ratio was too low, preventing the ground station from collecting enough data.

== Notes ==
- Brown, Kevin; Rose, Tyler; Malphrus, Benjamin; Kruth, Jeffrey; Thomas, Eric; Combs, Michael; McNeil, Roger; Kroll, Robert; Cahall, Benjamin; Burba, Tyler; Molton, Brandon (2012-08-15). "The Cosmic X-Ray Background NanoSat (CXBN): Measuring the Cosmic X-Ray Background using the CubeSat Form Factor". Utah State University – via DigitalCommons@USU.
