= NASA Sounding Rocket Program =

Aerospace measurement program of NASA

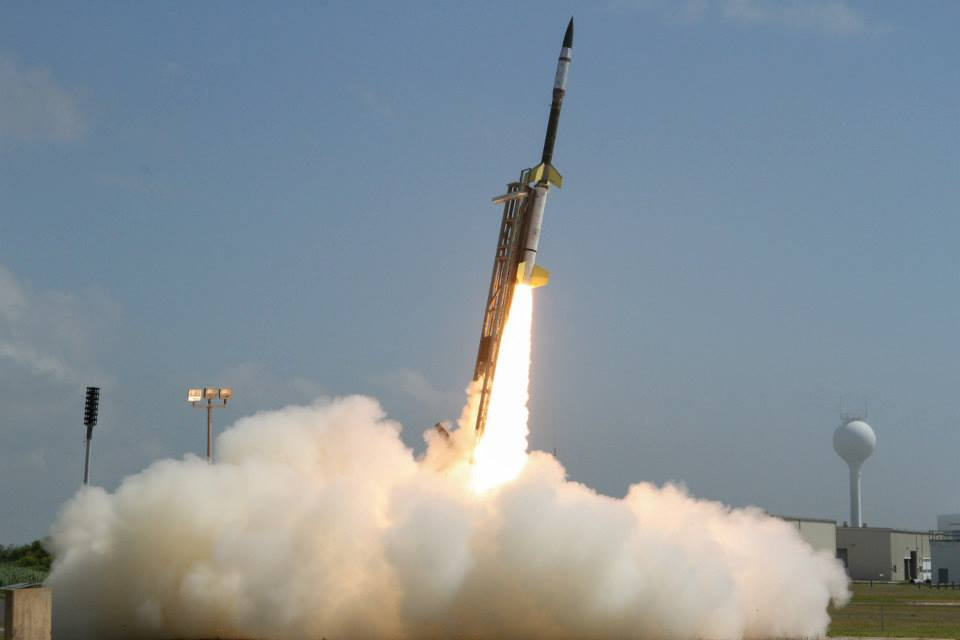
NASA sounding rocket launch from the Wallops Flight Facility

The NASA Sounding Rocket Program (NSRP) is a NASA run program of sounding rockets which has been operating since 1959. The missions carried out by this program are primarily used for scientific research, particularly low gravity and material based research. NASA's sounding rocket program is commonly used by colleges and universities for upper atmosphere research.

== Program ==
In 1965, NASA's cost of a sounding rocket system was $5,000 to $150,000, using combinations of stage motors from the Aerobee, Hercules M5E1 (developed for the Nike Ajax), and Thiokol Apache.

The program was consolidated at the Wallops Flight Facility in the 1980s and uses extra military solid rocket motors. Rockets are frequently launched from fixed facilities at Wallops, the Navy's White Sands Missile Range in New Mexico, the Poker Flat Research Range in Alaska, Kwajalein, Marshall Islands, Pacific Missile Range Facility in Barking Sands, Hawaii, and Andøya Rocket Range, Norway. The rockets are categorized as "Significant Military Equipment" for ITAR.

== Propulsion ==
Rockets in use include single-stage or combinations of:

- Black Brant family, 17.26" diameter
- Improved Orion surplus motor, 14" diameter
- Terrier/Hercules MK12 or MK70 surplus motors, 18" diameter
- Oriole motor
- Magellan Aerospace Nihka exo-atomospheric motor, 17.26" diameter, 192,878 pound-seconds impulse
- Thiokol Improved Malemute TU-758 surplus motor, 16" diameter
- Hercules Talos surplus motor, 30.1" diameter

Some combinations of stages allow payloads of up to 1550 pounds.

== Launches ==
Mission Name	Date	Launch Vehicle	Status
MUMP 9	15 January 1971, 1955 EST	Nike-Tomahawk	Success- University of Michigan's Space Physics Research Laboratory; night-launched 163lb thermosphere probe/cryogenic densitometer/molecular fluorescence densitometer/omegatron payload reached 297.1 km
MUMP 10	15 January 1971, 1530 EST	Nike-Tomahawk	Success- University of Michigan's Space Physics Research Laboratory; day-launched 169lb payload added two Langmuir probes, reached 289.6 km
PolarNOx	27 January 2017	Black Brant IX	Success
DEUCE	30 October 2017	Black Brant IX	Failure - No data recovered but payload was recovered
USIP	25 March 2018	Terrier Malemute	Success
ASPIRE	30 March - 7 September 2018	Black Brant IX	Success

=== PolarNOx ===
The PolarNOx mission was a set of experimental launches used to measure the nitric oxide present in the upper atmosphere that is produced by auroras.

=== DEUCE ===
The DEUCE (Dual-channel Extreme Ultraviolet Continuum Experiment) mission was planned to obtain scientific data about the IGM. This failed however due to problems with the attitude control system.

On 11 July 2022 a Black Brant IX rocket from Arnhem Space Centre launched the fourth DEUCE ultraviolet astronomy mission following flights in 2017, 2018, and 2020 for NASA (CU Boulder). The suborbital flight had apogee of 162 mi (261 km) and was successful.

=== ASPIRE ===
The ASPIRE mission (Advanced Supersonic Parachute Inflation Research Experiment) was an experiment which tested a Mars mission parachute design. The mission consisted of three tests using the Black Brant IX sounding rocket, with the third and final test taking place on Sept. 7, 2018.

=== AZURE ===
The Auroral Zone Upwelling Rocket Experiment in April 2019 caught many Norwegians by surprise by triggering an unusual form of the Aurora Borealis.
