= Solar Mesosphere Explorer =

NASA satellite of the Explorer program

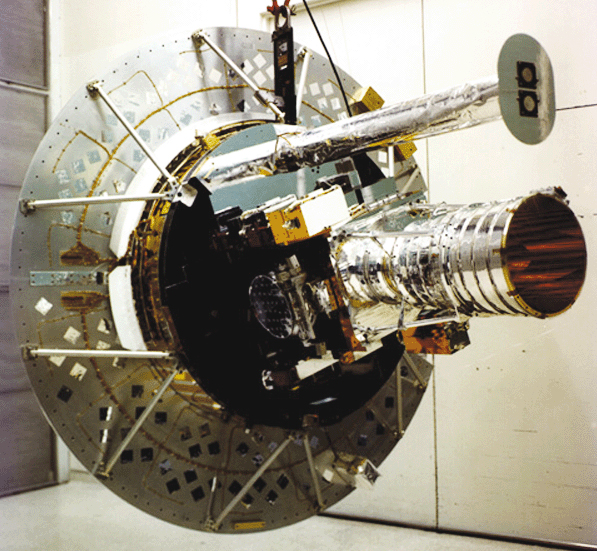
- Solar Mesosphere Explorer (Explorer 64) satellite
- Names: Explorer 64; Solar Mesosphere Explorer
- Mission type: Earth observation
- Operator: NASA / LASP
- COSPAR ID: 1981-100A
- SATCAT no.: 12887
- Mission duration: 7.5 years (achieved)

Spacecraft properties
- Spacecraft: Explorer LXIV
- Spacecraft type: Solar Mesosphere Explorer
- Bus: SME
- Manufacturer: Ball Space Systems
- Launch mass: 437 kg (963 lb)
- Dimensions: Cylinder: 1.25 m (4 ft 1 in) diameter by 1.7 m (5 ft 7 in) high
- Power: Solar panels and nickel-cadmiumd batteries

Start of mission
- Launch date: 6 October 1981, 11:27 UTC
- Rocket: Thor-Delta 2310 (Thor 639 / Delta 157)
- Launch site: Vandenberg, SLC-2W
- Contractor: Douglas Aircraft Company
- Entered service: 6 October 1981

End of mission
- Deactivated: 31 December 1988
- Last contact: 4 April 1989
- Decay date: 5 March 1991

Orbital parameters
- Reference system: Geocentric orbit
- Regime: Low Earth orbit
- Perigee altitude: 535 km (332 mi)
- Apogee altitude: 551 km (342 mi)
- Inclination: 97.56°
- Period: 95.50 minutes

Instruments
- Ultraviolet ozone spectrometer Micrometer spectrometer Nitrogen dioxide spectrometer Four-channel infrared radiometer Solar ultraviolet monitor Solar proton alarm detector

The Solar Mesosphere Explorer (also known as Explorer 64) was a 1980s NASA spacecraft to investigate the processes that create and destroy ozone in Earth's upper atmosphere. The mesosphere is a layer of the atmosphere extending from the top of the stratosphere to an altitude of about 80 km (50 mi). The spacecraft carried five instruments to measure ozone, water vapor, and incoming solar radiation.

== Mission ==
Explorer 64 studied the processes that create and destroy ozone in the Earth's mesosphere. Over its 7.5 years mission, SME measured ultraviolet solar flux, ozone density, and the density of other molecules important to the understanding of ozone chemistry. During the mission over one hundred undergraduate and graduate students were involved in nearly every aspect of SME operations, including planning and scheduling spacecraft and science activities, controlling the spacecraft and its ground support system, and analyzing spacecraft subsystem performance.

== Spacecraft ==
Managed for NASA by the Jet Propulsion Laboratory, the Solar Mesosphere Explorer was built by Ball Space Systems and operated by the Laboratory for Atmospheric and Space Physics of the University of Colorado Boulder.

Characteristics:

- Mass: 437 kilograms;
- Power: Solar panels and nickel-cadmium batteries;
- Configuration: Cylinder 1.25 meter diameter by 1.7 meter high;
- Science instruments: Ultraviolet ozone spectrometer, Micrometre spectrometer, Nitrogen dioxide spectrometer, Four-channel infrared radiometer, Solar ultraviolet monitor, Solar proton alarm detector.

== Launch ==
Launched on 6 October 1981, on a Thor-Delta 2310 from Vandenberg Air Force Base, in California, the satellite returned data until 4 April 1989.

== Atmospheric entry ==
The spacecraft reentered Earth's atmosphere on 5 March 1991.

== See also ==
Explorer program
