= Small Satellite Conference =

- Established: 1987
- Location: Logan, Utah, United States
- Campus: Utah State University

Internationally recognized as the premier conference on small satellites, the Small Satellite Conference (also known as SmallSat) is held each August in Salt Lake City, Utah, USA.

This annual gathering provides a forum for the small satellite community to review recent successes, explore new directions, and introduce emerging technologies in small spacecraft development. In addition to creating an environment for networking and speaking with experts in military, science, and academic fields, the Conference offers a program of international relevance, focusing on the key challenges and opportunities facing the small satellite community today.

== History ==
The first Small Satellite Conference was held in 1987 on the campus of Utah State University in Logan, Utah, USA and has remained there for each succeeding conference. In the beginning, small satellites were not widely accepted but have since become a vital part of the space industry. ‘Small’ is a relative term as mass continually decreases to create new types of small satellites. Though no standard for small satellites is accepted by all, it is generally assumed to include satellites up to 250 kg.

In 1987 there were 50 to 100 attendees. In 2019 there were 3400 participants from over 40 countries that attended the week-long conference.

== Frank J. Redd Student Competition ==
Named after Frank J. Redd, PhD, the founder of the Small Satellite Conference, the Student Competition provides undergraduate and graduate students pursuing a degree in an engineering or scientific discipline with the opportunity to share their work on small satellite concepts and missions.

Each year, college students from across the globe compete for awards made possible through generous donations from organizations and individuals within the small satellite community. Awards are given to competition finalists presenting at the Small Satellite Conference. The number and dollar values of the awards are determined on a yearly basis.
