= IceCube (spacecraft) =

Nanosatellite

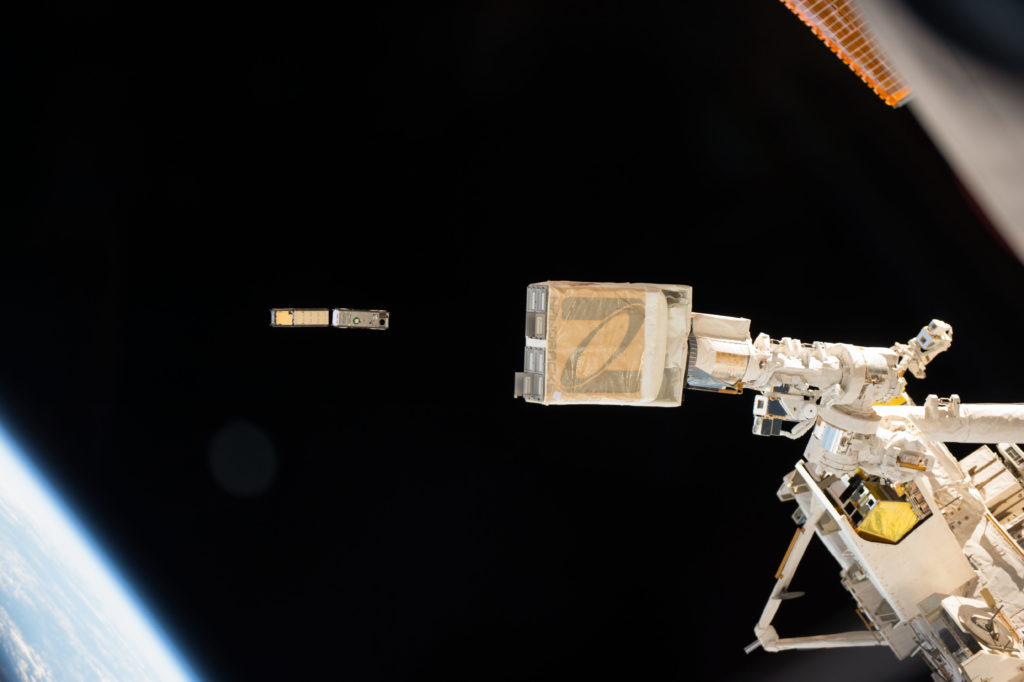
- Deployment of IceCube and CXBN-2 from the International Space Station (ISS)
- Names: Earth-1
- Mission type: Technology demonstration
- Operator: NASA Goddard Space Center
- COSPAR ID: 1998-067LN
- SATCAT no.: 42705
- Mission duration: 1 year, 4 months and 17 days

Spacecraft properties
- Spacecraft type: CubeSat
- Manufacturer: NASA
- Dry mass: 4 kilograms (8.8 lb)
- Dimensions: 10cm x 10cm x 30cm

Start of mission
- Launch date: April 18, 2017
- Rocket: Atlas V 401
- Launch site: Cape Canaveral Space Launch Complex 41
- Contractor: United Launch Alliance
- Deployed from: International Space Station (ISS)
- Deployment date: May 16, 2017

End of mission
- Disposal: Re-entry
- Decay date: October 3, 2018

Orbital parameters
- Reference system: Geocentric
- Regime: Low Earth
- Periapsis altitude: 401 kilometres (249 mi)
- Apoapsis altitude: 404 kilometres (251 mi)
- Inclination: 51.64°

Instruments
- 883 GHz radiometer

IceCube, also known as Earth-1, was a 3U CubeSat satellite funded and developed by NASA. Its goal was to demonstrate and map ice clouds through the use of its 883 GHz radiometer.

== Objectives ==
IceCube was built to map ice clouds globally. It had a submillimeter radiometer to overcome the limitation of ice particles in clouds being opaque in the infrared and visible spectrums. It was made to demonstrate a 833-gigahertz submillimeter-wave receiver as part of a technology demonstration mission.

== Design ==
IceCube was a Sun-pointing spin-stabilized 3U CubeSat with two solar panel arrays. In its compact form, it occupied a volume of 10 x 10 x 30cm.

== Instruments ==
IceCube had a 883 GHz radiometer allowing the penetration of cloud layers and measurement of ice mass. At 883 GHz, radiation is highly sensitive to scattering allowing it to interact with ice in the clouds.

== Launch and mission ==
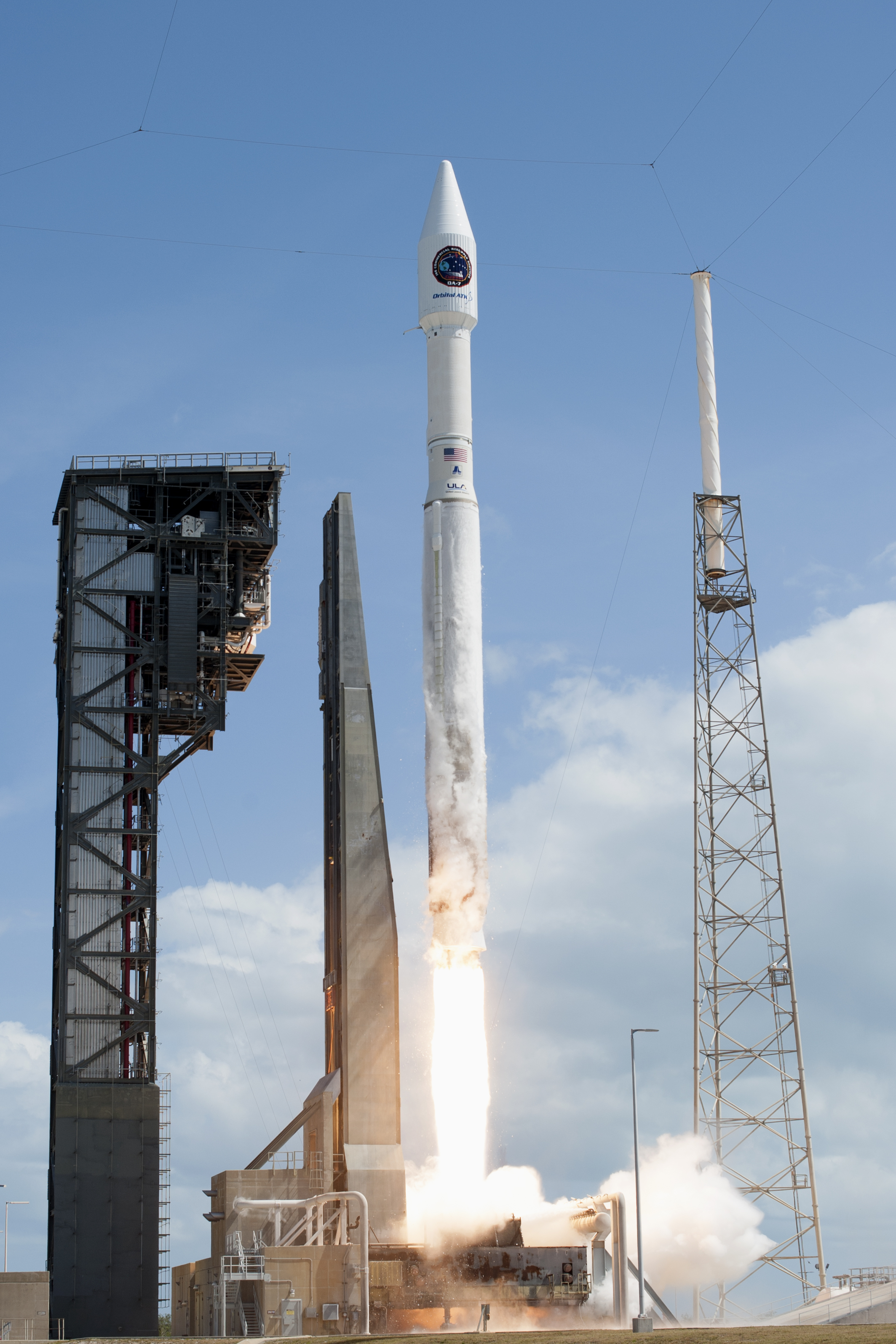
Launch of Cygnus OA-7

Cygnus OA-7 launched on April 18, 2017 as the seventh flight of the Cygnus spacecraft to the ISS as under NASA's Commercial Resupply Services program. The Cygnus spacecraft docked with the ISS on April 2, 2017.

IceCube was deployed from the ISS via the Nanoracks CubeSat Deployer along with several other CubeSats on May 16, 2017. It re-entered the Earth's atmosphere on October 3, 2018, ending its mission.

== See also ==
- Lunar IceCube
