= Variable geometry =

Variable geometry may refer to:

- Variable-geometry turbocharger
- Variable geometry turbomachine
- Variable geometry Europe, a proposed strategy for European integration
- Variable Geometry Self-Propelled Battle Droid
- Variable-sweep wing
- Wing configuration#Variable geometry ways to alter the shape of an aircraft's wings in flight in order to alter their aerodynamic properties
- Anglo-French Variable Geometry (AFVG) aircraft project
