= Thermal vacuum chamber =

In which the radiative thermal environment is controlled

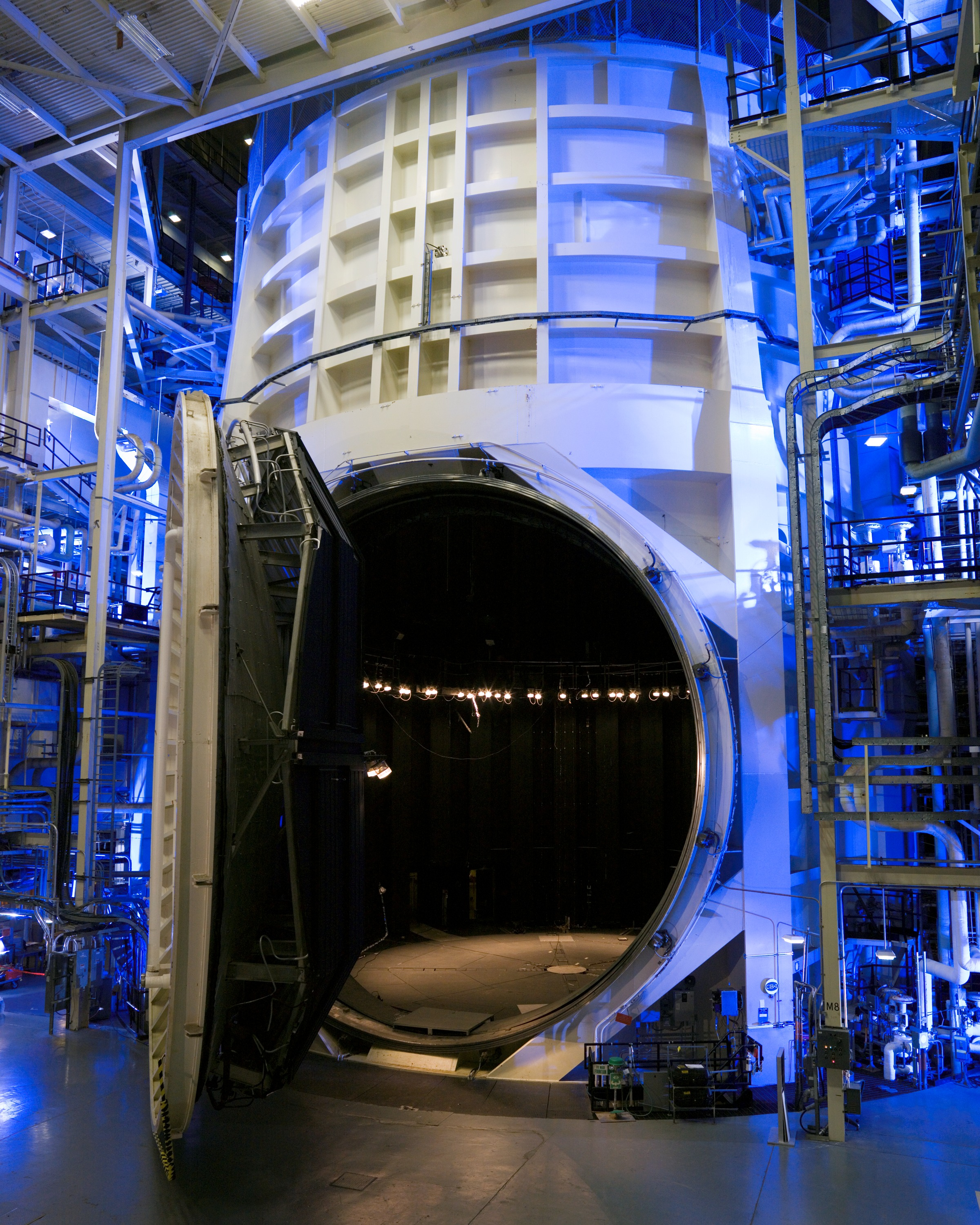
A thermal vacuum test chamber, with its door open, at NASA's Johnson Space Center.

A thermal vacuum chamber (TVAC) is a vacuum chamber in which the radiative thermal environment is controlled.

Typically the thermal environment is achieved by passing liquids or fluids through thermal shrouds for cold temperatures or through the application of thermal lamps for high temperatures.

Thermal vacuum chambers are frequently used for testing spacecraft or parts thereof under a simulated space environment.

== Examples ==
Thermal vacuum chambers can be found at:

- NASA's Space Environment Simulation Laboratory at the Johnson Space Center
- NASA's Space Power Facility, Spacecraft Propulsion Research Facility and Cryogenic Propellant Tank Facility (K-Site) at the Glenn Research Center
- NASA's Space Environment Simulator at Goddard Space Flight Center
- NASA's DynaVac 36" T/V Chamber
- The ESA Large Space Simulator

== See also ==
- Vacuum engineering
