= Space Power Facility =

NASA test stand and vacuum chamber

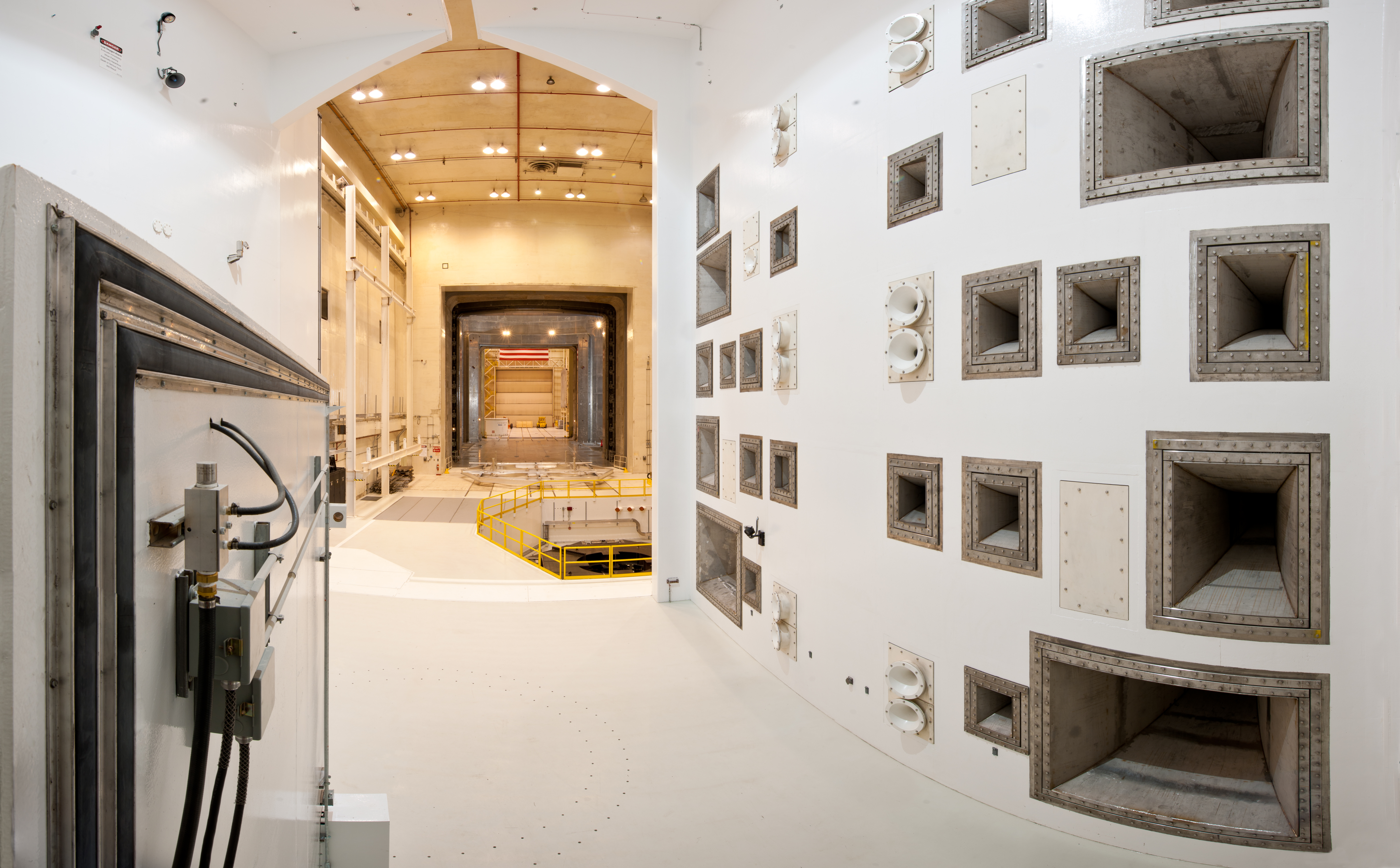
NASA's Space Power Facility with RATF shown closest, then MVF and the modal plate, then the thermal-vac chamber

Space Power Facility (SPF) is a NASA facility used to test spaceflight hardware under simulated launch and spaceflight conditions. The SPF is part of NASA's Neil A. Armstrong Test Facility, which in turn is part of the Glenn Research Center. The Neil A. Armstrong Test Facility and the SPF are located near Sandusky, Ohio (Oxford Township, Erie County, Ohio).

The SPF is able to simulate a spacecraft's launch environment, as well as in-space environments. NASA has developed these capabilities under one roof to optimize testing of spaceflight hardware while minimizing transportation issues. Space Power Facility has become a "One Stop Shop" to qualify flight hardware for crewed space flight. This facility provides the capability to perform the following environmental testing:

- Thermal-vacuum testing
- Reverberation acoustic testing
- Mechanical vibration testing
- Modal testing
- Electromagnetic interference and compatibility testing

== Thermal-vacuum test chamber ==
This is a vacuum chamber built by NASA in 1969. It stands 122 feet (37 m) high and 100 feet (30 m) in diameter, enclosing a bullet-shaped space. It is the world's largest thermal vacuum chamber. It was originally commissioned for nuclear-electric power studies under vacuum conditions, but was later decommissioned. It was subsequently recommissioned for use in testing spacecraft propulsion systems. Recent uses include testing the airbag landing systems for the Mars Pathfinder and the Mars Exploration Rovers Spirit and Opportunity, under simulated Mars atmospheric conditions.

The facility was designed and constructed to test both nuclear and non-nuclear space hardware in a simulated low-Earth-orbiting environment. Although the facility was designed for testing nuclear hardware, only non-nuclear tests have been performed throughout its history. Test programs performed at the facility include high-energy experiments, rocket-fairing separation tests, Mars Lander system tests, deployable solar sail tests, and International Space Station hardware tests. The facility can sustain a high vacuum (10^{−6} torr, 130 μPa), and simulate solar radiation via a 4 MW quartz heat lamp array, solar spectrum by a 400 kW arc lamp, and cold environments (−320 °F (−195.6 °C)) with a variable geometry cryogenic cold shroud.

The facility is available on a full-cost reimbursable basis to government, universities, and the private sector.

=== Aluminum test chamber ===
The aluminum test chamber is a vacuum-tight aluminum plate vessel that is 100 feet (30 m) in diameter and 122 feet (37 m) high. Designed for an external pressure of 2.5 psi (17 kPa) and internal pressure of 5 psi (34 kPa), the chamber is constructed of Type 5083 aluminum which is a clad on the interior surface with a 1/8 in (3.2 mm) thick type 3003 aluminum for corrosion resistance. This material was selected because of its low neutron absorption cross-section. The floor plate and vertical shell are 1 inch (25 mm) (total) thick, while the dome shell is 1 3/8 in (35 mm). Welded circumferentially to the exterior surface is aluminum structural T-section members that are 3 feet (0.9 m) deep and 2 feet (0.6 m) wide. The doors of the test chamber are 50 by 50 feet (15 by 15 m) in size and have double door seals to prevent leakage. The chamber floor was designed for a load of 300 tons.

=== Concrete chamber enclosure ===
The concrete chamber enclosure serves not only as a radiological shield but also as a primary vacuum barrier from atmospheric pressure. 130 feet (40 m) in diameter and 150 feet (46 m) in height, the chamber was designed to withstand atmospheric pressure outside of the chamber at the same time vacuum conditions are occurring within. The concrete thickness varies from 6 to 8 feet (1.8 to 2.4 m) and contains a leak-tight steel containment barrier embedded within. The chamber's doors are 50 by 50 feet (15 by 15 m) and have inflatable seals. The space between the concrete enclosure and the aluminum test chamber is pumped down to a pressure of 20 torrs (2.7 kPa) during a test.

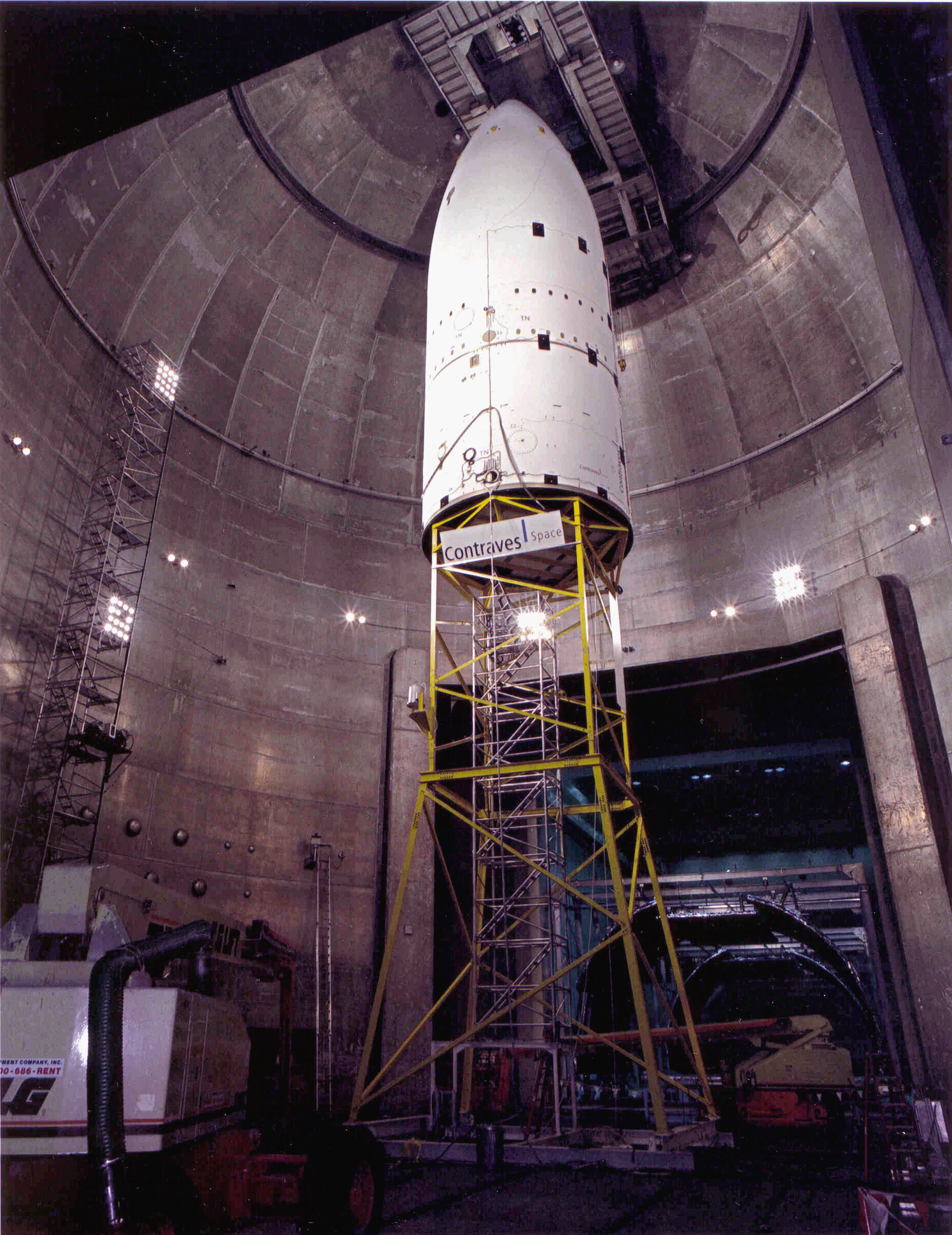
Interior of the Space Power Facility

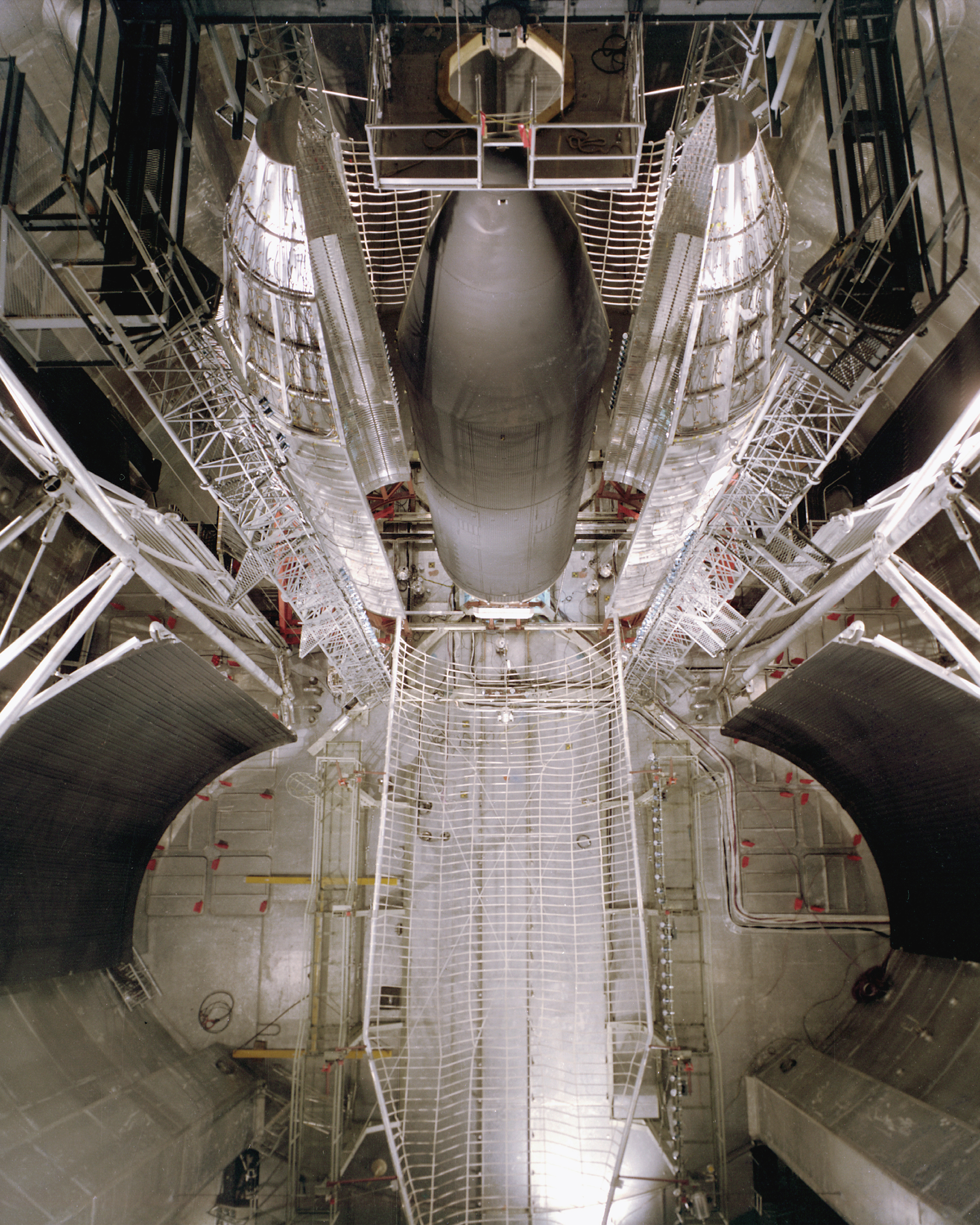
Centaur Standard Shroud at the Space Power Facility

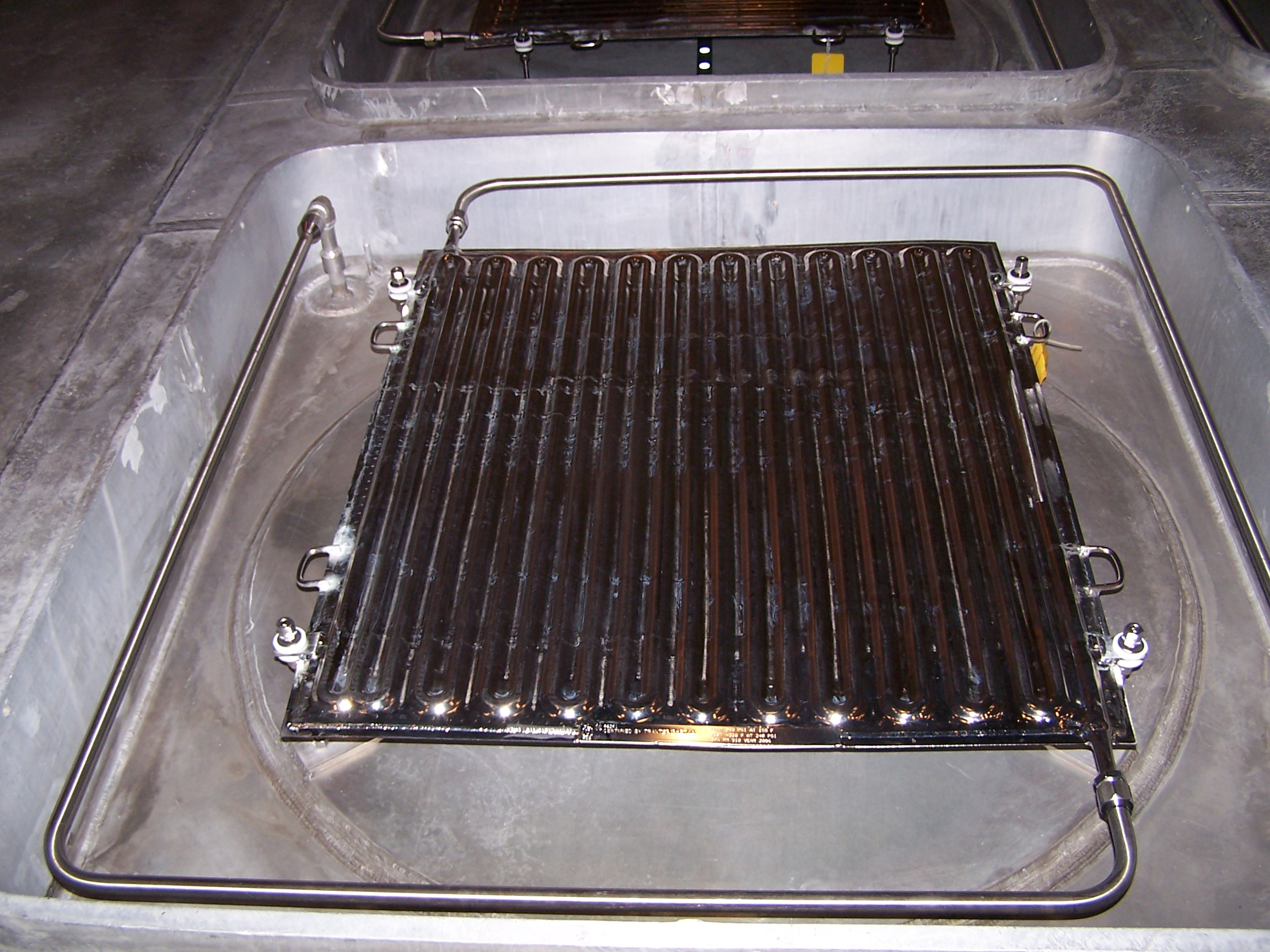
NASA's SPF thermal-vac chamber scavenger plate

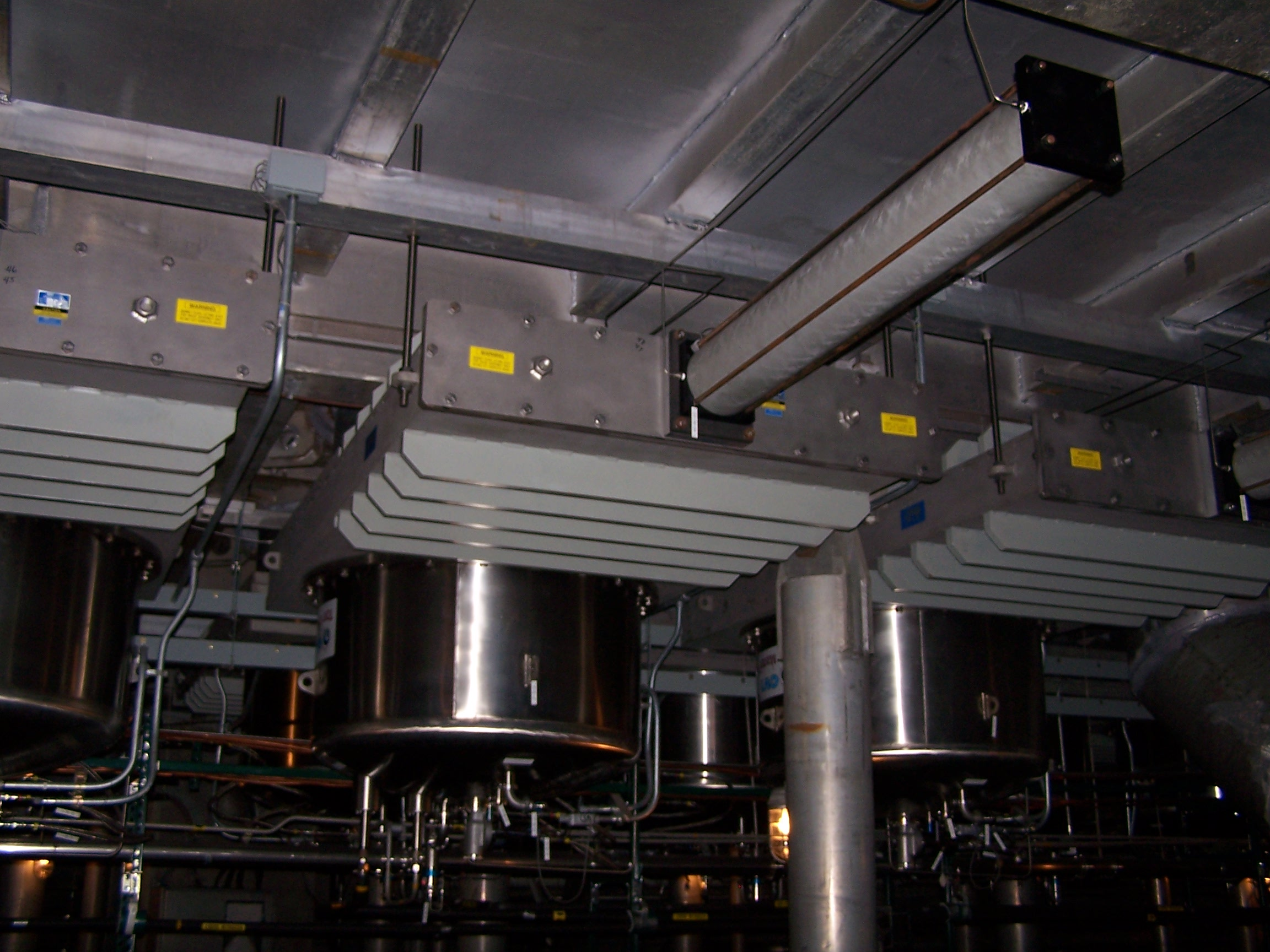
NASA's SPF thermal-vac chamber VacCryo pump as seen from the annulus basement

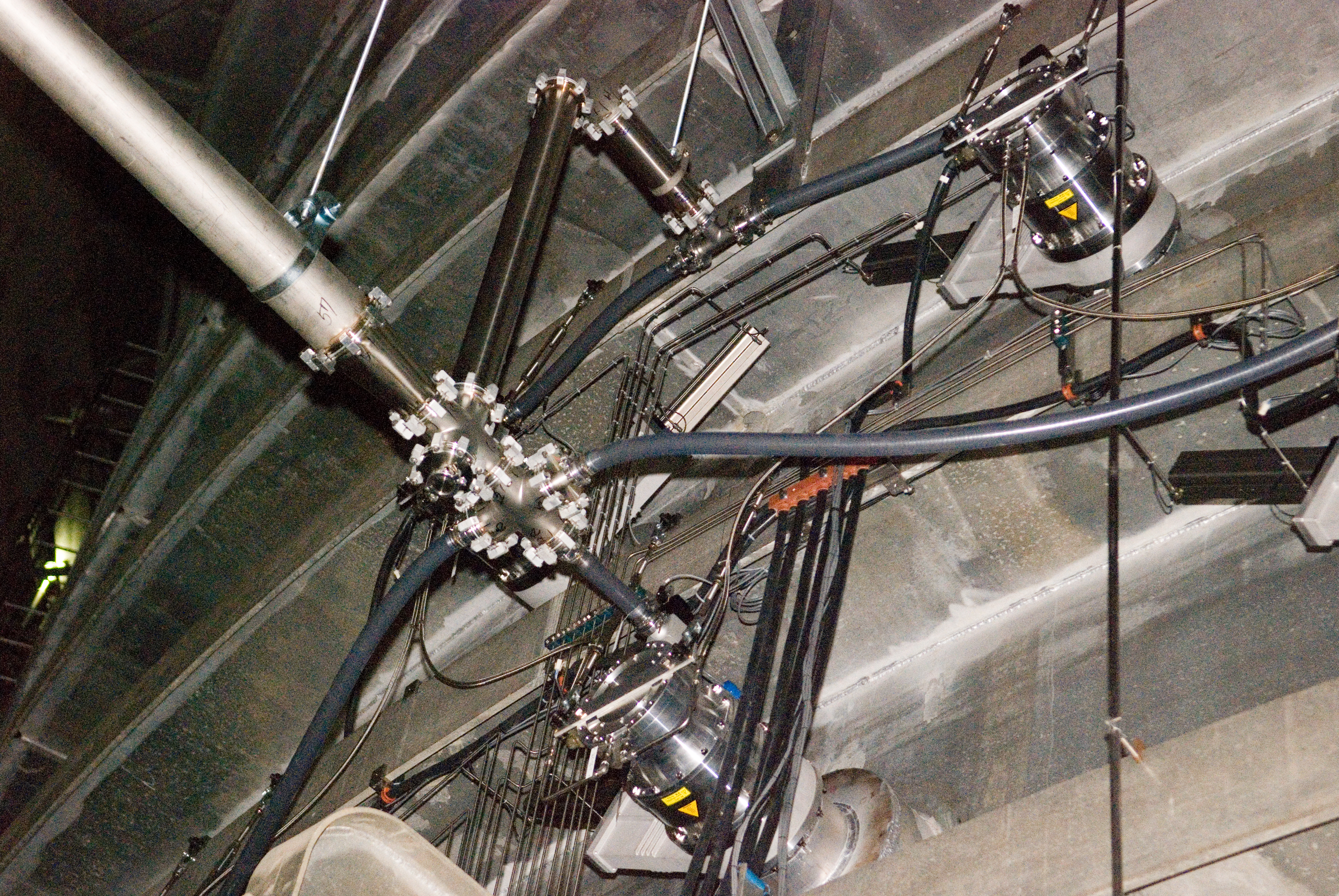
NASA's SPF thermal-vac chamber turbo molecular pumps

Brian Cox of the BBC's Human Universe filmed a rock and feather drop episode at the Space Power Facility.

=== Electromagnetic interference/compatibility (EMI/EMC) functionality ===
Designed specifically as a large-scale thermal-vacuum test chamber for qualification testing of vehicles and equipment in outer-space conditions, it was discovered in the late 2000s that the unique construction of the SPF interior aluminum vacuum chamber also makes it an extremely large and electrically complex microwave or radio frequency cavity with excellent reverberant electro-magnetic characteristics. In 2009 these characteristics were measured by the National Institute of Standards and Technology and others after which the facility was understood to be, not only the world's largest vacuum chamber, but also the world's largest EMI/EMC test facility. In 2011, the Glenn Research Center successfully performed a calibration of the aluminum vacuum chamber using IEC 61000-4-21 methodologies. As a result of these activities, the SPF can perform radiated susceptibility EMI tests for vehicles and equipment per MIL-STD-461, and can achieve MIL-STD-461F limits above approximately 80 MHz. In the spring of 2017 the low-power characterizations and calibrations from 2009 and 2011 were proven correct in a series of high-power tests performed in the chamber to validate its capabilities. The SPF chamber is currently being prepared for EMI radiated susceptibility testing of the crew module for the Artemis 1 of NASA's Orion spacecraft.

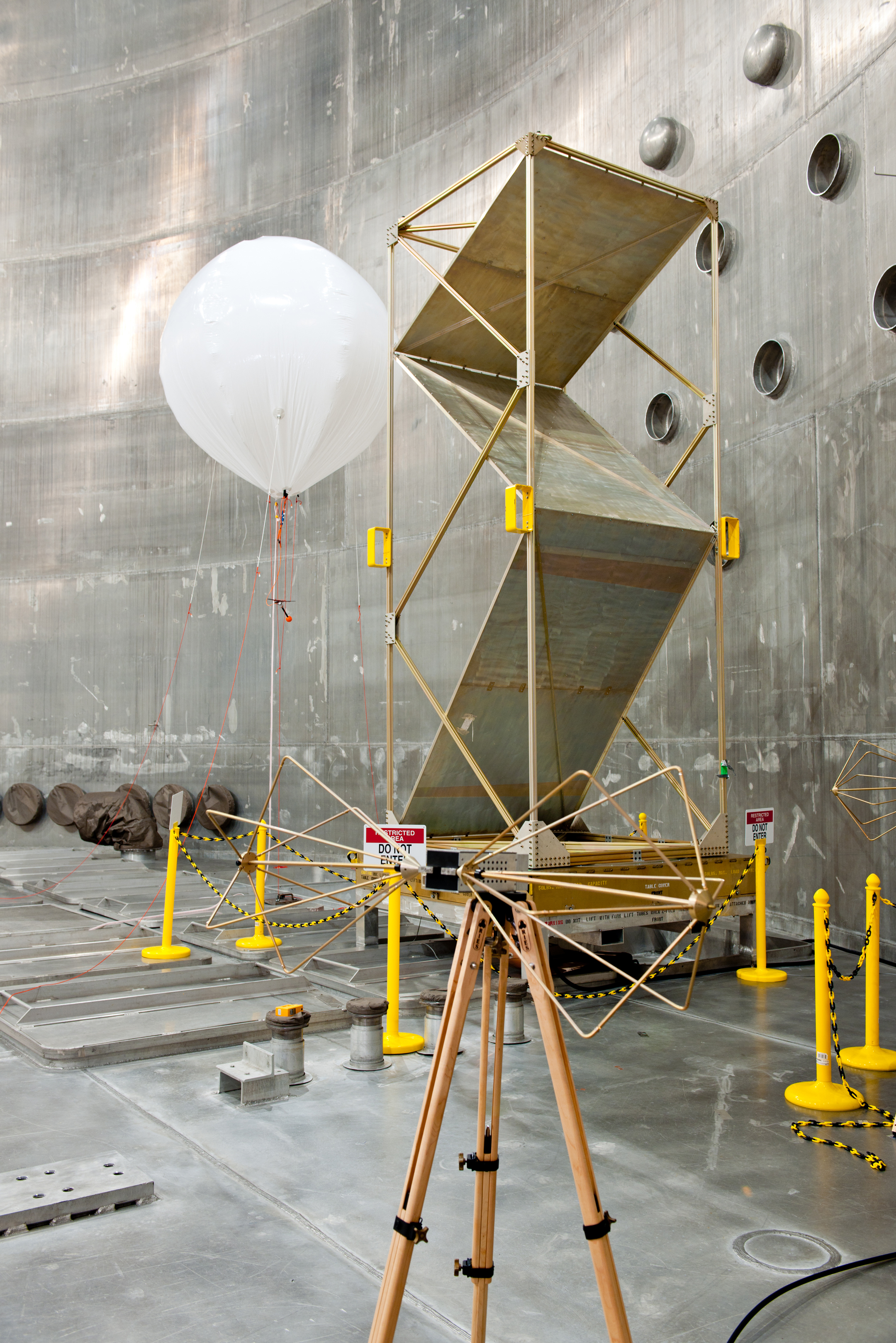
EMI mode stirrer in the thermal-vacuum chamber

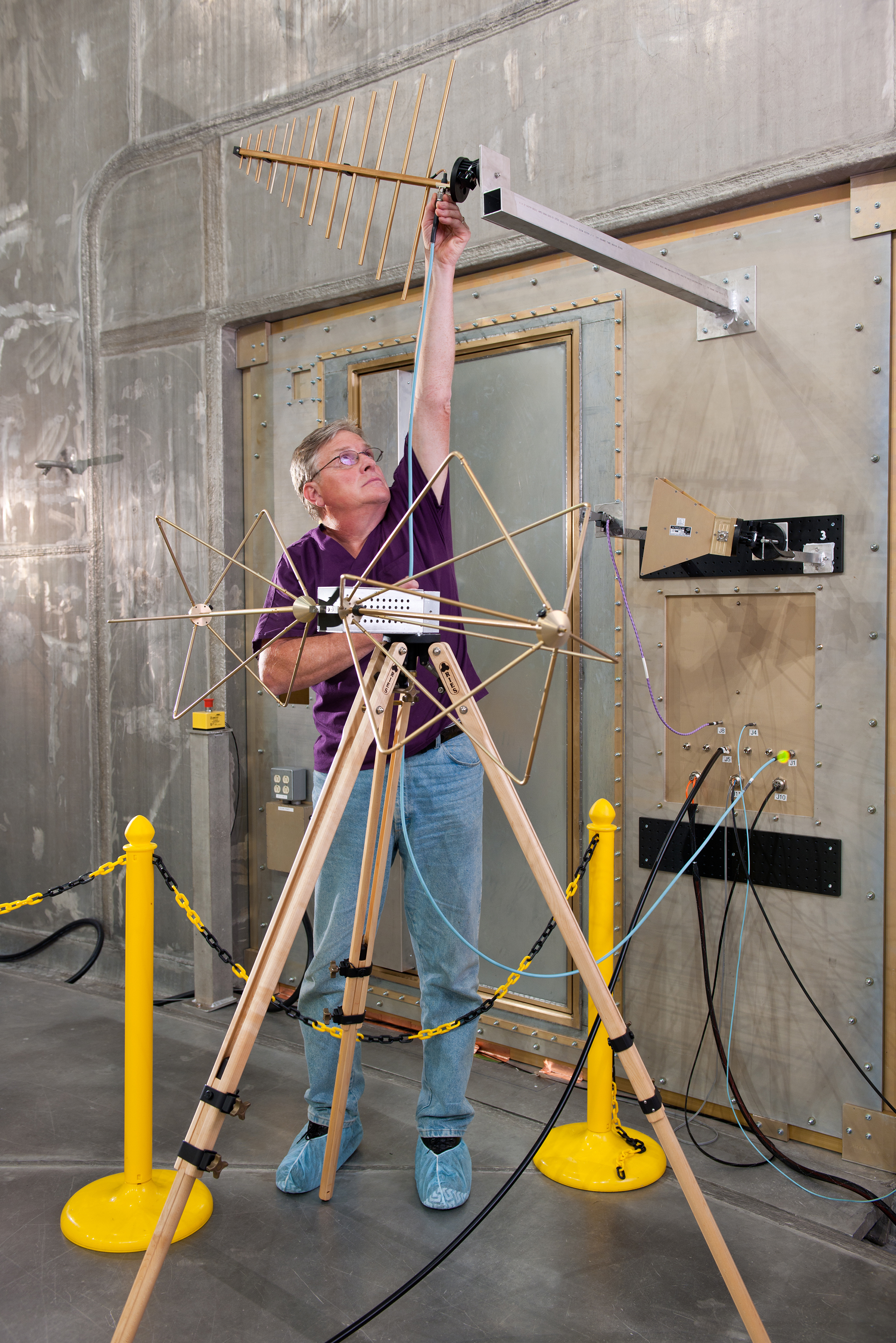
Installation of EMI equipment in the thermal-vacuum chamber

== Reverberant Acoustic Test Facility ==
The Reverberant Acoustic Test Facility has 36 nitrogen-driven horns to simulate the high noise levels that are experienced during a space vehicle launch and supersonic ascent conditions. The RATF is capable of an overall sound pressure level of 163 dB within a 101,500-cubic-foot (2,870 m^{3}) chamber.

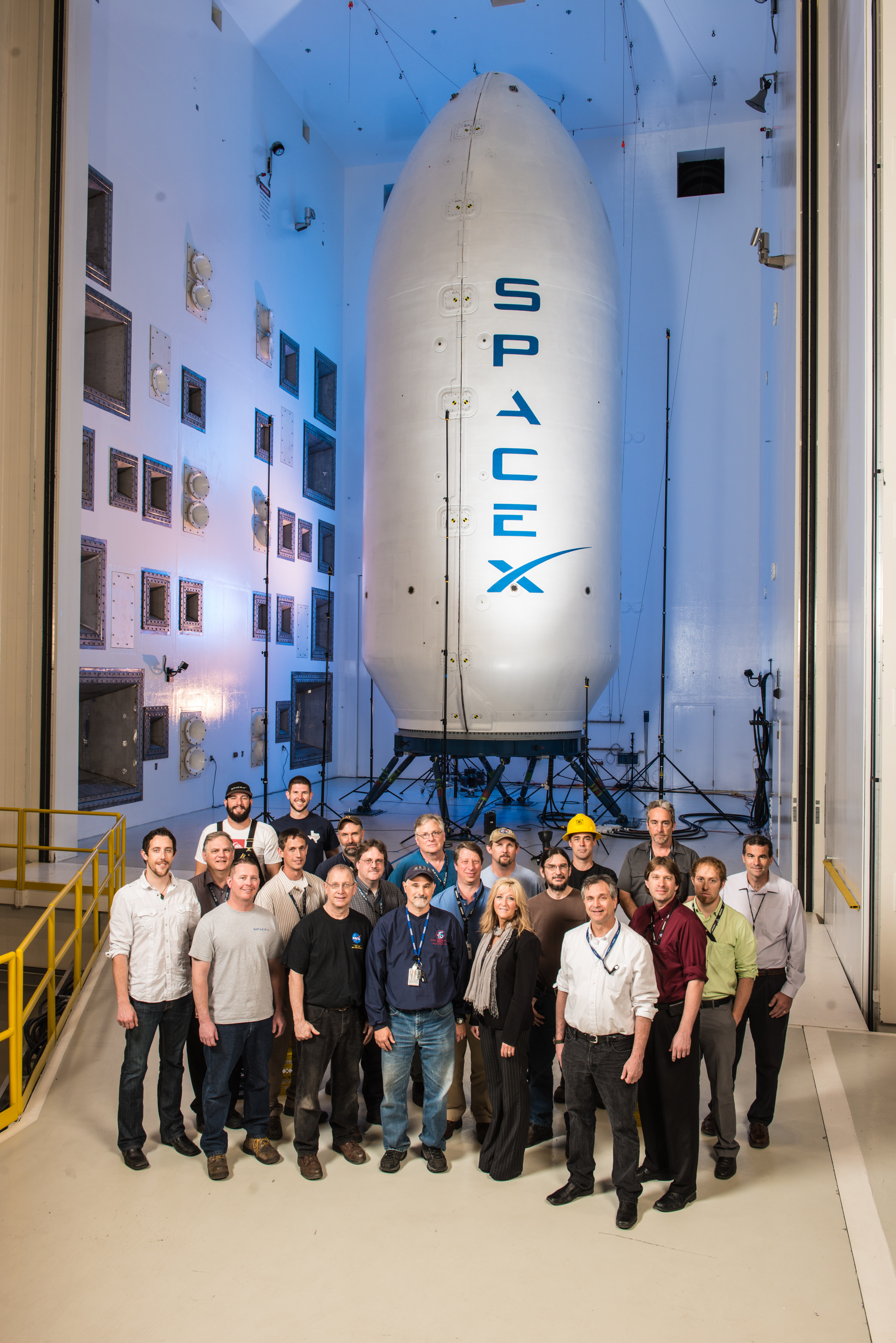
The SpaceX Falcon 9 fairing was the first test article to utilize NASA's (RATF).

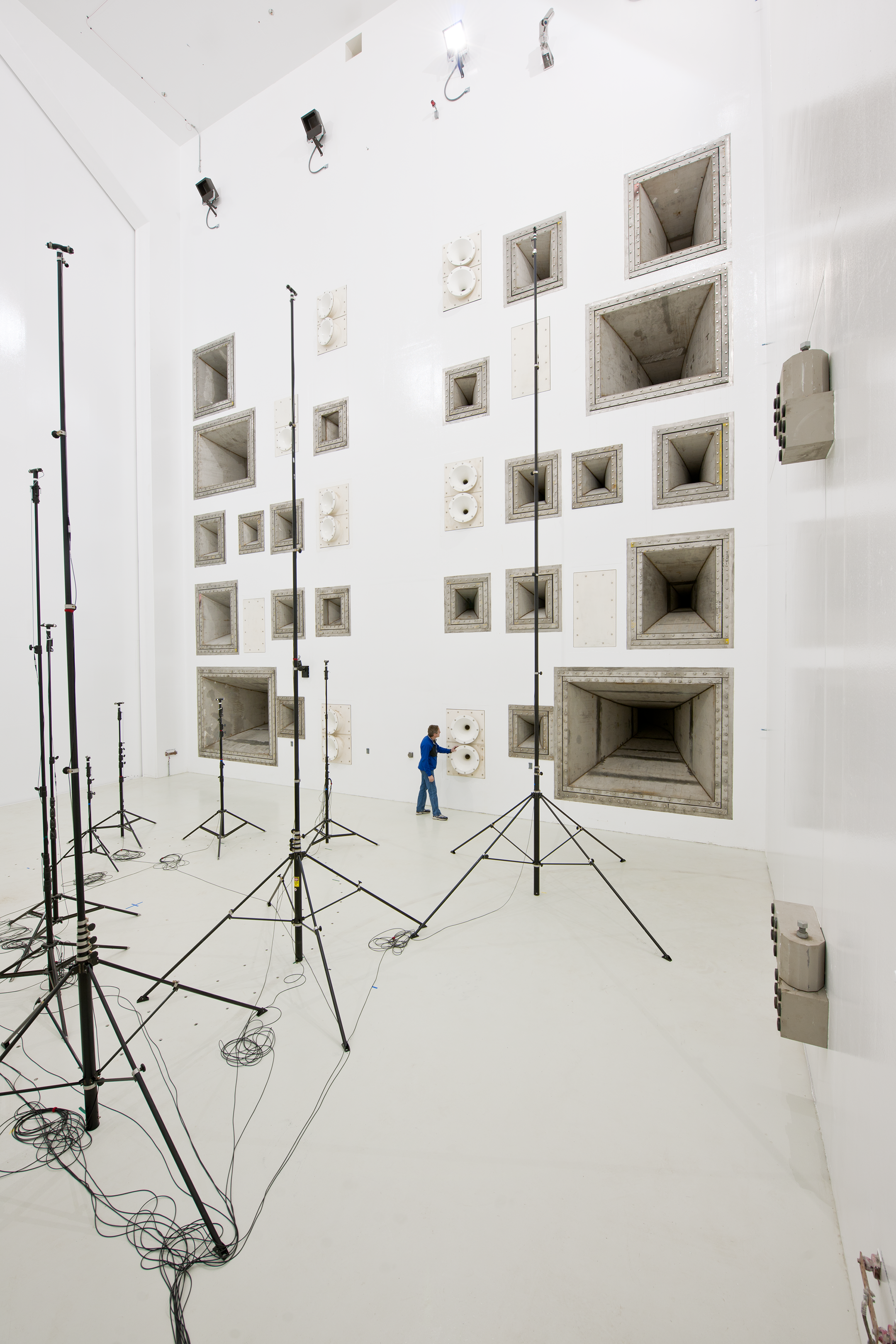
Reverberant Acoustic Test Facility

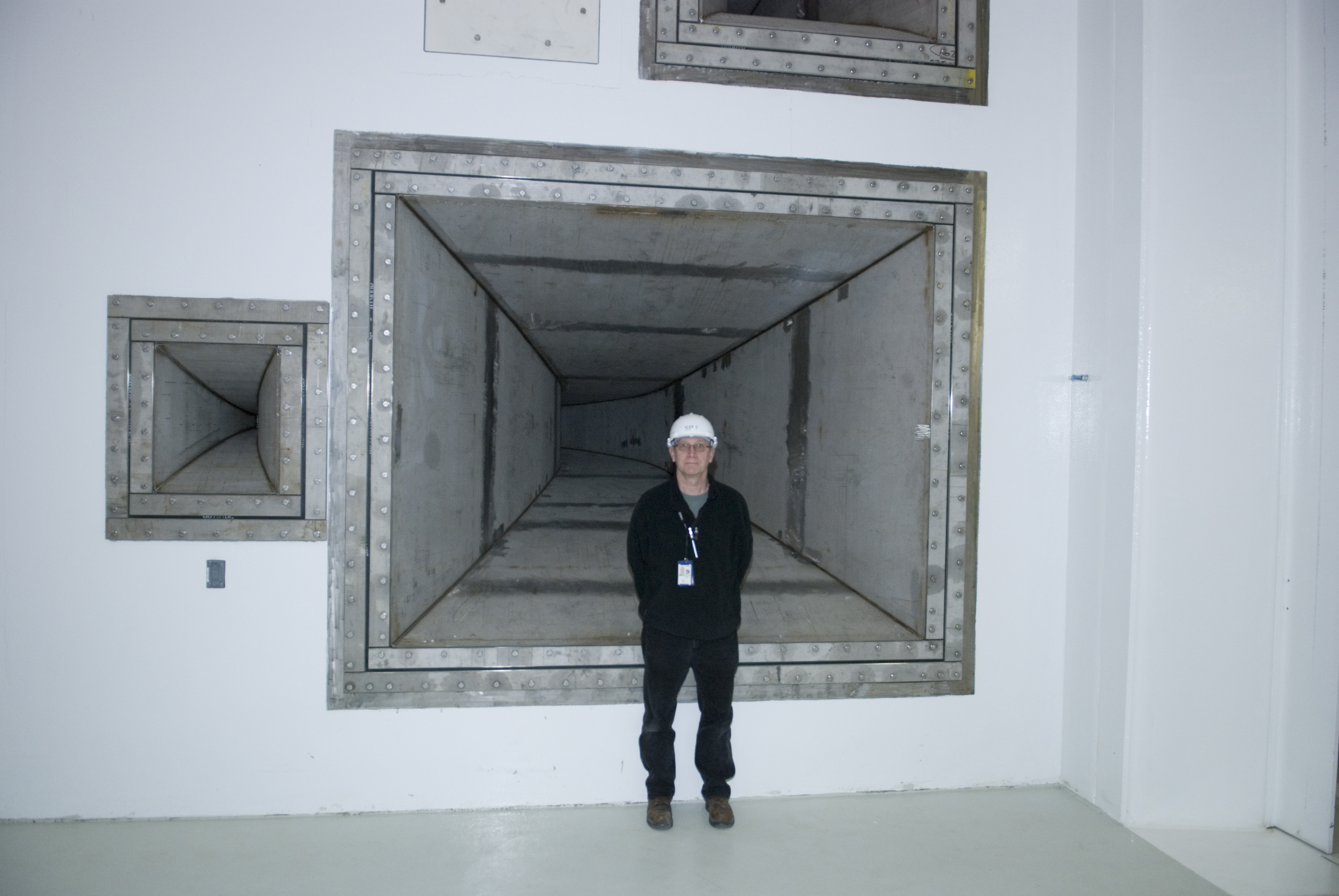
Larry Opper in front of one of the 25 Hz horns in the RATF

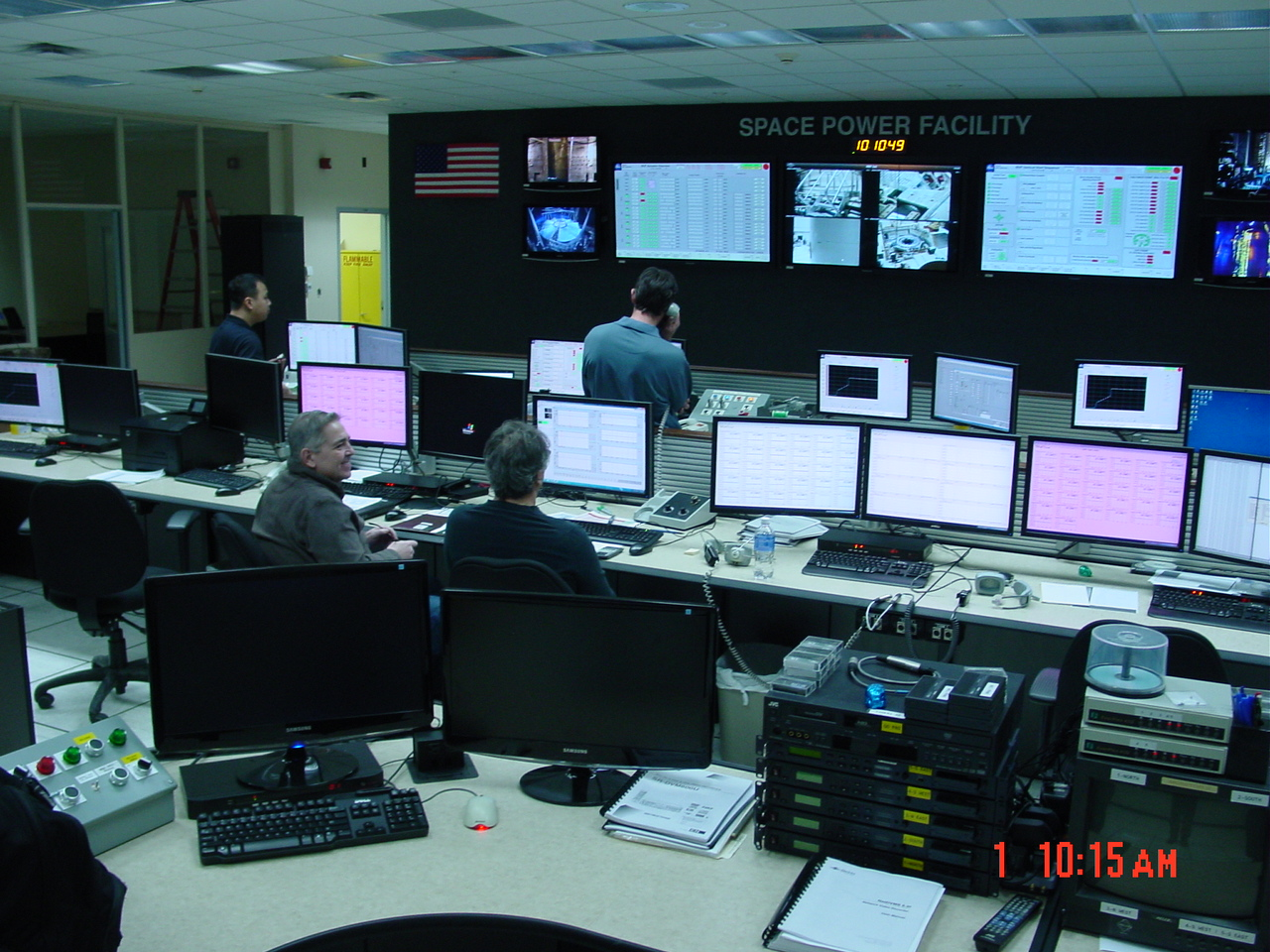
NASA's Vibro-Acoustic Control Room at the Space Power Facility

== Mechanical Vibration Test Facility ==
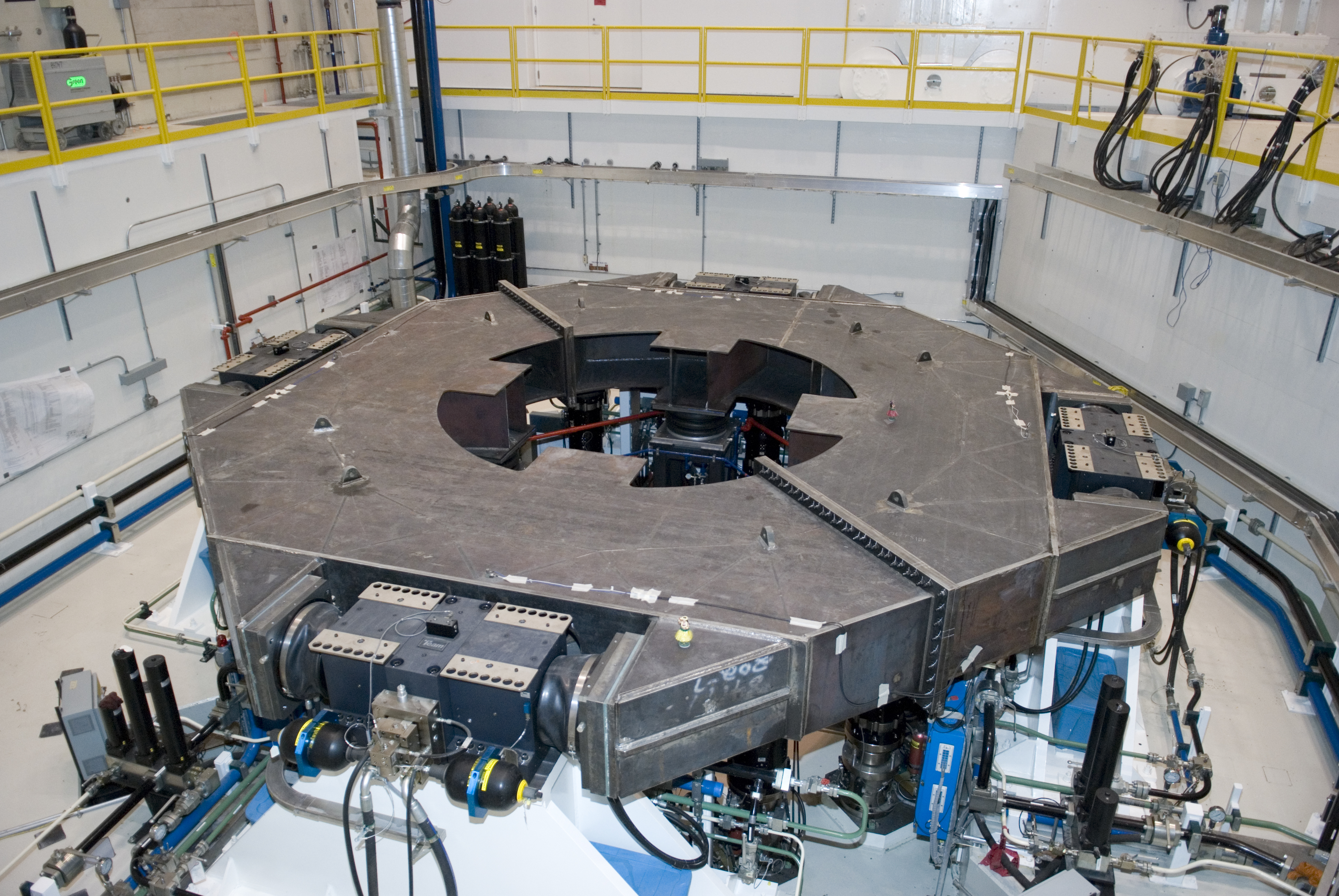
NASA's MVF Mechanical Vibration Facility

The Mechanical Vibration Test Facility (MVF) is a three-axis vibration system. It will apply vibration in each of the three orthogonal axes (not simultaneously) with one direction in parallel to the Earth-launch thrust axis (X) at 5–150 Hz, 0-1.25 g-pk vertical, and 5–150 Hz 0-1.0 g-pk for the horizontal axes.

Vertical, or the thrust axis, shaking is accomplished by using 16 vertical actuators manufactured by TEAM Corporation, each capable of 30,000 lbf (130 kN). The 16 vertical actuators allow for testing of up to a 75,000 lb (34,000 kg) article at the previously stated frequency and amplitude limits.

Horizontal shaking is accomplished by four TEAM Corporation Horizontal Actuators. The horizontal actuators are used during vertical testing to counteract cross axis forces and overturning moments.

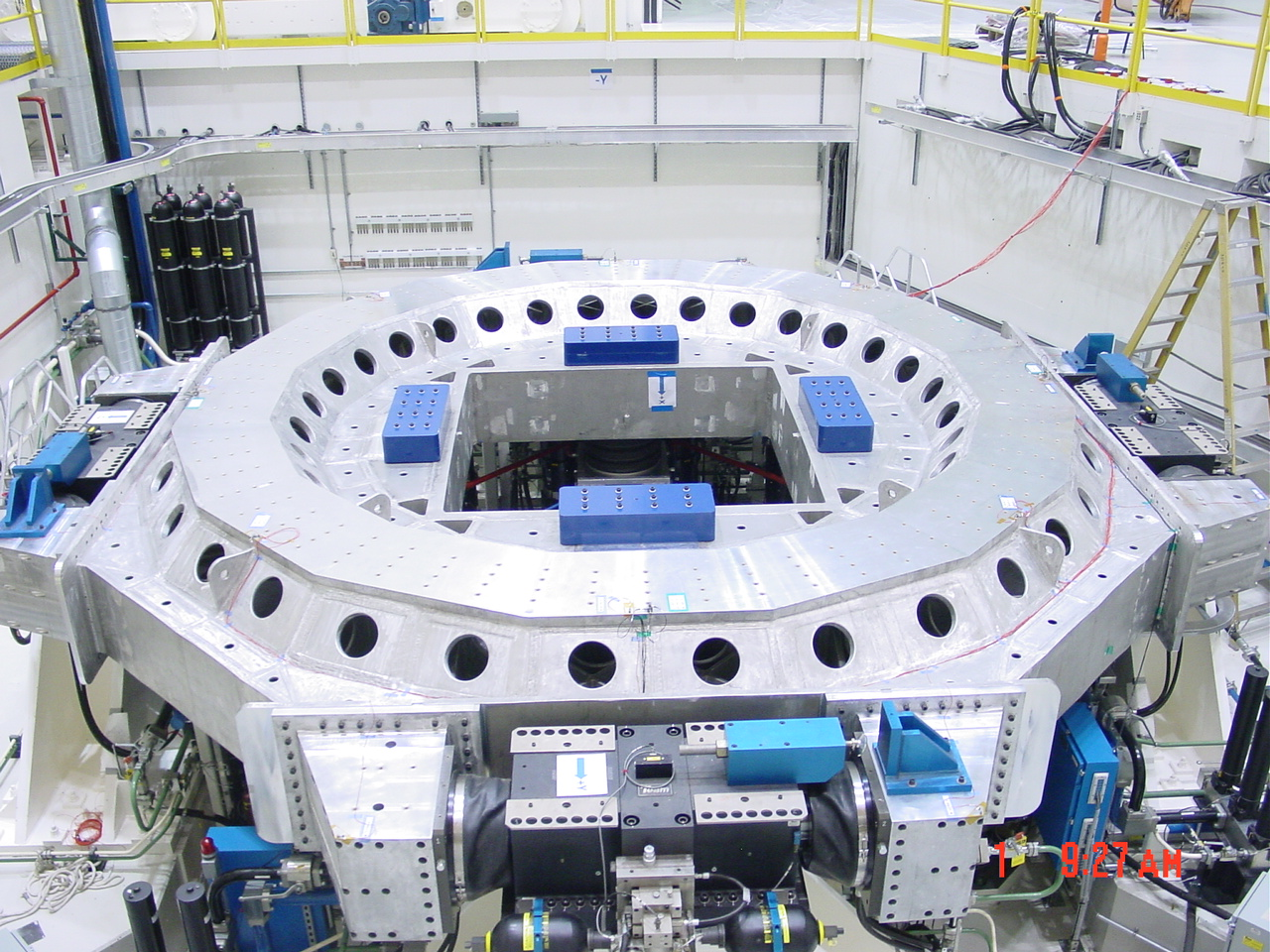
Mechanical Vibration Facility with the table installed

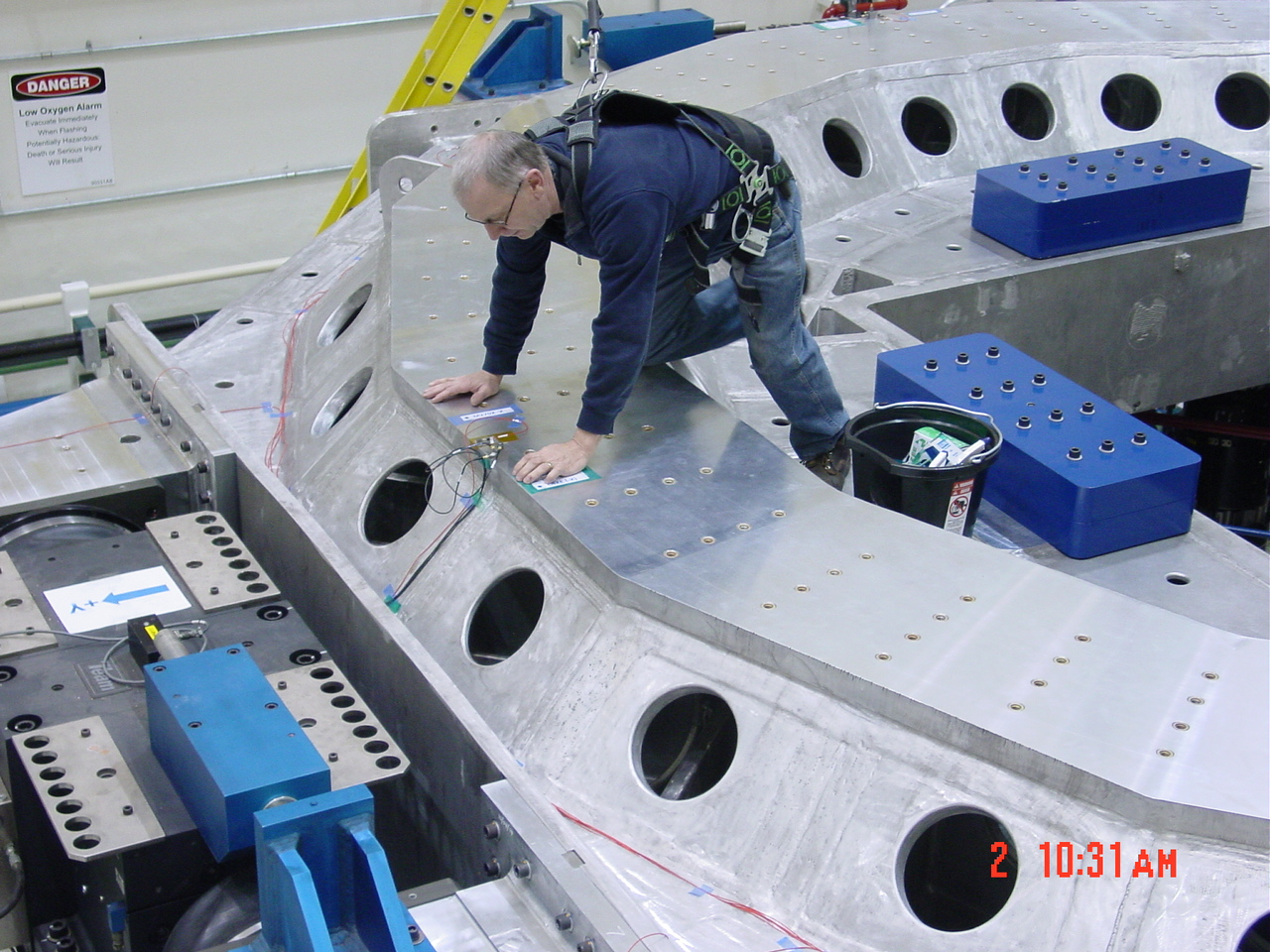
Control accelerometer installation

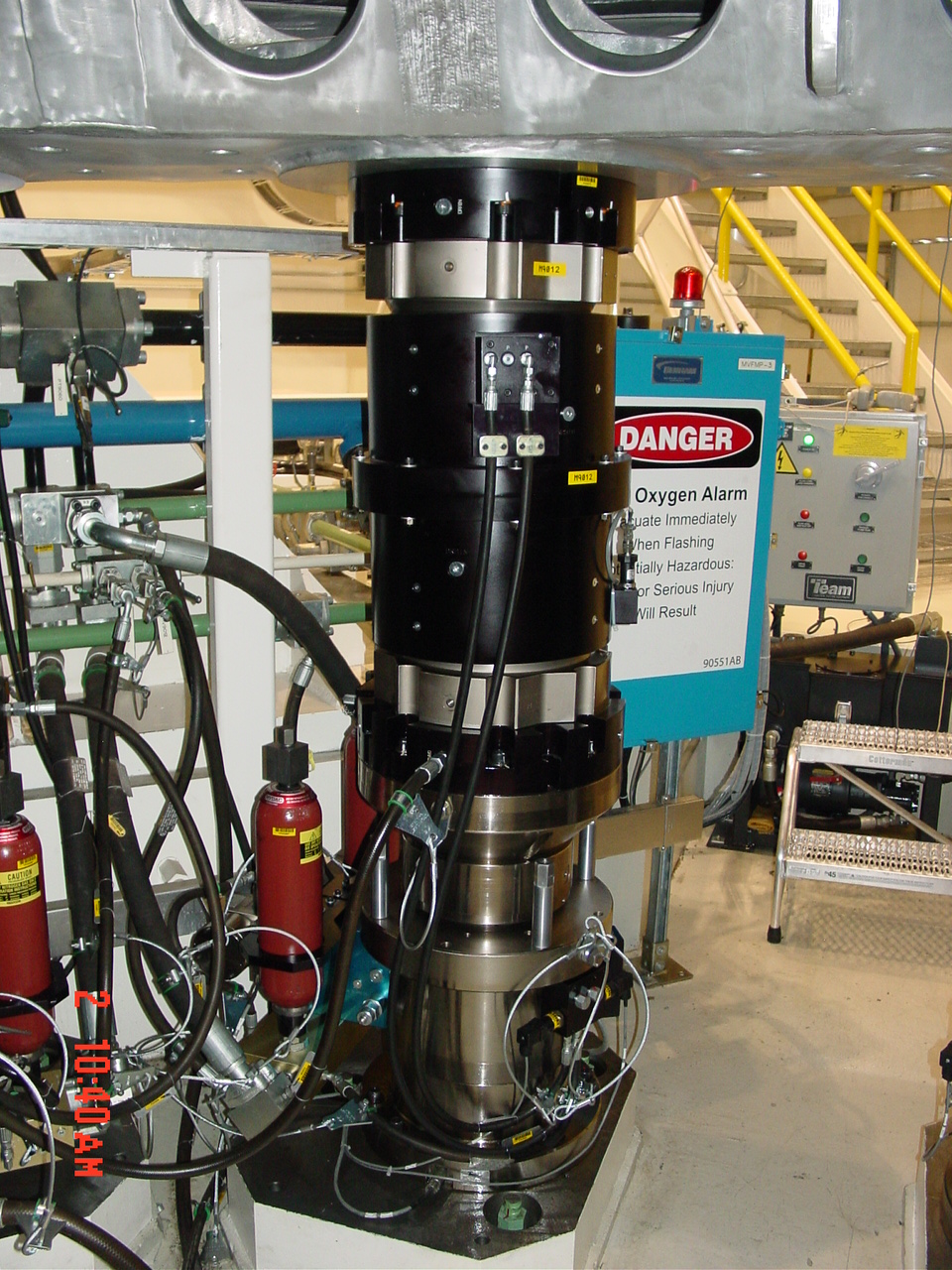
One of 16 vertical actuators and spherical coupling assemblies for the MVF

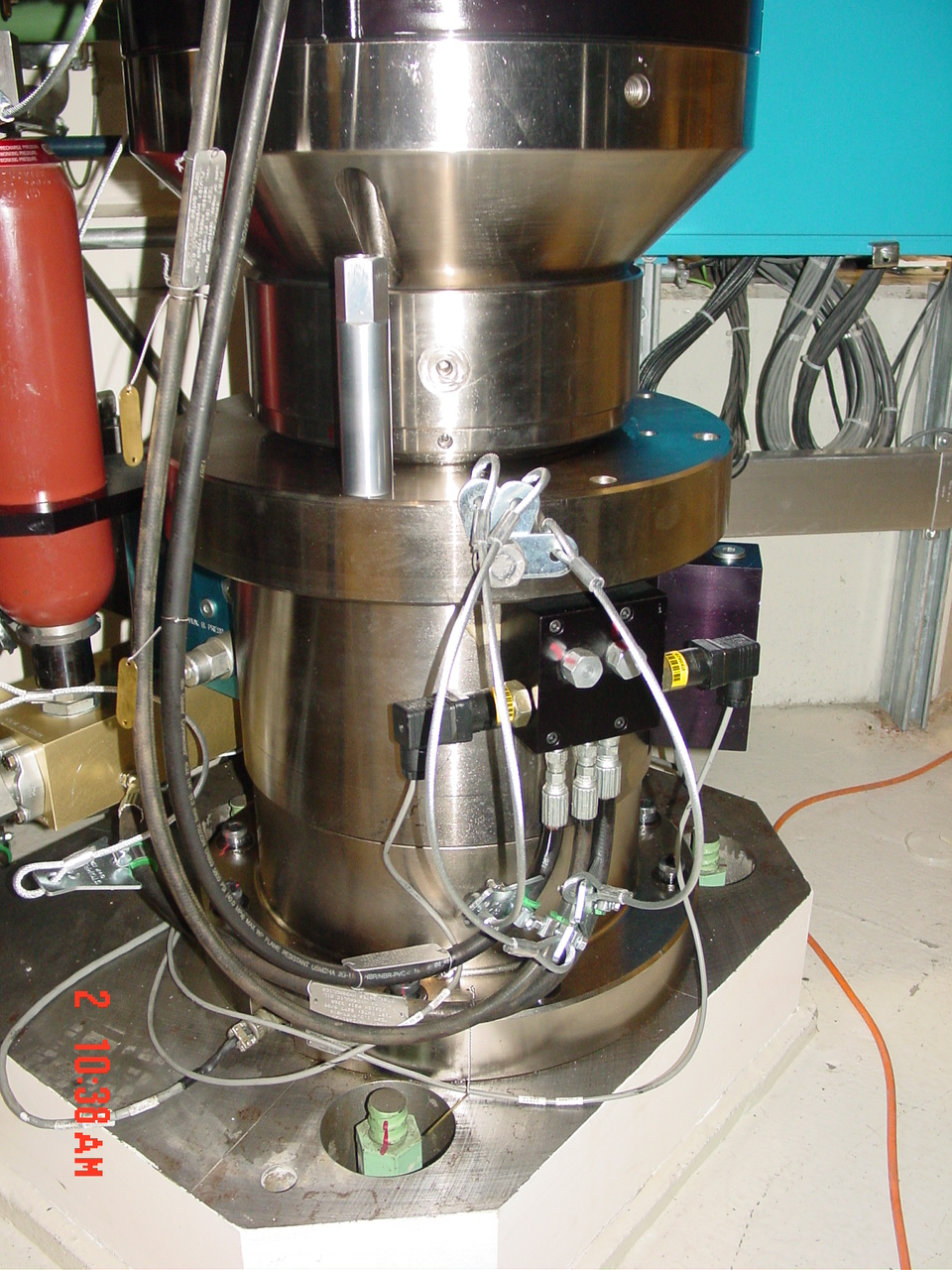
Vertical actuator

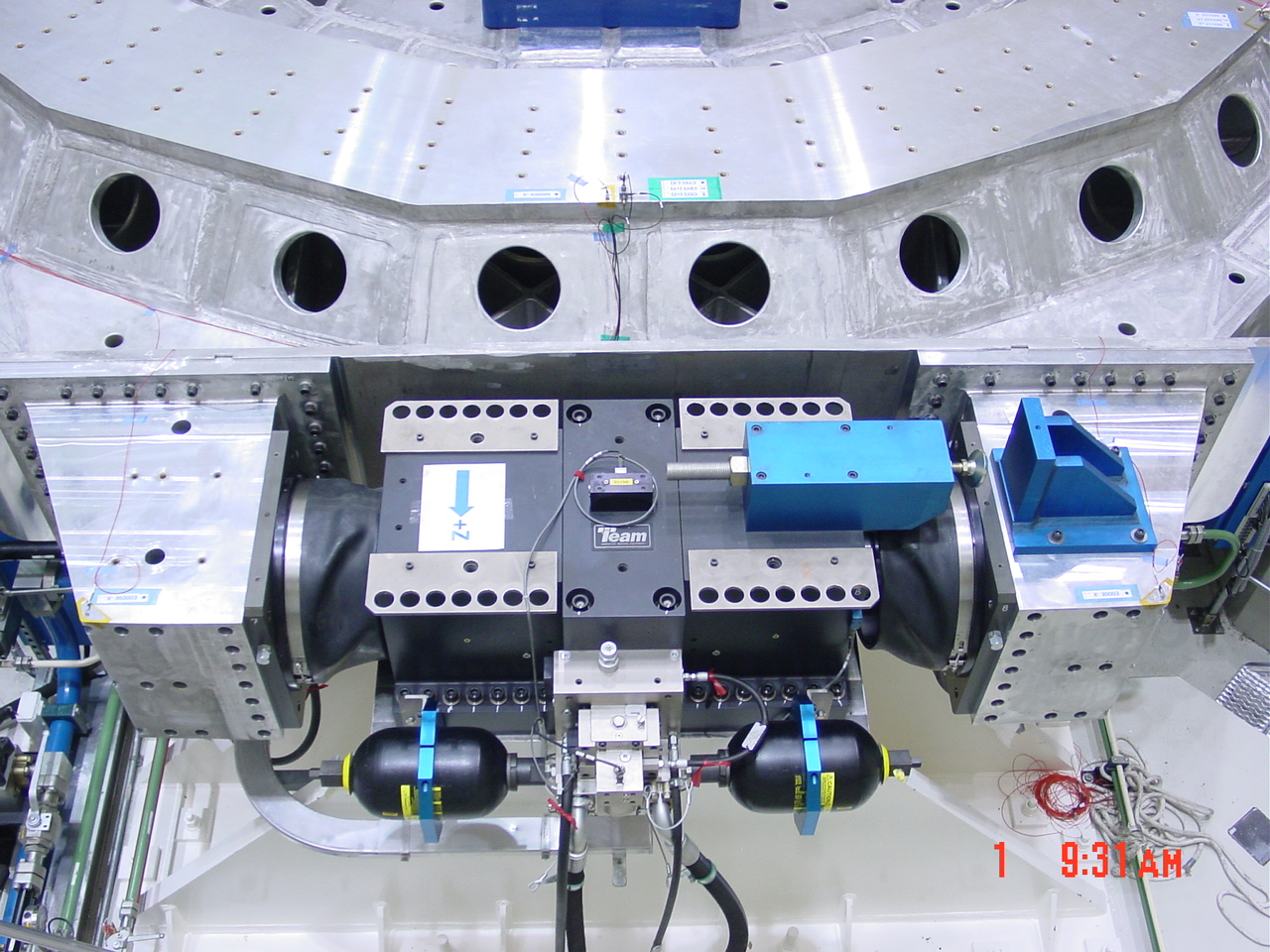
TEAM horizontal actuator for the Mechanical Vibration Facility

== Modal test facility ==
In addition to the sine vibe table, a fixed-base modal floor sufficient for the 20 ft (6.1 m) diameter test article is available. The fixed-base modal test facility is a 6 in (150 mm) thick steel floor on top of 19 ft (5.8 m) of concrete, that is tied to the earth using 50 ft (15 m) deep tensioned rock anchors.

There were over 21,000,000 pounds (9,500 t) of rock anchors, and 6,000,000 pounds (2,700 t) of concrete used in the construction of the fixed-base modal test facility and mechanical vibration test facility.

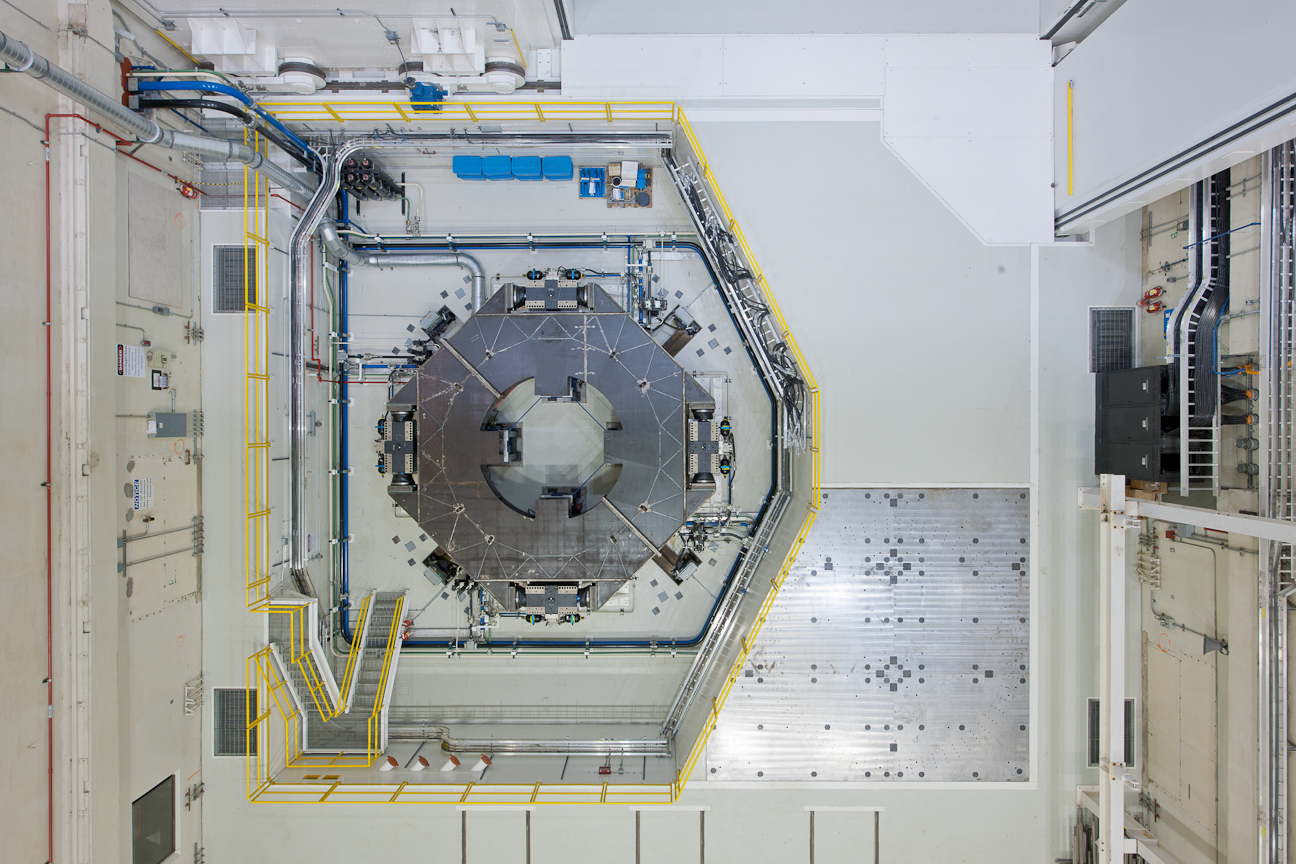
The modal test facility is a 6 in (150 mm) steel plate on top of 19 ft (5.8 m) of concrete, that is then tied to the shale utilizing tensioned rock anchors that are 50 ft (15 m) long.

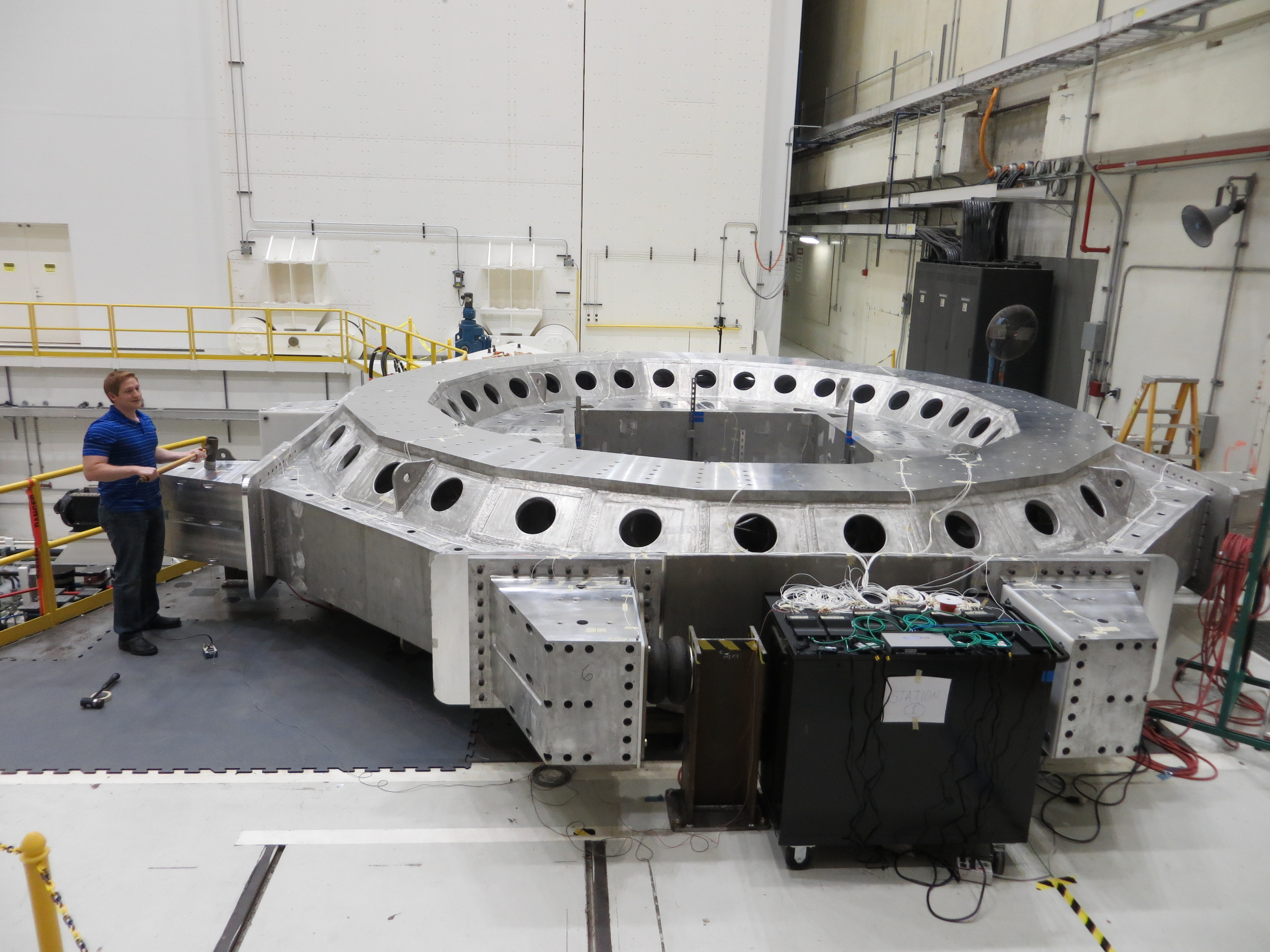
Mechanical Vibration Facility's table - modal test (free-free)

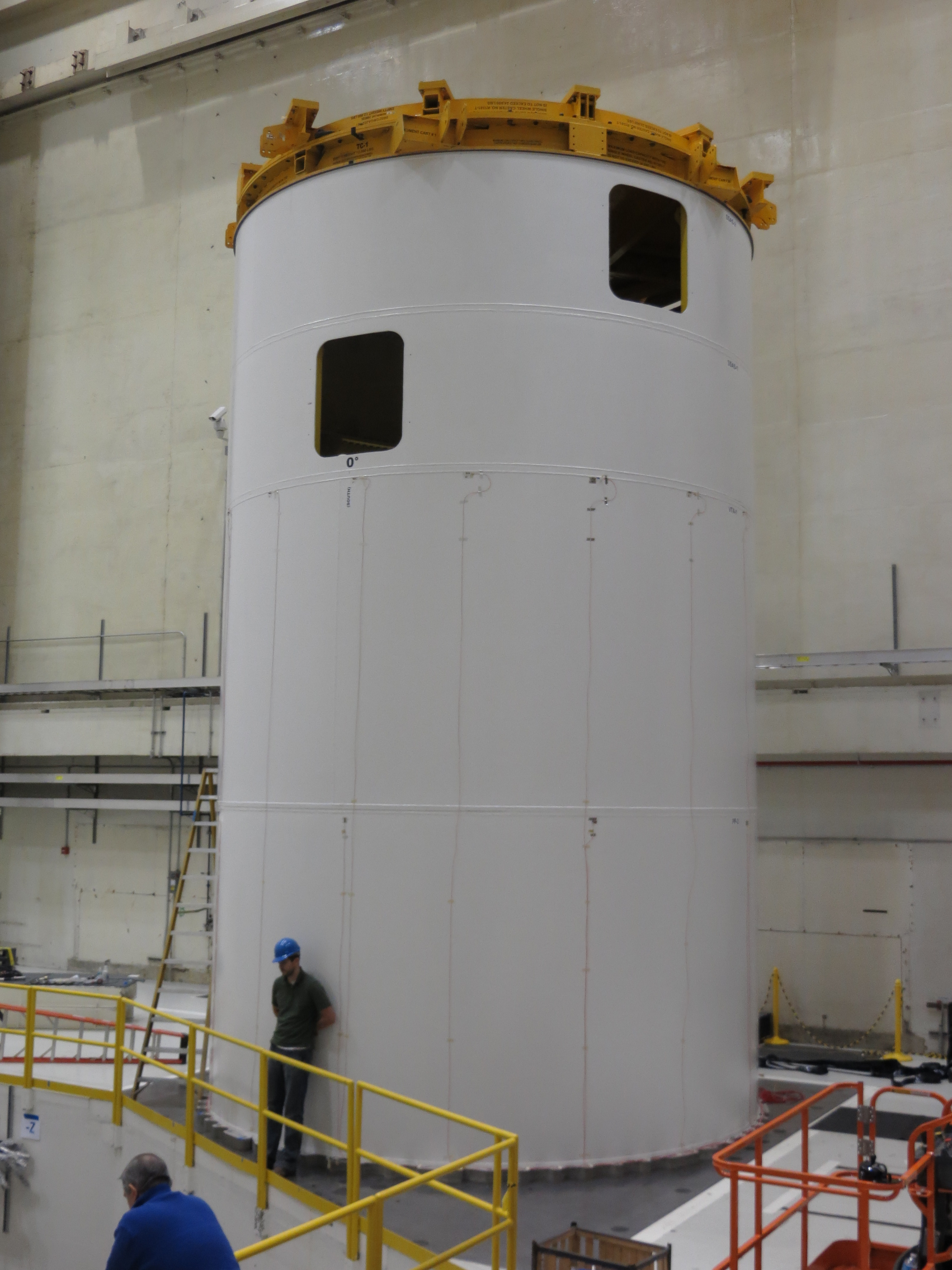
Vibration test article - modal test

== Assembly area ==
The SPF layout is ideal for performing multiple test programs. The facility has two large high bay areas adjacent to either side of the vacuum chamber. The advantage of having both areas available is that it allows for two complex tests to be prepared simultaneously. One can be prepared in a high bay while another is being conducted in the vacuum chamber. Large chamber doors provide access to the test chamber from either high bay.
