= Vacuum chamber =

Enclosure with very low air pressure used for experiments and testing

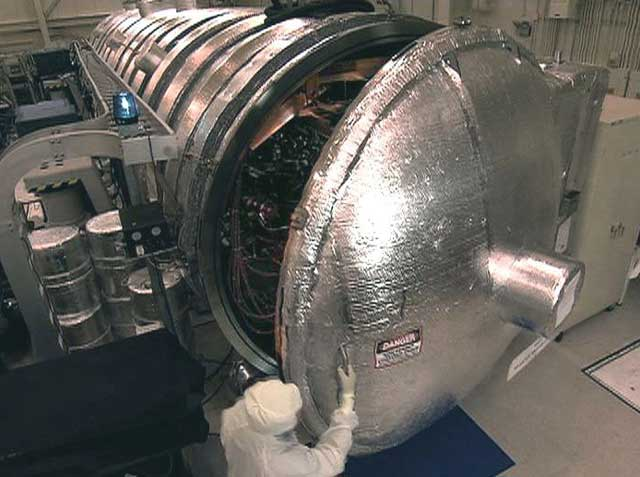
A large vacuum chamber.

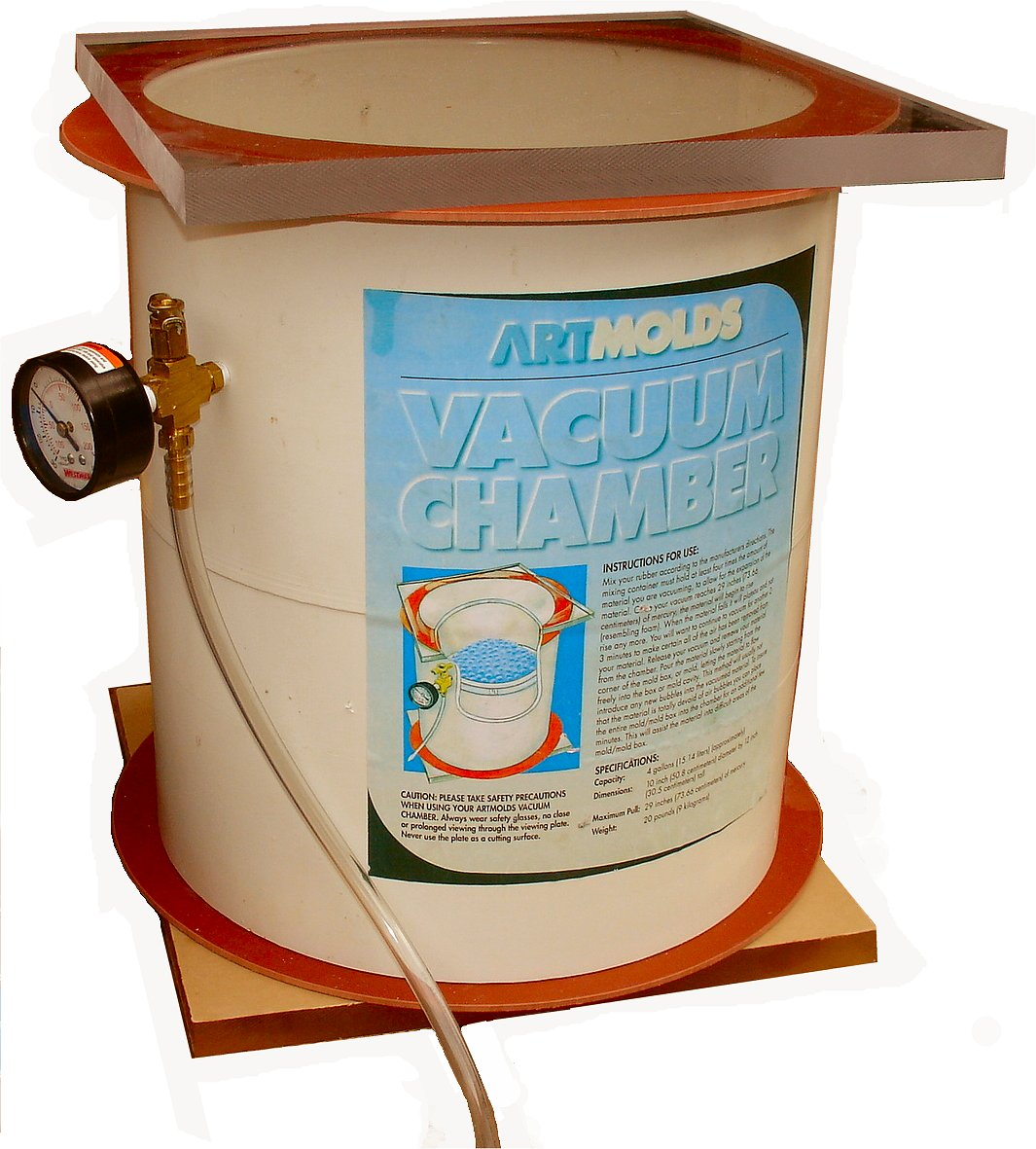
A small vacuum chamber for studio or lab use in de-airing materials such as mold rubbers and resins.

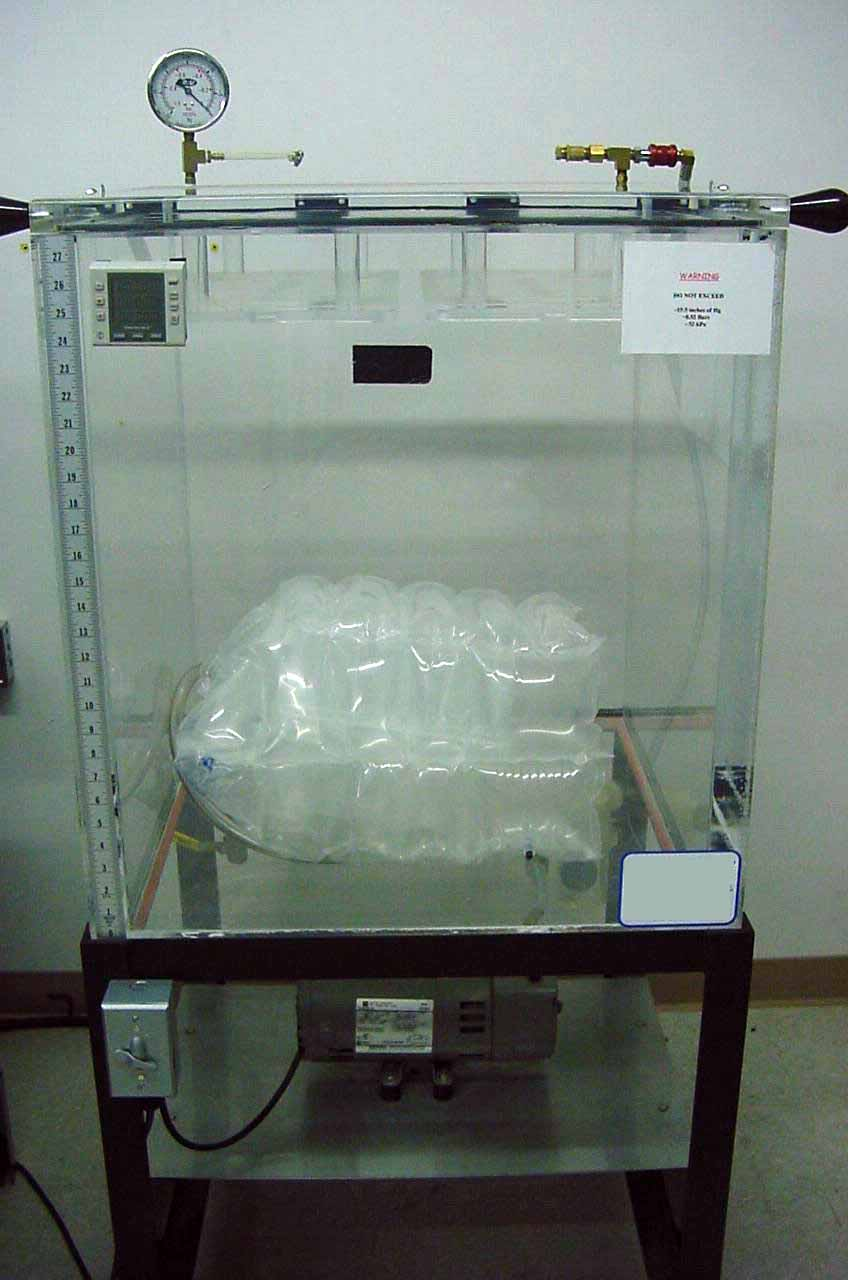
Vacuum chamber for testing leaks in packaging

A vacuum chamber is a rigid enclosure from which air and other gases are removed by a vacuum pump. This results in a low-pressure environment within the chamber, commonly referred to as a vacuum. A vacuum environment allows researchers to conduct physical experiments or to test mechanical devices which must operate in outer space (for example) or for processes such as vacuum drying or vacuum coating. Chambers are typically made of metals which may or may not shield applied external magnetic fields depending on wall thickness, frequency, resistivity, and permeability of the material used. Only some materials are suitable for vacuum use.

Chambers often have multiple ports, covered with vacuum flanges, to allow instruments or windows to be installed in the walls of the chamber. In low to medium-vacuum applications, these are sealed with elastomer o-rings. In higher vacuum applications, the flanges have knife edges machined onto them, which cut into a copper gasket when the flange is bolted on.

A type of vacuum chamber frequently used in the field of spacecraft engineering is a thermal vacuum chamber, which provides a thermal environment representing what a spacecraft would experience in space.

== Vacuum chamber materials ==
Vacuum chambers can be constructed of many materials. "Metals are arguably the most prevalent vacuum chamber materials." The strength, pressure, and permeability are considerations for selecting chamber material. Common materials are:

- Stainless steel
- Aluminum
- Mild steel
- Brass
- High density ceramic
- Glass
- Acrylic
- Hardened steel

== Vacuum degassing ==
"Vacuum degassing is the process of removing gases from compounds using vacuum which become entrapped in the mixture when mixing the components." To assure a bubble-free mold when mixing resin and silicone rubbers and slower-setting harder resins, a vacuum chamber is required. A small vacuum chamber is needed for de-airing (eliminating air bubbles) for materials prior to their setting. The process is fairly straightforward. The casting or molding material is mixed according to the manufacturer's directions.

=== Process ===
Since the material may expand 4–5 times under a vacuum, the mixing container must be large enough to hold a volume of four to five times the amount of the original material that is being vacuumed to allow for the expansion; if not, it will spill over the top of the container requiring clean-up that can be avoided. The material container is then placed into the vacuum chamber; a vacuum pump is connected and turned on. Once the vacuum reaches 29 inches (at sea level) of mercury, the material will begin to rise (resembling foam). When the material falls, it will plateau and stop rising. The vacuuming is continued for another 2 to 3 minutes to make certain all of the air has been removed from the material. Once this interval is reached, the vacuum pump is shut off and the vacuum chamber release valve is opened to equalize air pressure. The vacuum chamber is opened, the material is removed and is ready to pour into the mold.

Though a maximum vacuum one can theoretically achieve at sea level is 29.921 inches of mercury (Hg,) this will vary significantly as altitude increases. For example, in Denver, Colorado, at one mile (1.6 km) above sea level, it is only possible to achieve a vacuum on the mercury scale of 24.896 Hg.

To keep the material air-free, it must be slowly poured in a high and narrow stream starting from the corner of the mold box, or mold, letting the material flow freely into the box or mold cavity. Usually, this method will not introduce any new bubbles into the vacuumed material. To ensure that the material is totally devoid of air bubbles, the entire mold/mold box may be placed in the chamber for an additional few minutes; this will assist the material in flowing into difficult areas of the mold/mold box.

== Vacuum drying ==
Water and other liquids may accumulate on a product during the production process. "Vacuum is often employed as a process for removing bulk and absorbed water (or other solvents) from a product. Combined with heat, vacuum can be an effective method for drying."

== World's largest vacuum chamber ==
NASA's Space Power Facility houses the world's largest vacuum chamber. It was built in 1969 and stands 122 feet (37 m) high and 100 feet (30 m) in diameter, enclosing a bullet-shaped space. It was originally commissioned for nuclear-electric power studies under vacuum conditions, but was later decommissioned. Recently, it was recommissioned for use in testing spacecraft propulsion systems. Recent uses include testing the airbag landing systems for the Mars Pathfinder and the Mars Exploration Rovers, Spirit and Opportunity, under simulated Mars atmospheric conditions.

Each arm of the LIGO detectors in Livingston, Louisiana, and Hanford, Washington, is a vacuum chamber 4 kilometres (2.5 mi) long. Large Hadron Collider's ring is a tube under vacuum 27 kilometres (17 mi) long.

== See also ==
- Bell jar
- Optical window
- Thermal vacuum chamber
- Vacuum engineering
- NASA Space Power Facility
