= Variable geometry turbomachine =

A variable geometry turbomachine uses movable vanes to optimize its efficiency at different operating conditions. This article refers to movable vanes as used in liquid pumps and turbocharger turbines. It does not cover the widespread use of movable vanes in gas turbine compressors.

== Performance characteristics of turbomachines ==
If all fluid velocities at corresponding points within the turbomachine are in the same direction and proportional to the blade speed, then the operating condition of a turbomachine at two different rotational speeds will be dynamically similar. If two points, each on dissimilar head-flow characteristics curve, represent similar dynamic operation of the turbo machine, then the non-dimensional variables (ignoring Reynolds number effects) will have same values.

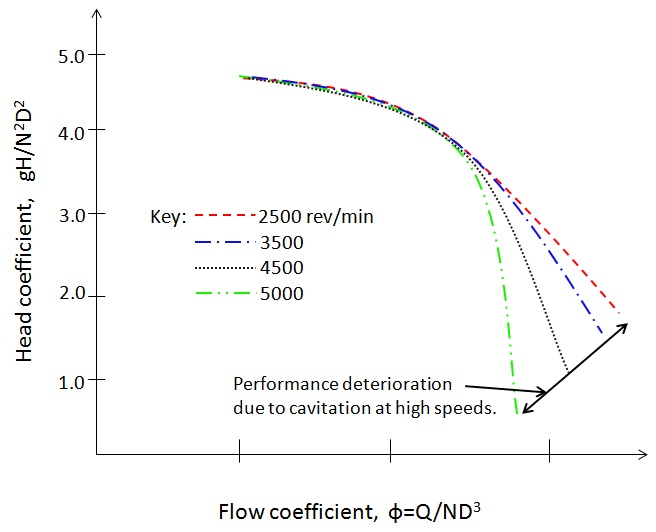
Figure 1. Dimensionless head-volume characteristics of centrifugal pump

Head coefficient

$\psi\ = f_1\!\left({Q\over{ND^3}}\right),\,$	1

Efficiency

$\eta\ = f_2\!\left({Q\over {ND^3}}\right),\,$	2

Power coefficient

$P = f_3\!\left({Q\over {ND^3}}\right),\,$	3

Where,

$N$ is speed of rotation.

$Q$ is flow rate.

$D$ is impeller diameter.

Thus non-dimensional representation is highly advantageous for converging to single performance curve that would otherwise result in multiple curves if plotted dimensionally. Figure 1 shows head characteristics of centrifugal pump versus flow coefficient. Within the normal operating range of this pump, 0.03 <Q/(ND^{3}) < 0.06, the head characteristic curves approximately coincide for different values of speed (2500 <N<5000 rev/min) and little scatter appears may be due to the effect of Reynolds number. For smaller flow co-efficient, Q/(ND^{3}) < 0.025, the flow became unsteady but dynamically similar conditions still appear i.e. head characteristic curves still coincides for different values of speed. But at high flow rates deviation from the single-curve are noticed for higher values of speed. This effect is due to cavitation, a high speed phenomenon of hydraulic machines caused by the release of vapour bubbles at low pressures. Thus during off-design operating conditions, i.e. Q/(ND^{3}) < 0.03 and Q/(ND^{3}) > 0.06, the flow become unsteady and cavitations occurs . So to avoid cavitation increase efficiency at high flow rates we resort to Variable Geometry Turbomachine.

== Fixed geometry turbomachine ==
Fixed geometry machines are designed to operate at maximum efficiency condition. The efficiency of a fixed geometry machine depends on the flow coefficient and Reynolds number. For a constant Reynolds number as flow coefficient increases, efficiency also increases, reaches a maximum value and then decreases. Thus off-design operation is completely inefficient and may result in cavitation at higher flow rates.

== Variable geometry turbomachine ==
A variable geometry turbomachine uses movable vanes to regulate the flow. Vane angles are varied using cams driven by servo motor (actuator). In large installations involving many thousands of kilowatts and where operating conditions fluctuate, sophisticated systems of control are incorporated. Thus variable geometry turbomachine offer a better match of efficiency with changing flow conditions.

Figure 2 describes the envelope of optimum efficiency for a variable geometry turbomachine. In the figure each of curves $(a, b\, and\, c)$ represents different fixed geometry machines. The efficiency of the variable geometry turbomachine intersects the point of maximum efficiency for each of the curves $(a, b\, and\, c)$.

As the vane angles are variable in Variable Geometry Turbomachine, therefore we introduce an additional variable $\beta$ into equation 1 and 2 to represent the setting of the vanes. We can write:

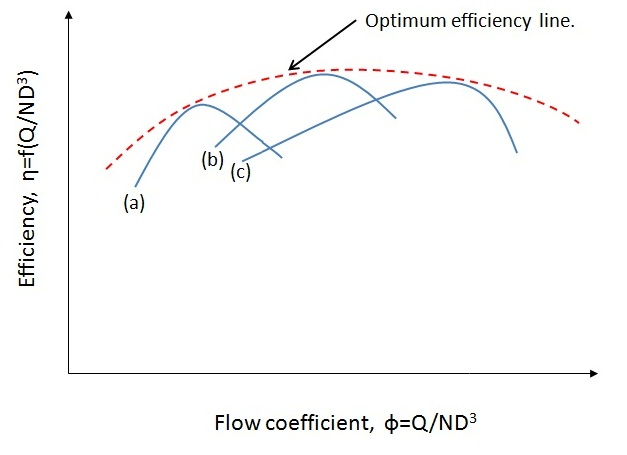
Figure 2. Different efficiency curves for a given machine obtained with various blade settings.

$\psi\ = f_4(\phi,\beta),\,$

$\eta\ = f_5(\phi,\beta),\,$

Where, flow coefficient, $\phi\ = \!\left({Q\over{ND^3}}\right).\,$

Alternatively, with

$\beta\ = f_6(\psi,\phi),\,$

$\beta\ = f_7(\eta,\phi),\,$

$\beta$ can be eliminated to give a new functional dependence:

$\eta\ = f_8(\phi,\psi)= f_8\!\left({Q\over{ND^3}},{gH\over{N^2D^2}}\right).\,$

Thus, efficiency in a variable geometry pump is a function of both flow coefficient and energy transfer coefficient.

== Applications ==
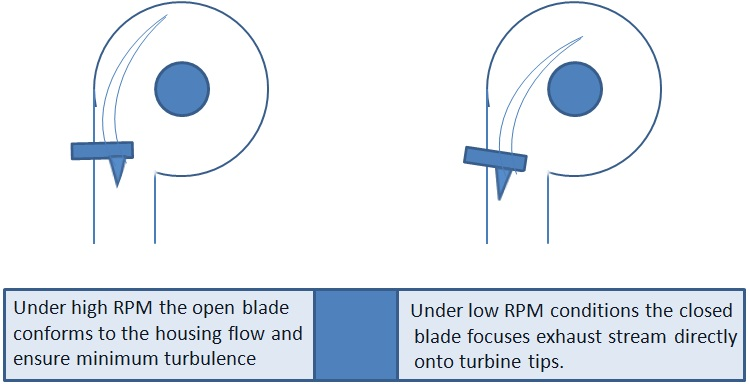
Figure 3. Different vane configuration

Variable Geometry Turbomachine technology is used in turbocharger of diesel engines, where the turbo has variable vanes which control the flow of exhaust onto the turbine blades. A Variable Geometry Turbocharger has movable vanes which direct the flow of exhaust onto the turbine blades. Actuators are used to adjust the vane angles. Angle of vanes vary throughout the range of RPM to optimize turbine behaviour. At high engine speed, vanes are fully open and the exhaust is fully directed onto the turbine blades. At low engine speeds vanes are almost closed creating a narrow passage for the exhaust. This accelerates the exhaust towards the turbine blades, making them spin faster.

== See also ==
- Supercharger.
- Variable-geometry turbocharger.
