= List of Launch Services Program launches =

The launch history of NASA's Launch Services Program (LSP) since the program formed in 1998 at Kennedy Space Center. The launch of NASA robotic missions occurred from a number of launch sites on a variety of rockets. After the list of launches are descriptions of select historic LSP missions.

The official list is available on the NASA website at LSP Primary Launches Archive. It does not include advisory or VADR missions included below.

== Launch history ==
The table below is a complete history of the NASA robotic spacecraft launched by the Launch Services Program. The dates are relative to the launch site and may not match the UTC date.

+	LSP Advisory Mission
*	The total cost for NASA to launch the mission includes the launch service, spacecraft processing, payload integration, tracking, data and telemetry, mission unique launch site ground support, and other launch support requirements. All costs listed are approximate. Some spacecraft were awarded as a group, which is why their cost is listed as 1 of a number of spacecraft. Unless the reference specifies otherwise, the value is at award (i.e. when the launch service contract is signed) and does not account for additional costs due to delays and other factors or any cost savings that may have occurred later.

=== 1990s ===
Launch Date	Mission	Vehicle	Launch Site	Total Launch Cost* (million)
1998
1998.10.24	Deep Space 1	Delta II 7326-9.5	Cape Canaveral Air Force Station Space Launch Complex 17 (CCAFS SLC 17A)	
1998.12.06	Submillimeter Wave Astronomy Satellite (SWAS)	Pegasus XL	Vandenberg Air Force Base (VAFB)	
1998.12.11	Mars Climate Orbiter	Delta II 7425	Cape Canaveral Air Force Station Space Launch Complex 17 (CCAFS SLC 17A)	
1999
1999.01.03	Mars Polar Lander	Delta II 7425	Cape Canaveral Air Force Station Space Launch Complex 17 (CCAFS SLC 17B)	
1999.02.07	Stardust	Delta II 7426	Cape Canaveral Air Force Station Space Launch Complex 17 (CCAFS SLC 17A)	
1999.03.04	Wide Field Infrared Explorer (WIRE)	Pegasus XL	Vandenberg Air Force Base (VAFB)	
1999.04.15	Landsat 7	Delta II 7920-10	Vandenberg AFB Space Launch Complex 2 West (VAFB SLC-2W)	
1999.05.18	TERRIERS/Multiple Paths, Beyond-Line-of-Sight Communications (MUBLCOM)	Pegasus XL	Vandenberg Air Force Base (VAFB)	
1999.06.20	QuikSCAT (Quick Scatterometer)	Titan II	Vandenberg AFB Space Launch Complex 4 West (VAFB SLC-4W)	
1999.06.24	Far Ultraviolet Spectroscopic Explorer (FUSE)	Delta II 7320-10	Cape Canaveral Air Force Station Space Launch Complex 17 (CCAFS SLC 17A)	
1999.12.18	Terra	Atlas II-AS	Vandenberg AFB Space Launch Complex 3 East (VAFB SLC-3E)	

=== 2000s ===
Launch Date	Mission	Vehicle	Launch Site	Total Launch Cost* (million)
2000
2000.03.25	Imager for Magnetopause-to-Aurora Global Exploration (IMAGE)	Delta II 7326-9.5	Vandenberg AFB Space Launch Complex 2 West (VAFB SLC-2W)	
2000.05.03	Geostationary Operational Environmental Satellite-L (GOES-L)	Atlas II-A	Cape Canaveral Air Force Station Space Launch Complex 36A (CCAFS SLC-36A)	
2000.06.30	Tracking and Data Relay Satellite-H (TDRS-H)	Atlas II-A	Cape Canaveral Air Force Station Space Launch Complex 36B (CCAFS SLC-36B)	
2000.09.21	National Oceanic and Atmospheric Administration-L (NOAA-L)	Titan II	Vandenberg AFB Space Launch Complex 4 West (VAFB SLC-4W)	
2000.10.09	High Energy Transient Explorer-2 (HETE-2)	Pegasus XL	Reagan Test Site, Kwajalein Atoll	$0.10 (min); 1 of 16 for $400 max
2000.11.21	Earth Observing-1 (EO-1)/ SAC-C	Delta II 7320-10	Vandenberg AFB Space Launch Complex 2 West (VAFB SLC-2W)	
2001
2001.04.07	2001 Mars Odyssey	Delta II 7925	Cape Canaveral Air Force Station Space Launch Complex 17 (CCAFS SLC 17)	
2001.06.30	Wilkinson Microwave Anisotropy Probe (WMAP)	Delta II 7425	Cape Canaveral Air Force Station Space Launch Complex 17 (CCAFS SLC 17)	
2001.07.23	Geostationary Operational Environmental Satellite-M (GOES-M)	Atlas II	Cape Canaveral Air Force Station Space Launch Complex 36 (CCAFS SLC-36)	
2001.08.08	Genesis	Delta II 7326-9.5	Cape Canaveral Air Force Station Space Launch Complex 17 (CCAFS SLC 17A)	
2001.09.29	Kodiak Star	Athena I	Kodiak Island	
2001.12.07	Jason-1/Thermosphere Ionosphere Mesosphere Energetics and Dynamics (TIMED)	Delta II 7920-10	Vandenberg AFB Space Launch Complex 2 West (VAFB SLC-2W)	
2002
2002.02.05	Reuven Ramaty High Energy Solar Spectroscopic Imager (RHESSI)	Pegasus XL	Cape Canaveral Air Force Station (CCAFS)	$0.10 (min); 1 of 16 for $400 max
2002.03.08	Tracking and Data Relay Satellite TDRS-I	Atlas II-A	Cape Canaveral Air Force Station Space Launch Complex 36A (CCAFS SLC-36A)	
2002.05.04	AQUA (EOS PM-1)	Delta II 7920-10L	Vandenberg AFB Space Launch Complex 2 West (VAFB SLC-2W)	
2002.06.24	National Oceanic and Atmospheric Administration-M (NOAA-M)	Titan II	Vandenberg AFB Space Launch Complex 4 (VAFB SLC-4W)	
2002.07.03	COmet Nucleus TOUR (CONTOUR)	Delta II 7425	Cape Canaveral Air Force Station Space Launch Complex 17 (CCAFS SLC 17A)	
2002.12.04	Tracking and Data Relay Satellite TDRS-J	Atlas II-A	Cape Canaveral Air Force Station Space Launch Complex 36A (CCAFS SLC-36A)	
2003
2003.01.12	Ice, Cloud, and land Elevation Satellite (ICESat) /Cosmic Hot Interstellar Plasma Spectrometer satellite (CHIPSat)	Delta II 7320-10	Vandenberg AFB Space Launch Complex 2 West (VAFB SLC-2W)	
2003.01.25	Solar Radiation and Climate Experiment (SORCE)	Pegasus XL	Cape Canaveral Air Force Station (CCAFS)	$0.10 (min); 1 of 16 for $400 max
2003.04.28	Galaxy Evolution Explorer (GALEX)	Pegasus XL	Cape Canaveral Air Force Station (CCAFS)	$0.10 (min); 1 of 16 for $400 max
2003.06.10	Mars Exploration Rover – A (MER-A) Spirit Rover	Delta II 7925-9.5	Cape Canaveral Air Force Station Space Launch Complex 17 (CCAFS SLC 17A)	
2003.07.07	Mars Exploration Rover – B (MER-B) Opportunity Rover	Delta II Heavy 7925H-9.5	Cape Canaveral Air Force Station Space Launch Complex 17 (CCAFS SLC 17B)	
2003.08.12	SCISAT-1	Pegasus XL	Vandenberg Air Force Base (VAFB)	$0.10 (min); 1 of 16 for $400 max
2003.08.25	Spitzer Space Telescope (formerly the Space Infrared Telescope Facility (SIRTF))	Delta II Heavy 7920H-9.5	Cape Canaveral Air Force Station Space Launch Complex 17 (CCAFS SLC 17)	
2004
2004.04.20	Gravity Probe B (GP-B)	Delta II 7920-10C	Vandenberg AFB Space Launch Complex 2 West (VAFB SLC-2W)	
2004.07.15	Aura (EOS CH-1)	Delta II 7920-10L	Vandenberg AFB Space Launch Complex 2 West (VAFB SLC-2W)	
2004.08.03	MErcury Surface, Space ENvironment, GEochemistry and Ranging (MESSENGER)	Delta II Heavy 7925H-9.5	Cape Canaveral Air Force Station Space Launch Complex 17 (CCAFS SLC 17)	
2004.11.20	Swift Gamma-Ray Burst Mission (Swift)	Delta II 7320-10C	Cape Canaveral Air Force Station Space Launch Complex 17 (CCAFS SLC 17)	
2005				
2005.01.12	Deep Impact	Delta II 7925-9.5	Cape Canaveral Air Force Station Space Launch Complex 17 (CCAFS SLC 17)	
2005.04.15	Demonstration for Autonomous Rendezvous Technology (DART)	Pegasus XL	Vandenberg Air Force Base (VAFB)	
2005.05.20	National Oceanic and Atmospheric Administration-N (NOAA-N)	Delta II 7320-10C	Vandenberg AFB Space Launch Complex 2 West (VAFB SLC-2W)	
2005.08.12	Mars Reconnaissance Orbiter (MRO)	Atlas V 401	Cape Canaveral Air Force Station Space Launch Complex 41 (CCAFS SLC-41)	
2006				
2006.01.19	New Horizons (Pluto)	Atlas V 551 + Star 48B	Cape Canaveral Air Force Station Space Launch Complex 41 (CCAFS SLC-41)	
2006.03.22	Space Technology 5 (ST-5)	Pegasus XL	Vandenberg Air Force Base (VAFB)	
2006.04.28	CloudSat/Cloud-Aerosol Lidar and Infrared Pathfinder Satellite Observations (CALIPSO)	Delta II 7420-10C	Vandenberg AFB Space Launch Complex 2 West (VAFB SLC-2W)	1 of 19 for $1200
2006.10.25	Solar TErrestrial RElations Observatory (STEREO)	Delta II 7925-10L	Cape Canaveral Air Force Station Space Launch Complex 17 (CCAFS SLC 17)	1 of 19 for $1200
2007				
2007.02.17	Time History of Events and Macroscale Interactions during Substorms (THEMIS)	Delta II 7925-10C	Cape Canaveral Air Force Station Space Launch Complex 17 (CCAFS SLC 17)	1 of 19 for $1200
2007.04.25	Aeronomy of Ice in the Mesosphere (AIM)	Pegasus XL	Vandenberg Air Force Base (VAFB)	
2007.08.04	Phoenix	Delta II 7925	Cape Canaveral Air Force Station Space Launch Complex 17 (CCAFS SLC 17)	1 of 19 for $1200
2007.09.27	Dawn	Delta II Heavy 7925H-9.5	Cape Canaveral Air Force Station Space Launch Complex 17 (CCAFS SLC 17)	1 of 19 for $1200
2008				
2008.06.11	Fermi Gamma-ray Space Telescope (formerly GLAST)	Delta II Heavy 7920H-10C	Cape Canaveral Air Force Station Space Launch Complex 17 (CCAFS SLC 17)	1 of 19 for $1200
2008.06.20	Ocean Surface Topography Mission (OSTM)/Jason-2	Delta II 7320	Vandenberg AFB Space Launch Complex 2 West (VAFB SLC-2W)	1 of 19 for $1200
2008.10.19	Interstellar Boundary Explorer (IBEX)	Pegasus XL	Reagan Test Site, Kwajalein Atoll	
2009				
2009.02.06	National Oceanic and Atmospheric Administration-N Prime (NOAA-N Prime)	Delta II 7320-10C	Vandenberg AFB Space Launch Complex 2 West (VAFB SLC-2W)	1 of 19 for $1200
2009.02.24	Orbiting Carbon Observatory (OCO) [launch failure]	Taurus XL	Vandenberg AFB Launch Complex 576 (VAFB LC-576)	
2009.03.06	Kepler	Delta II 7925-10L	Cape Canaveral Air Force Station Space Launch Complex 17 (CCAFS SLC 17)	1 of 19 for $1200
2009.05.05	Space Tracking and Surveillance System Advanced Technology Risk Reduction (STSS-ATRR)	Delta II 7920-10C	Vandenberg AFB Space Launch Complex 2 West (VAFB SLC-2W)	1 of 19 for $1200
2009.06.18	Lunar Reconnaissance Orbiter (LRO)/Lunar Crater Observation and Sensing Satellite (LCROSS)	Atlas V 401	Cape Canaveral Air Force Station Space Launch Complex 41 (CCAFS SLC-41)	$136.2
2009.09.25	Space Tracking and Surveillance System (STSS)-Demonstrators Program	Delta II 7920-10C	Cape Canaveral Air Force Station Space Launch Complex 17 (CCAFS SLC 17)	1 of 19 for $1200
2009.12.14	Wide-field Infrared Survey Explorer (WISE)	Delta II 7320-10C	Vandenberg AFB Space Launch Complex 2 West (VAFB SLC-2W)	1 of 19 for $1200

=== 2010s ===
Launch Date	Mission	Vehicle	Launch Site	Total Launch Cost* (million)
2010
2010.02.11	Solar Dynamics Observatory (SDO)	Atlas V 401	Cape Canaveral Air Force Station Space Launch Complex 41 (CCAFS SLC-41)	
2011
2011.03.04	Glory [launch failure]	Taurus XL	Vandenberg AFB Launch Complex 576 (VAFB LC-576)	
2011.06.09	Aquarius (SAC-D)	Delta II 7320	Vandenberg AFB Space Launch Complex 2 West (VAFB SLC-2W)	1 of 19 for $1200
2011.08.05	Juno	Atlas V 551	Cape Canaveral Air Force Station Space Launch Complex 41 (CCAFS SLC-41)	$190
2011.09.10	Gravity Recovery and Interior Laboratory (GRAIL)	Delta II 7920-H	Cape Canaveral Air Force Station Space Launch Complex 17 (CCAFS SLC-17)	1 of 19 for $1200
2011.10.28	NPOESS Preparatory Project (NPP)	Delta II 7920-10	Vandenberg AFB Space Launch Complex 2 West (VAFB SLC-2W)	1 of 19 for $1200
2011.11.26	Mars Science Laboratory (MSL)	Atlas V 541	Cape Canaveral Air Force Station Space Launch Complex 41 (CCAFS SLC-41)	$194.7
2012
2012.06.13	Nuclear Spectroscopic Telescope Array (NuSTAR)	Pegasus XL	Reagan Test Site, Kwajalein Atoll	$36
2012.08.30	Radiation Belt Storm Probes (RBSP)	Atlas V-401	Cape Canaveral Air Force Station Space Launch Complex 41 (CCAFS SLC-41)	1 of 4 for $600
2012.10.07	SpaceX-1 Commercial Resupply Services flight (SpX-1) +	Falcon 9	Cape Canaveral Air Force Station Space Launch Complex 40 (CCAFS SLC-40)	1 of 12 for $1600
2013
2013.01.30	Tracking and Data Relay Satellite-K (TDRS-K)	Atlas V-401	Cape Canaveral Air Force Station Space Launch Complex 41 (CCAFS SLC-41)	1 of 4 for $600
2013.02.11	Landsat Data Continuity Mission (LDCM)	Atlas V-401	Vandenberg Air Force Base Space Launch Complex 3 East (VAFB SLC-3E)	$124
2013.03.01	SpaceX-2 Commercial Resupply Services flight (SpX-2/CRS-2) +	Falcon 9	Cape Canaveral Air Force Station Space Launch Complex 40 (CCAFS SLC-40)	1 of 12 for $1600
2013.04.21	Orbital Sciences Corporation Demo C-1 +	Antares	Wallops Flight Facility (WFF)	
2013.06.27	Interface Region Imaging Spectrograph (IRIS)	Pegasus XL	Vandenberg Air Force Base (VAFB)	$40
2013.09.06	Lunar Atmosphere and Dust Environment Explorer (LADEE) +	Minotaur V	Wallops Flight Facility (WFF)	
2013.09.18	Orbital Sciences Corporation Demo C-1 [NASA Commercial Orbital Transportation Services: Info only (Managed by Johnson Space Center)]	Antares	Wallops Flight Facility (WFF)	
2013.11.18	Mars Atmosphere and Volatile EvolutioN (MAVEN)	Atlas V-401	Cape Canaveral Air Force Station Space Launch Complex 41 (CCAFS SLC-41)	$187
2014
2014.01.09	Orbital-1 Commercial Resupply Services (Orb-1) + Includes LSP's SPHERES-Slosh Experiment	Antares/Cygnus	Wallops Flight Facility (WFF)	1 of 8 for $1900
2014.01.23	Tracking and Data Relay Satellite-L (TDRS-L)	Atlas V-401	Cape Canaveral Air Force Station Space Launch Complex 41 (CCAFS SLC-41)	1 of 4 for $600
2014.02.27	Global Precipitation Measurement (GPM) Core+	H-IIA	Tanegashima Space Center	
2014.04.18	SpaceX-3 Commercial Resupply Services flight (SpX-3/CRS-3) +	Falcon 9 / Dragon	Cape Canaveral Air Force Station Space Launch Complex 40 (CCAFS SLC-40)	1 of 12 for $1600
2014.07.02	Orbiting Carbon Observatory-2 (OCO-2)	Delta II 7320	Vandenberg Air Force Base Space Launch Complex 2 West (VAFB SLC-2W)	$70
2014.07.13	Orbital-2 Commercial Resupply Services (Orb-2) +	Antares/Cygnus	Wallops Flight Facility (WFF)	1 of 8 for $1900
2014.09.21	SpaceX-4 Commercial Resupply Services flight (SpX-4/CRS-4) +	Falcon 9 / Dragon	Cape Canaveral Air Force Station Space Launch Complex 40 (CCAFS SLC-40)	1 of 12 for $1600
2014.10.28	Orbital-3 Commercial Resupply Services (Orb-3) + [launch failure]	Antares/Cygnus	Wallops Flight Facility (WFF)	1 of 8 for $1900
2015
2015.01.10	SpaceX-5 Commercial Resupply Services flight (SpX-5/CRS-5) +	Falcon 9 / Dragon	Cape Canaveral Air Force Station Space Launch Complex 40 (CCAFS SLC-40)	1 of 12 for $1600
2015.01.31	Soil Moisture Active Passive (SMAP)	Delta II 7320	Vandenberg Air Force Base Space Launch Complex 2 West (VAFB SLC-2W)	1 of 3 for $412
2015.03.12	Magnetospheric Multiscale Mission (MMS)	Atlas V-421	Cape Canaveral Air Force Station Space Launch Complex 41 (CCAFS SLC-41)	1 of 4 for $600
2015.04.14	SpaceX-6 Commercial Resupply Services flight (SpX-6/CRS-6) +	Falcon 9 / Dragon	Cape Canaveral Air Force Station Space Launch Complex 40 (CCAFS SLC-40)	1 of 12 for $1600
2015.06.28	SpaceX-7 Commercial Resupply Services flight (SpX-7/CRS-7) + [launch failure]	Falcon 9 / Dragon	Cape Canaveral Air Force Station Space Launch Complex 40 (CCAFS SLC-40)	1 of 12 for $1600
2015.12.06	Orbital-4 Commercial Resupply Services (Orb-4) +	Atlas V-401/Cygnus	Cape Canaveral Air Force Station Space Launch Complex 41 (CCAFS SLC-41)	1 of 8 for $1900
2016
2016.01.17	Jason-3 (NOAA mission)	Falcon 9 v1.1	Vandenberg Air Force Base Space Launch Complex 4 East (VAFB SLC-4E)	$82
2016.03.23	Orbital ATK-6 Commercial Resupply Services (OA-6) +	Atlas V-401/Cygnus	Cape Canaveral Air Force Station Space Launch Complex 41 (CCAFS SLC-41)	1 of 8 for $1900
2016.04.08	SpaceX-8 Commercial Resupply Services flight (SpX-8/CRS-8) +	Falcon 9 / Dragon	Cape Canaveral Air Force Station Space Launch Complex 40 (CCAFS SLC-40)	1 of 12 for $1600
2016.09.08	Origins Spectral Interpretation Resource Identification Security Regolith Explorer (OSIRIS-REx)	Atlas V-411	Cape Canaveral Air Force Station Space Launch Complex 41 (CCAFS SLC-41)	$183.5
2016.10.17	Orbital ATK-5 Commercial Resupply Services (OA-5) +	Antares/Cygnus	Wallops Flight Facility (WFF)	1 of 8 for $1900
2016.11.19	Geostationary Operational Environmental Satellite-R (GOES-R)	Atlas V-541	Cape Canaveral Air Force Station Space Launch Complex 41 (CCAFS SLC-41)	1 of 2 for $446
2016.12.15	Cyclone Global Navigation Satellite System (CYGNSS)	Pegasus XL	Cape Canaveral Air Force Station (CCAFS)	$55
2017
2017.02.19	SpaceX-10 Commercial Resupply Services flight (SpX-10/CRS-10) +	Falcon 9	Kennedy Space Center Launch Complex 39A (CCAFS SLC-39A)	1 of 12 for $1600
2017.04.18	Orbital ATK-7 Commercial Resupply Services (OA-7) +	Atlas V-401/Cygnus	Cape Canaveral Air Force Station Space Launch Complex 41 (CCAFS SLC-41)	1 of 8 for $1900
2017.06.03	SpaceX-11 Commercial Resupply Services flight (SpX-11/CRS-11) +	Falcon 9	Kennedy Space Center Launch Complex 39A (CCAFS SLC-39A)	1 of 12 for $1600
2017.08.14	SpaceX-12 Commercial Resupply Services flight (SpX-12/CRS-12) +	Falcon 9	Kennedy Space Center Launch Complex 39A (CCAFS SLC-39A)	1 of 12 for $1600
2017.08.18	Tracking and Data Relay Satellite-M (TDRS-M)	Atlas V-401	Cape Canaveral Air Force Station Space Launch Complex 41 (CCAFS SLC-41)	$132.4
2017.11.12	Orbital ATK-8 Commercial Resupply Services (OA-8/CRS-8) +	Antares/Cygnus	Wallops Flight Facility (WFF)	1 of 8 for $1900
2017.11.18	Joint Polar Satellite System-1 (JPSS-1) & ELaNa XIV	Delta II 7920-10	Vandenberg Air Force Base Space Launch Complex 2 West (VAFB SLC-2W)	3 of 3 for $412
2017.12.15	SpaceX-13 Commercial Resupply Services flight (SpX-13/CRS-13) +	Falcon 9	Cape Canaveral Air Force Station Space Launch Complex 40 (CCAFS SLC-40)	
2018
2018.03.01	Geostationary Operational Environmental Satellite-S (GOES-S)	Atlas V-541	Cape Canaveral Air Force Station Space Launch Complex 41 (CCAFS SLC-41)	1 of 2 for $446
2018.04.02	SpaceX-14 Commercial Resupply Services flight (SpX-14/CRS-14) +	Falcon 9	Cape Canaveral Air Force Station Space Launch Complex 40 (CCAFS SLC-40)	
2018.04.18	Transiting Exoplanet Survey Satellite (TESS)	Falcon 9	Cape Canaveral Air Force Station Space Launch Complex 40 (CCAFS SLC-40)	$87
2018.05.05	Interior Exploration using Seismic Investigations, Geodesy and Heat Transport (InSight) [Mars Lander]	Atlas V-401	Vandenberg Air Force Base Space Launch Complex 3 East (VAFB SLC-3E)	$160
2018.05.22	Gravity Recovery and Climate Experiment Follow On (GRACE-FO) +	Falcon 9	Vandenberg Air Force Base Space Launch Complex 4 East (VAFB SLC-4E)	
2018.08.12	Parker Solar Probe (PSP)	Delta IV Heavy + Star 48BV	Cape Canaveral Air Force Station Space Launch Complex 37 (CCAFS SLC-37)	$389.1
2018.09.15	Ice, Cloud, and land Elevation Satellite 2 (ICESat-2)	Delta II 7420	Vandenberg Air Force Base Space Launch Complex 2 West (VAFB SLC-2W)	$96.6
2018.12.16	ELaNa XIX & Venture Class Launch Services (VCLS)	Electron	Rocket Lab LC-1	$6.9
2019
2019.10.10	Ionospheric Connection Explorer (ICON)	Pegasus XL	Cape Canaveral Air Force Station	$56.3

=== 2020s ===
Launch Date	Mission	Vehicle	Launch Site	Total Launch Cost* (million)
2020				
2020.02.09	Solar Orbiter	Atlas V-411	Cape Canaveral Air Force Station Space Launch Complex 41 (CCAFS SLC-41)	$172.7
2020.07.30	Mars 2020	Atlas V-541	Cape Canaveral Air Force Station Space Launch Complex 41 (CCAFS SLC-41)	$243
2020.11.21	Sentinel-6A	Falcon 9	Vandenberg Air Force Base Space Launch Complex 4 East (VAFB SLC-4E)	$97
2021				
2021.09.27	Landsat-9	Atlas V-401	Vandenberg Space Force Base Space Launch Complex 3 East (VSFB SLC-3E)	$153.8
2021.10.16	Lucy	Atlas V-401	Cape Canaveral Space Force Station Space Launch Complex 41 (CCSFS SLC-41)	$148.3
2021.11.24	Double Asteroid Redirection Test (DART)	Falcon 9	Vandenberg Space Force Base Space Launch Complex 4 East (VSFB SLC-4E)	$69
2021.12.09	Imaging X-ray Polarimetry Explorer (IXPE)	Falcon 9	Kennedy Space Center Launch Complex 39 (CCSFS SLC-39A)	$50.3
2021.12.25	James Webb Space Telescope (JWST)+	Ariane 5 ECA	Guiana Space Centre ELA-3	
2022				
2022.03.01	Geostationary Operational Environmental Satellite-T (GOES-T)	Atlas V-541	Cape Canaveral Space Force Station Space Launch Complex 41 (CCSFS SLC-41)	$165.7
2022.06.12	Time-Resolved Observations of Precipitation structure and storm Intensity with a Constellation of Smallsats (TROPICS-1) [launch failure]	Rocket 3.3	Cape Canaveral Space Launch Complex 46 (SLC-46)	$7.95
2022.06.28	Cislunar Autonomous Positioning System Technology Operations and Navigation Experiment (CAPSTONE)	Electron	Rocket Lab Launch Complex 1 (LC-1B)	$9.95
2022.11.10	Joint Polar Satellite System-2 (JPSS-2) & Low-Earth Orbit Flight Test of an Inflatable Decelerator (LOFTID)	Atlas V-401	Vandenberg Space Force Base Space Launch Complex 3 East (VSFB SLC-3E)	$170.6
2022.12.16	Surface Water Ocean Topography Mission (SWOT)	Falcon 9	Vandenberg Space Force Base Space Launch Complex 4 East (VSFB SLC-4E)	$112
2023				
2023.05.08	Time-Resolved Observations of Precipitation structure and storm Intensity with a Constellation of Smallsats (TROPICS-2)	Electron	Rocket Lab Launch Complex 1 (LC-1B)	VADR award
2023.05.26	Time-Resolved Observations of Precipitation structure and storm Intensity with a Constellation of Smallsats (TROPICS-3)	Electron	Rocket Lab Launch Complex 1 (LC-1B)	VADR award
2023.10.13	Psyche	Falcon Heavy	Kennedy Space Center Launch Complex 39A	$117
2024				
2024.02.08	Plankton, Aerosol, Cloud, ocean Ecosystem (PACE)	Falcon 9	Cape Canaveral Space Force Station	$80.4
2024.05.24 and 2024.06.05	Polar Radiant Energy in the Far-InfraRed Experiment (PREFIRE)	Electron	Rocket Lab Launch Complex 1 (LC-1B)	VADR award
2024.06.25	Geostationary Operational Environmental Satellite-U (GOES-U)	Falcon Heavy	Kennedy Space Center Launch Complex 39 (KSC LC-39A)	$152.5
2024.10.14	Europa Clipper	Falcon Heavy	Kennedy Space Center Launch Complex 39 (KSC LC-39A)	$178
2025				
2025.03.11	Spectro-Photometer for the History of the Universe, Epoch of Reionization, and Ices Explore (SPHEREx) & Polarimeter to Unify the Corona and Heliosphere (PUNCH)	Falcon 9	Vandenberg Space Force Base Space Launch Complex 4 East (VSFB SLC-4E)	$98.8
2025.07.23	Tandem Reconnection and Cusp Electrodynamics Reconnaissance Satellites (TRACERS)	Falcon 9		VADR Award
2025.07.30	NASA-ISRO Synthetic Aperture Radar (NI-SAR)+	Geosynchronous Satellite Launch Vehicle (GSLV) Mark II	Satish Dhawan Space Centre	
2025.09.24	Interstellar Mapping and Acceleration Probe (IMAP) with Space Weather Follow On-Lagrange 1 (SWFO-L1) & Carruthers Geocorona Observatory	Falcon 9	Cape Canaveral Space Force Station Space Launch Complex 40 (CCSFS SLC-40)	$109.4
2025.11.13	EscaPADE	New Glenn	Cape Canaveral Launch Complex 36 (CCSFS LC-36)	VADR award
2025.11.16	Sentinel-6B	Falcon 9	Vandenberg Space Force Base Space Launch Complex 4 East (VSFB SLC-4E)	$94
2026				
2026.01.11	Pandora with Twilight commercial rideshare mission	Falcon 9	Vandenberg Space Force Base Space Launch Complex 4 East (VSFB SLC-4E)	VADR Award
2026.08.30	Nancy Grace Roman Space Telescope (RST, formerly WFIRST)	Falcon Heavy	Kennedy Space Center Launch Complex 39 (KSC LC-39A)	$255

== Historic missions ==
Below are descriptions of historic NASA missions launched by the Launch Services Program.

Mars Exploration Rovers (MER-A & B) (Delta II)

NASA's Mars Exploration Rovers launched aboard Delta II vehicles from CCAFS. MER-A "Spirit" launched June 2003, and MER-B "Opportunity" launched July 7 that same year. Both rovers reached Mars in January 2004. Information sent back to Earth from the rovers revealed the existence of water in the Red Planet's past (now ice). Previous missions to Mars include the 2001 Mars Odyssey spacecraft that launched in 2001.

The Mars Pathfinder began its journey as NASA's first return to Mars after the Viking mission began with the launch of the Mars Global Surveyor in 1996, scheduled to last two years. The Surveyor traveled to the Red Planet and spent about two years mapping the Martian surface to achieve a global portrait then continued to work, so NASA extended its mission and used it as a communications satellite to relay data from the Mars Odyssey as well as the Spirit and Opportunity twins back to Earth.

Kepler, Deep Impact, MESSENGER (Delta II)

The Kepler mission, the 10th in NASA's Discovery missions, launched on a Delta II rocket, in 2009. The Kepler telescope was specifically designed to survey a portion of the region of the Milky Way galaxy for about three and a half years to discover dozens of Earth-size planets in or near the habitable zone and determine how many of the billions of stars in the galaxy have such planets. The mission could be extended to six years.

The Deep Impact mission launched in 2005 and reached Comet Tempel 1 in July 2005. The "fly-by" spacecraft collected images of the comet before its "impactor" spacecraft reached the comet, and after the impact to study the pristine interior of one of its craters.

NASA's Mercury Surface, Space, Environment, Geochemistry, and Ranging (MESSENGER) spacecraft launched aboard a Delta II rocket in August 2004. The spacecraft made the 4.9-billion-mile trek to Mercury, with 15 trips around the sun and flybys of the Earth and Venus along the way. The spacecraft reached Mercury in 2008, with flybys of that planet in January and October, and again in September 2009. MESSENGER is only the second spacecraft sent to Mercury, but the first one to orbit Mercury.

New Horizons (Atlas V)

New Horizons was launched in 2006 and performed a flyby of Pluto for its main mission in July of 2015, becoming the first space probe to take high-quality photographs of it. It also recorded data about Jupiter's atmosphere, moons, and magnetosphere during a gravity assist.

After finishing its primary mission, New Horizons received a mission extension to explore objects in the Kuiper belt.

GOES and TDRS Fleet of Satellites (Atlas II)

NASA used the Atlas II to launch the National Oceanic and Atmospheric Administration (NOAA) Geostationary Operational Environmental Satellite (GOES) weather satellites, and some of the Tracking and Data Relay Satellite (TDRS) communications series of satellites into orbit. GOES-M lifted off in 2001 aboard an Atlas IIA. It was the fifth spacecraft to be launched in the current advanced series of environmental satellites for NOAA and the first to have a solar X-ray imager. The most recent TDRS launch was in January 2013 (TDRS-K) from CCAFS.

Kodiak Star (Athena I) & Lunar Prospector (Athena II)

The Athena I vehicle carried NASA's Kodiak Star mission into orbit Sept. 29, 2001, from the Kodiak Launch Complex in Alaska. NASA's Starshine 3 and three U.S. Department of Defense satellites were launched into different orbits. Starshine 3 provided data on satellite orbit decay.

The first successful launch of an Athena II carried NASA's Lunar Prospector spacecraft on a mission to search for traces of water or ice on the moon.

Terra (Atlas IIAS)

NASA launched the Earth Observing System's flagship satellite "Terra," named for Earth, in 1999. Terra has been collecting data about the changes in Earth's climate brought on by global warming. Terra carries five state-of-the-art sensors that have been studying the interactions among the Earth's atmosphere, lands, oceans, and radiant energy. Each sensor has unique design features that will enable scientists to meet a wide range of science objectives.

Stardust, Genesis (Delta II)

On Feb. 7, 1999, a Delta II launched from Launch Complex 17-A at CCAFS carrying the Stardust spacecraft. Stardust collected comet dust and volatile samples during a planned close encounter with the comet Wild 2 in January 2004. Stardust also collected samples of interstellar dust, including the recently discovered dust streaming into our Solar System. This launch was unusual in that it was the first U.S. mission dedicated solely to the study of a comet.

NASA's Genesis spacecraft launched aboard a Delta II Aug. 8, 2001, from Launch Complex 17-A at CCAFS. Genesis collected samples of solar wind — invisible, charged particles that flow outward from the Sun. The particles will be studied by scientists to search for answers to fundamental questions about the exact composition of our star and the birth of our Solar System.

Solar and Heliospheric Observatory (SOHO) (Atlas IIAS)

The SOHO spacecraft, a joint venture between NASA and the European Space Agency, was launched aboard an Atlas IIAS Dec. 2, 1995, from Space Launch Complex 36 at CCAFS. The SOHO spacecraft, which was launched Dec. 2, 1995, aboard an Atlas rocket, gathered data to study the internal structure of the Sun, its extensive outer atmosphere and the origin of solar wind, as well as the stream of highly ionized gas that blows continuously through the Solar System. The information SOHO provided helped scientists better understand the interactions between the Sun and the Earth's environment.
