= NASA DART =

NASA DART may refer to:

- NASA's DART (satellite), intended to demonstrate an automated navigation and rendezvous capability, launched in April 2005
- NASA's Double Asteroid Redirection Test, a planetary defense against near-Earth objects (NEO), launched in November 2021
