= NASA Launch Services Program =

NASA program

- LSPlogo

Agency overview
- Formed: 1998
- Jurisdiction: United States federal government
- Headquarters: Kennedy Space Center, FL
- Annual budget: US$102 million (FY 2022)
- Parent department: Space Operations Mission Directorate
- Parent agency: National Aeronautics and Space Administration
- Website: Launch Services Program

The NASA Launch Services Program (LSP) is responsible for procurement of launch services for NASA uncrewed missions and oversight of launch integration and launch preparation activity, providing added quality and mission assurance to meet program objectives. LSP operates under the NASA Space Operations Mission Directorate (SOMD).

Since 1990, NASA has purchased expendable launch vehicle launch services directly from commercial providers, whenever possible, for its scientific and applications missions. Expendable launch vehicles can accommodate all types of orbit inclinations and altitudes and are ideal vehicles for launching Earth-orbit and interplanetary missions. The Launch Services Program was established in 1998 at Kennedy Space Center for NASA's acquisition and program management of expendable launch vehicle missions. A NASA/contractor team is in place to meet the mission of the Launch Services Program, which exists to provide leadership, expertise and cost-effective services in the commercial arena to satisfy Agency wide space transportation requirements and maximize the opportunity for mission success.

Primary launch sites are Cape Canaveral Space Force Station (CCSFS) in Florida, and Vandenberg Space Force Base (VSFB) in California. Other launch locations are NASA's Wallops Flight Facility in Virginia, Reagan Test Site at Kwajalein Atoll in the Republic of the Marshall Islands, and Pacific Spaceport Complex in Alaska.

== History ==
The launch history of NASA's Launch Services Program (LSP) since the program formed in 1998 at Kennedy Space Center. The launch of NASA robotic missions occurred from a number of launch sites on a variety of rockets. After the list of launches are descriptions of select historic LSP missions.

The official list is available on the NASA website at LSP Primary Launches Archive. It does not include advisory or VADR missions included below.

== Operations ==
=== NASA Launch Services II ===
The LSP acquires space launch services using the NASA Launch Services (NLS) II Contract. Once a year, launch services contractors can be added to or offloaded from contract. The following contractors are attached to the NLS II Contract.

- Blue Origin – New Glenn 7×2, New Glenn 9×4
- Northrop Grumman – Pegasus XL
- Relativity Space - Terran R
- SpaceX – Falcon 9, Falcon Heavy, Starship
- United Launch Alliance (ULA) – Vulcan Centaur

=== Venture-Class Acquisition of Dedicated and Rideshare missions ===
NASA awarded contracts to launch services contractors to support Venture-Class Acquisition of Dedicated and Rideshare (VADR) missions in January 2022 and again in August 2024. In 2025 NASA selected six companies for additional VADR studies focused orbital transfer vehicle technology. As of September 2026, VADR "allows NASA to acquire launch services during a 10-year ordering period, with a maximum total value of $1 billion across all contracts." The current contractors selected are:

- ABL Space Systems of El Segundo, California
- Arrow Science and Technology LLC of Webster, Texas
- Astra Space Inc. of Alameda, California
- Blue Origin Florida LLC of Merritt Island, Florida
- Firefly Aerospace, Inc. of Cedar Park, Texas
- Impulse Space Inc. of Redondo Beach, California
- L2 Solutions LLC of Houston, Texas
- Momentus Space LLC of San Jose, California
- Northrop Grumman Systems Corporation of Chandler, Arizona
- Phantom Space Corporation of Tucson, Arizona
- Relativity Space Inc. of Long Beach, California
- Rocket Lab USA Inc. of Long Beach, California
- Spaceflight Inc. of Seattle, Washington
- Space Exploration Technologies Corp. (SpaceX) of Hawthorne, California
- United Launch Alliance LLC of Centennial, Colorado
- Virgin Orbit LLC of Long Beach, California (since defunct)

=== Partnered with spacecraft customers ===
The LSP works with U.S. Government spacecraft program offices to define launch requirements for their programs and then engage with launch services contractors to deliver a compatible solution. LSP has relationships with various agencies and organizations:

- Applied Physics Laboratory in Laurel, Maryland
- Jet Propulsion Laboratory, located at the California Institute of Technology
- NASA's Ames Research Center at Moffett Field, in California's Silicon Valley
- NASA's Goddard Space Flight Center in Greenbelt, Maryland
- NASA Langley Research Center in Hampton, Virginia
- NASA Marshall Space Flight Center at Redstone Arsenal in Huntsville, Alabama
- Several U.S. Universities, launching small research satellites (CubeSats)
- International partners
- Other Government Agencies:
  - Missile Defense Agency (MDA)
  - National Oceanic and Atmospheric Administration (NOAA)
  - National Reconnaissance Office (NRO)

=== Collaboration with U.S. Space Force ===
LSP also works with the United States Space Force (USSF), via coordination by the launch services contractors. For launches at Cape Canaveral Space Force Station (CCSFS) and Vandenberg Space Force Base (VSFB), the Space Launch Delta 45 and Space Launch Delta 30 commanders, respectively, are the Launch Decision Authority.

For launches from CCSFS, guardians, Space Force civilians and contractors from throughout Space Launch Delta 45 provided vital support, including weather forecasts, launch and range operations, security, safety, medical and public affairs. The wing also provided its vast network of radar, telemetry, and communications instrumentation to facilitate a safe launch on the Eastern Range. Among work done by the Space Force is Mission Flight Control, which ensures public safety during launch.

=== Operating locations ===
The LSP management, business office, and engineering teams support from the Operations and Checkout Building at Kennedy Space Center. The Launch Services Program operates Hangar AE on the Cape Canaveral Space Force Station. It is LSP's Launch Communications Center. For Florida launches, many of the primary LSP engineers on console are in Hangar AE. For launches from California and other launch sites, many of support LSP engineers are on console there. Launch services contractors and spacecraft engineers will often operate out of the Hangar also. It gathers telemetry for rocket launches beyond those worked by LSP.

LSP also maintains resident offices at:

- Vandenberg Space Force Base (California)
- United Launch Alliance (Centennial, Colorado and Decatur, Alabama)
- Northrop Grumman Innovation Systems (formerly Orbital Sciences; Dulles, Virginia and Chandler, Arizona)
- SpaceX (Hawthorne, CA)

=== Mission risk posture and launch services selection ===
NASA has specific policies governing launch services. NASA uses a certification system for rockets launched by its contractors, and for validation purposes it requires the certification process to be "instrumented to provide design verification and flight performance data", with post-flight operations, anomaly resolution process, and a flight margin verification process, with 80% predicted design reliability at 95% confidence.

Launch vehicle risk category	Vehicle maturity	Payload class	Flight experience
Cat 1 (High Risk)	No flight history	D	No previous flights required
Cat 2 (Medium Risk)	Limited flight history	C and D, sometimes B	1 successful flight of a common launch vehicle configuration, or: 3 consecutive successful flights of a common launch vehicle configuration from an evolved vehicle family developed by an LSC with a previously certified launch vehicle for Risk Category 2 or 3
Cat 3 (Low Risk)	Significant flight history	A, B, C, D	14 consecutive successful flights (95% demonstrated reliability at 50% confidence) of a common launch vehicle configuration, or: 6 successful flights (minimum 3 consecutive) of a common launch vehicle configuration from an evolved vehicle family developed by an LSC with a previously certified launch vehicle for Risk Category 3, or: 3 consecutive successful flights of a common launch vehicle configuration from an evolved vehicle family developed by an LSC with a previously certified launch vehicle for Risk Category 3

=== Additional advisory services ===
In addition to providing end-to-end launch services, LSP also offers Advisory Services. This "is a consulting service to government and commercial organizations, providing mission management, overall systems engineering and/or specific discipline expertise; e.g. mission assurance, flight design, systems safety, etc., as requested." By example, the LSP Flight Design team provides general information regarding the launch vehicle performance available via existing NASA contracts. This non-traditional service allows LSP to "expand its customer base and assist these customers in maximizing their mission success by using NASA LSP's unique expertise." The four general categories of advisory services are:

- SMART (Supplemental Mission Advisory and Risk Team)
- Design and Development
- Independent Verification and Validation (IV&V)
- Independent Review Teams (IRT)
- Spacecraft naming

== Upcoming launches ==
The schedule below includes only Launch Services Program (LSP) primary and advisory missions. The NASA Launch Schedule has the most up to date public schedule of all NASA launches. The NASA Kennedy News Releases will also have updates on LSP launches and mission accomplishments. Additional NASA pages which mention future launch dates are the LSP Education & Outreach, NASA Goddard's Explorers Program, NASA Goddard's Flight Projects Directorate and NASA Goddard's Upcoming Planetary Events and Missions.

The ELaNa Launch Schedule has the upcoming schedule of CubeSat missions, which occur on both NASA and non-NASA launches.

Scheduled Launch Date	Mission	Vehicle	Launch Site	Total Launch Cost* (million)
TBD
NET 2026.02	Aspera	Electron	Launch Complex 1 in Mahia, New Zealand	VADR Award
NET 2026.02	QuickSounder	Alpha	Vandenberg Space Launch Complex 2 (SLC-2)	VADR Award
2027
NET 2027	INvestigation of Convective UpdraftS (INCUS)	Alpha	Pad 0A at NASA's Wallops Flight Facility	VADR Award
2027	Joint Polar Satellite System (JPSS-4)	Falcon 9	Vandenberg Space Force Base Space Launch Complex 4 East (VSFB SLC-4E)	$112.7
2027	Multi-slit Solar Explorer (MUSE)	-		
NET 2027.06	Total and Spectral Solar Irradiance Sensor-2 (TSIS-2)	Electron	Launch Complex 1 in Mahia, New Zealand	VADR Award
NET 2027.06	Polarized Submillimeter Ice-cloud Radiometer (PolSIR)	Electron	Launch Complex 1 in Mahia, New Zealand	VADR Award
2027.08	Compton Spectrometer and Imager (COSI)	Falcon 9	Florida	$69
2027.09	Near-Earth Object Surveyor (NEO Surveyor)	Falcon 9	Florida	$100
NET 2027	Multi-Angle Imager for Aerosols (MAIA)+	Vega-C	Guiana Space Centre	
2028 and later
NET 2028	StarBurst	Falcon 9 on a Bandwagon rideshare mission	Cape Canaveral Space Force Station Space Launch Complex 40 (CCSFS SLC-40)	VADR Award
2028	Space Reactor-1 Freedom (SR-1 Freedom)	Falcon Heavy	Kennedy Space Center Launch Complex 39 (KSC LC-39A)	$331.8
2028.07.05	Dragonfly	Falcon Heavy	Kennedy Space Center Launch Complex 39 (KSC LC-39A)	$257
NET Late 2028	ExoMars's Rosalind Franklin Mission (RFM)	Falcon Heavy	Kennedy Space Center Launch Complex 39 (KSC LC-39A)	
NLT 2028 ("land near the lunar South Pole by 2028")	Moonfall	Vehicle Unassigned		
NET 2028	Explorer for Artemis Geology, Lunar, and Earth (EAGLE)	Vehicle Unassigned		
2029 and later
NET 2029	Dynamic Atmosphere-Ionosphere Explorer (DAPHNE)	Vehicle Unassigned		
2029	Geospace Dynamics Constellation (GDC)	Vehicle Unassigned		
2029	HelioSwarm	Vehicle Unassigned		
2030	Earth Dynamics Geodetic Explorer (EDGE)	Vehicle Unassigned		
2030	Stratosphere Troposphere Response using Infrared Vertically-resolved light Explorer (STRIVE)	Vehicle Unassigned		
2030	Precipitation Measuring Mission (PMM)	Vehicle Unassigned		
2030	UltraViolet EXplorer (UVEX)	Vehicle Unassigned		
2030	Landsat 10	Vehicle Unassigned		
2031	Deep Atmosphere Venus Investigation of Noble gases, Chemistry, and Imaging, Plus (DAVINCI+)	Vehicle Unassigned		
2031	Venus Emissivity, Radio Science, InSAR, Topography, and Spectroscopy (VERITAS)	Vehicle Unassigned		
2032	Joint Polar Satellite System (JPSS-3)	Vehicle Unassigned		
2032	Geostationary Extended Observations (GeoXO-1)	Vehicle Unassigned		
2033	PRobe far-Infrared Mission for Astrophysics (PRIMA)	Vehicle Unassigned		
2034	Geostationary Extended Observations (GeoXO-2)	Vehicle Unassigned		
2039	Geostationary Extended Observations (GeoXO-3)	Vehicle Unassigned		
2043	Geostationary Extended Observations (GeoXO-4)	Vehicle Unassigned		

KEY	
NET	No Earlier Than (Tentative)
NLT	No Later Than
(U/R)	Under Review
+	LSP Advisory Mission
*	The total cost for NASA to launch the mission includes the launch service, spacecraft processing, payload integration, tracking, data and telemetry, mission unique launch site ground support, and other launch support requirements. All costs listed are approximate. Some spacecraft were awarded as a group, which is why their cost is listed as 1 of a number of spacecraft. Unless the reference specifies otherwise, the value is at award (i.e. when the launch service contract is signed) and does not account for additional costs due to delays and other factors or any cost savings that may have occurred later. To see latest, go to NASA Procurement's Latest Contract Releases

== Research ==
=== Technical subject matter expertise ===
The Launch Services Program team also performs research relating to launching uncrewed NASA spacecraft. Research and technical analysis topics include:

- Flight Design analysts work on the intended course, or trajectory, of the rocket.
- Telemetry engineers get tracking stations to cover all the mandatory portions of flight. Analysts from many disciplines review this data post-flight.
- Weather Forecasters Balance Experience with Technology
- The Failure Analysis and Materials Evaluation Lab assists the program by examining failures and figuring out what went wrong
- Collision Avoidance (COLA)
- Upper-level Winds on Day-of-Launch; collaborations with groups such as the NASA Kennedy Space Center Applied Meteorology Unit (AMU) and Space Launch Delta 45.
- Slosh Fluid Dynamics

=== Slosh fluid dynamics experiments ===
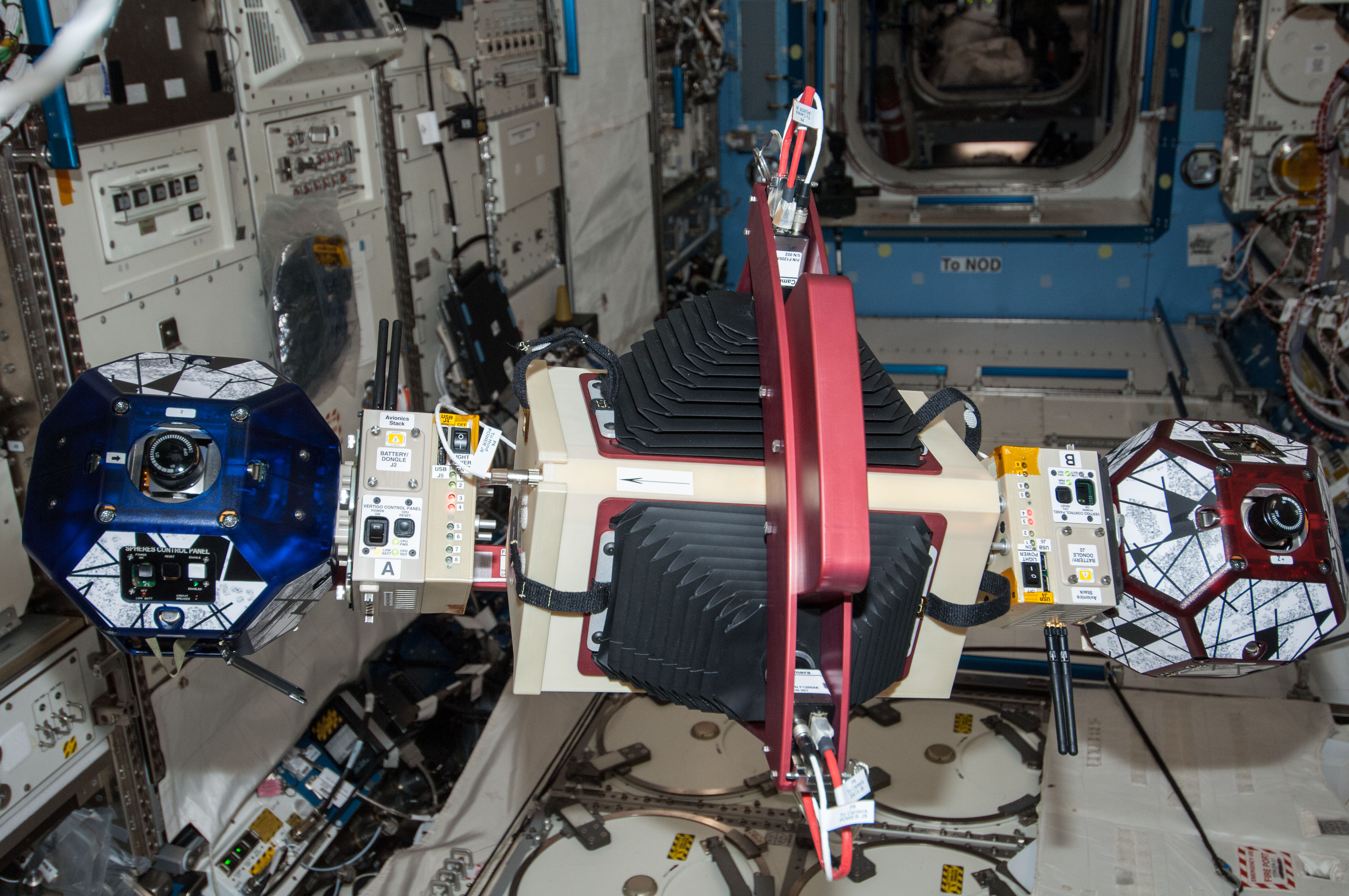
SPHERES SLOSH hardware

SPHERES-Slosh will be performed on the SPHERES Testbed on the International Space Station. The experiment launched on the Cygnus capsule going to the ISS via Orbital Sciences Corporation Commercial Resupply Services Orb-1 mission on an Antares on 2014.01.09. The Cygnus arrived at the ISS on 2014.01.12 and will spend five weeks unloading the cargo.

The SPHERES-Slosh investigation uses small robotic satellites on the International Space Station to examine how liquids move around inside containers in microgravity. A water bottle's contents slosh around differently in space than on Earth, but the physics of liquid motion in microgravity are not well understood, which affects computer simulations of liquid rocket fuel behavior. LSP leads a team that includes Florida Institute of Technology and Massachusetts Institute of Technology. The research is sponsored by the Game Changing Development (GCD) program (within NASA Technology Demonstration Office (TDO)'s Space Technology Mission Directorate).

The experiment is a water tank with cameras and sensors that will be mounted between two SPHERES satellites inside the ISS. During testing, the SPHERES will move to purposely agitate the water and cause the fluid inside to slosh around, like it might in a rocket or spacecraft tank during flight. The data collected will be one of a kind. Three initial tests are expected to happen with the first couple months of launch.

"The current inability to accurately predict fuel and oxidizer behavior can result in unnecessary caution, requiring extra propellant to be added along with additional helium for tank pressurization. A better understanding of fluid slosh could not only decrease this uncertainty, but increase efficiency, reduce costs and allow additional payloads to be launched." Understanding from this experiment could help improve design/operations of rocket tanks and control systems.

NASA's Brandon Marsell, co-principal investigator on the Slosh Project: "Modern computer models try to predict how liquid moves inside a propellant tank. Now that rockets are bigger and are going farther, we need more precise data. Most of the models we have were validated under 1 g conditions on Earth. None have been validated in the surface tension-dominated microgravity environment of space." (via Langley Research Center article)

Slosh is the first project on the ISS to use 3D printed materials for its experiment. NASA's Jacob Roth, project manager on the Slosh Project, on the first science session: "The results from our first checkout run are proving interesting. While not too unexpected, the bubble/liquid interaction behavior appears to be exhibiting a slightly different interaction than current models predict." The team will be altering the tests for the second session based on the preliminary results.

Videos

- Space Station Live: Fluid Motion Study Using Mini-Satellites - Reel NASA Interview with LSP's Dr. Paul Schallhorn to explain the experiment
- Space to Ground - 1/17/14 - Reel NASA update on ISS includes launch of SPHERES-Slosh

The 2008-2010 slosh related tests on SPHERES were performed with a single SPHERES spacecraft and, in some cases, the addition of a battery pack Velcroed on to the SPHERES spacecraft. These tests were to better understand the physical properties of the SPHERES spacecraft, notably the mass properties, prior adding any tanks to the system. Some of the tests also attempted to excite and then sense slosh within the SPHERES CO_{2} tank. Florida Tech designed the slosh experiments for Test Sessions 18/20/24/25.

Date	Session	Slosh-related Tests on the SPHERES ISS Testbed	Report	ISS Expedition	Media
2008.09.27	13	P221 Tests 2 & 5: Fuel Slosh – Sat only & Batt Proof Mass		17	
2008.10.27	14	P236, Tests 7 & 8: Fluid Slosh, Rotate 2: Sat Only & Batt Proof Mass		18	
2009.07.11	16	P251, Test 2 Fluid Slosh - X Nutation & Test 3 Fluid Slosh - Rotation Rate High		20	
2009.08.15	18	P264, Tests A/2, B/3 Fluid Slosh - Z Motion Fluid Slosh (full tank/partially used tank)		20	
2009.12.05	20	P20A, Fluid Slosh Test 3/4: Z Reverse T1/T2, Test 5/6: Fluid Slosh Spin Z Forward/Reverse		21	
2010.10.07	24	P24A, Tests 4/5: Fluid Slosh: Lateral/Circular Motion		25	
2010.10.28	25	P311, Tests 2/3/5: Fluid Slosh: Z Translation/X Translation/X Rotation		25	
2014.01.22	54	Slosh Checkout (1st SPHERES-Slosh Test Session)		38	Expedition 38 Image Gallery
2014.02.28	58	Slosh Science 1 (2nd SPHERES-Slosh Test Session)		38	
2014.06.18	60	Slosh Science 2 (3rd SPHERES-Slosh Test Session)		40	Expedition 40 Image Gallery
2015.07		Slosh Science 3 (4th SPHERES-Slosh Test Session)		44	
2015.08.07		Slosh Science 4 (5th SPHERES-Slosh Test Session)		44	
2015.09.10	77	Slosh Science 5 (6th SPHERES-Slosh Test Session)		45	
2015.11.12		Slosh Science 6 (7th SPHERES-Slosh Test Session)		45	

=== Cryogenic orbital testbed ===
The Cryogenic Orbital Testbed (CRYOTE) is a collaboration between NASA and commercial companies to develop an orbital testbed that will demonstrate cryogenic fluid management technologies in space environments. "The testbed provides an in-space environment in which the fluid transfer, handling, and storage of liquid hydrogen (LH2) and/or liquid oxygen (LO2) can be demonstrated."

The research is funded by the NASA Innovative Partnership Program (IPP) in the Office of the Chief Technologist. "The partners involved in the development of this system include United Launch Alliance (ULA), Sierra Lobo, Innovative Engineering Solutions (IES), Yetispace, and NASA Glenn Research Center, Kennedy Space Center, and Marshall Space Flight Center."

== Outreach ==
=== Educational outreach ===
NASA's Launch Services Program Educational Outreach provides awareness to students, teachers and the public about NASA's exciting spacecraft missions and how the world benefits from them. Distance learning via video conference connects students to LSP experts

The office also coordinates activities and educational booths at events for NASA and the public. The outreach is performed by both members of the LSP Educational Outreach Office and LSP experts throughout the program.

The LSP Educational Outreach Office created the Rocket Science 101 Game. Students can pick a NASA mission, select the right rocket, and build a rocket to send the spacecraft into orbit. There are three different levels for varying ages and it is available for the computer and Apple/Android devices.

=== CubeSat Launch Initiative and Educational Launch of Nanosatellites ===
NASA and the Launch Services Program are partnering with several universities to launch small research satellites. These small satellites are called CubeSats. The CubeSat Launch Initiative (CSLI) provides opportunities for small satellite payloads to fly on rockets planned for upcoming launches. As of February 2015, CSLI has selected 119 spacecraft since 2010.

The Educational Launch of Nanosatellites (ELaNa) program is a part of CSLI. ELaNa manifests the CubeSats selected by CSLI onto upcoming rocket launches. CubeSats were first included on the launch of LSP missions in 2011. ELaNa missions are not manifested exclusively on LSP missions; they have been a part of NRO/military launches and ELaNa V will be on an International Space Station resupply launch. ELaNa mission numbers are based on the order they are manifested; due to the nature of launching, the actual launch order differs from the mission numbers.

In 2014, as a part of the White House Maker Initiative, CSLI announced its intention to launch 50 small satellites from 50 states within five years. As of July 2014, there were 21 "rookie states" that had not previously been selected by the CSLI

In October 2015, NASA's LSP, with funding partnered by Earth Science Division of NASA's Science Mission Directorate, "awarded multiple Venture Class Launch Services (VCLS) contracts to provide small satellites (SmallSats) -- also called CubeSats, microsats or nanosatellites -- access to low-Earth orbit." Three companies received $4–7 million firm fixed-price contracts. The intention of the VCLS contracts is to provide alternatives to the current rideshare-type approach for launch of small satellites.

=== Community Involvement ===
STEM teams are sponsored and mentored by NASA's Launch Services Program.

==== FIRST Robotics: Team 1592 - Bionic Tigers ====
FIRST Robotics Competition Team 1592 (the Bionic Tigers) is out of Cocoa High School (CHS) and Holy Trinity Episcopal Academy. The founding mentors of the team were Analex contractors working for LSP; the team has had NASA LSP engineering mentors ever since 2006.

==== Merritt Island High School StangSat ====
Merritt Island High School, in partnership with California Polytechnic State University, has a team building a CubeSat as part of Kennedy Space Center's Creating Understanding and Broadening Education through Satellite (CUBES) pilot project. The team's StangSat was accepted by the CubeSat Launch Initiative and launched 25 June 2019 as part of ELaNa XV, via the Space Test Program, on a SpaceX Falcon Heavy rocket.

The satellite, named StangSat after the school's Mustang mascot, will collect data on the amount of shock and vibration experienced by payloads while in orbit.,

On June 15, 2013, the team launched an engineering unit of StangSat on the Prospector-18 rocket; the suborbital flight took off from the Friends of Amateur Rocketry site in California's Mojave Desert. The other satellites on board were Rocket University Broad Initiatives CubeSat, or RUBICS-1 (KSC); PhoneSat (ARC); and CP-9 (CalPoly). Though the parachute deployed early, resulting in a hard landing, all four satellites were able to collect usable data.

The team will be only the second high school to launch a satellite into orbit, after Thomas Jefferson High School for Science and Technology's TJ3Sat in November 2013 (another ELaNa mission).

=== Social media ===
NASA's Launch Services Program formerly maintained social media accounts on Facebook and Twitter. NASA Kennedy Space Center social media accounts frequently post news involving LSP activities. NASA has compiled a page will all its flagship social media accounts across many different platforms. The spacecraft section of this page has accounts for many of the spacecraft launched by NASA LSP.

NASA Public Affairs posts pictures and videos of NASA LSP spacecraft and rockets as they go through processing and launch. A launch blog is also stood up for each launch campaign and is always updated on launch day by Kennedy Space Center Public Affairs.

Since NASA Socials were started in 2009, NASA LSP has participated in many for the launch of its missions: Juno, GRAIL, NPP, MSL, KSC 50th/MSL Landing, RBSP, MAVEN and more. NASA Socials allow social media followers to receive VIP access to NASA facilities and speakers. The participants post about their experiences with NASA, performing outreach to their networks. NASA LSP has provided speakers for these events, along with tour guides and other support. NASA Socials were formerly known as Tweetups.

NASA has created many apps, some of which feature NASA LSP and its spacecraft. One popular app is Spacecraft 3D, which features several spacecraft launched by LSP. Developed by JPL, the app allows uses to take 3D tours of many JPL spacecraft using a printed piece of paper and their phone or tablet. Users can rotate and zoom in on the spacecraft, along with deploying movable parts of the spacecraft such as solar arrays, masts, and booms. By deploying and retracting these parts, a user can get a sense of how the spacecraft goes from the launch configuration on top of the rocket to operation configuration when it's collecting scientific data.

== See also ==
- Commercial Spaceflight Federation
- List of Launch Services Program launches
