= Hangar AE =

Coordinates: 28°29′23.7″N 80°35′6.2″W

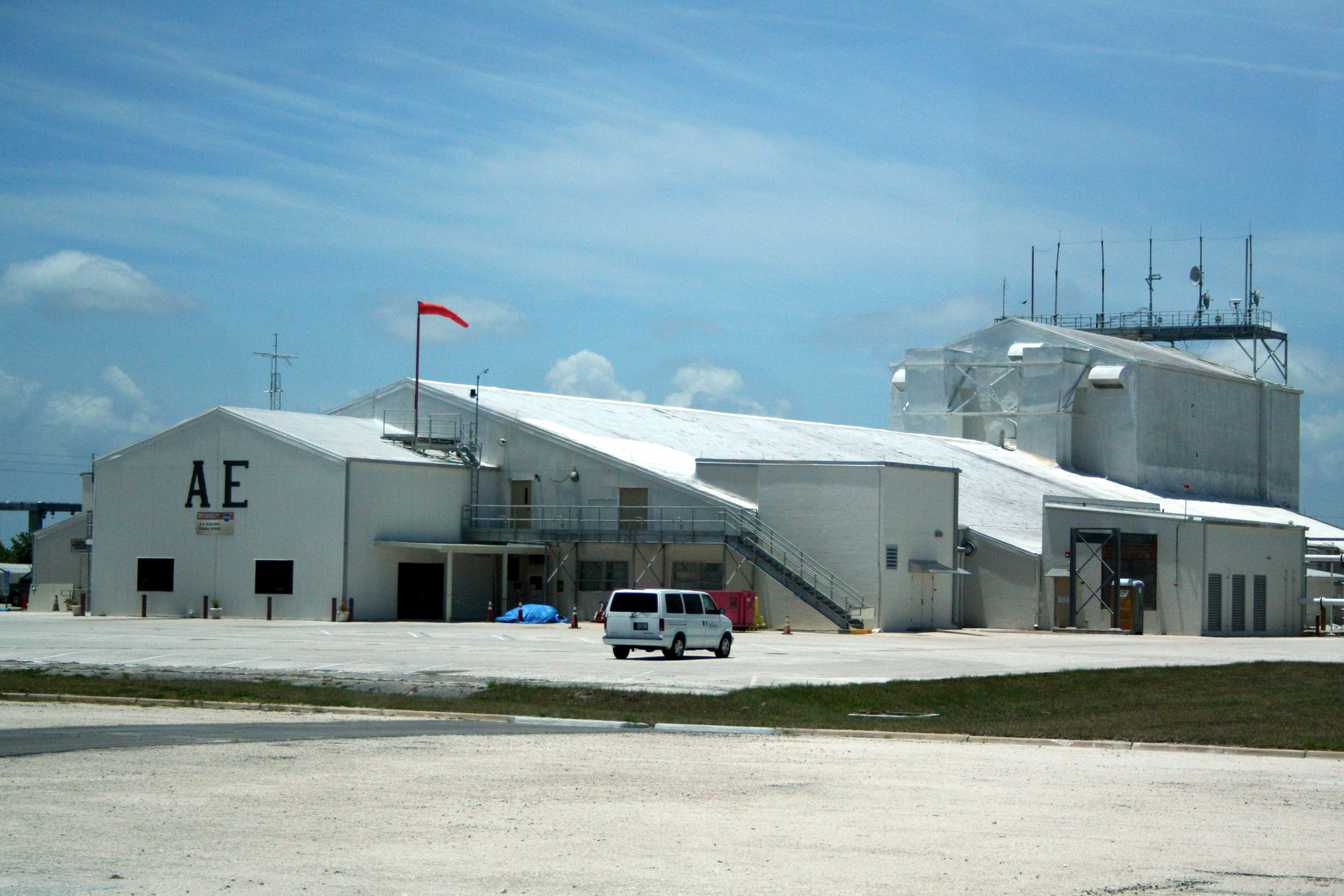
Hangar AE

Built in 1959, Hangar AE was originally built for a Department of Defense missile program. The facility was acquired in 1960 by NASA and modified for unmanned missions. The building contains a Class 10K horizontal laminar flow clean room complex, a telemetry ground station, an extensive communications center for data, voice and video, 3 launch vehicle data centers (LVDC), the Mission Director’s Center (MDC), and offices for payload and contractor personnel. It is located at Cape Canaveral Space Force Station, but it is maintained by NASA Kennedy Space Center.

NASA's Launch Services Program (LSP) utilizes this facility as its launch communications center. The entire building is environmentally controlled.

The Hangar AE control rooms provide real-time voice, data and video information for expendable vehicle checkout and launch operations, similar to that provided by the Space Shuttle control rooms. Each console in the LVDC has a 40-channel voice instrument called a MOCS2 (Mission Operation Communication System version 2). Other areas have 24-channel versions of the MOCS2. Each console has access to an administrative telephone and a modem line for use with a laptop computer, if required.

The building can obtain data from launch sites beyond those at Kennedy Space Center and Cape Canaveral Space Force Station. Launch sites for missions Hangar AE have gathered telemetry on include:

- Vandenberg Air Force Base (California)
- Reagan Test Site (Kwajalein Atoll, Marshall Islands)
- Wallops Flight Facility (Virginia)
- Kodiak Launch Complex (Alaska)

The building was one of several Kennedy Space Center buildings to receive substantial damage during Hurricane Frances in 2004. Separately, the clean room experienced a fire and is not currently certified for use.

During the TDRS-L launch in January 2014, LSP engineers located in Hangar AE troubleshot a problem with periodic dropouts in telemetry from the vehicle threatened to stop the launch and allowed the launch to continue that night.

== Spacecraft processed ==
- Swift Gamma-Ray Burst Mission
