= MUBLCOM =

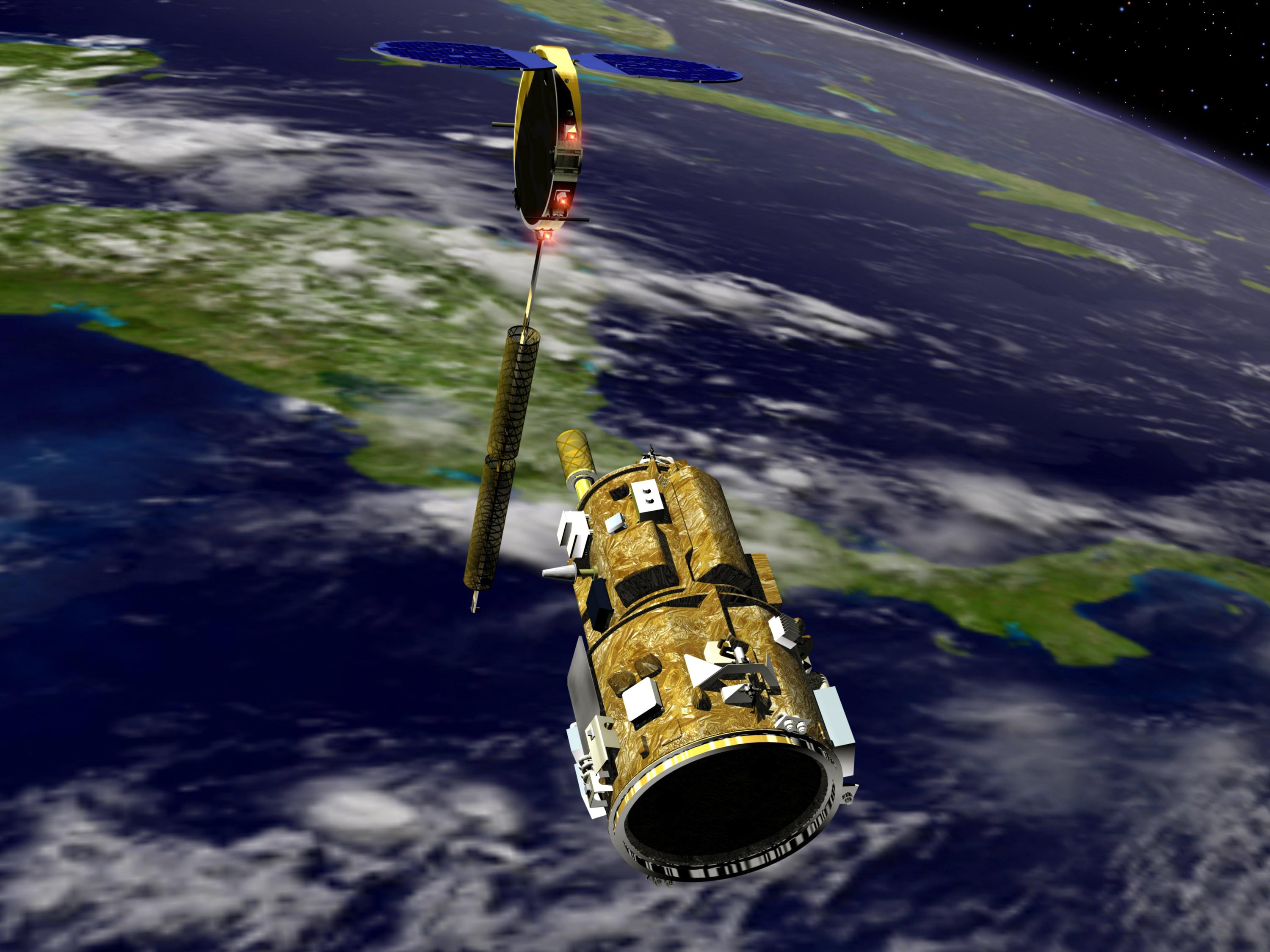
- DART (bottom) approaching the MUBLCOM satellite (top)
- Mission type: Technology Demonstrator
- Operator: DARPA
- COSPAR ID: 1999-026B
- SATCAT no.: 25736

Spacecraft properties
- Launch mass: 100 kilograms (220 lb)
- Dry mass: 50 kilograms (110 lb)

Start of mission
- Launch date: May 18, 1999
- Rocket: Pegasus
- Launch site: Vandenberg
- Contractor: Orbital

Orbital parameters
- Reference system: Geocentric
- Regime: Low Earth
- Eccentricity: 0.000384
- Perigee altitude: 726 kilometers (451 mi)
- Apogee altitude: 732 kilometers (455 mi)
- Inclination: 97.7 degrees
- Period: 99.4 minutes

The Multiple Paths, Beyond-Line-of-Sight Communications (MUBLCOM) satellite (COSPAR 1999-026B, SATCAT 25736), built for the Pentagon's Defense Advanced Research Projects Agency, was launched in May 1999 by a Pegasus. Its mission was to demonstrate a capability to provide space-based digital voice and data communications to combat forces or commercial users that were previously considered out of range of standard radio communications systems.

On April 15, 2005, the Demonstration of Autonomous Rendezvous Technology (DART) spacecraft collided with the MUBLCOM satellite while attempting to rendezvous with it.
