= Polarized Submillimeter Ice-cloud Radiometer =

Nanosatellite

PolSIR
- Mission type: Earth science
- Operator: Vanderbilt University; NASA-GSFC

Spacecraft properties
- Spacecraft type: CubeSat
- Manufacturer: Blue Canyon Technologies
- Dry mass: 36 kilograms (79 lb)
- Dimensions: 20cm x 20cm x 40cm

Start of mission
- Launch date: 2027
- Rocket: TBD

End of mission
- Disposal: Re-entry

Orbital parameters
- Reference system: Geocentric
- Regime: Low Earth
- Periapsis altitude: 550 kilometres (340 mi)
- Apoapsis altitude: 550 kilometres (340 mi)
- Inclination: 51.2°

Instruments
- 325 GHz radiometer, 684 GHz radiometer

The Polarized Submillimeter Ice-cloud Radiometer (PolSIR) is a NASA space mission consisting of two 16U CubeSats flying in low Earth orbit, expected to launch in 2028. This mission intends to measure characteristics of ice clouds in tropical and subtropical regions (between 35 degrees North and South latitude) to improve understanding of Earth's dynamic atmosphere. This mission follows the previous successful NASA CubeSat mission also studying ice clouds with radiometry, IceCube.

== See also ==
- Lunar IceCube
- IceCube (spacecraft)
