= DART (satellite) =

NASA Autonomous Rendezvous demo 2005

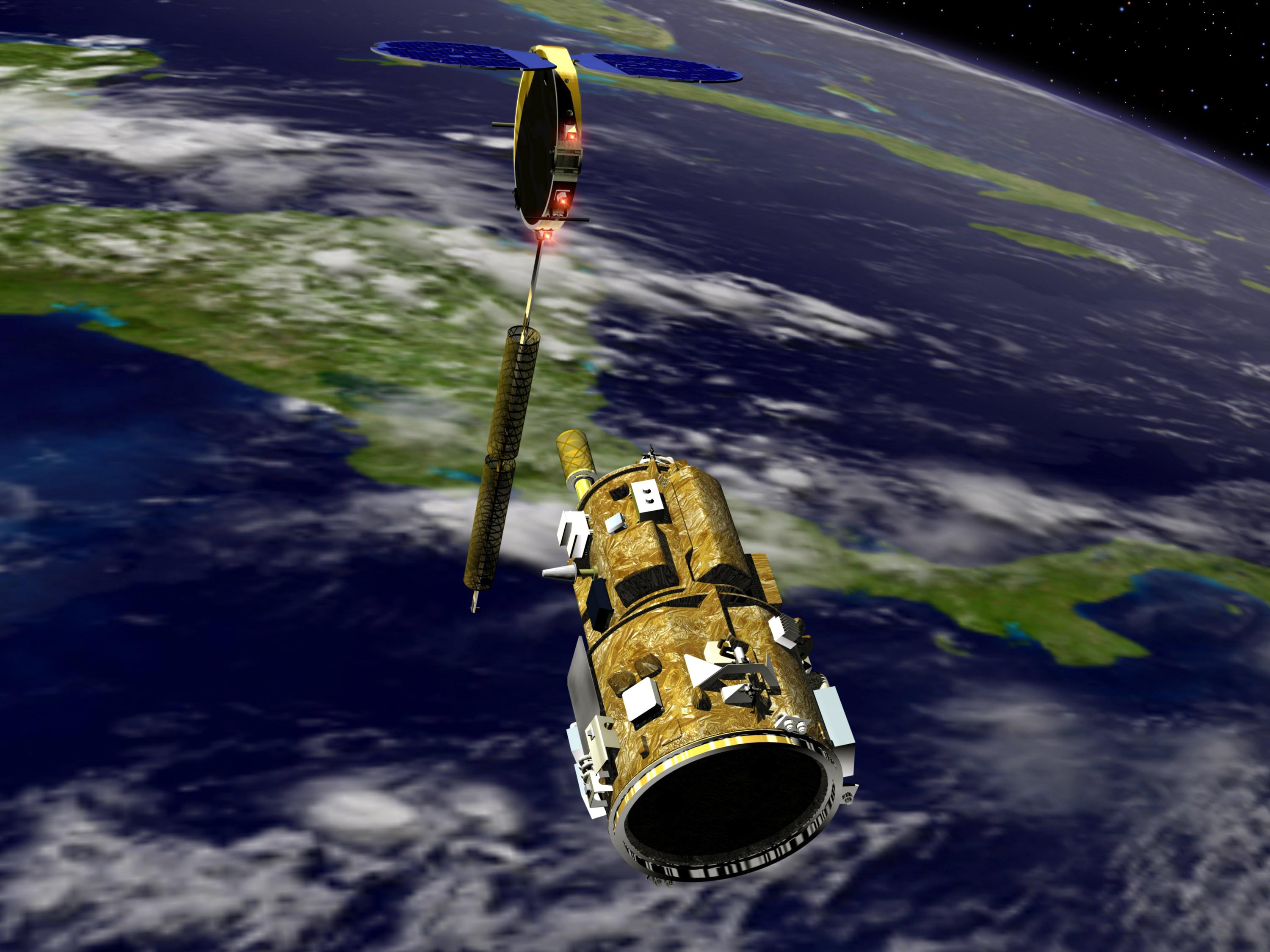
Artistic impression of NASA's DART spacecraft (below) approaching MUBLCOM (above) while orbiting over the eastern Pacific Ocean near Central America

DART, or Demonstration for Autonomous Rendezvous Technology, was a NASA spacecraft with the goal to develop and demonstrate an automated navigation and rendezvous capability. At the time of the DART mission, only the Russian Federal Space Agency and the Japan Aerospace Exploration Agency had autonomous spacecraft navigation. Orbital Sciences Corporation (OSC) was the prime contractor for construction, launch and operation of the DART spacecraft with a project cost of US$110 million (2005). The contract was awarded in June 2001 and the spacecraft was launched on 15 April 2005. The mission ended prematurely, very shortly after an anomalous slow-velocity collision with its target spacecraft, having completed less than half of the original mission autonomous rendezvous objectives.

== Mission ==
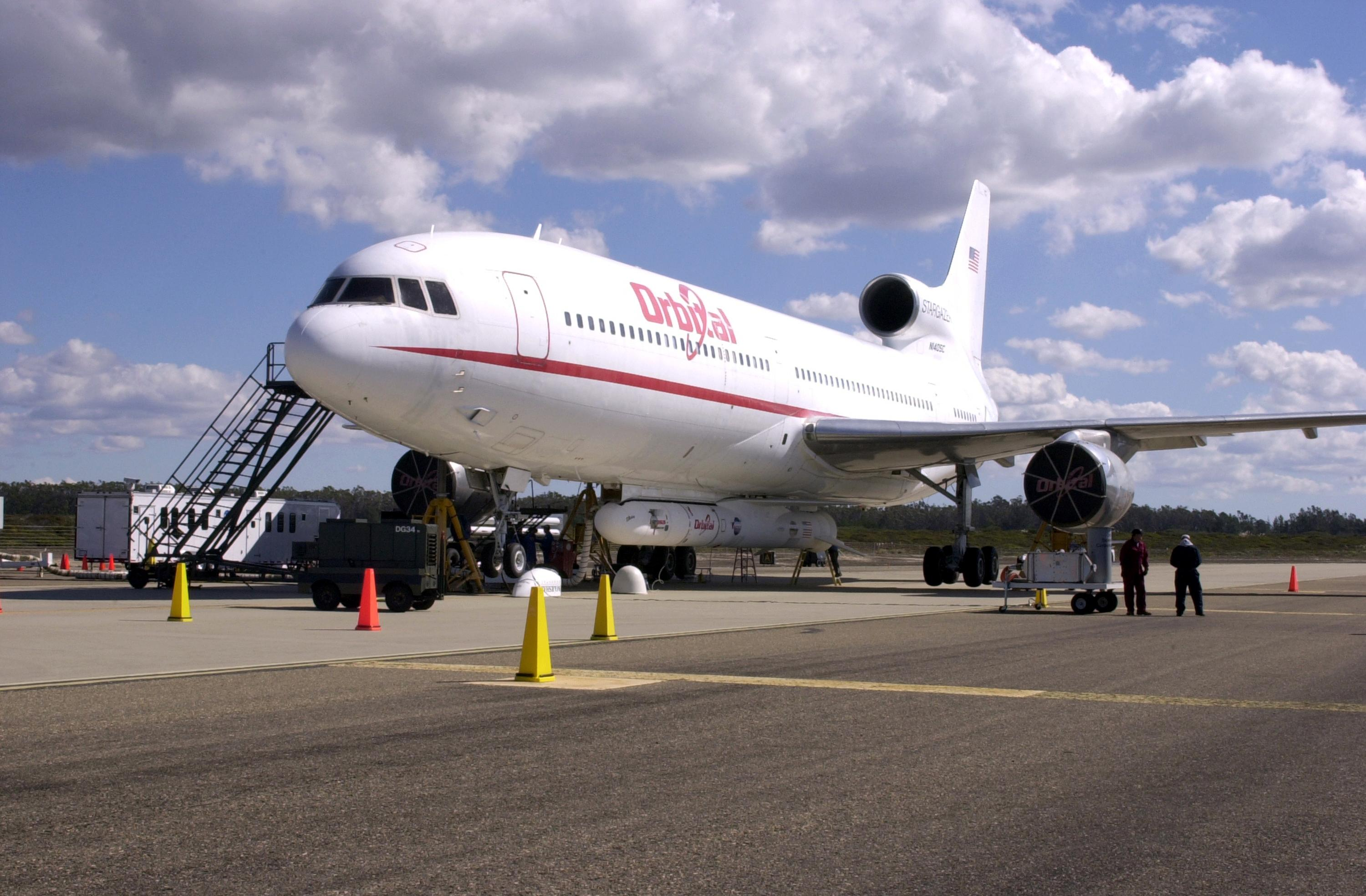
DART spacecraft and Pegasus launch vehicle attached underneath Orbital's L-1011 aircraft

DART was launched on a Pegasus rocket into a polar orbit of 760 km × 770 km (470 mi × 480 mi) and has International Designator 2005-014A. The craft is 2 by 1 m (6 ft 7 in by 3 ft 3 in) and weighs 360 kg (790 lb). The maneuvering system comprised 16 nitrogen-fueled thrusters with three hydrazine-fueled thrusters and a reaction control system including six nitrogen-fueled thrusters from the Pegasus fourth stage, which forms an integral part of the spacecraft. The target spacecraft was an OSC MUBLCOM (Multiple-Path Beyond-Line-of-Sight Communications) prototype communications relay satellite weighing approximately 49 kg (108 lb) launched from Vandenberg Air Force Base on 18 May 1999 with International Designator 1999-026B.

After launch, DART successfully achieved orbit and within hours made a rendezvous with the target satellite. The automated systems aboard DART successfully acquired the target and began autonomously approaching it. During proximity operations, multiple malfunctions in navigation, propellant management and collision avoidance programming led to a soft collision with the target and premature destruction and retirement of the DART spacecraft.

DART had no capability for interactive piloting from the ground or for uploading new programming after launch, thus all on-orbit operations were directed by DART itself based upon pre-programmed criteria.

=== Objectives ===
==== Automatic orbital transfer maneuvers ====
The craft autonomously navigated via a series of orbit transfer maneuvers to reach the target satellite. No navigational information was relayed to the vehicle after launch; it navigated autonomously and with GPS.

==== Proximity operations with AVGS ====
Once the spacecraft had navigated to the target satellite, it was to have performed a series of proximity maneuvers. The maneuvers would have demonstrated the capabilities of the AVGS (Advanced Video Guidance Sensor). It was planned to demonstrate station keeping, docking axis approach, circumnavigation, and a collision avoidance maneuver. DART would have then departed the vicinity and retired to a final orbit. The entire sequence was to have been accomplished under autonomous control.

==== Additional demonstrations ====
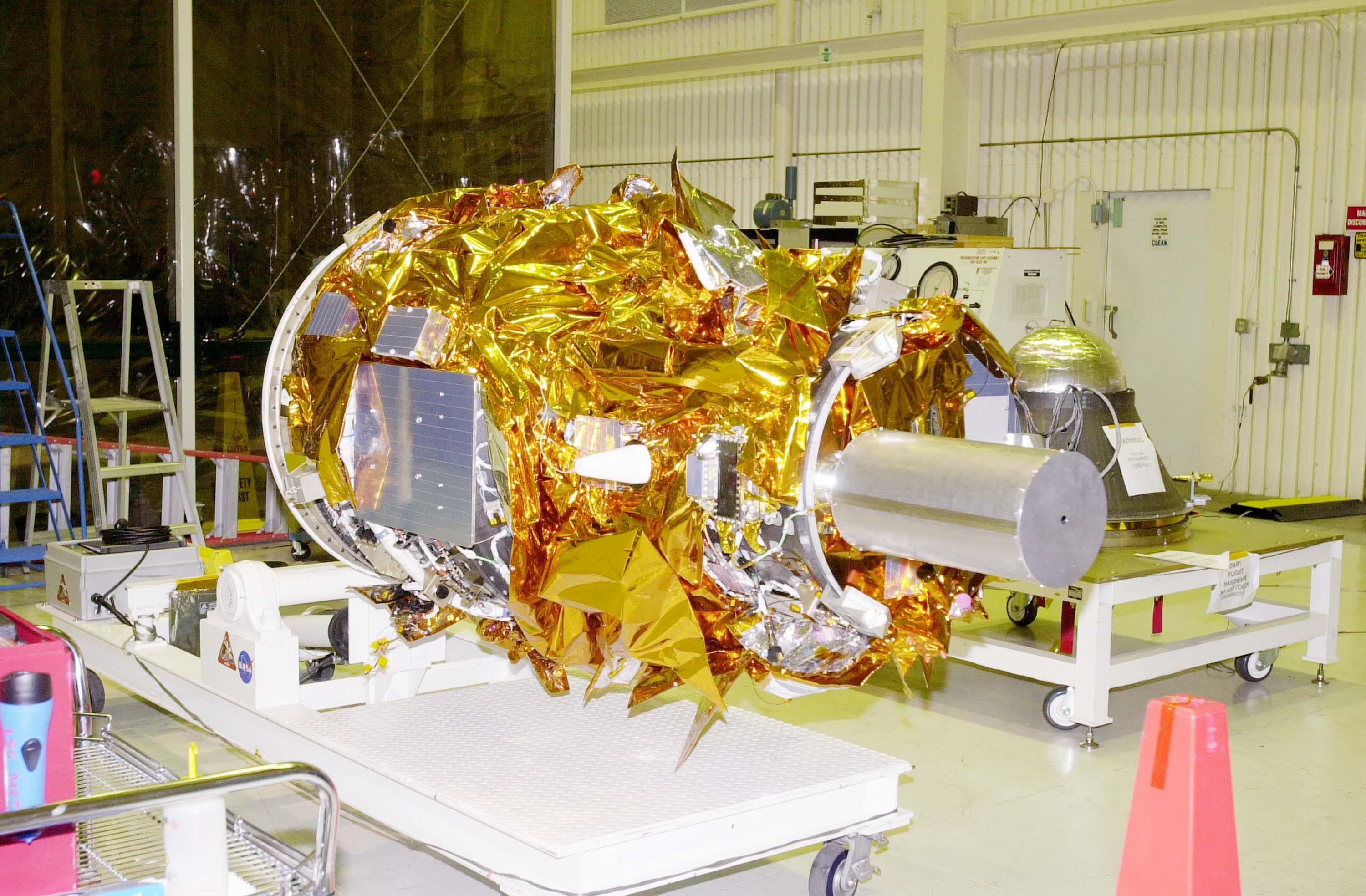
DART at Vandenberg AFB

- Validate ground test results of the AVGS and proximity-operations algorithms
- Provide hardware capabilities for future missions by validating the AVGS in the space environment

== Mishap investigation board ==
NASA convened a mishap investigation board to determine the reason for the DART spacecraft anomaly. First reports pointed to the spacecraft running out of fuel before concluding its mission.

On 14 April 2006, NASA announced that they would not release the investigation's report, citing that the report includes details protected by the International Traffic in Arms Regulations (ITAR).

On 15 May 2006, NASA released a public summary of the DART mishap investigation board report. NASA revealed that a critical navigation failure occurred when the DART and MUBLCOM spacecraft were about 200 meters apart, which precluded the full activation of the AVGS and allowed DART to approach MUBLCOM without accurate ranging information. A later failure of the collision avoidance system, which was relying upon inaccurate position and velocity information, allowed DART to ultimately collide with MUBLCOM at a relative speed of approximately 1.5 meters per second. Both spacecraft survived the collision without apparent damage. Throughout the autonomous proximity operations, DART used its limited propellant faster than anticipated, which caused "a premature end to the mission" 3 minutes 49 seconds after the collision. DART initiated its retirement programming, removed itself from the vicinity of MUBLCOM, and prepared for deorbit. After the collision, MUBLCOM "regained its operational status after an automatic system reset".

The DART Mishap Investigation Board determined that only 11 of the 27 defined mission objectives were partially or fully met, all of which related to the launch, early orbit, rendezvous, departure, and retirement phases. None of the 14 objectives related to the proximity operations phase were met.

== Atmospheric entry ==
DART re-entered in the atmosphere of Earth around 08:32 UTC on 7 May 2016 over the south Pacific Ocean.

== See also ==
- Attitude control
- Orbital Express
- Spacecraft
