= 1999 in spaceflight =

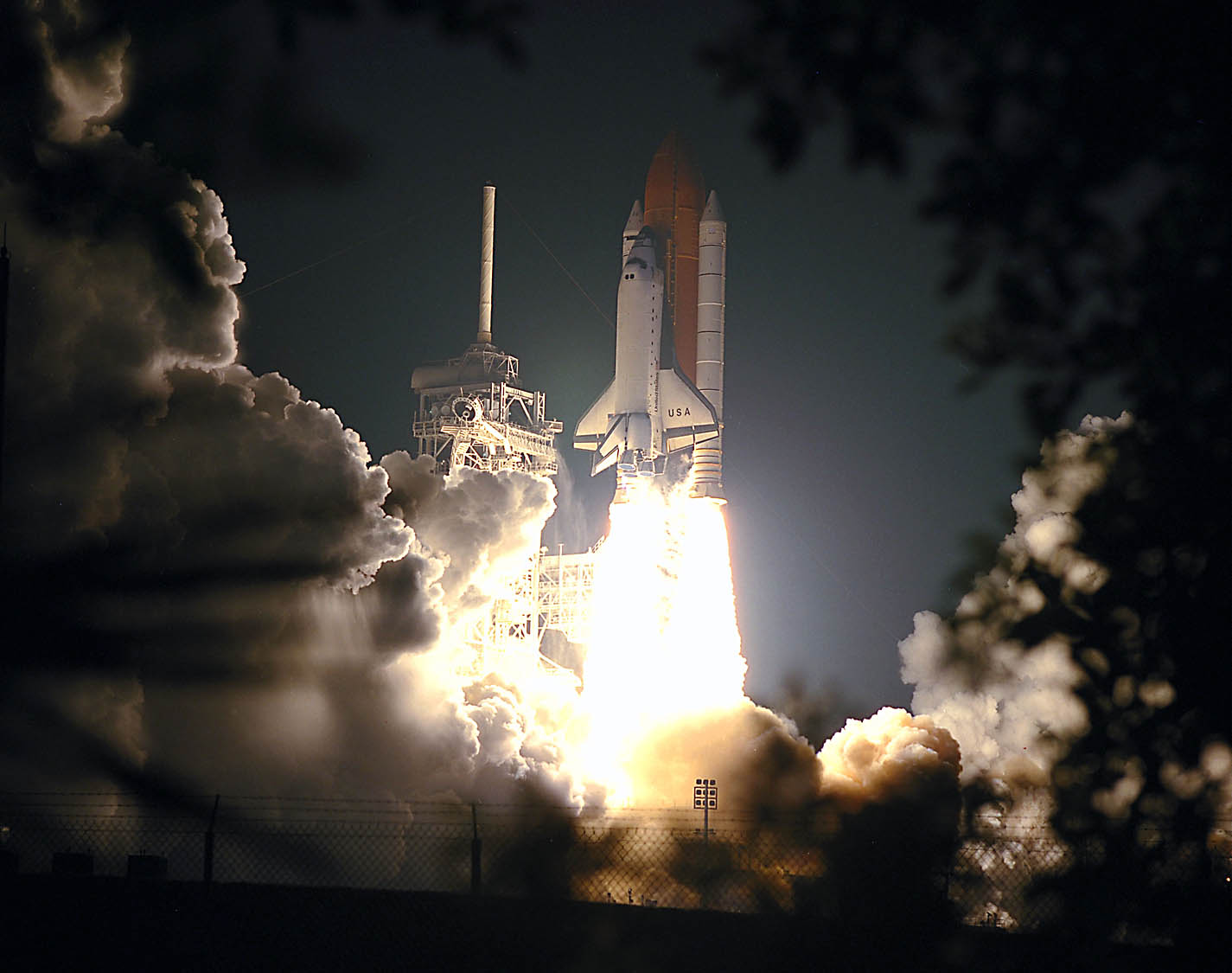
- Launch of STS-93, to deploy the Chandra X-ray Observatory

Orbital launches
- First: 3 January
- Last: 27 December
- Total: 79
- Successes: 73
- Failures: 6
- Catalogued: 73

National firsts
- Satellite: Denmark; Republic of China; South Africa

Rockets
- Maiden flights: Delta II 7320; Delta II 7426; Dnepr; Long March 2F; Long March 4B; Zenit-3SL
- Retirements: Ariane 4 40; Athena II; H-II

Crewed flights
- Orbital: 4
- Total travellers: 22

1999 in spaceflight

== Launch of Chandra X-ray Observatory ==
STS-93 in 1999 marked the 95th launch of the Space Shuttle, the 26th launch of Columbia, and the 21st night launch of a Space Shuttle. Eileen Collins became the first female shuttle Commander on this flight. Its primary mission was to launch the Chandra X-ray Observatory, the heaviest payload ever carried by the Space Shuttle system, at 22,780 kilograms (50,222 lb).

== Table ==
The table below shows 208 satellite launches were made in 1999. 81 (39%) of these launches were communications satellites.

== Orbital launches ==
- ← Jan
- Feb
- Mar
- Apr
- May
- Jun
- Jul
- Aug
- Sep
- Oct
- Nov
- Dec →

Date and time (UTC)	Rocket	Flight number	Launch site		LSP	
Date and time (UTC)	Payload (⚀ = CubeSat)	Operator	Orbit	Function	Decay (UTC)	Outcome
Date and time (UTC)	Remarks					
=== January ===
3 January; 20:21	(United States) Delta II 7425-9.5		(United States) Cape Canaveral SLC-17B		(United States) Boeing IDS	
3 January; 20:21	(United States) Mars Polar Lander	NASA	Heliocentric	Mars lander	3 December; ~20:01	Spacecraft failure
3 January; 20:21	(United States) Scott (Microprobe/Penetrator 1)	NASA	Heliocentric	Mars lander	3 December; ~20:01	Spacecraft failure
3 January; 20:21	(United States) Amundsen (Microprobe/Penetrator 2)	NASA	Heliocentric	Mars lander	3 December; ~20:01	Spacecraft failure
3 January; 20:21	Contact lost at 20:02 UTC on 3 December 1999					
27 January; 00:34	(United States) Athena I		(United States) Spaceport Florida LC-46		(United States) Lockheed Martin	
27 January; 00:34	(Taiwan) ROCSAT-1	NSPO	Low Earth	Imagery/Communications	In orbit	Operational
27 January; 00:34	First Taiwanese satellite					
=== February ===
7 February; 21:04	(United States) Delta II 7426-9.5		(United States) Cape Canaveral SLC-17A		(United States) Boeing IDS	
7 February; 21:04	(United States) Stardust	NASA	Heliocentric	Comet sample return	In orbit	Successful
7 February; 21:04	(United States) Stardust return capsule	NASA	Heliocentric	Comet sample return	16 January 2006	Successful
7 February; 21:04	Maiden flight of Delta II 7426; Returned sample from 81P/Wild and will visit Tempel 1					
9 February; 03:53	(Russia) Soyuz-U/Ikar		(Kazakhstan) Baikonur Site 1/5		(France) (Russia) Starsem	
9 February; 03:53	(United States) Globalstar 23	Globalstar	Low Earth	Communications	In orbit	Operational
9 February; 03:53	(United States) Globalstar 40	Globalstar	Low Earth	Communications	In orbit	Operational
9 February; 03:53	(United States) Globalstar 36	Globalstar	Low Earth	Communications	In orbit	Operational
9 February; 03:53	(United States) Globalstar 38	Globalstar	Low Earth	Communications	In orbit	Operational
9 February; 03:53	First launch contracted by Starsem					
15 February; 05:12	(Russia) Proton-K/DM-2M		(Kazakhstan) Baikonur Site 81/23		(Russia) (United States) International Launch Services	
15 February; 05:12	(United States) Telstar 6	Telstar	Geosynchronous	Communications	In orbit	Operational
16 February; 01:45	(United States) Atlas IIAS		(United States) Cape Canaveral SLC-36A		(Russia) (United States) International Launch Services	
16 February; 01:45	(Japan) JCSAT-6	JSAT	Geosynchronous	Communications	In orbit	Operational
20 February; 04:18	(Russia) Soyuz-U		(Kazakhstan) Baikonur Site 1/5		(Russia) Roskosmos	
20 February; 04:18	(Russia) Soyuz TM-29	Roskosmos	Low Earth (Mir)	Mir EO-27	28 August; 00:34	Successful
20 February; 04:18	Crewed orbital flight with three cosmonauts					
23 February; 10:29	(United States) Delta II 7920-10		(United States) Vandenberg SLC-2W		(United States) Boeing IDS	
23 February; 10:29	(United States) ARGOS	US Air Force	Sun-synchronous	Technology development	In orbit	Successful
23 February; 10:29	(Denmark) Ørsted	DMI	Sun-synchronous	Magnetosphere research	In orbit	Operational
23 February; 10:29	(South Africa) SUNSAT	Stellenbosch	Sun-synchronous	Technology demonstration	In orbit	Successful
23 February; 10:29	ARGOS was retired on 31 July 2003; Ørsted was the first Danish satellite and SUNSAT was the first South African satellite					
26 February; 22:44	(France) Ariane 4 44L		(France) Kourou ELA-2		(France) Arianespace	
26 February; 22:44	(Saudi Arabia) Arabsat 3A	Arabsat	Geosynchronous	Communications	In orbit	Operational
26 February; 22:44	(United Kingdom) Skynet 4E	MoD	Geosynchronous	Communications	In orbit	Operational
28 February; 04:00	(Russia) Proton-K/DM-2		(Kazakhstan) Baikonur Site 81/23		(Russia)	
28 February; 04:00	(Russia) Raduga-1	MO RF	Geosynchronous	Communications	In orbit	Operational
=== March ===
5 March; 02:56	(United States) Pegasus-XL		(United States) Stargazer, Vandenberg		(United States) Orbital Sciences	
5 March; 02:56	(United States) WIRE	NASA	Low Earth	Infrared astronomy	10 May 2011	Spacecraft failure
5 March; 02:56	Coolant leak resulted in loss of control in orbit					
15 March; 03:06	(Russia) Soyuz-U/Ikar		(Kazakhstan) Baikonur Site 1/5		(France) (Russia) Starsem	
15 March; 03:06	(United States) Globalstar 22	Globalstar	Low Earth	Communications	In orbit	Operational
15 March; 03:06	(United States) Globalstar 41	Globalstar	Low Earth	Communications	In orbit	Operational
15 March; 03:06	(United States) Globalstar 46	Globalstar	Low Earth	Communications	In orbit	Operational
15 March; 03:06	(United States) Globalstar 37	Globalstar	Low Earth	Communications	In orbit	Operational
21 March; 00:09	(Russia) Proton-K/DM-2M		(Kazakhstan) Baikonur Site 81/23		(Russia) (United States) International Launch Services	
21 March; 00:09	(China) AsiaSat 3S	AsiaSat	Geosynchronous	Communications	In orbit	Operational
28 March; 01:29	(Ukraine) Zenit-3SL		(Norway) Ocean Odyssey		(United Nations) Sea Launch	
28 March; 01:29	(United Nations) DemoSat	Sea Launch	Geostationary transfer	Test launch vehicle	In orbit	Successful
28 March; 01:29	Maiden flight of Zenit-3SL					
=== April ===
2 April; 11:28	(Russia) Soyuz-U		(Kazakhstan) Baikonur Site 1/5		(Russia) Roskosmos	
2 April; 11:28	(Russia) Progress M-41	Roskosmos	Low Earth (Mir)	Logistics	17 July; 19:51	Successful
2 April; 11:28	(United States) Sputnik 99	AMSAT	Low Earth	Communications	29 July	Successful
2 April; 11:28	Sputnik 99 deployed from Mir during EVA on 16 April					
2 April; 22:03	(France) Ariane 4 42P		(France) Kourou ELA-2		(France) Arianespace	
2 April; 22:03	(India) INSAT-2E	ISRO	Geosynchronous	Communications	In orbit	Operational
9 April; 17:01	(United States) Titan IVB (402)/IUS		(United States) Cape Canaveral SLC-41		(United States) Lockheed Martin	
9 April; 17:01	(United States) USA-142 (DSP-19)	US Air Force	Intended: Geosynchronous; Achieved: Geostationary transfer	Early warning	In orbit	Launch failure
9 April; 17:01	Final Titan launch from SLC-41; IUS second stage failed to separate					
12 April; 22:50	(United States) Atlas IIAS		(United States) Cape Canaveral SLC-36A		(Russia) (United States) International Launch Services	
12 April; 22:50	(France) Eutelsat W3	Eutelsat	Geosynchronous	Communications	In orbit	Operational
15 April; 00:46	(Russia) Soyuz-U/Ikar		(Kazakhstan) Baikonur Site 1/5		(France) (Russia) Starsem	
15 April; 00:46	(United States) Globalstar 45	Globalstar	Low Earth	Communications	In orbit	Operational
15 April; 00:46	(United States) Globalstar 19	Globalstar	Low Earth	Communications	In orbit	Operational
15 April; 00:46	(United States) Globalstar 44	Globalstar	Low Earth	Communications	In orbit	Operational
15 April; 00:46	(United States) Globalstar 42	Globalstar	Low Earth	Communications	In orbit	Operational
15 April; 18:32	(United States) Delta II 7920-10		(United States) Vandenberg SLC-2W		(United States) Boeing IDS	
15 April; 18:32	(United States) Landsat 7	NASA/USGS	Low Earth	Remote sensing	In orbit	Operational
21 April; 04:59	(Ukraine) Dnepr		(Kazakhstan) Baikonur Site 109/95		(Russia) ISC Kosmotras	
21 April; 04:59	(United Kingdom) UoSAT-12	Surrey Satellite Technology	Low Earth	Technology development	In orbit	Successful
21 April; 04:59	Maiden flight of Dnepr					
27 April; 18:22	(United States) Athena II		(United States) Vandenberg SLC-6		(United States) Lockheed Martin	
27 April; 18:22	(United States) IKONOS 1	Space Imaging	Intended: Sun-synchronous	Earth imaging	27 April	Launch Failure
27 April; 18:22	Payload fairing failed to separate; Failed to orbit due to additional weight of the fairing					
28 April; 20:30	(Russia) Kosmos-3M		(Russia) Kapustin Yar Area 107		(Russia)	
28 April; 20:30	(Germany) ABRIXAS	DLR	Low Earth	X-ray astronomy	In orbit	Spacecraft failure
28 April; 20:30	Megsat-0	MegSat	Low Earth	Communications	4 October 2003	Successful
28 April; 20:30	ABRIXAS' power system failed three days after launch					
30 April; 16:30	(United States) Titan IVB (401)/Centaur		(United States) Cape Canaveral SLC-40		(United States) Lockheed Martin	
30 April; 16:30	(United States) USA-143 (Milstar-3)	US Air Force	Intended: Geosynchronous; Achieved: Medium Earth	Communications	In orbit	Launch Failure
30 April; 16:30	Centaur programming error led to three burns in a 90 minute period which were intended to be performed over a six-hour period. Payload stranded in a useless orbit.					
=== May ===
5 May; 01:00	(United States) Delta III 8930		(United States) Cape Canaveral SLC-17B		(United States) Boeing IDS	
5 May; 01:00	Orion 3	Loral Orion	Intended: Geosynchronous; Achieved: Medium Earth	Communications	In orbit	Launch Failure
5 May; 01:00	Upper stage engine failure resulted in payload being stranded in a useless orbit					
10 May; 01:22	(China) Long March 4B		(China) Taiyuan LC-1		(China) CASC	
10 May; 01:22	(China) Feng Yun 1C	CASC	Sun-synchronous	Weather satellite	12 January 2007	Successful
10 May; 01:22	(China) Shijian 5	CASC	Sun-synchronous	Magnetosphere research	In orbit	Operational
10 May; 01:22	Maiden flight of Long March 4B; FY-1C destroyed by ASAT after retirement					
18 May; 05:09	(United States) Pegasus-XL/HAPS		(United States) Stargazer, Vandenberg		(United States) Orbital Sciences	
18 May; 05:09	(United States) TERRIERS	NASA/Boston	Low Earth	Ionosphere research	In orbit	Spacecraft failure
18 May; 05:09	(United States) MUBLCOM	DARPA/US Army	Low Earth	Communications	In orbit	Operational
18 May; 05:09	TERRIERS solar panel failed to track the sun and the satellite's batteries exhausted their power supply on 20 May; MUBLCOM collided with DART but is still operational.					
20 May; 22:30	(Russia) Proton-K/DM-2M		(Kazakhstan) Baikonur Site 81/23		(Russia) (United States) International Launch Services	
20 May; 22:30	(Canada) Nimiq 1	Telesat	Geosynchronous	Communications	In orbit	Operational
22 May; 09:36	(United States) Titan IVB (404)		(United States) Vandenberg SLC-4E		(United States) Lockheed Martin	
22 May; 09:36	(United States) USA-144 (Misty-2)	NRO	Medium Earth	Reconnaissance	In orbit	Operational
26 May; 06:22	(India) PSLV		(India) Sriharikota FLP		(India) ISRO	
26 May; 06:22	(India) Oceansat-1	ISRO	Sun-synchronous	Oceanography	In orbit	Operational
26 May; 06:22	(South Korea) Kitsat-3	KAIST	Sun-synchronous		In orbit	Operational
26 May; 06:22	(Germany) DLR-Tubsat	DLR	Sun-synchronous	Technology development	In orbit	Operational
27 May; 10:49	(United States) Space Shuttle Discovery		(United States) Kennedy LC-39B		(United States) United Space Alliance	
27 May; 10:49	(United States) STS-96	NASA	Low Earth (ISS)	ISS assembly	6 June; 06:02	Successful
27 May; 10:49	(United States) SpaceHab Double Module	NASA/SpaceHab	Low Earth (Discovery)	Logistics	6 June; 06:02	Successful
27 May; 10:49	(United States) STARSHINE	NASA/NRL	Low Earth	Observation target	18 February 2000	Successful
27 May; 10:49	Crewed orbital flight with seven astronauts Starshine deployed from Discovery at 07:21 UTC on 5 June					
=== June ===
10 June; 13:48	(United States) Delta II 7420-10C		(United States) Cape Canaveral SLC-17B		(United States) Boeing IDS	
10 June; 13:48	(United States) Globalstar 25	Globalstar	Low Earth	Communications	In orbit	Operational
10 June; 13:48	(United States) Globalstar 49	Globalstar	Low Earth	Communications	In orbit	Operational
10 June; 13:48	(United States) Globalstar 47	Globalstar	Low Earth	Communications	In orbit	Operational
10 June; 13:48	(United States) Globalstar 52	Globalstar	Low Earth	Communications	In orbit	Operational
11 June; 17:15	(China) Long March 2C		(China) Taiyuan LC-1		(China)	
11 June; 17:15	(United States) Iridium 14A	Iridium	Low Earth	Communications	15 March 2019	Successful
11 June; 17:15	(United States) Iridium 21A	Iridium	Low Earth	Communications	24 May 2018	Successful
18 June; 01:49	(Russia) Proton-K/DM-2M		(Kazakhstan) Baikonur Site 81/23		(Russia) (United States) International Launch Services	
18 June; 01:49	(Luxembourg) Astra 1H	SES Astra	Geosynchronous	Communications	In orbit	Operational
20 June; 02:15	(United States) Titan 23G		(United States) Vandenberg SLC-4W		(United States) Lockheed Martin	
20 June; 02:15	(United States) QuickSCAT	NASA/NOAA	Sun-synchronous	Oceanography	In orbit	Operational
24 June; 15:44	(United States) Delta II 7320-10		(United States) Cape Canaveral SLC-17A		(United States) Boeing IDS	
24 June; 15:44	(United States) FUSE	NASA	Low Earth	Ultraviolet astronomy	In orbit	Successful
24 June; 15:44	Maiden flight of Delta II 7320; FUSE was deactivated on 18 October 2007					
=== July ===
5 July; 13:32	(Russia) Proton-K/Briz-M		(Kazakhstan) Baikonur Site 81/24		(Russia) RVSN	
5 July; 13:32	(Russia) Raduga	RVSN	Intended: Geosynchronous	Communications	5 July +45 seconds	Launch Failure
5 July; 13:32	Maiden flight of Briz-M upper stage Second stage exploded					
8 July; 08:45	(Russia) Molniya-M		(Russia) Plesetsk Site 43/3		(Russia)	
8 July; 08:45	(Russia) Molniya 3–50	MO RF	Molniya	Communications	In orbit	Operational
10 July; 08:45	(United States) Delta II 7420-10C		(United States) Cape Canaveral SLC-17B		(United States) Boeing IDS	
10 July; 08:45	(United States) Globalstar 35	Globalstar	Low Earth	Communications	In orbit	Operational
10 July; 08:45	(United States) Globalstar 32	Globalstar	Low Earth	Communications	In orbit	Operational
10 July; 08:45	(United States) Globalstar 51	Globalstar	Low Earth	Communications	In orbit	Operational
10 July; 08:45	(United States) Globalstar 30	Globalstar	Low Earth	Communications	In orbit	Operational
16 July; 16:39	(Russia) Soyuz-U		(Kazakhstan) Baikonur Site 1/5		(Russia) Roskosmos	
16 July; 16:39	(Russia) Progress M-42	Roskosmos	Low Earth (Mir)	Logistics	2 February 2000; 06:10	Successful
17 July; 06:38	(Ukraine) Zenit-2		(Kazakhstan) Baikonur Site 45/1		(Russia)	
17 July; 06:38	(Ukraine) Okean-O	RAKA/NKAU	Low Earth	Oceanography	In orbit	Operational
23 July; 04:31	(United States) Space Shuttle Columbia		(United States) Kennedy LC-39B		(United States) United Space Alliance	
23 July; 04:31	(United States) STS-93	NASA	Low Earth	Satellite deployment	28 July; 03:20	Successful
23 July; 04:31	(United States) Chandra X-ray Observatory	NASA	High Earth	X-ray astronomy	In orbit	Operational
23 July; 04:31	Crewed orbital flight with five astronauts First Shuttle mission with female commander (Eileen Collins); Engine control failures and fuel leak during ascent resulted in lower orbit than planned and IUS underperformance resulted in lower orbit than planned for Chandra, IPS used to raise orbit, reducing lifespan Chandra deployed by Columbia at 11:47 UTC on 23 July					
25 July; 07:46	(United States) Delta II 7420-10C		(United States) Cape Canaveral SLC-17A		(United States) Boeing IDS	
25 July; 07:46	(United States) Globalstar 48	Globalstar	Low Earth	Communications	In orbit	Operational
25 July; 07:46	(United States) Globalstar 26	Globalstar	Low Earth	Communications	In orbit	Operational
25 July; 07:46	(United States) Globalstar 43	Globalstar	Low Earth	Communications	In orbit	Operational
25 July; 07:46	(United States) Globalstar 28	Globalstar	Low Earth	Communications	In orbit	Operational
=== August ===
12 August; 22:52	(France) Ariane 4 42P		(France) Kourou ELA-2		(France) Arianespace	
12 August; 22:52	(Indonesia) Telkom 1	PT Telkom	Geosynchronous	Communications	In orbit	Operational
17 August; 04:37	(United States) Delta II 7420-10C		(United States) Cape Canaveral SLC-17B		(United States) Boeing IDS	
17 August; 04:37	(United States) Globalstar 24	Globalstar	Low Earth	Communications	In orbit	Operational
17 August; 04:37	(United States) Globalstar 27	Globalstar	Low Earth	Communications	In orbit	Operational
17 August; 04:37	(United States) Globalstar 54	Globalstar	Low Earth	Communications	In orbit	Operational
17 August; 04:37	(United States) Globalstar 53	Globalstar	Low Earth	Communications	In orbit	Operational
18 August; 18:00	(Russia) Soyuz-U		(Russia) Plesetsk Site 43/3		(Russia)	
18 August; 18:00	(Russia) Kosmos 2365 (Yantar-4K1)	MO RF	Low Earth	Reconnaissance	15 December	Successful
26 August; 12:02	(Russia) Kosmos-3M		(Russia) Plesetsk Site 132/1		(Russia)	
26 August; 12:02	(Russia) Kosmos 2366 (Parus)	MO RF	Low Earth	Navigation	In orbit	Operational
=== September ===
4 September; 22:34	(France) Ariane 4 42P		(France) Kourou ELA-2		(France) Arianespace	
4 September; 22:34	(South Korea) Koreasat 3	Korea Telecom	Geosynchronous	Communications	In orbit	Operational
6 September; 16:36	(Russia) Proton-K/DM-2M		(Kazakhstan) Baikonur Site 81/23		(Russia)	
6 September; 16:36	(Russia) Yamal 101	Gazcom	Operational: Geosynchronous; Current: Graveyard	Communications	In orbit	Spacecraft failure
6 September; 16:36	(Russia) Yamal 102	Gazcom	Geosynchronous	Communications	In orbit	Operational
9 September; 18:00	(Russia) Soyuz-U		(Russia) Plesetsk Site 43/4		(Russia)	
9 September; 18:00	(Russia) Foton 12	RAKA/ESA	Low Earth	Microgravity research	24 September	Successful
22 September; 14:33	(Russia) Soyuz-U/Ikar		(Kazakhstan) Baikonur Site 1/5		(France) (Russia) Starsem	
22 September; 14:33	(United States) Globalstar 58	Globalstar	Low Earth	Communications	In orbit	Operational
22 September; 14:33	(United States) Globalstar 50	Globalstar	Low Earth	Communications	In orbit	Operational
22 September; 14:33	(United States) Globalstar 33	Globalstar	Low Earth	Communications	In orbit	Operational
22 September; 14:33	(United States) Globalstar 55	Globalstar	Low Earth	Communications	In orbit	Operational
23 September; 06:02	(United States) Atlas IIAS		(United States) Cape Canaveral SLC-36A		(Russia) (United States) International Launch Services	
23 September; 06:02	(United States) Echostar 5	EchoStar	Geosynchronous	Communications	In orbit	Operational
24 September; 18:21	(United States) Athena II		(United States) Vandenberg SLC-6		(United States) Lockheed Martin	
24 September; 18:21	(United States) Ikonos 2	Space Imaging	Sun-synchronous	Earth imaging	In orbit	Operational
24 September; 18:21	Final flight of Athena II					
25 September; 06:29	(France) Ariane 4 44P		(France) Kourou ELA-2		(France) Arianespace	
25 September; 06:29	(United States) Telstar 7	Loral Skynet	Geosynchronous	Communications	In orbit	Operational
26 September; 22:30	(Russia) Proton-K/DM-2M		(Kazakhstan) Baikonur Site 81/23		(Russia) (United States) International Launch Services	
26 September; 22:30	(United States) LMI-1	LMI	Geosynchronous	Communications	In orbit	Operational
28 September; 11:00	(Russia) Soyuz-U		(Russia) Plesetsk Site 43/4		(Russia)	
28 September; 11:00	(Russia) Resurs F-1M	Roskosmos	Low Earth	Remote sensing	22 October	Successful
=== October ===
7 October; 12:51	(United States) Delta II 7925-9.5		(United States) Cape Canaveral SLC-17A		(United States) Boeing IDS	
7 October; 12:51	(United States) USA-145 (GPS IIR-3)	US Air Force	Medium Earth	Navigation	In orbit	Successful
10 October; 03:28	(Ukraine) Zenit-3SL		(Norway) Ocean Odyssey		(United Nations) Sea Launch	
10 October; 03:28	(United States) DirecTV-1R	DirecTV	Geosynchronous	Communications	In orbit	Operational
14 October; 03:15	(China) Long March 4B		(China) Taiyuan LC-1		(China) CASC	
14 October; 03:15	(China) (Brazil) Ziyuan 1	CAST/INPE	Low Earth	Remote sensing	In orbit	Partial satellite failure
14 October; 03:15	(Brazil) SACI-1	INPE	Low Earth	Technology development	In orbit	Spacecraft failure
14 October; 03:15	Ziyuan 1 Wide field camera failed 177 days after launch; SACI 1 ceased communications less than a month after launch					
18 October; 13:22	(Russia) Soyuz-U/Ikar		(Kazakhstan) Baikonur Site 1/5		(France) (Russia) Starsem	
18 October; 13:22	(United States) Globalstar 57	Globalstar	Low Earth	Communications	In orbit	Operational
18 October; 13:22	(United States) Globalstar 59	Globalstar	Low Earth	Communications	In orbit	Operational
18 October; 13:22	(United States) Globalstar 56	Globalstar	Low Earth	Communications	In orbit	Operational
18 October; 13:22	(United States) Globalstar 31	Globalstar	Low Earth	Communications	In orbit	Operational
19 October; 06:22	(France) Ariane 4 44LP		(France) Kourou ELA-2		(France) Arianespace	
19 October; 06:22	Orion 2	Loral Orion	Geosynchronous	Communications	In orbit	Operational
27 October; 16:16	(Russia) Proton-K/DM-2		(Kazakhstan) Baikonur Site 200/39		(Russia)	
27 October; 16:16	(Russia) Ekspress-A1	AO Komichekaya	Intended: Geosynchronous	Communications	27 October	Launch Failure
27 October; 16:16	Second stage malfunction					
=== November ===
13 November; 22:52	(France) Ariane 4 44LP		(France) Kourou ELA-2		(France) Arianespace	
13 November; 22:52	(United States) GE 4	GE Americom	Geosynchronous	Communications	In orbit	Operational
15 November; 07:29	(Japan) H-II		(Japan) Tanegashima LA-Y1		(Japan) NASDA	
15 November; 07:29	(Japan) MTSAT	NASDA	Intended: Geosynchronous	Weather/Communications	15 November	Launch Failure
15 November; 07:29	Final flight of H-II; First stage malfunction					
19 November; 22:30	(China) Long March 2F		(China) Jiuquan SLS		(China) CASC	
19 November; 22:30	(China) Shenzhou 1	CMSA	Low Earth	Test spacecraft	20 November; 19:41	Successful
19 November; 22:30	Maiden flight of Long March 2F and Shenzhou spacecraft. First mission of China Manned Space Program.					
22 November; 16:20	(Russia) Soyuz-U/Ikar		(Kazakhstan) Baikonur Site 1/5		(France) (Russia) Starsem	
22 November; 16:20	(United States) Globalstar 39	Globalstar	Low Earth	Communications	In orbit	Operational
22 November; 16:20	(United States) Globalstar 34	Globalstar	Low Earth	Communications	In orbit	Operational
22 November; 16:20	(United States) Globalstar 29	Globalstar	Low Earth	Communications	In orbit	Operational
22 November; 16:20	(United States) Globalstar 61	Globalstar	Low Earth	Communications	In orbit	Operational
23 November; 04:06	(United States) Atlas IIA		(United States) Cape Canaveral SLC-36B		(United States)	
23 November; 04:06	(United States) USA-146 (UHF F/O F10)	US Navy	Geosynchronous	Communications	In orbit	Operational
=== December ===
3 December; 16:22	(France) Ariane 4 40		(France) Kourou ELA-2		(France) Arianespace	
3 December; 16:22	(France) Hélios 1B	French government	Low Earth	Reconnaissance	In orbit	Successful
3 December; 16:22	(France) Clementine	DGA	Low Earth	SIGINT	In orbit	Operational
3 December; 16:22	Final flight of Ariane 4 40; Hélios 1B decommissioned in October 2004					
4 December; 18:53	(United States) Pegasus-XL/HAPS		(United States) Stargazer, Wallops Island		(United States) Orbital Sciences	
4 December; 18:53	(United States) Orbcomm 30	Orbcomm	Low Earth	Communications	In orbit	Operational
4 December; 18:53	(United States) Orbcomm 31	Orbcomm	Low Earth	Communications	In orbit	Operational
4 December; 18:53	(United States) Orbcomm 32	Orbcomm	Low Earth	Communications	In orbit	Operational
4 December; 18:53	(United States) Orbcomm 33	Orbcomm	Low Earth	Communications	In orbit	Operational
4 December; 18:53	(United States) Orbcomm 34	Orbcomm	Low Earth	Communications	In orbit	Operational
4 December; 18:53	(United States) Orbcomm 35	Orbcomm	Low Earth	Communications	In orbit	Operational
4 December; 18:53	(United States) Orbcomm 36	Orbcomm	Low Earth	Communications	In orbit	Operational
10 December; 14:32	(France) Ariane 5G		(France) Kourou ELA-3		(France) Arianespace	
10 December; 14:32	XMM-Newton	ESA	High Earth	X-ray Astronomy	In orbit	Operational
11 December; 18:25	(Brazil) VLS-1	VLS-1 V02	(Brazil) Alcântara		(Brazil) INPE	
11 December; 18:25	(Brazil) SACI-2	INPE	Intended: Low Earth	Technology development	11 December	Launch Failure
11 December; 18:25	Self-destruct activated 3 minutes into the flight					
12 December; 17:38	(United States) Titan II 23G		(United States) Vandenberg SLC-4W		(United States) Lockheed Martin	
12 December; 17:38	(United States) USA-147 (DMSP 5D3 F15)	US Air force	Sun-synchronous	Weather satellite	In orbit	Operational
18 December; 18:57	(United States) Atlas IIAS		(United States) Vandenberg SLC-3E		(United States)	
18 December; 18:57	(United States) Terra	NASA	Sun-synchronous	Earth observation	In orbit	Operational
20 December; 00:50	(United States) Space Shuttle Discovery		(United States) Kennedy LC-39B		(United States) United Space Alliance	
20 December; 00:50	(United States) STS-103	NASA	Low Earth (HST)	HST Servicing	28 December; 00:01	Successful
20 December; 00:50	Crewed orbital flight with seven astronauts Hubble Space Telescope Servicing Mission 3A					
21 December; 07:13	(United States) Taurus 2110		(United States) Vandenberg LC-576E		(United States) Orbital Sciences	
21 December; 07:13	(South Korea) KOMPSAT	KAIST	Sun-synchronous	Ocean colour sensor	In orbit	Successful
21 December; 07:13	(United States) ACRIMSAT	NASA	Sun-synchronous	Solar research	In orbit	Operational
21 December; 07:13	(United States) Celestis-03	Celestis	Sun-synchronous	Space burial	In orbit	Successful
21 December; 07:13	Contact with KOMPSAT lost on 6 January 2008					
22 December; 00:50	(France) Ariane 4 44L		(France) Kourou ELA-2		(France) Arianespace	
22 December; 00:50	(United States) Galaxy 11	PanAmSat	Geosynchronous	Communications	In orbit	Operational
24 December	(Russia) Rokot/Briz-K		(Russia) Plesetsk Site 133		(Russia) RVSN	
24 December	(Russia) RVSN-40	RVSN	Planned: MEO	Satellite navigation test	Failed on launch pad	Launch Failure
26 December; 08:00	(Ukraine) Tsyklon-2		(Kazakhstan) Baikonur Site 90/20		(Russia)	
26 December; 08:00	(Russia) Kosmos 2367 (US-PM)	Russian Navy	Low Earth	SIGINT	19 July 2002	Successful
27 December; 19:12	(Russia) Molniya-M		(Russia) Plesetsk Site 16/2		(Russia)	
27 December; 19:12	(Russia) Kosmos 2368 (Oko)	VKS	Molniya	Early warning	In orbit	Operational

- ← Jan
- Feb
- Mar
- Apr
- May
- Jun
- Jul
- Aug
- Sep
- Oct
- Nov
- Dec →

== Suborbital launches ==
- ← Jan
- Feb
- Mar
- Apr
- May
- Jun
- Jul
- Aug
- Sep
- Oct
- Nov
- Dec →

Date and time (UTC)	Rocket	Flight number	Launch site		LSP	
Date and time (UTC)	Payload (⚀ = CubeSat)	Operator	Orbit	Function	Decay (UTC)	Outcome
Date and time (UTC)	Remarks					
=== January ===
15 January	(Pakistan) Shaheen 1		(Pakistan) Sonmiani		(Pakistan) PAF	
15 January		PAF	Suborbital	Missile test	15 January	Failure
15 January	Maiden flight of Shaheen 1					
21 January; 06:13	(Canada) Black Brant XII		(Norway) Andøya		(United States) NASA	
21 January; 06:13	(United States) CAPER	NASA	Suborbital	Ionosphere research	21 January	Successful
22 January; 13:57	(Canada) Black Brant XII		(United States) Poker Flat		(United States) NASA	
22 January; 13:57	(United States) APEX (North Star)	NASA	Suborbital	Plasma research	22 January	Successful
22 January; 15:20	(Canada) Black Brant VB		(United States) Poker Flat		(United States) NASA	
22 January; 15:20	(United States)	NASA	Suborbital	Ionosphere research	22 January	Successful
22 January; 15:31	(United States) Taurus-Orion		(United States) Poker Flat		(United States) NASA	
22 January; 15:31	(United States)	NASA	Suborbital	Ionosphere research	22 January	Successful
=== February ===
2 February; 01:30	(Japan) S-310		(Japan) Uchinoura LC-K		(Japan) ISAS	
2 February; 01:30			Suborbital	Ionosphere and X-ray research	2 February	Successful
9 February	(United States) Trident D-5		(United States) Submarine, Eastern Test Range		(United States) US Navy	
9 February		US Navy	Suborbital	Missile test	9 February	Successful
9 February	(United States) Trident D-5		(United States) Submarine, Eastern Test Range		(United States) US Navy	
9 February		US Navy	Suborbital	Missile test	9 February	Successful
10 February; 08:06	(United States) Minuteman III		(United States) Vandenberg LF-04		(United States) US Air Force	
10 February; 08:06		US Air Force	Suborbital	Missile test	10 February	Successful
11 February; 06:45	(Canada) Black Brant X		(United States) Poker Flat		(United States) NASA	
11 February; 06:45	(United States) ENSTROPHY	NASA	Suborbital	Ionosphere research	11 February	Successful
20 February; 04:45	(Canada) Black Brant IX		(United States) White Sands		(United States) NASA	
20 February; 04:45	(United States) SPINR	NASA	Suborbital	Ultraviolet astronomy	20 February	Successful
=== March ===
10 March; 08:01	(United States) Peacekeeper		(United States) Vandenberg LF-02		(United States) US Air Force	
10 March; 08:01		US Air Force	Suborbital	Missile test	10 March	Successful
15 March; 09:52	(Brazil) VS-30		(Brazil) Alcântara		(Brazil) AEB	
15 March; 09:52	(Brazil) Operacao San Marcos	AEB	Suborbital	Microgravity research	15 March	Successful
23 March	(United States) Trident C-4		(United States) Submarine, Eastern Test Range		(United States) US Navy	
23 March		US Navy	Suborbital	Missile test	23 March	Successful
23 March	(United States) Trident C-4		(United States) Submarine, Eastern Test Range		(United States) US Navy	
23 March		US Navy	Suborbital	Missile test	23 March	Successful
25 March	(United States) Trident C-4		(United States) Submarine, Eastern Test Range		(United States) US Navy	
25 March		US Navy	Suborbital	Missile test	25 March	Successful
25 March	(United States) Trident C-4		(United States) Submarine, Eastern Test Range		(United States) US Navy	
25 March		US Navy	Suborbital	Missile test	25 March	Successful
28 March; 09:00	(Canada) Black Brant VIIIC		(United States) White Sands		(United States) NASA	
28 March; 09:00	(United States)	NASA	Suborbital	X-ray astronomy	28 March	Successful
29 March; 12:06	(United States) Hera		(United States) White Sands LC-94		(United States) US Air Force	
29 March; 12:06		US Air Force	Suborbital	ABM target	28 March	Successful
29 March; 12:13	(United States) THAAD		(United States) White Sands		(United States) US Air Force	
29 March; 12:13		US Air Force	Suborbital	ABM Interceptor	29 March	Successful
31 March; 00:15	(United States) SR19		(United States) C-130, Pacific Missile Range		(United States) US Air Force	
31 March; 00:15		US Air Force	Suborbital	SRALT test	31 March	Successful
=== April ===
1 April	(Russia) R-29		(Russia) Submarine, Barents Sea		(Russia) Russian Navy	
1 April		Russian Navy	Suborbital	Missile test	1 April	Successful
11 April; 04:17	(India) Agni-II		(India) Balasore IC-4		(India) IDRDL	
11 April; 04:17		IDRDL	Suborbital	Missile test	11 April	Successful
11 April; 04:17	Maiden flight of Agni-II					
12 April; 06:35	(Canada) Black Brant IX		(United States) White Sands		(United States) NASA	
12 April; 06:35	(United States)	NASA	Suborbital	Ultraviolet astronomy	12 April	Successful
14 April; 05:35	(Pakistan) Ghauri-II		(Pakistan) Tilla		(Pakistan) PAF	
14 April; 05:35		PAF	Suborbital	Missile test	14 April	Successful
14 April; 05:35	Maiden flight of Ghauri-II					
15 April; 04:58	(Pakistan) Shaheen 1		(Pakistan) Sonmiani		(Pakistan) PAF	
15 April; 04:58		PAF	Suborbital	Missile test	15 April	Successful
26 April	(United States) Trident D-5		(United States) Submarine, Eastern Test Range		(United States) US Navy	
26 April		US Navy	Suborbital	Missile test	26 April	Successful
26 April	(United States) Trident D-5		(United States) Submarine, Eastern Test Range		(United States) US Navy	
26 April		US Navy	Suborbital	Missile test	26 April	Successful
=== May ===
4 May	(France) M4		(France) Submarine, Bay of Biscay		(France) French Navy	
4 May		French Navy	Suborbital	Missile test	4 May	Successful
4 May	(France) M4		(France) Submarine, Bay of Biscay		(France) French Navy	
4 May		French Navy	Suborbital	Missile test	4 May	Successful
7 May; 20:00	(Canada) Black Brant IX		(United States) White Sands		(United States) NASA	
7 May; 20:00	(United States) VAULT	NASA	Suborbital	Ultraviolet astronomy	7 May	Successful
14 May; 11:33	(United Kingdom) Skylark VII		(Sweden) Esrange LC-S		(Sweden) SSC	
14 May; 11:33	(Sweden) MASER 8	SSC	Suborbital	Microgravity research	14 May	Successful
=== June ===
3 June; 14:20	(Russia) Topol M		(Russia) Plesetsk Site 158		(Russia) RVSN	
3 June; 14:20		RVSN	Suborbital	Missile test	3 June	Successful
10 June; 11:07	(United States) Hera		(United States) White Sands LC-94		(United States) US Air Force	
10 June; 11:07		US Air Force	Suborbital	ABM target	10 June	Successful
10 June; 11:14	(United States) THAAD		(United States) White Sands		(United States) US Air Force	
10 June; 11:14		US Air Force	Suborbital	ABM Interceptor	10 June	Successful
14 June; 07:40	(Canada) Black Brant IX		(United States) White Sands		(United States) NASA	
14 June; 07:40	(United States)	NASA	Suborbital	Ultraviolet astronomy	14 June	Successful
24 June; 17:00	(Canada) Black Brant IX		(United States) White Sands		(United States) NASA	
24 June; 17:00	(United States) SERTS-99	NASA	Suborbital	Solar observation	24 June	Successful
=== July ===
1 July	(United States) Malemute II		(United States) Pacific Missile Range		(United States) US Navy	
1 July	(United States) Slugger	US Navy	Suborbital	TMBD target	1 July	Successful
5 July; 03:57	(Canada) Black Brant VC		(United States) Wallops Island		(United States) NASA	
5 July; 03:57	(United States)	NASA	Suborbital	Ionosphere research	5 July	Successful
5 July; 04:02	(United States) Taurus-Orion		(United States) Wallops Island		(United States) NASA	
5 July; 04:02	(United States)	NASA	Suborbital	Ionosphere research	5 July	Successful
5 July; 23:36	(Canada) Black Brant VA		(Norway) Andøya		(United States) NASA	
5 July; 23:36	(United States) MD-DR-04 DROPPS-1	NASA	Suborbital	Aeronomy research	5 July	Successful
14 July; 03:28	(Canada) Black Brant VA		(Norway) Andøya		(United States) NASA	
14 July; 03:28	(United States) MD-DR-13 DROPPS-2	NASA	Suborbital	Aeronomy research	14 July	Successful
18 July; 03:31	(United States) Taurus-Orion		(United States) Wallops Island		(United States) NASA	
18 July; 03:31	(United States)	NASA	Suborbital	Ionosphere research	18 July	Successful
27 July; 22:48	(Canada) Black Brant VB		(Sweden) Esrange		(United States) NASA	
27 July; 22:48	(United States) ICON	NASA	Suborbital	Ionosphere research	27 July	Successful
=== August ===
2 August	(China) DF-31		(China) Taiyuan		(China) CASC	
2 August		CASC	Suborbital	Missile test	2 August	Successful
2 August; 11:37	(United States) Hera		(United States) White Sands LC-94		(United States) US Air Force	
2 August; 11:37		US Air Force	Suborbital	ABM target	2 August	Successful
2 August; 11:44	(United States) THAAD		(United States) White Sands		(United States) US Air Force	
2 August; 11:44		US Air Force	Suborbital	ABM Interceptor	2 August	Successful
18 August; 18:05	(Canada) Black Brant 9CM1		(United States) White Sands LC-43		(United States) NASA	
18 August; 18:05	(United States)	NASA	Suborbital	Solar research	18 August	Successful
18 August; 18:05	Data used to calibrate SOHO spacecraft					
20 August; 08:45	(United States) Minuteman III		(United States) Vandenberg LF-10		(United States) US Air Force	
20 August; 08:45	(United States) RCT-1 GT-170GM/RRF-6	US Air Force	Suborbital	Missile test	20 August	Successful
20 August; 11:27	(United States) Minuteman III		(United States) Vandenberg LF-09		(United States) US Air Force	
20 August; 11:27	(United States) FOT GT-171GM	US Air Force	Suborbital	Missile test	20 August	Successful
24 August; 07:07	(Canada) Black Brant IX		(United States) White Sands		(United States) NASA	
24 August; 07:07	(United States)	NASA	Suborbital	Ultraviolet astronomy	24 August	Successful
29 August	(Russia) Kosmos-3MR		(Russia) Kapustin Yar Area 107		(Russia) RVSN	
29 August	(Russia) Re-entry vehicle	RVSN	Suborbital	Test RV	29 August	Failure
=== September ===
3 September; 11:44	(Russia) Topol M		(Russia) Plesetsk Site 158		(Russia) RVSN	
3 September; 11:44		RVSN	Suborbital	Missile test	3 September	Successful
6 September	(United States) SR-19		(United States) Aircraft, Wake Island		(United States) Orbital Sciences	
6 September	(United States) TCMP-3A	US Air Force	Suborbital	Test re-entry vehicle	6 September	Successful
15 September; 21:00	(United States) Castor M57A1		(United States) Kodiak		(United States)	
15 September; 21:00		US Air Force	Suborbital	Test flight	15 September	Successful
24 September	(United States) SM-3		(United States) USS Shiloh, Pacific Missile Range		(United States) US Navy	
24 September		US Navy	Suborbital	Missile test	24 September	Successful
27 September; 10:00	(Canada) Black Brant IX		(United States) White Sands		(United States) NASA	
27 September; 10:00	(United States)	NASA	Suborbital	Ultraviolet astronomy	27 September	Successful
=== October ===
1 October	(Russia) R-29		(Russia) Submarine, Sea of Okhotsk		(Russia) Russian Navy	
1 October		Russian Navy	Suborbital	Missile test	1 October	Successful
1 October; 08:42	(Russia) Topol M		(Russia) Plesetsk Site 158		(Russia) RVSN	
1 October; 08:42		RVSN	Suborbital	Missile test	1 October	Successful
2 October	(Russia) R-29		(Russia) Submarine, Sea of Okhotsk		(Russia) Russian Navy	
2 October		Russian Navy	Suborbital	Missile test	2 October	Successful
3 October; 02:01	(United States) Minuteman II		(United States) Vandenberg LF-03		(United States) US Air Force	
3 October; 02:01	(United States) MSLS IFT-2	US Air Force	Suborbital	ABM target	3 October	Successful
3 October; 02:22	(United States) PLV		(Marshall Islands) Meck Island, Kwajalein Atoll		(United States) US Air Force	
3 October; 02:22	(United States) EKV	US Air Force	Suborbital	ABM test	3 October	Successful
20 October	(Russia) UR-100N		(Kazakhstan) Baikonur Site 175		(Russia) RVSN	
20 October		RVSN	Suborbital	Missile test	20 October	Successful
=== November ===
November	A-350R		(Kazakhstan) Sary Shagan		PRO Противоракетная оборона (ПРО)	
November			Suborbital	Missile test	Within one hour	Successful
1 November	(India) RH-300		(India) Sriharikota		(India) ISRO	
1 November	(India) EWS	ISRO	Suborbital	Ionosphere research	1 November	Successful
10 November	(United States) Trident D-5		(United States) Submarine, Eastern Test Range		(United States) US Navy	
10 November		US Navy	Suborbital	Missile test	10 November	Successful
10 November	(United States) Trident D-5		(United States) Submarine, Eastern Test Range		(United States) US Navy	
10 November		US Navy	Suborbital	Missile test	10 November	Successful
13 November; 08:20	(United States) Minuteman III		(United States) Vandenberg LF-26		(United States) US Air Force	
13 November; 08:20	(United States) PRP FTM-01	US Air Force	Suborbital	Missile test	13 November	Successful
17 November	(Russia) R-39		(Russia) Submarine, Barents Sea		(Russia) Russian Navy	
17 November		Russian Navy	Suborbital	Missile test	17 November	Successful
17 November	(Russia) R-39		(Russia) Submarine, Barents Sea		(Russia) Russian Navy	
17 November		Russian Navy	Suborbital	Missile test	17 November	Successful
18 November; 01:55	(India) RH-300 MK-II		(India) Sriharikota		(India) ISRO	
18 November; 01:55	(India) LMS	ISRO	Suborbital	Ionosphere/Meteor research	18 November	Successful
20 November; 01:35	(India) RH-300 MK-II		(India) Sriharikota		(India) ISRO	
20 November; 01:35	(India) LMS	ISRO	Suborbital	Ionosphere/Meteor research	20 November	Successful
=== December ===
14 December; 08:05	(Russia) Topol M		(Russia) Plesetsk Site 158		(Russia) RVSN	
14 December; 08:05		RVSN	Suborbital	Missile test	14 December	Successful
17 December; 17:00	(United States) Terrier-Orion		(United States) Wallops Island		(United States) NASA	
17 December; 17:00	(United States) MG.Pool Boiling	NASA	Suborbital	Microgravity research	17 December	Successful

- ← Jan
- Feb
- Mar
- Apr
- May
- Jun
- Jul
- Aug
- Sep
- Oct
- Nov
- Dec →

== Deep Space Rendezvous ==
Date (GMT)	Spacecraft	Event	Remarks
1 February	Galileo	11th flyby of Europa	
5 May	Galileo	4th flyby of Callisto	
24 June	Cassini	2nd flyby of Venus	Gravity assist; Closest approach: 598 kilometres (372 mi)
30 June	Galileo	5th flyby of Callisto	
29 July	Deep Space 1	Flyby of 9969 Braille	
31 July	Lunar Prospector	Deliberate impact of the Moon	
14 August	Galileo	6th flyby of Callisto	
18 August	Cassini	Flyby of the Earth	Gravity assist; Closest approach: 1,166 kilometres (725 mi)
16 September	Galileo	7th flyby of Callisto	
23 September	Mars Climate Orbiter	Burned up in the Martian atmosphere	
11 October	Galileo	1st flyby of Io	
26 November	Galileo	2nd flyby of Io	
3 December	Mars Polar Lander	Crash-landed at Planum Australe, Mars	
3 December	Amundsen and Scott	Subprobes lost in Mars Polar Lander crash-landing	

== EVAs ==
Start date/time	Duration	End time	Spacecraft	Crew	Function	Remarks
16 April; 04:37	6 hours 19 minutes	10:56	Mir EO-27; Kvant-2	(Russia) Viktor Afanasyev (France) Jean-Pierre Haigneré	Recovered experiments from the exterior of Mir and installed other experiments on the outer surface.	
30 May; 02:56	7 hours 55 minutes	10:51	STS-96; ISS Discovery	(United States) Tamara E. Jernigan (United States) Daniel T. Barry	Transferred and installed two cranes from the shuttle's payload bay to locations on the outside of the station. Installed two new portable foot restraints that will fit both American and Russian space boots, and attached three bags filled with tools and handrails that will be used during future assembly operations.	
23 July; 11:06	6 hours 7 minutes	17:13	Mir EO-27; Kvant-2	(Russia) Viktor Afanasyev (Russia) Sergei Avdeyev	Installed a communications antenna on the Sofora girder, and attempted to find a leak in Kvant-2. Retrieved the Exobiology and Dvikon experiments.	
28 July; 09:37	5 hours 22 minutes	14:59	Mir EO-27; Kvant-2	(Russia) Viktor Afanasyev (Russia) Sergei Avdeyev	Completed the deployment of the antenna mounted on the Sofora girder and pushed it into space. Installed the experiments Indicator and Sprut-4, traded out tape cassettes on the Migmas ion spectromer and recovered the Danko-M and Ekran-D experiments for return to Earth.	
22 December; 18:54	8 hours 15 minutes	23 December; 03:09	STS-103; Discovery	(United States) Steven Smith (United States) John M. Grunsfeld	Replaced three Rate Sensor Units, installed Voltage/Temperature Improvement Kits on all six batteries.	Hubble Space Telescope servicing
23 December; 19:06	8 hours 10 minutes	24 December; 03:16	STS-103; Discovery	(United Kingdom) / (United States) Michael Foale (Switzerland) Claude Nicollier	Replaced the telescope's central computer and a Fine Guidance Sensor.	Hubble Space Telescope servicing
24 December; 19:17	8 hours 8 minutes	25 December; 03:25	STS-103; Discovery	(United States) Steven Smith (United States) John M. Grunsfeld	Installed a transmitter and a solid state recorder.	Hubble Space Telescope servicing
