= Progress M-41 =

Russian cargo spacecraft

- A Progress-M spacecraft
- Mission type: Mir resupply
- COSPAR ID: 1999-015A
- SATCAT no.: 25664

Spacecraft properties
- Spacecraft: Progress (No.241)
- Spacecraft type: Progress-M
- Manufacturer: RKK Energia

Start of mission
- Launch date: 2 April 1999, 11:28:43 UTC
- Rocket: Soyuz-U
- Launch site: Baikonur, Site 1/5

End of mission
- Disposal: Deorbited
- Decay date: 17 July 1999, 19:51 UTC

Orbital parameters
- Reference system: Geocentric
- Regime: Low Earth
- Perigee altitude: 194 km
- Apogee altitude: 249 km
- Inclination: 51.6°
- Period: 88.6 minutes
- Epoch: 2 April 1999

Docking with Mir
- Docking port: Kvant-1 aft
- Docking date: 4 April 1999, 12:46:50 UTC
- Undocking date: 17 July 1999, 11:24 UTC

Progress M-41 (Russian: Прогресс M-41) was a Russian unmanned Progress cargo spacecraft, which was launched in April 1999 to resupply the Mir space station and carry the Sputnik 99 satellite.

== Launch ==
Progress M-41 launched on 2 April 1999 from the Baikonur Cosmodrome in Kazakhstan. It used a Soyuz-U rocket.

== Docking ==
Progress M-41 docked with the aft port of the Kvant-1 module of Mir on 4 April 1999 at 12:46:50 UTC, and was undocked on 17 July 1999 at 11:24 UTC.

== Decay ==
It remained in orbit until 17 July 1999, when it was deorbited. The mission ended at 19:51 UTC.

== See also ==
- 1999 in spaceflight
- List of Progress missions
- List of uncrewed spaceflights to Mir
