= Exoatmospheric Reentry-vehicle Interceptor Subsystem =

American ICBM-defense technology

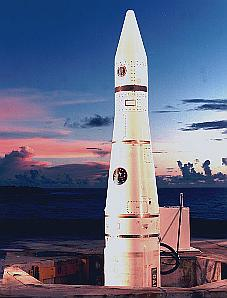
Lockheed ERIS Anti-Ballistic Missile

The Exoatmospheric Reentry-vehicle Interceptor Subsystem, or ERIS, program, was a component of the United States' Strategic Defense Initiative during the Cold War. The ERIS system was named after Eris, Greek goddess of strife. ERIS was a kinetic kill system, launched from a ground-based system, and impacting directly to destroy an incoming Intercontinental ballistic missile (ICBM) before the targeted ICBM re-entered the Earth's atmosphere.

== Background ==
The 1972 Anti-Ballistic Missile Treaty between the U.S. and the Soviet Union permitted each nation to have two ABM sites, each limited to 100 missiles, for a total of 200 ABMs per nation. A 1976 Protocol added to the ABM treaty further limited each nation to a single, 100 missile site.

== Development ==
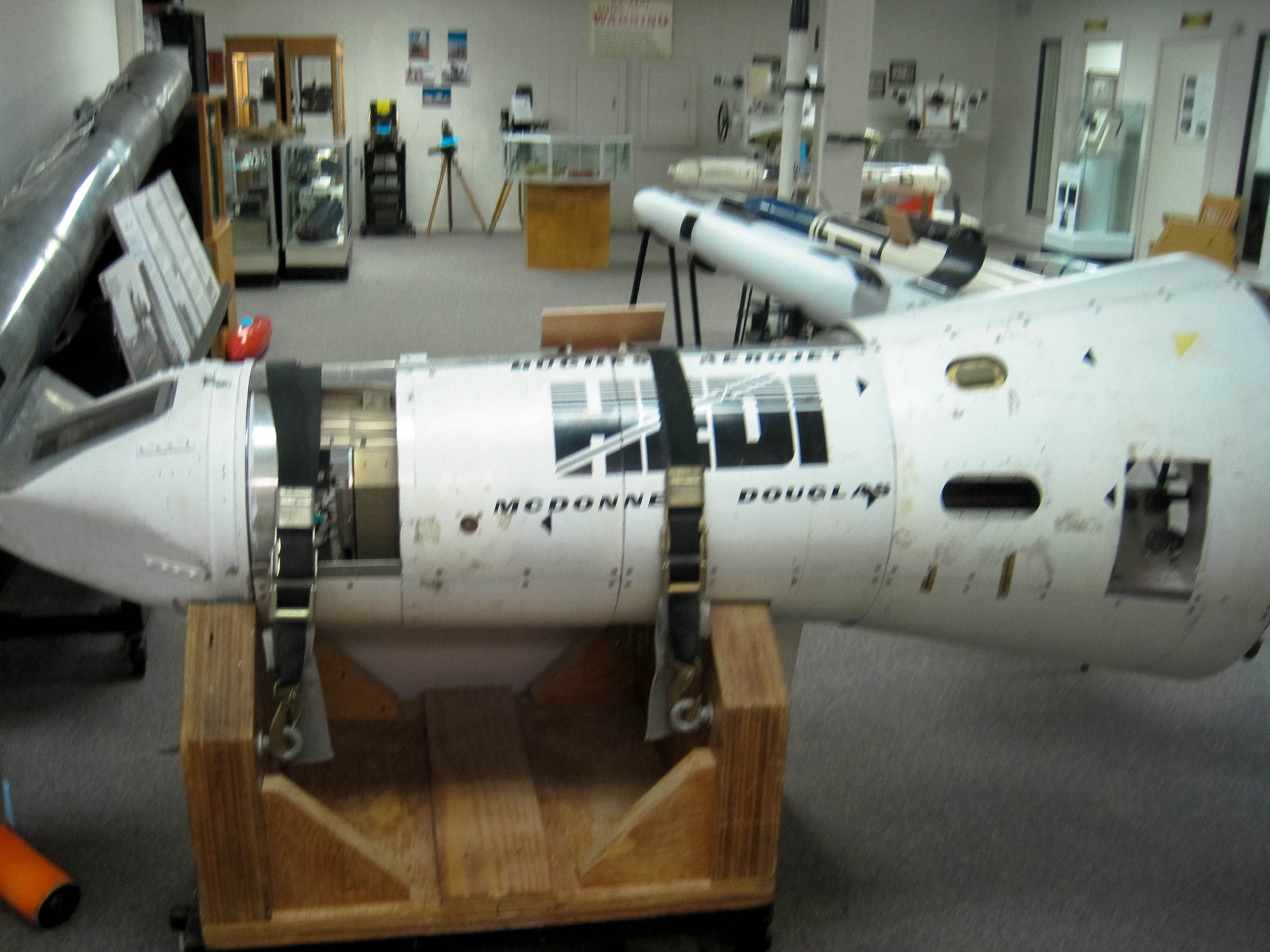
High Endoatmospheric Defense Interceptor

In 1985, Lockheed Corporation was awarded a contract to develop an ABM system - the ERIS - that was compliant with the ABM Treaty. ERIS was to be a high altitude component of SDI that would operate in outer space. It would intercept and destroy an incoming ICBM before the ICBM re-entered the atmosphere. ERIS was to be complemented by another ABM system, High Endoatmospheric Defense Interceptor (HEDI), which destroyed enemy missiles in the atmosphere. The ERIS delivery vehicle was composed of the second and third stages of surplus Minuteman I ICBMs. The guidance system was based on technology developed during the earlier Homing Overlay Experiment. The guidance system used detected the infrared signature of the targeted ICBM. ERIS used a Kinetic Kill Vehicle (KKV), which destroyed its target by force of impact, not by an explosive charge. The KKV on board ERIS inflated into a large, rigid, octagon-shaped structure moments before impact. This increase in KKV diameter increased the chances of impacting and destroying the target ICBM. The ERIS received data on its target's location from satellites and radar until the KKV separated from the delivery vehicle. At this time, the infrared guidance system of the KKV took over, controlling the KKV until impact. It was also believed that ERIS would be a viable weapon in anti-satellite operations.

== Operational history ==
=== Initial test ===
The ERIS system was only ever utilized in tests. The first test of the ERIS system was on January 28, 1991. The ERIS was launched from Meck Island, and targeted a mock ICBM launched from Vandenberg Air Force Base, California. The role of incoming ICBM was played by an Aries rocket. The Aries was used as a mock ICBM in all tests of the ERIS system. The ERIS successfully intercepted and destroyed the mock ICBM in outer space, at an altitude of over 160 miles. The ERIS's guidance system was also able to outwit two decoy targets (both decoys were balloons) released by the mock ICBM, after being programmed to home in on the central target. The Department of Defense called the test "an unqualified success".

=== Subsequent and cancelled tests ===
During the second and final ERIS test on 13 March 1992, the ERIS missed the mock ICBM. In this test, the KKV's guidance system was forced to distinguish between the mock ICBM and a decoy balloon on its own. The miss resulted from the KKV's guidance system taking too long to distinguish between the mock ICBM and the decoy balloon. Despite the miss, the test was declared a success, as the KKV's guidance system was able to correctly identify the mock ICBM, albeit a bit late.

ERIS was originally scheduled to be tested four times. However, the final two tests were scrubbed, as the first two tests had proven the capabilities of the ERIS system.

== Post–Cold War and current application of ERIS ==
The development of ERIS came late in the Cold War. After the collapse of the Soviet Union, and effective end of the Cold War, the Strategic Defense Initiative was reorganized. ERIS was cancelled as part of the reorganization, and the system was never directly implemented. However, technology developed from ERIS is currently used in other U.S. missile defense systems, including Terminal High Altitude Area Defense (THAAD) and Ground-Based Midcourse Defense (GMD).
