= High Endoatmospheric Defense Interceptor =

US missile defense layer during the Cold War

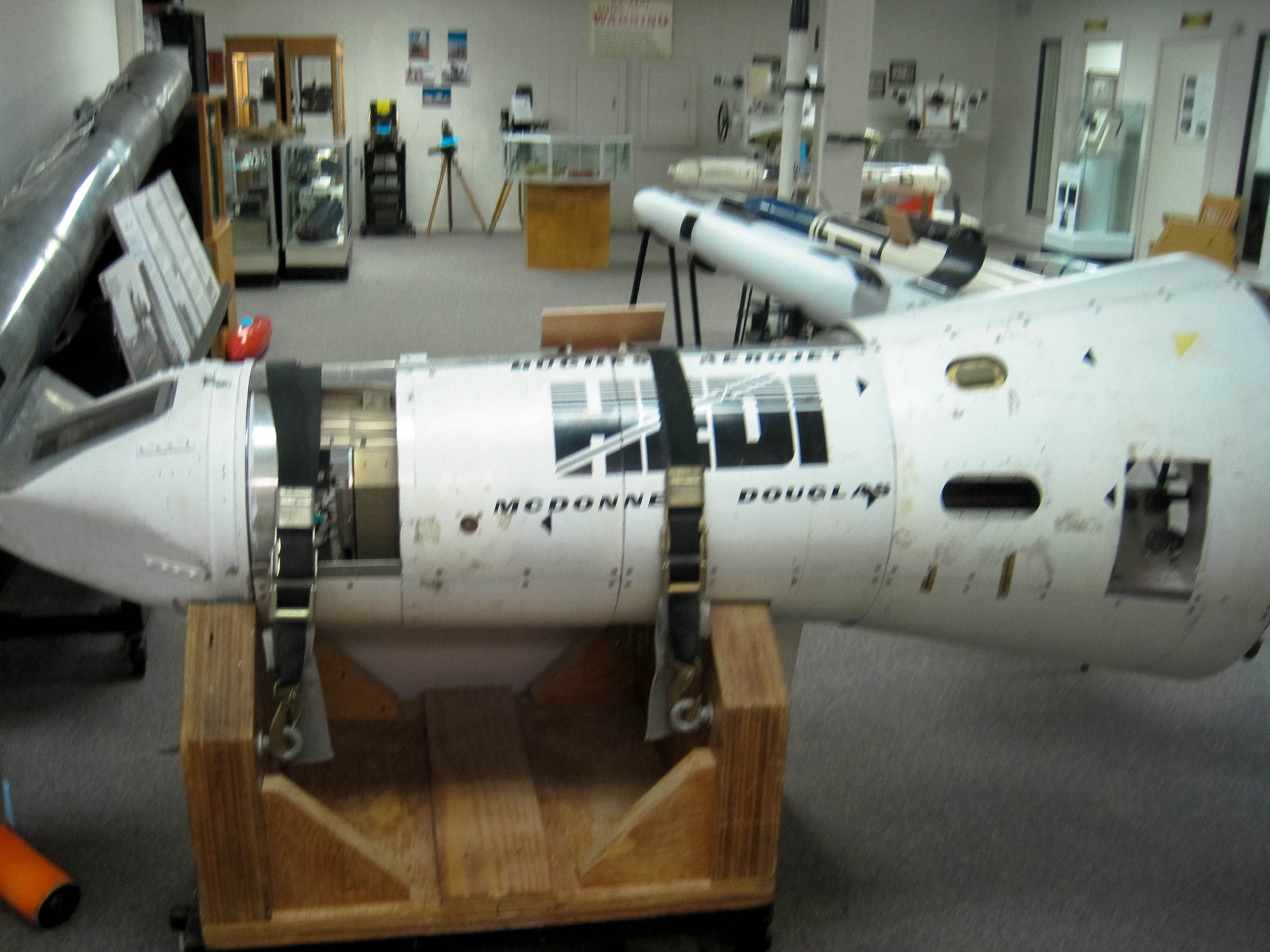
High Endoatmospheric Defense Interceptor kill vehicle

High Endoatmospheric Defense Interceptor (HEDI) was an atmospheric missile defense layer developed for the Strategic Defense Initiative, along with Exoatmospheric Reentry-vehicle Interceptor Subsystem. It consisted of a two-stage launch vehicle (booster) and an infrared homing kill vehicle with a conventional warhead. Hughes Aircraft and Aerojet were contractors, and McDonnell Douglas was the system integrator.

The HEDI aimed to employ ground-based missiles to intercept submarine-launched ballistic missiles and intercontinental ballistic missiles and operate in the high endoatmosphere region in order to destroy them.

== See also ==
- Terminal High Altitude Area Defense
