= SACI-2 =

Failed Brazilian satellite

- Mission type: Earth orbiter
- Operator: INPE
- COSPAR ID: 1999-F05
- Mission duration: Launch failure

Spacecraft properties
- Manufacturer: INPE
- Launch mass: 80 kilograms (180 lb)
- Power: 150 watts

Start of mission
- Launch date: November 11, 1999, 19:40:00 UTC
- Rocket: VLS-1 V2
- Launch site: Alcântara VLS Pad

Orbital parameters
- Reference system: Geocentric
- Regime: Sun-synchronous
- Eccentricity: 0.00084
- Perigee altitude: 733 kilometres (455 mi)
- Apogee altitude: 745 kilometres (463 mi)
- Inclination: 98.6°
- Period: 99.6 minutes
- Epoch: Planned

The SACI-2 was a Brazilian experimental satellite, designed and built by the Brazilian Institute for Space Research (INPE). It was launched on 11 December 1999 from the INPE base in Alcântara, Maranhão, by the Brazilian VLS-1 V02 rocket. Due to failure of its second stage, the rocket veered off course and had to be destroyed 3 minutes and 20 seconds after launch.

The name was officially an acronym of Satélite de Aplicações CIentíficas ("Scientific Applications Satellite"), but was obviously taken from the Saci character of Brazilian folklore.

== Specifications ==
The satellite weighted approximately 80 kg. It was a box approximately 60 cm long and 40 cm square, with a circular base plate and surrounded by a metal ring, both about 80 cm in diameter. Besides being a technology testbed, it carried four scientific payloads (PLASMEX, MAGNEX, OCRAS and PHOTO), with a total weight of 10 kg, to investigate plasma bubbles in the geomagnetic field, air glow, and anomalous cosmic radiation fluxes. It was meant to circle the Earth on a circular orbit at 750 km altitude, inclined 17.5 ° from the Equator.

== Energy supply ==
- Solar cells: Gallium Arsenide (AsGa)
- Dimensions: 3 panels of 57 cm x 44 cm
- Efficiency: 19%
- Power output: 150 W
- Nickel Cadmium (NiCd) Battery Cells
- Voltage: 1.4 V
- Capacity: 4.5 Ah
- Remote control rate: 19.2 kbit/s
- Transmission rate: 500 kbit/s
- Antennas of edge: 2 of transmission and 2 of reception, type Microstrip
- Operating frequency telemetry/remote control: 2,250 GHz / 2,028 GHz
- Receiving antenna in soil: 3.4 m in diameter

The spin-stabilized spacecraft carried two S-band communication links (a 2W, 256 kb/ s downlink and 19.2 kbit/s uplink), and a 48 MB solid state data recorder. It is variously reported to have cost between US$ 800,000 and US$1.7 million.

== See also ==
- 1999 in spaceflight
