= Orion 3 =

American spacecraft

- Mission type: Communication
- Operator: Loral
- COSPAR ID: 1999-024A
- SATCAT no.: 25727
- Mission duration: 15 years (planned); Launch failure

Spacecraft properties
- Bus: HS-601HP
- Manufacturer: Hughes
- Launch mass: 4,300 kilograms (9,500 lb)

Start of mission
- Launch date: 5 May 1999, 01:00:00 UTC
- Rocket: Delta III 8930
- Launch site: Cape Canaveral SLC-17B
- Contractor: Boeing

Orbital parameters
- Reference system: Geocentric
- Regime: Geostationary (planned); Low Earth (achieved)
- Longitude: 139° East (planned)
- Perigee altitude: 421 kilometres (262 mi)
- Apogee altitude: 1,317 kilometres (818 mi)
- Inclination: 29.0 degrees
- Period: 102.3 minutes
- Epoch: 4 March 1999, 21:00:00 UTC

Transponders
- Band: 10 G/H band 33 J band

Orion 3 was an American spacecraft which was intended for use by Orion Network Systems, as a geostationary communications satellite. It was to have been positioned in geostationary orbit at a longitude of 139° East, from where it was to have provided communications services to Asia and Oceania. Due to a malfunction during launch, it was instead delivered to a useless low Earth orbit.

Orion 3 was constructed by Hughes Space and Communications, based on an HS-601HP satellite bus. It was equipped with 10 G/H band (IEEE C band) and 33 J band (IEEE K_{u} band) transponders, and at launch it had a mass of 4,300 kilograms (9,500 lb). The satellite was expected to remain operational for around fifteen years. Orion Network Systems merged with Loral Space & Communications in 1999 after the Orion 3 launch failure.

== Launch ==
The Orion 3 satellite was launched on the second flight of the Delta III rocket, using the standard 8930 configuration. The launch occurred from Space Launch Complex 17B at the Cape Canaveral Air Force Station, at 01:00:00 GMT on 5 May 1999. The first stage and solid rocket motors performed as expected, and the first burn of the second stage was conducted as planned, injecting the spacecraft into low Earth orbit. Following this, the rocket entered a coast phase, before the second stage restarted for what was planned to be a 162-second burn to insert Orion 3 into a geosynchronous transfer orbit. Around 3.4 seconds after igniting, the RL10B-2 engine of the second stage cut off after a malfunction was detected, leaving the spacecraft in an orbit of around 160 by 1,284 kilometres (99 mi × 798 mi), with 29.5° inclination. It was the second failure of an RL10 powered rocket in less than a week, after the Centaur upper stage of a Titan IV rocket failed during the launch of USA-143 on 30 April, although this incident was later attributed to a programming error.

An investigation later determined that the failure of Orion 3's launch was due to the wall of the RL10 combustion chamber being breached. The investigation found that it was likely that the breach in the chamber was along one of the seams where the chamber had been soldered. On this engine, one of those seams had failed during a static firing, and despite subsequent repair, it was suspected that the same seam had failed again.

The orbit of the Orion 3 satellite was raised slightly, and its inclination reduced, using onboard propulsion. It was left in an orbit with a perigee of 421 kilometres (262 mi), an apogee of 1,317 kilometres (818 mi), and 29° inclination. Its operators received US$247 million in insurance for the loss of the satellite, which was turned over to its insurers. The insurers considered asking NASA to fly a Space Shuttle mission to attach a solid rocket motor to the satellite, which would have been used to correct its orbit. The Shuttle mission would have been similar to STS-49, which reboosted Intelsat 603 following the failure of its launch on a Commercial Titan III. Unlike with Intelsat 603, however, Orion 3 would have needed to perform a Lunar flyby to reduce inclination. NASA considered attaching cameras and a scientific payload to the satellite for the flyby, however reboosting the satellite was subsequently deemed to not be sufficiently cost-effective, and Orion 3 was abandoned.

== See also ==
- 1999 in spaceflight
