= Hera (rocket) =

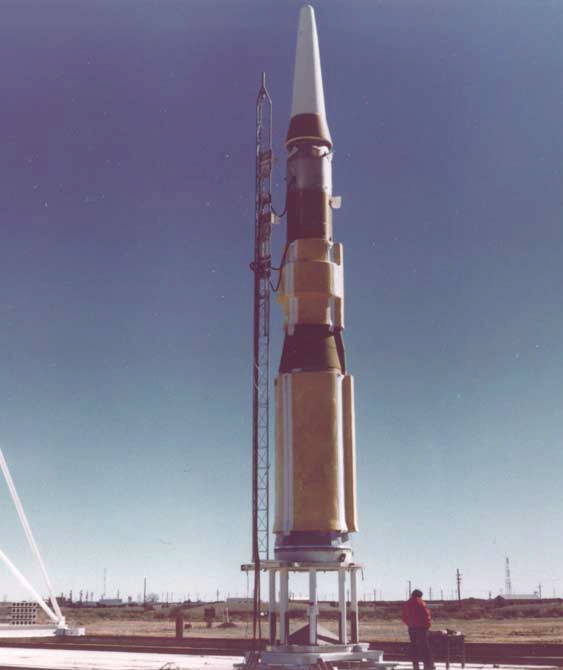
- Hera rocket on launch pad
- Type: Surface-to-surface guided missile
- Place of origin: United States

Service history
- Used by: United States

Production history
- Designer: Coleman Aerospace

Specifications
- Mass: 11,300 kilograms (24,912 lb)
- Length: 11.9 metres (39.0 ft)
- Diameter: 1.32 metres (4.3 ft) (first stage)
- Engine: First stage: Aerojet General SR19-AJ-1 solid-fuel rocket; 268 kN (60,300 lbf); 2nd stage: Hercules M57A1 solid-fuel rocket; 156 kN (35,000 lbf)
- Operational range: 1,100 kilometres (684 mi)

Hera is a target missile for development testing of missile defense systems such as Terminal High Altitude Area Defense and Patriot PAC-3.

== History ==
In 1992, the United States Army Space and Missile Defense Command awarded the Theater Missile Defense (TMD) Targets contract to Coleman Aerospace with Space Vector Corporation and Aerotherm as sub-contractors. Coleman developed Hera using the second and third stages of the Minuteman II ("MMII") and the guidance section of the Pershing II. The Rocket Systems Launch Program at Detachment 12, USAF Space and Missile Systems Center, provided technical program management services involved with removing the liquid injection thrust vector control system from the retired MMII second stages in favor of a flex-seal system enabling robust flight control from launch to burn out. First launch was on April 24, 1995, at White Sands Missile Range.

Because of its range, Russia claims Hera qualifies as an IRBM and hence violates Item 1, Article 6 of the INF Treaty.

Hera is also used in the USAF Sounding Rocket Program.

There were twelve tests using the Hera missile system launched from Fort Wingate over the Datil Mountains to White Sands Missile Range between 1997 and 2004. In March 2009, the tests were resumed with a thirteenth flight over the Datil Mountains. Other tests using the HERA were conducted entirely within the missile range, such as the aborted 13 September 2006 test of the Terminal High Altitude Area Defense (THAAD) system.

During THAAD flight test FTT-11 on December 11, 2009, the Hera target missile failed to ignite following its airborne deployment, subsequently crashing into the ocean. In the wake of this incident, Missile Defense Agency Director LTG Patrick O'Reilly sharply criticized L-3 Coleman Aerospace quality control practices, and in March 2010 suspended further Hera purchases. The suspension was lifted on May 9, 2011 when the Air Force Space and Missile Systems Center and the Missile Defense Agency were satisfied that Coleman had completed the necessary corrective actions.

On October 30, 2013, the Pentagon announced that L3-Coleman had won a $74 million contract to continue to develop and supply medium-range ballistic missile targets to the Missile Defense Agency, beating out three competing bidders including Orbital Sciences Corporation and Lockheed Martin Space Systems.
