= VLS-1 V02 =

VLS-1 launch
- Launch: 11 December 1999, 18:40 p.m UTC
- Operator: Ministry of Aeronautics; AEB; INPE
- Pad: Alcântara Launch Center VLS-Pad
- Payload: (Brazil) SACI-2
- Outcome: Failure
- Launch duration: 3m15s

VLS-1 flights

VLS-1 V02 was the second flight of the VLS-1 rocket on December 11, 1999, from the Alcântara Launch Center, with the objective of placing the SACI-2 microsatellite in LEO. The rocket was remotely destroyed 3 minutes after launch.

== Origins ==
Satellite SACI-2

The mission's goal was to place the SACI-2 satellite in into a circular orbit 750 km high. This followed after SACI-1, launched by China, was lost due to a transmitter failure. It was the second launch of the VLS-1 rocket, with the first being lost shortly after launch. The launch campaign was called "Operation Almenara", (Note: Translation: "Sliver of light".) and occurred after the necessary modifications had been made.

The total cost of the operation was US$7.4 million, with the satellite being valued at R$2.04 million (U$ 1124628.18). The budget constraints prevented a test launch before the official launch. SACI-2's mission was to collect hydro-meteorological and environmental data as part of a study of space geophysics.

In March 1999 the preparations at the Alcântara Launch Center were underway. On June 18, 1999, Defense Minister Élcio Álvares observed the rocket's assembly and integration activities at the Aeronautics Institute of Technology.

SACI-2 began to be assembled in July underwent control and attitude tests in August, the same month that the Minister of Science Ronaldo Sardenberg confirmed the allocation of R$ 2.8 million (U$ 1543607.31) to finalize preparations for the launch of the VLS-1, (Note: Announcement published in the Official Gazette of the Union on 17 September, 1999.) and arrived in Maranhão on November 28, 1999, with integration with the rocket taking place immediately after arrival, four days later than planned.

The launch was planned for November 20, 1999, but tests of SACI-2 in the thermo-vacuum chamber indicated a failure in one of the electronic components. The rocket was ready by the same month. The satellite problem was solved by replacing the memory in the internal computer. If the satellite had not been repaired before launch, they considered dismantling the VLS or launching it empty.

By December 7, the launch was scheduled for December 7, but was postponed due to problems with the rocket. On the same day, December 7, the launch center teams wrapped up the simulated countdown. The next day, the Brazilian Space Agency announced that the launch window was between December 7 and 20, with the tests on the 7th making a launch on December 11 likely.

Around 600 people were involved in the launch, and the airspace in the region was closed for approximately three hours, with the launch itself expected to take twelve minutes.

== Launch ==
VLS-1 V02 was launched on December 11, 1999, at 18:40 (UTC), after a ten-minute delay. The four strap-on boosters worked correctly, however, it was remotely destroyed after 3 minutes and 15 seconds into the flight. The debris fell within the interdicted area.

The report from the DEPED states that the first 55.8 seconds of flight proceeded as planned, resulting in the ignition of the second stage. At 55.9 seconds, an explosion occurred in this stage due to increased internal pressure in the engine, causing the unintended release of the first-stage engines and a premature separation between stages 2 and 3. Stages 3 and 4, with the payload fairing containing the satellite, continued on a ballistic, uncontrolled trajectory. At 119 seconds, the onboard computer initiated ignition of the third stage, which functioned correctly for the expected duration despite the anomalous conditions. At 189 seconds, upon realizing that the assembly was leaving the safety zone, the ground crew ordered its remote destruction.

The announcement of the failure only came one hour and 20 minutes after the accident. According to the official version, Brigadier Tiago Ribeiro, responsible for the announcement, would have been ill due to emotion after the accident.

== Aftermath ==
The announcement came from the INPE directorate in São José dos Campos, about an hour before an official military announcement. The Brazilian Air Force relied on help from fishing communities to locate the wreckage. Its four boosters fell 60 kilometers off the coast of the Parnaíba region; the second stage and the rest of the rocket fell off the coast of Fortaleza. Among military circles there were rumors that the VLS had been the victim of sabotage. Márcio Barbosa, INPE's director, stated to the Associated Press that "This was better than the last time. We've advanced a little."

The Brazilian and international media had difficulty communicating with their newspapers due to overloaded Internet. The failure led INPE to cancel the microsatellite program, although this was initially denied by the Ministry of Science. On December 13, 1999, President Fernando Henrique Cardoso announced that the project would be reviewed by the MCT, the Aeronautics and INPE.

The investigation, with the report concluded by March 2000, which drew on telemetry data, the VLS wreckage, and video recordings, revealed that the accident was due to a flame penetration of the second stage block and the front flexible heat shield flap. The investigation’s findings recommended studies to prevent flame penetration; an assessment of the feasibility of keeping the engine pressurized until takeoff; studies on the structural integrity of the propellant block; and a reassessment of inspection procedures. It was determined that the rocket had a normal launch and flew as expected; the upper stage remained intact; the onboard computer functioned as expected; and there were no structural failures or fuel-related problems.

The next launch, VLS-1 V03, after plans to launch it in 2001, was finally scheduled for 2003. However, on August 22, 2003, three days before the launch, the rocket was destroyed at its base due to an accidental ignition, leading to 21 deaths. Following the 2003 accident, "Tribuna da Imprensa" revealed that electrical cables had been found to have been cut "intentionally" on the 1999 flight. VLS-1 V04 had 70% of its structure built, but the program was terminated in 2016.

== Flight profile ==
Mission timeline
Time	Event	Result
00:00	Liftoff	Success
00:55,8	2nd stage ignition	Success
00:55,9	Explosion of the second stage, and separation of stages 3 and 4 on a ballistic trajectory	
01:09	3rd stage ignition	Success
02:11	Payload fairing separation	—N/a
03:00	3rd stage shutdown	Success
03:08	3rd stage separation	—N/a
03:15	Remote destruction of the upper stage	
~07:00	4th stage ignition	—N/a
09:00	Satellite orbit injection	—N/a

== Bibliography ==
DEPED report

- "Introdução". Relatório de Falha - VLS-1 V02 (in Brazilian Portuguese). Archived from the original on 2004-08-12.
- "Metodologia de Análise". Relatório de Falha - VLS-1 V02 (in Brazilian Portuguese). Archived from the original on 2004-08-19.
- "Análise da Falha". Relatório de Falha - VLS-1 V02 (in Brazilian Portuguese). Archived from the original on 2004-08-19.
- "Gráficos". Relatório de Falha - VLS-1 V02 (in Brazilian Portuguese). Archived from the original on 2004-08-19.
- "Figuras da Sub-Câmara". Relatório de Falha - VLS-1 V02 (in Brazilian Portuguese). Archived from the original on 2004-08-19.
- "Conclusão". Relatório de Falha - VLS-1 V02 (in Brazilian Portuguese). Archived from the original on 2004-08-19.

(Chronological order)

- "Alcântara retoma lançamento de satélites". Jornal do Commercio (in Brazilian Portuguese). Vol. 95, no. 37774. 1999-03-10. p. 4.
- "CTA produzirá tecnologia de uso militar". Jornal do Brasil (in Brazilian Portuguese). Vol. 109, no. 72. 1999-06-19. p. 4.
- Regina Célia, França (1999-08-06). "Satélite SACI-2 é Testado em Laboratório do CTA". AEB Informa (in Brazilian Portuguese). Archived from the original on 2001-04-23.
- Regina Célia, França (1999-08-19). "Lançamento do segundo protótipo do VLS-1". AEB Informa (in Brazilian Portuguese). Archived from the original on 2001-04-23.
- Regina Célia, França (1999-09-20). "Recurso para lançamento do VLS-1 já está disponível". AEB Informa (in Brazilian Portuguese). Archived from the original on 2001-04-23.
- Pacelli, Márcio (1999-11-11). "Lançamento do Saci-2 é adiado". Jornal do Brasil (in Brazilian Portuguese). Vol. 109, no. 217. p. 14.
- Falcão, Daniela (1999-11-11). "Saci-2 altera missão de foguete brasileiro". Folha de S. Paulo (in Brazilian Portuguese).
- "Saci-2 embarca para o Maranhao para ser lançado". Jornal Diário do Grande ABC (in Brazilian Portuguese). 1999-11-28.
- Regina Célia, França (1999-12-01). "VLS-1 – Definida a data de Lançamento". AEB Informa (in Brazilian Portuguese). Archived from the original on 2001-07-06.
- "Saci2 em órbita dia 7". Ministério da Ciência (in Brazilian Portuguese). Archived from the original on 2003-02-25.
- "Foguete". A Tribuna (in Brazilian Portuguese). Vol. 106, no. 236. 1999-12-06. p. 5.
- "Data de lançamento do VLS-1 é adiada". Folha de S. Paulo (in Brazilian Portuguese). 1999-12-06.
- "Saci-2 foi para a base com atraso". Folha de S. Paulo (in Brazilian Portuguese). 1999-12-06.
- "VLS-1 será lançado dia 11". Ministério da Ciência (in Brazilian Portuguese). 1999-12-06. Archived from the original on 2003-02-25.
- Regina Célia, França (1999-12-08). "Lançamento do VLS-1 e do SACI-2". AEB Informa (in Brazilian Portuguese). Archived from the original on 2000-06-06.
- "Foguete brasileiro será lançado sábado". Jornal do Commercio (in Brazilian Portuguese). Vol. 173, no. 57. 1999-12-09. p. 13.
- "Brasil poe em órbita satélite de coleta de dados". Jornal Diário do Grande ABC (in Brazilian Portuguese). 1999-12-10.
- "Saci-2 deve ser lançado hoje, em Alcântara". A Tribuna (in Brazilian Portuguese). Vol. 106, no. 261. 1999-12-11. p. 6.
- "Foguete brasileiro lança hoje o Saci-2". Jornal do Commercio (in Brazilian Portuguese). Vol. 173, no. 59. 1999-12-11. p. 14.
- "Foguete brasileiro explode 70 segundos após lançamento". Jornal Diário do Grande ABC (in Brazilian Portuguese). 1999-12-11.
- "Brasil põe novo satélite em órbita". Pioneiro (in Brazilian Portuguese). Vol. 52, no. 7489. December 1999. p. 37.
- Neto, Ricardo Bonalume (1999-12-12). "Foguete brasileiro sobe, mas é explodido após 200 segundos". Folha de S. Paulo (in Brazilian Portuguese).
- "Brazilian rocket misfires, destroys national satellite". Spaceflight Now. 1999-12-12.
- Ottoboni, Júlio (1999-12-12). "Inpe cancela programa de microssatélites, após fracasso com Saci-2". Folha de Londrina (in Brazilian Portuguese).
- "Inpe cancela programa com fracasso do Saci-2". Pioneiro (in Brazilian Portuguese). Vol. 52, no. 7490. 1999-12-13. p. 18.
- "INPE mantém programação de satélites". Ministério da Ciência (in Brazilian Portuguese). 1999-12-13. Archived from the original on 2002-12-26.
- França, William; Martins, Cristina Lima (1999-12-14). "Programa espacial brasileiro será revisado". Folha de S. Paulo (in Brazilian Portuguese).
- Lino, Geraldo Luís (1999-12-27). "O VLS e as pesquisas espaciais". Tribuna da Imprensa (in Brazilian Portuguese). Vol. 50, no. 15246. p. 4.
- "Almoço de desagravo a Bräuer terá tom de indignação militar". Tribuna da Imprensa (in Brazilian Portuguese). Vol. 51, no. 15247. 1999-12-28. p. 2.
- Célia França, Regina (2000-03-16). "Concluído o relatório de falha do segundo protótipo do VLS-1". AEB Informa (in Brazilian Portuguese). Archived from the original on 2001-04-10.
- Martins, Cristina Lima (2000-03-17). "Relatório indica falha de VLS-1". Folha de S. Paulo (in Brazilian Portuguese).
- "Sobrevivente diz que projeto tinha falhas". Tribuna da Imprensa (in Brazilian Portuguese). Vol. LIV, no. 16.373. 2003-08-26. p. 3.
- Berquó, Jolan Eduardo; Coelho, Elizabeth Cabral; Martinolli, João Bosco; Corrêa, Cleber Souza (February 2004). Relatório da Investigação do Acidente ocorrido com o VLS-1 VO3, em 22 de agosto de 2003, em Alcântara, Maranhão (PDF). São José dos Campos: Ministerio de Defesa Comando da Aeronautica. p. 118. Archived (PDF) from the original on 2013-11-08.
- Palmerio, Ariovaldo Feliz (2017). Introdução à Tecnologia de Foguetes (PDF) (in Brazilian Portuguese) (2 ed.). São José dos Campos: SindCT. p. 304. ISBN 978-85-62042-05-8.
- Froehlich; Alonso; Soria; Marchi (2020). Latin America's Emerging Space Middle Powers. Springer International Publishing. p. 446. ISBN 9783030385200.
- Bôas, Danton José Fortes Villas. O Veículo Lançador de Satélites - VLS-1 (PDF) (Thesis) (in Brazilian Portuguese). IAE. p. 24.
- Silva, Bernardino Coelho da (2021). Desafios de Ícaro (in Brazilian Portuguese). Clube de Autores. p. 690. ISBN 978-65-00-24466-3.
- Zurita, Marcelo (2021-08-30). "18 anos do acidente de Alcântara, a tragédia que marcou a história do Programa Espacial Brasileiro". Olhar Digital (in Brazilian Portuguese).
- Duarte, Marcella (2022-08-26). "19 anos da tragédia em Alcântara: foguete brasileiro explodiu e matou 21". Uol (in Brazilian Portuguese).
