= Sputnik 99 =

Nano-satellite launched April 2, 1999

- Mission type: radio communication
- Operator: Aéro-Club de France; AMSAT; Roscosmos
- COSPAR ID: 1999-015C
- SATCAT no.: NK9905-01

Spacecraft properties
- Spacecraft type: AR broadcast
- Payload mass: 3kg (6.6 lbs.)
- Dimensions: 23 cm sphere
- Power: batteries

Start of mission
- Launch date: April 2, 1999
- Rocket: Soyuz-U-PVB
- Launch site: Baikonur Cosmodrome
- Deployed from: Mir space station
- Deployment date: April 16, 1999 04:37 GMT
- Entered service: denied

End of mission
- Decay date: July 29, 1999

Orbital parameters
- Period: 91.51 min

Orbiter

Orbital parameters
- Peri altitude: 336 km (208 mi)
- Apo altitude: 361 km (224 mi)
- Inclination: 51.60 deg.

Sputnik 99 (Russian: Спутник 99, also Radio Sputnik 19 or RS-19) launched on April 2, 1999 from the Baikonur Cosmodrome on board a Soyuz-U-PVB launch vehicle. The nano-satellite was created in a joint-venture by Rosaviakosmos, Aéro-Club de France, and the Radio Amateur Satellite Corporation (AMSAT) as a marketing effort financially backed by The Swatch Group. Sputnik 99 was deployed from the Mir space station on April 16, 1999, even though its primary mission package, an amateur radio broadcast system (AR), had been purposely disabled, immediately rendering the satellite a piece of space debris.

== Program details ==
=== Development and delivery ===
The Sputnik 99 payload exclusively comprised a radio transmitter designed for commercial use in space. Rosaviakosmos partnered with the Aéro-Club de France and AMSAT-R and AMSAT-F in the development of the Sputnik 99 mission. As part of efforts to develop income streams to continue the Mir space station program, the Russian Space Agency's flight control center, TsUP, made arrangements with a Swiss watch manufacturer to broadcast a branded advertisement from the satellite, disregarding international convention.

The nano-satellite (it was 1/3 the size of the original Sputnik 1 satellite) was launched on April 2, 1999, aboard Progress-M 41 atop a Soyuz-U-PVB launch vehicle. The launch took place from Baikonur launch complex LC1, and coincided with Mir flight programs designated Mir EO-27 and Mir EO-26/-27. Classified as a re-supply mission, Progress-41 docked with Mir and transferred the Sputnik 99 satellite to the station on April 4.

=== Commercial mission ===
The Sputnik 99 AR package, although with its advertisement delivery system deliberately disabled, was deployed (by hand) on its own orbit by French spationaut Jean-Pierre Haigneré during an April 16 EVA with cosmonaut Viktor Afanasev.

The satellite mission was for essentially a way to secure funds for the Russian space program, the "Mir" project specifically, by commercializing space. Sputnik 99 was designed to periodically broadcast technical time-synchronization information and trademarked advertising content over amateur radio bands promoting the Swatch Group, the parent company to the popular Swiss watch retailer. Worldwide, this was considered as a flagrant misuse of amateur radio frequencies. Due to a huge backlash by amateur radio enthusiasts and amateur radio organizations over the proposed use of the AR frequencies for advertising purposes, the decision was made to disable the broadcast transmitter prior to its deployment from Mir. This was accomplished by removing the batteries of the broadcast unit from the satellite prior to its release, thus Sputnik 99 immediately upon deployment became just another piece of orbiting space junk.

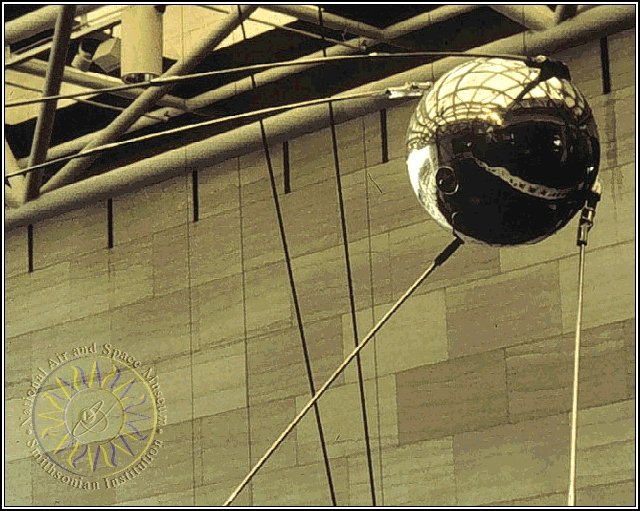
Mock-up: Sputnik 99, a "nano-satellite," was just 1/3 the size of the original sputnik satellite depicted here

== Aftermath ==
Decommissioned even before its deployment, Sputnik 99 was nevertheless placed on orbit, only to become a piece of orbital debris. Progress-41 undertook several engine burns beginning in late April to boost Mir's orbit, as Russia still worked at securing commercially backed funding to support the space station's continuance. While initially designated for a mission duration of 105.99 days, the Progress capsule was undocked and de-orbited on July 17, 1999. The Sputnik 99 satellite itself re-entered Earth's atmosphere on or about July 29, 1999 and was destroyed.

== See also ==
- Sputnik 41 – prior, similar AR package delivery
- List of spacecraft called Sputnik
