= Terminal High Altitude Area Defense =

US ballistic missile defense system

Terminal High Altitude Area Defense (THAAD)
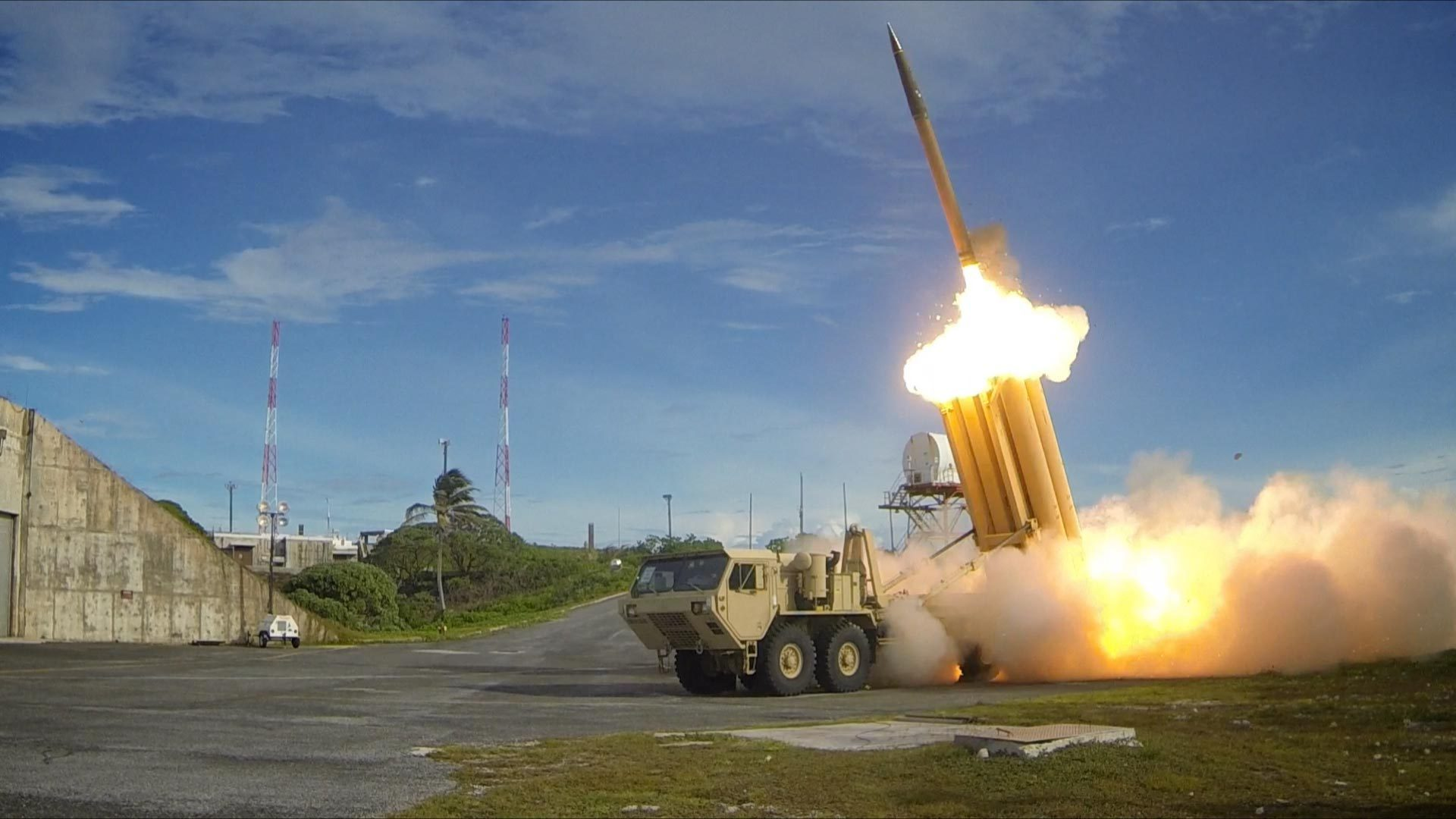
- A Terminal High Altitude Area Defense interceptor being fired during an exercise in 2013
- Type: Mobile anti-ballistic missile system
- Place of origin: United States

Service history
- In service: 2008–present
- Used by: United States Army
- Wars: 2022 Abu Dhabi attack; Twelve-Day War; 2026 Iran war

Production history
- Designer: Lockheed
- Designed: 1992–1999
- Manufacturer: Lockheed Martin Missiles and Fire Control
- Unit cost: US$1.00 billion per battery; US$12.6 million per missile (FY2017)
- Produced: 2008–present
- No. built: At least 12 batteries (8 U.S. Army, 4 foreign operated); at least 632 interceptors as of June 2025

Specifications
- Mass: 2,000 lb (900 kg)
- Length: 20 ft 3 in (6.17 m)
- Diameter: 13 in (340 mm) (booster); 15 in (370 mm) (kill vehicle)
- Engine: Single-stage rocket by Aerojet Rocketdyne
- Propellant: Pratt & Whitney solid-fueled rocket
- Operational range: 120 mi (200 km)
- Flight ceiling: 93 mi (150 km)
- Maximum speed: 6,300 mph (2,800 m/s; 10,000 km/h; Mach 8.2)
- Guidance system: Indium-antimonide imaging infra-red seeker head
- Accuracy: Hit-to-kill
- Transport: Transporter erector launcher

Terminal High Altitude Area Defense (THAAD), formerly Theater High Altitude Area Defense, is an American anti-ballistic missile defense system, deployed since 2008, designed to intercept and destroy short-, medium-, and intermediate-range ballistic missiles in their terminal phase (descent or reentry). The THAAD interceptor carries no warhead, instead relying on its kinetic energy of impact to destroy the incoming missile. THAAD was developed after the experience of Iraq's Scud missile attacks during the Gulf War in 1991.

THAAD has an operational range of 200 km. Each battery consists of six transporter erector launcher trucks with eight launch tubes each, 48 interceptors, one AN/TPY-2 transportable radar, three control stations, and a crew of 90 soldiers. The control stations connect to the US C2BMC communications system, integrating THAAD into a layered air defense architecture alongside the longer-range Ground-Based Interceptor, the similar-range Aegis Ballistic Missile Defense System, and shorter-range MIM-104 Patriot.

A United States Army program, THAAD is also under the umbrella of the Missile Defense Agency. THAAD was originally scheduled for deployment in 2012, but initial deployment took place in May 2008.

As of 2025, the US Army's Air Defense Artillery Branch operated eight THAAD batteries. Until 2026, five batteries were based in the US, one in Guam, one in South Korea, while the destination of the eighth battery was unclear. The US Army has deployed THAAD to Israel, Jordan, Romania, and South Korea. Additionally, the United Arab Emirates Air Force operates two batteries and the Royal Saudi Air Force operates one battery with plans to procure a further six. The deployment of a US THAAD in South Korea, announced in 2016 and begun in 2017, allegedly in response to North Korean nuclear and missile capabilities, played a major role in South Korean politics and heightened tensions with China and North Korea, who each feared it would erode their nuclear deterrence.

THAAD made its first operational interception during the Abu Dhabi attack in January 2022, with an Emirati battery intercepting a ballistic missile fired by the Houthis in Yemen. The U.S. Army deployed a THAAD battery to Israel in October 2024, in the aftermath of the 2024 Iran–Israel conflict. Interceptors were intermittently fired against Houthi missile attacks. In the June 2025 Twelve-Day War, reportedly over 150 interceptors were fired, comprising 25% of total number of missiles funded by all prior US military budgets.

The Center for Strategic and International Studies estimated that U.S. forces expended around half of pre-war THAAD inventories during Operation Epic Fury. Iranian strikes reportedly damaged or destroyed a THAAD installation in Jordan and potentially two in the UAE.

== Development ==
A diagram of a THAAD missile

The THAAD missile defense concept was proposed in 1987, with a formal request for proposals submitted to industry in 1991. The THAAD program benefited from results of previous missile defense efforts including High Endoatmospheric Defense Interceptor (HEDI) and the Kinetic Kill Vehicle Integrated Technology Experiment (KITE). In September 1992, the US Army selected Lockheed, now Lockheed Martin, as the prime contractor for THAAD development.

Prior to the development of a physical prototype, the Aero-Optical Effect (AOE) software code was developed to validate the intended operational profile of Lockheed's proposed design. In April 1995, the first THAAD flight test occurred, with all flight tests in the demonstration-validation (DEM-VAL) program phase occurring at White Sands Missile Range. The first six intercept attempts missed the target (Flights 4–9). The first successful intercepts were conducted in June and August 1999, against Hera missiles.

The US Army Research Laboratory (ARL) assessed the vulnerability of THAAD, which featured an evaluation of the effects of major electromagnetic elements, including EM interference, EM radiation operations, EM radiation hazards, EM pulse, electrostatic discharge, and lightning, on components of the system. The assessment was also designed to determine the system's growth potential given its tactical design and provide survivability analysis against threats such as conventional weapons, chemical weapons, and electronic warfare countermeasures. The data collected from the analyses were used to develop trajectory models for targets and missile as well as target trajectories using infrared scene generation of infrared countermeasures (IRCMs).

The THAAD system is designed, built, and integrated by prime contractor Lockheed Martin Missiles and Fire Control, with key subcontractors including Raytheon, Boeing, Aerojet Rocketdyne, Honeywell, BAE Systems, Oshkosh Defense, and MiltonCAT.

A Terminal High Altitude Area Defense System Test, FTT-09 Pacific Missile Range Facility, 25 June 2008

Demonstration and validation
Date	Result	Notes
1995-04-21	Success	First test flight to prove the propulsion system. There was no target in the test.
1995-07-31	Aborted	Kill vehicle control test. The test flight was aborted. There was no target in the test.
1995-10-13	Success	Launched to test its target-seeking system. There was no attempt to hit the target in the test.
1995-12-13	Failure	Failed to hit a test target due to software errors in the missile's fuel system.
1996-03-22	Failure	Failed to hit a test target due to mechanical problems with the kill vehicle's booster separation.
1996-07-15	Failure	Failed to hit a test target due to a malfunction in the targeting system.
1997-03-06	Failure	Failed to hit a test target due to a contamination in the electrical system.
1998-05-12	Failure	Failed to hit a test target due to an electrical short circuit in the booster system. At this point, the US Congress reduced funding for the project due to repeated failures.
1999-03-29	Failure	Failed to hit a test target due to multiple failures, including guidance system.
1999-06-10	Success	Hit a test target in a simplified test scenario.
1999-08-02	Success	Hit a test target in the thermosphere at an altitude of 91 mi (147 km)

=== Engineering and manufacturing ===
In June 2000, Lockheed won the Engineering and Manufacturing Development (EMD) contract to turn the design into a mobile tactical army fire unit. In 2006, flight tests of this system resumed with missile characterization and full system tests at White Sands Missile Range, then moved to the Pacific Missile Range Facility. The Interceptor was led through development and initial production by Tory Bruno, who later became the CEO of United Launch Alliance.

Date	Result	Notes
2005-11-22	Success	Launched a missile in its first Flight EMD Test, known as FLT-01. The test was deemed a success by Lockheed and the Pentagon.
2006-05-11	Success	FLT-02, the first developmental flight test to test the entire system, including interceptor, launcher, radar, and fire control system.
2006-07-12	Success	FLT-03. Intercepted a live target missile.
2006-09-13	Aborted	Hera target missile launched, but had to be terminated in mid-flight before the launch of the FLT-04 missile. This has officially been characterized as a "no test".
2006 Fall	Cancelled	FLT-05, a missile-only test, was postponed until mid-spring 2007.
2007-01-27	Success	FLT-06. Intercepted a "high endo-atmospheric" (just inside Earth's atmosphere) unitary (non-separating) target representing a "SCUD"-type ballistic missile launched from a mobile platform off Kauai in the Pacific Ocean.
2007-04-06	Success	FLT-07 test. Intercepted a "mid endo-atmospheric" unitary target missile off Kauai in the Pacific Ocean. It successfully tested THAAD's interoperability with other elements of the MDS system.
2007-10-27	Success	Conducted a successful exo-atmospheric test at the Pacific Missile Range Facility (PMRF) off Kauai, Hawaii. The flight test demonstrated the system's ability to detect, track and intercept an incoming unitary target above the Earth's atmosphere. The missile was hot-condition tested to prove its ability to operate in extreme environments.
2008-06-27	Success	Downed a missile launched from a C-17 Globemaster III.
2008-09-17	Aborted	Target missile failed shortly after launch, so neither interceptor was launched. Officially a "no test".
2009-03-17	Success	A repeat of the September flight test. This time it was a success.
2009-12-11	Aborted	FLT-11: The Hera target missile failed to ignite after air deployment, and the interceptor was not launched. Officially a "no test".
2010-06-29	Success	FLT-14: Conducted a successful endo-atmospheric intercept of unitary target at lowest altitude to date. Afterward, exercised Simulation-Over-Live-Driver (SOLD) system to inject multiple simulated targets into the THAAD radar to test system's ability to engage a mass raid of enemy ballistic missiles.
2011-10-05	Success	FLT-12: Conducted a successful endo-atmospheric intercept of two targets with two interceptors.
2012-10-24	Success	FTI-01 (Flight Test Integrated 01): test of the integration of THAAD with PAC-3 and Aegis against a raid of 5 missiles of different types. During this engagement THAAD successfully intercepted an Extended Long Range Air Launch Target (E-LRALT) missile dropped from a C-17 north of Wake Island. This marked the first time THAAD had intercepted a Medium Range Ballistic Missile (MRBM). Two AN/TPY-2 were used in the $180M test, with the forward-based radar feeding data into Aegis and Patriot systems as well as THAAD.
2017-07-11	Success	FTT-18 (Flight Test THAAD 18): The FTT-18 test plan was announced to the public on 8 July 2017. The first test of THAAD against an IRBM, FTT-18 successfully occurred on 11 July 2017; an Alaska-based THAAD interceptor, launched from the Pacific Spaceport Complex – Alaska on Kodiak island, intercepted its target over Alaska airspace. The FTT-18 target simulated an intermediate-range ballistic missile. It was "launched" near Hawaii from the cargo hold of a C-17, being initially dropped by parachute. From there the mock IRBM proceeded in a north-easterly direction until reaching Alaskan airspace, where it was intercepted.
2017-07-30	Success	FET-01 (Flight Experiment THAAD 01): In FET-01, the Missile Defense Agency (MDA) gathered threat data from a THAAD interceptor in flight. THAAD detected, tracked, and intercepted a medium-range ballistic missile (MRBM), which was launched from a C-17 by parachute. Soldiers from the 11th ADA Brigade conducted launcher, fire control, and radar operations without foreknowledge of the launch time. The MDA director, Lieutenant General Sam Greaves stated: "In addition to successfully intercepting the target, the data collected will allow MDA to enhance the THAAD weapon system, our modeling and simulation capabilities, and our ability to stay ahead of the evolving threat."

=== THAAD-ER ===
Lockheed is pushing for funding for the development of an extended-range (ER) version of the THAAD, to counter maturing threats posed by hypersonic glide vehicles that adversaries may deploy, namely the Chinese WU-14, to penetrate the gap between low- and high-altitude missile defenses. In 2006, Lockheed performed static fire trials of a modified THAAD booster and continued to fund the project until 2008. The current 14.5 in (37 cm)-diameter single-stage booster design would be expanded to a 21 in (53 cm) first stage for greater range with a second "kick stage", to close the distance to the target and provide improved velocity at burnout and more lateral movement during an engagement.

Although the kill vehicle would not need redesign, the ground-based launcher would have only five missiles instead of eight. As of 2020, THAAD-ER is only an industry concept, but Lockheed believes that the Missile Defense Agency will show interest because of the weapons under development by potential adversaries. If funding for the THAAD-ER begins in 2020, a system could be produced by 2024 to provide an interim capability against a rudimentary hypersonic threat. The Pentagon is researching whether other technologies like directed energy weapons and railguns are better solutions for missile defense. These are expected to become available in the mid to late 2020s.

== Production ==
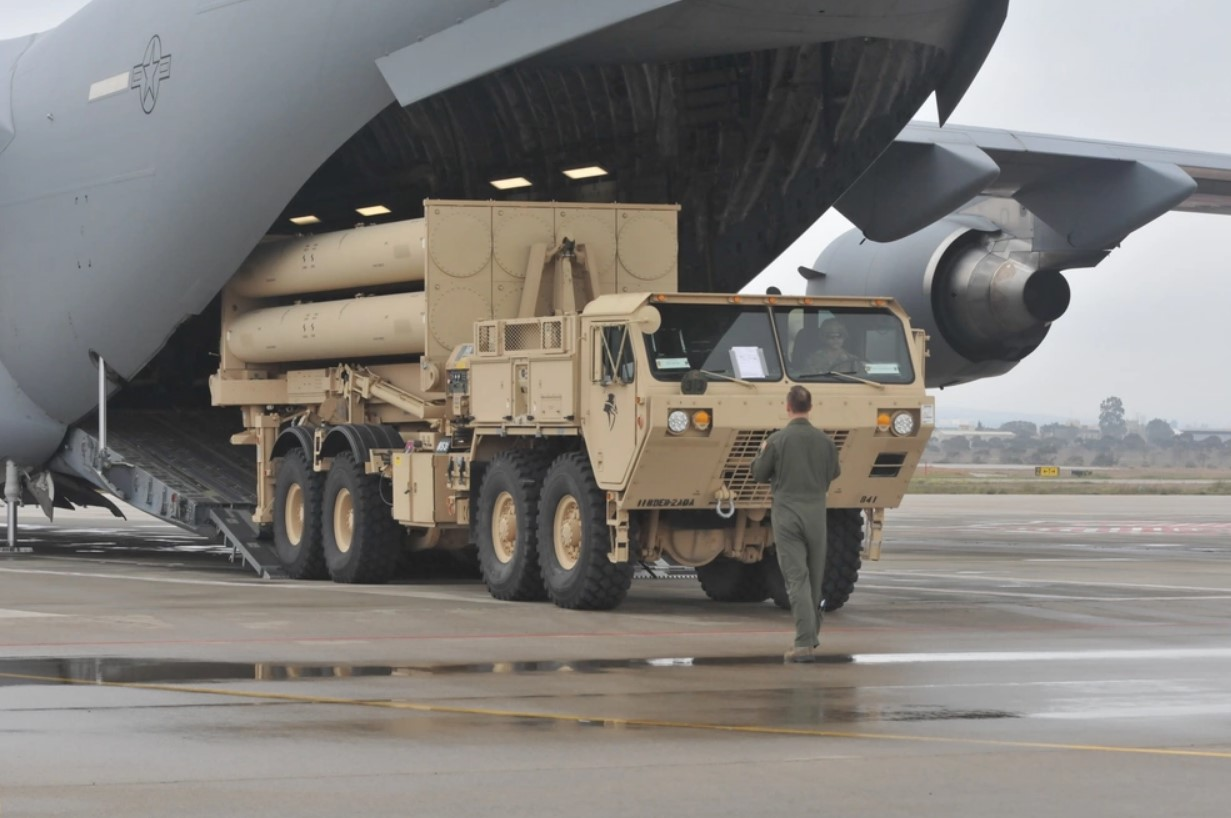
A US Army THAAD transported by a Boeing C-17 Globemaster III

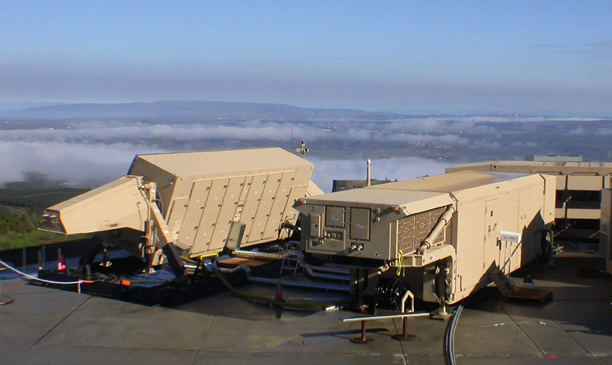
The AN/TPY-2 radar

The THAAD missile destroys missiles by colliding with them, using hit-to-kill (sometimes called kinetic kill) technology, like the MIM-104 Patriot PAC-3, although the PAC-3 also contains a small explosive warhead. This is unlike the Patriot PAC-2, which carried only an explosive warhead detonated using a proximity fuze. Although the actual figures are classified, THAAD missiles have an estimated range of 125 miles (200 km), and can reach an altitude of 93 miles (150 km). A THAAD battery consists of at least six launcher vehicles, each equipped with eight missiles, with two mobile tactical operations centers (TOCs) and the AN/TPY-2 ground-based radar (GBR).

The US Army plans to field at least six THAAD batteries, at a purchase cost of US$800 million per battery. In September 2018, the MDA planned to deliver 52 more interceptors to the Army. In June 2020 the Senate Armed Services Committee draft of the FY2021 DoD budget allocated funding for the eighth THAAD battery.

The THAAD missile is manufactured at a Lockheed Martin facility near Troy, Alabama, which performs final integration, assembly and testing. The radar is an X-band active electronically scanned array radar developed and built by Raytheon at its Andover, Massachusetts Integrated Air Defense Facility. The THAAD radar and a variant developed as a forward sensor for ICBM missile defense, the Forward-Based X-Band – Transportable (FBX-T) radar, were assigned a common designator, AN/TPY-2, in late 2006/early 2007. The THAAD radar can interoperate with Aegis and Patriot systems, in a 3-layer antimissile defense.

=== First units equipped ===
In May 2008, the US Army activated Alpha Battery, 4th Air Defense Artillery Regiment (A-4), 11th Air Defense Artillery Brigade at Fort Bliss, Texas. Battery A-4 is part of the 32nd Army Air & Missile Defense Command. At the time, the battery had 24 THAAD interceptors, three THAAD launchers based on the M1120 HEMTT Load Handling System, a THAAD Fire Control and a THAAD radar. Full fielding began in 2009. In October 2009, the US Army and the Missile Defense Agency activated the second Terminal High Altitude Area Defense Battery, Alpha Battery, 2nd Air Defense Artillery Regiment (A-2), at Fort Bliss.

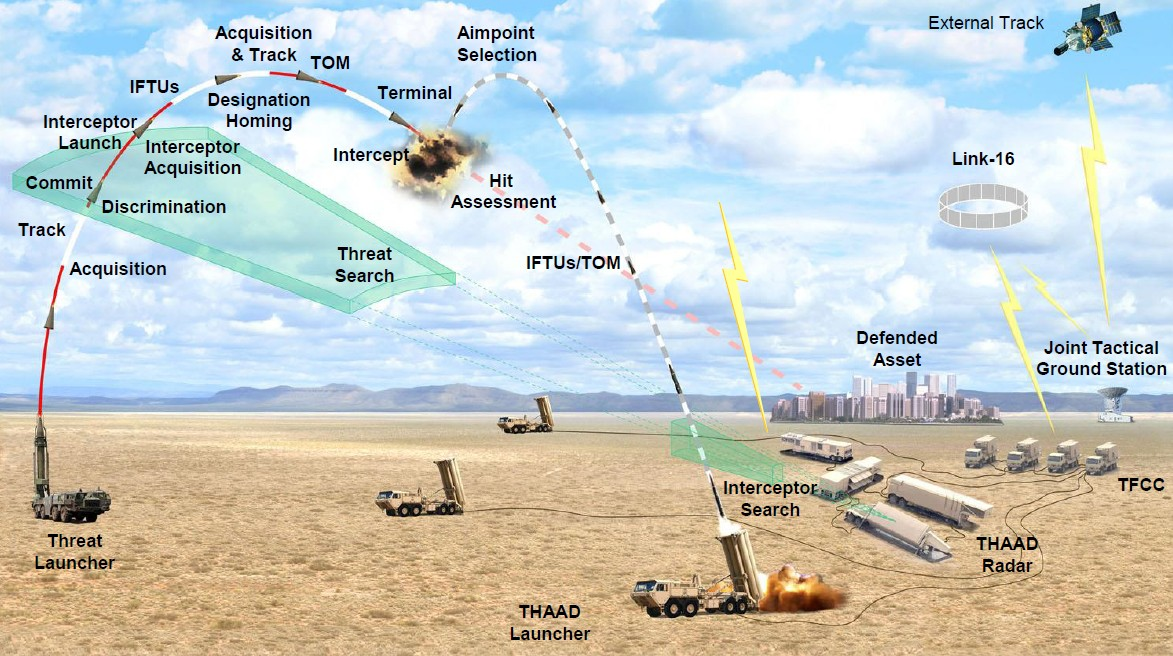
THAAD's threat interception process

In August 2012, Lockheed received a $150 million contract from the Missile Defense Agency (MDA) to produce THAAD weapon system launchers and fire control and communications equipment for the US Army. The contract included 12 launchers, two fire control and communications units, and support equipment. The contract provided six launchers for THAAD Battery 5 and an additional three launchers each to Batteries 1 and 2. These deliveries will bring all batteries to the standard six launcher configuration.

=== General missile defense plans ===
In May 2017, the Pentagon proposed spending $7.9 billion in its FY 2018 budget on missile defense, which includes THAAD interceptors and Patriot interceptors, along with $1.5 billion for Ground-based Midcourse Defense (GMD) against intercontinental ballistic missiles.

== Deployments ==
=== Israel ===
In 2012, the US AN/TPY-2 early missile warning radar station on Mt. Keren in the Negev desert was the only active foreign military installation in Israel.

In March 2019, Bravo Battery, 2nd Air Defense Artillery Regiment (B-2 THAAD), 11th Air Defense Artillery Brigade was deployed at Nevatim Airbase during a joint US–Israeli drill, after which it moved to an undisclosed location in the Negev desert in southern Israel. The X-Band radar system, which is part of the THAAD system, has been deployed at Nevatim since 2008.

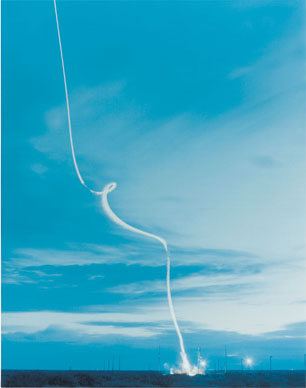
A THAAD Energy Management Steering maneuver, used to burn excess propellant

On 13 October 2024, President Biden directed Secretary of Defense Lloyd Austin to authorize the deployment of a THAAD battery to Israel to "help bolster Israel's air defenses following Iran's unprecedented attacks against Israel on April 13 and again on October 1".

On 27 December 2024, a THAAD battery conducted a successful combat interception of a ballistic missile fired from Yemen.

On 4 May 2025, Israeli sources told the BBC that a THAAD battery had, along with the Arrow system, failed to intercept a hypersonic missile fired at Ben Gurion Airport from Yemen.

On 9 May 2025, for the second time in a week, a THAAD failed to down a Houthi missile. Instead, the missile was shot down by an Arrow long-range air defense system.

On 26 July 2025, reports by The War Zone and The Wall Street Journal stated that approximately 150 THAAD interceptors were fired by US forces during Iran's barrages targeting Israel, representing roughly 25% of all US THAAD interceptors funded to date.

=== Jordan ===
In March 2026, a THAAD radar system was struck and apparently destroyed at Muwaffaq Salti Air Base in the early days of the 2026 Iran war.

=== Romania ===
In 2019, while the Aegis Ashore at NSF Deveselu was being upgraded, B Battery, 62nd Air Defense Artillery Regiment (B-62 THAAD), was emplaced in NSF Deveselu, Romania during the interim.

=== Saudi Arabia ===
In October 2017, the US reached a deal to provide Saudi Arabia with THAAD, in a deal worth $15 billion. The deal included seven fire units, each with a Raytheon AN/TPY-2 radar, two mobile tactical stations (with two spares for a total of 16), six launchers (with two spares for a total of 44), and 360 interceptor missiles.

In July 2025, the Royal Saudi Air Defense Forces inaugurated their first THAAD unit, including a test launch.

In March 2026 a THAAD radar system was damaged at Prince Sultan Air Base in the early days of the 2026 Iran war. It was unclear if the system was owned by the U.S. or Saudi Arabia.

=== South Korea ===
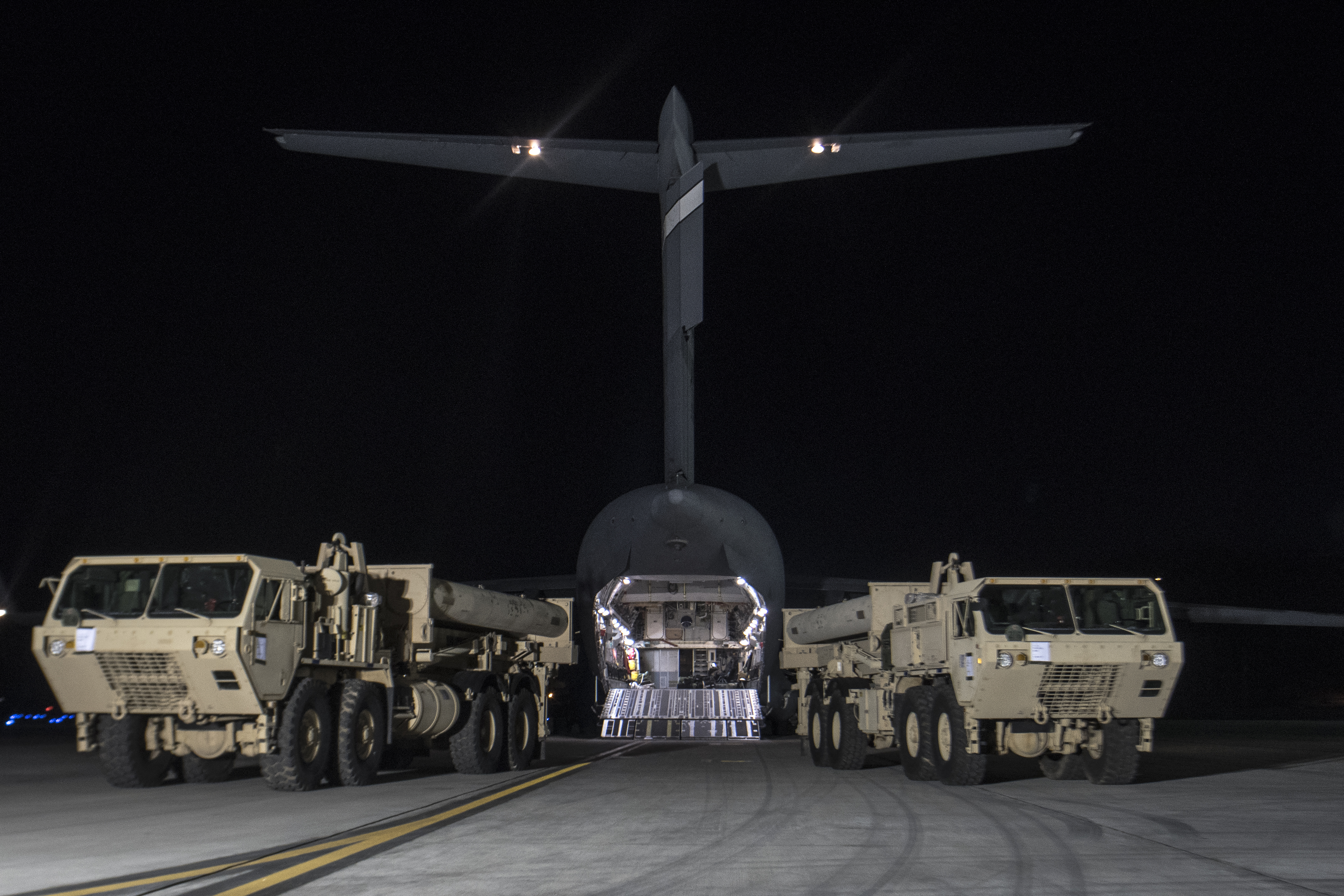
Two THAAD launchers shortly after being flown into South Korea, March 2017

In May 2013 South Korean Defense Ministry officials requested information on the THAAD, as well as other missile interceptors like the Israeli Arrow 3, with the intention of researching systems for domestic technology development rather than for purchase. The Park Geun-hye administration decided in June 2014 it would develop its own indigenous long-range surface-to-air missile instead of buying the THAAD. Officials did however state that American deployment of the THAAD system would help in countering North Korean missile threats.

The deployment was opposed by China and Russia. In February 2016, Chinese Foreign Minister Wang Yi said that having THAAD in South Korea would "shatter the regional strategic balance" and that the system exceeded South Korea's need. In 2017, a Chinese military official said that the deployment had a negative influence on "bilateral military ties and mutual trust" with the United States. The New York Times cited the views of several experts that China has an exaggerated opinion of the range of THAAD's radar and interceptors, and point out that the US has had similar capabilities in Taiwan and Japan for years.

Chinese officials believe that its location in South Korea would allow THAAD's radar to detect Chinese missile launches from behind during their boost phase and differentiate between decoys and warheads, sharing information with the rest of the US-led network. This would erode China's nuclear deterrence, which has a much smaller stockpile compared to the United States and Russia. Missile tests in China usually pointed away from Korea, but that trajectory may also need to be reversed in order to minimize detection by THAAD. Chinese officials asked South Korea to downgrade the radar of the missile defence system, but no adjustments were made.

In July 2016, American and South Korean military officials announced the deployment of THAAD system in South Korea, following ballistic missile and nuclear tests by North Korea. Each THAAD unit consists of six truck-mounted launchers, 48 interceptors, a fire control and communications unit, and an AN/TPY-2 radar. Seongju County in North Gyeongsang Province was chosen as a THAAD site, partly because it is out of range of North Korean rocket artillery along the DMZ. This sparked protests from Seongju County residents, who feared that radiation emitted by the AN/TPY-2 radar would impact their health, and damage the region's famed oriental melon crop. On 30 September 2016, the US and South Korea announced that THAAD would be relocated to the Lotte Skyhill Seongju Country Club, farther from the town's main residential areas and higher in elevation, to alleviate concerns.

On 6 March 2017, two THAAD launcher trucks arrived by air transport at Osan Air Base South Korea, for a deployment. Earlier that day, North Korea had launched 4 missiles. A Reuters article stated that with the THAAD defense system, a North Korean missile barrage would still pose a threat to South Korea, while an article in the International Journal of Space Politics & Policy said that South Korean forces already possess Patriot systems for point defense and Aegis destroyers capable of stopping ballistic missiles that may come from the north, in a three-layer antimissile defense for South Korea. On 16 March 2017, a THAAD radar arrived in South Korea. The THAAD system is kept at Osan Air Base until the site where the system is due to be deployed is prepared, with an expected ready date of June 2017. Osan Air Base has blast-hardened command posts with 3 levels of blast doors.

By 25 April 2017, six trailers carrying the THAAD radar, interceptor launchers, communications, and support equipment entered the Seongju site. On 30 April 2017, it was reported that South Korea would bear the cost of the land and facilities for THAAD, while the US will pay for operating it. On 2 May 2017, Moon Sang-gyun, with the South Korean Defense Ministry, and Col. Robert Manning III, a spokesman for the US military, announced that the THAAD system in Seongju is operational and "has the ability to intercept North Korean missiles and defend South Korea."

It was reported that the system would not reach its full operational potential until later in 2017, when additional elements of the system were onsite. On 7 June 2017, President Moon Jae-in suspended further THAAD deployment pending a review, after discovering four additional launchers had entered South Korea without the defense ministry informing him. The 35th Air Defense Artillery Brigade (United States) has integrated THAAD into its layered defense on the Korean Peninsula, denoted Combined Task Force Defender, composed of both US and ROK personnel.

Even in the face of a North Korean ICBM test on 4 July 2017, which newly threatens Alaska, a Kodiak, Alaska-based THAAD interceptor test (FTT-18) against a simulated attack by an Intermediate Range Ballistic Missile had long been planned. FTT-18 was successfully completed by Battery A-2 THAAD (Battery A, 2nd Air Defense Artillery Regiment, Terminal High Altitude Area Defense) of the 11th Air Defense Artillery Brigade (United States) on 11 July 2017. The soldiers used the procedures of an actual combat scenario and were not aware of the IRBM's launch time.

Also in 2017 another Kodiak launch of a THAAD interceptor was scheduled in July, in preparation for a possible ICBM test by North Korea. On 28 July 2017, North Korea launched a test ICBM capable of reaching Los Angeles. In response, President Moon Jae-in called for deployment of the four remaining THAAD launchers which were put on hold when he came to power.

Lee Jong-kul, of South Korean President Moon Jae-in's Democratic Party of Korea, stated "The nuclear and missile capabilities of North Korea…have been upgraded to pose serious threats; the international cooperation system to keep the North in check has been nullified...", citing tensions over the US deployment of the Terminal High Altitude Area Defense anti-missile system in South Korea. The Atlantic Council, in the June 2017 memorandum "Eliminating the Growing Threat Posed by North Korean Nuclear Weapons" to President Trump, recommended a checklist of actions, including the following declarations to North Korea.

- No use of WMDs, or it will result in a unified Korea under Seoul after the North's assured destruction.
- No export of nuclear equipment or fissile material; it will be intercepted, and the US will respond.
- No missile or missile test aimed at ROK (South Korea), Japan, or the US; it can then be shot down or pre-empted.

On 30 July 2017, a Kodiak-sited THAAD interceptor shot down an MRBM which launched over the Pacific Ocean, the 15th successful test. The Missile Defense Agency (MDA) director emphasized the data collection from the intercept, which enhances the modelling and scenario simulation capabilities of the MDA. John Schilling estimates the current accuracy of the North's Hwasong-14 as poor at the mooted ranges which threaten US cities, which would require more testing to prove its accuracy.

In August 2017, The New York Times reviewed the anti-missile options that are available to counter a planned salvo of four Hwasong-12 missiles, were they to be launched in mid-August 2017 from the North, and aimed to land just outside the territorial waters of Guam, a distance of 2,100 miles (3,400 km), flying at altitudes exceeding 60 miles (100 km), in a flight of 1,065 seconds (18 minutes). These options for the missile defense of South Korea include "sea-based, Patriots and THAAD" according to General John E. Hyten, then commander of US Strategic Command.

On 2 September 2017, the North Korean news agency KCNA released a photograph of an elongated payload, intended to fit in the warhead of one of its missiles. On 3 September 2017, both Japan's Foreign Ministry and the South Korean Joint Chiefs announced the detection of a magnitude 6.3 seismic event, centered near Punggye-ri, which is North Korea's underground nuclear test site. Japan's Foreign Ministry has concluded that the event was the North's sixth nuclear test.

Choe Sang-hun of the New York Times reports that the test was a major embarrassment for China's Paramount leader Xi Jinping, who was hosting a BRICS summit (Brazil, Russia, India, China, and South Africa) in Xiamen, China. Cheng Xiaohe, an expert on North Korea at China's Renmin University, said the timing of the test appears to be deliberate. China's Foreign Ministry urged the North to "stop taking wrong actions", and agreed that further UN actions are needed to resolve the impending crisis. By creating a thermonuclear-capable payload for at least one of its missiles, the North has created a need for THAAD, which is capable of intercepting ICBM threats at the lower altitudes and ranges estimated for a Hwasong-14 ICBM subjected to the load of a heavier warhead needed to carry a thermonuclear weapon.

In October 2017, Battery D, 2nd Air Defense Artillery Regiment, Terminal High Altitude Area Defense, reflagged with the 35th Air Defense Artillery Brigade in preparation for a permanent change of station to South Korea. In the interim before THAAD D-2's permanent transfer to South Korea with their families, THAAD Battery A-4 will deploy to South Korea.

The South Korean decision to deploy THAAD to protect itself against North Korea caused backlash and retaliation measures from China. On 30 October 2017, South Korea and China agreed to normalize relations, previously damaged due to the THAAD deployment.

On 10 March 2026, due to the 2026 Iran war, the U.S. Army began relocating some THAAD interceptor missiles from South Korea to the Middle East.

=== Turkey ===
According to US officials the AN/TPY-2 radar was deployed at Turkey's Kürecik Air Force base. The radar was activated in January 2012.

=== United Arab Emirates ===
In December 2011, the United Arab Emirates (UAE) signed a deal to purchase the missile defense system. The UAE graduated its first two THAAD unit classes at Fort Bliss in 2015 and 2016.

On 17 January 2022, UAE owned THAAD made its first real-world intercept against an incoming Houthi ballistic missile.

During the 2026 Iran war, satellite images showed that the storage structures housing the THAAD at Al Ruwais and Al Sader in Abu Dhabi were damaged by missiles and drones from Iran.

=== United States ===
==== Hawaii ====
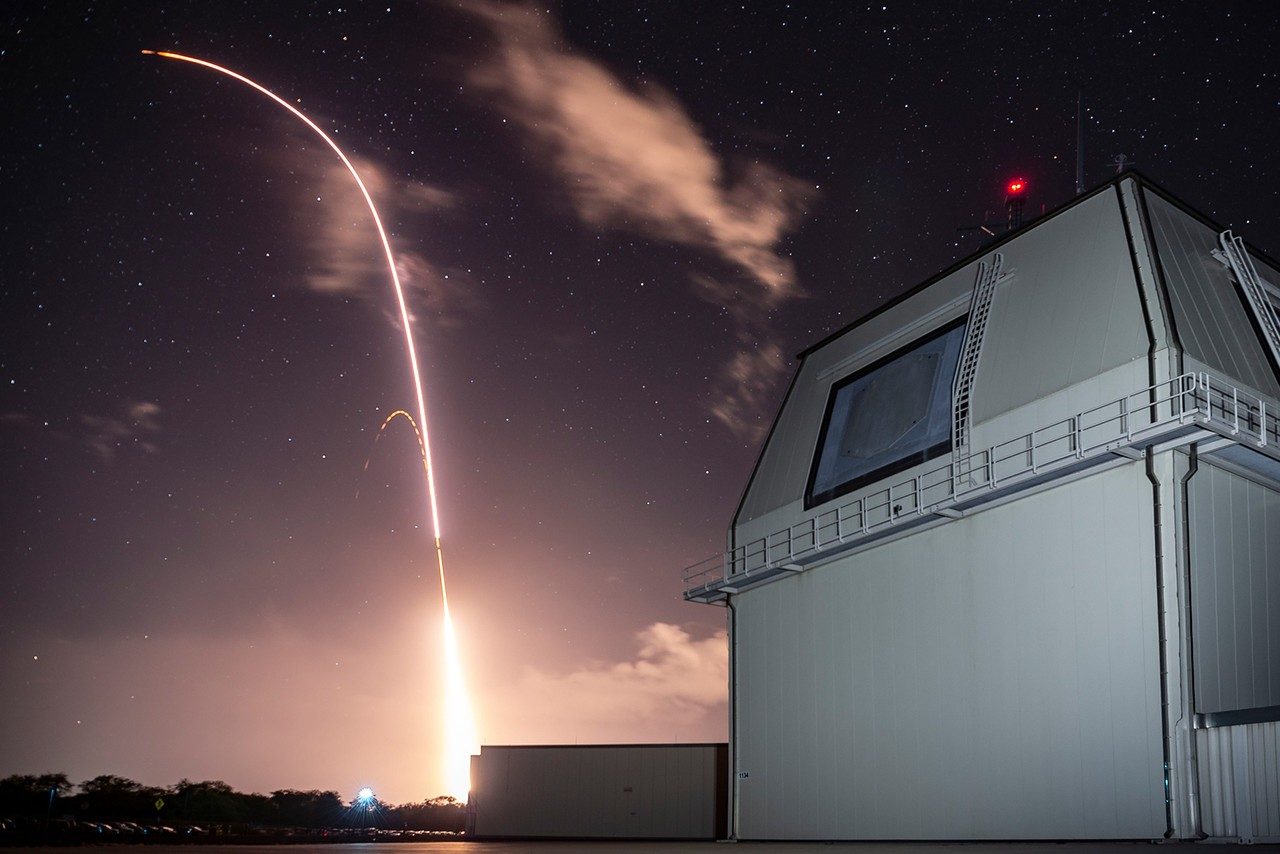
SM 3 Block IIA launched from the Aegis Ashore in Hawaii

In June 2009, the United States deployed a THAAD unit to Hawaii, along with the SBX sea-based radar, to defend against a possible North Korean launch targeting the archipelago.

==== Guam ====
In April 2013, the United States declared that Alpha Battery, 4th Air Defense Artillery Regiment (A-4), would be deployed to Guam to defend against a possible North Korean IRBM attack targeting the island. In March 2014, Alpha Battery, 2nd ADA RGT (A-2), did a change of responsibility with A-4 and took over the Defense of Guam Mission. After a successful 12-month deployment by A-4, Delta 2 (D-2) took its place for a 12-month deployment. In 2018-2019 Echo Battery, 3rd ADA Regiment (E-3) deployed to Guam.

==== Wake Island ====
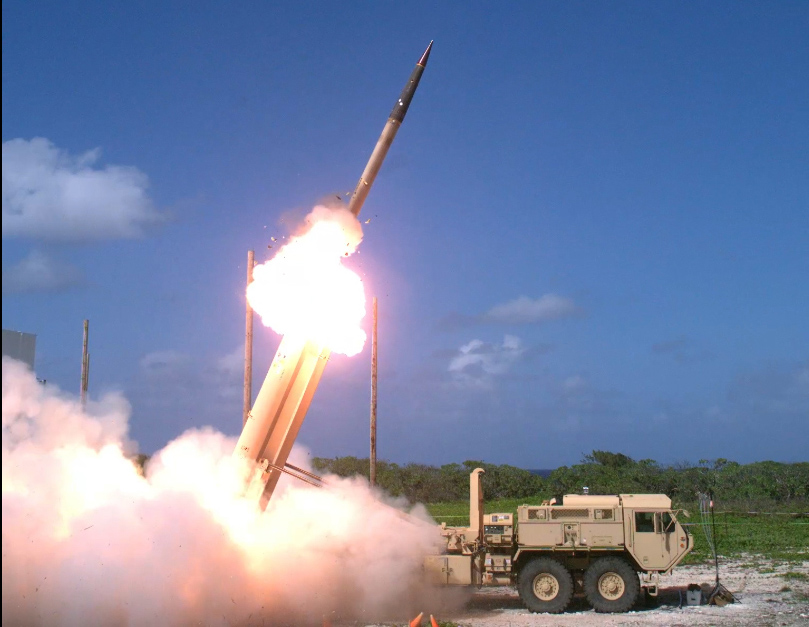
A THAAD interceptor is launched from a THAAD battery on Wake Island during testing where two air-launched ballistic missile targets were successfully intercepted, November 2015.

In November 2015, a THAAD system was a key component of Campaign Fierce Sentry Flight Test Operational-02 Event 2 (FTO-02 E2), a complex $230 million missile defense system test event conducted at Wake Island and the surrounding ocean areas. The objective was to test the ability of the Aegis Ballistic Missile Defense and THAAD weapon systems to defeat a raid of three near-simultaneous air and missile targets, consisting of one medium-range ballistic missile, one short-range ballistic missile and one cruise missile target.

During the test, a THAAD system on Wake Island detected and destroyed a short-range target simulating a short-range ballistic missile that was launched by parachute ejected from a C-17 transport aircraft. At the same time, the THAAD system and USS John Paul Jones guided missile destroyer both launched missiles to intercept a medium-range ballistic missile, launched by parachute from a second C-17.

=== Future deployments ===
==== Europe and the Middle East ====
By March 2016, Army Space and Missile Defense Command was considering THAAD deployments to Europe with EUCOM and the Middle East with CENTCOM.

In May 2013, Oman announced a deal for the acquisition of the THAAD air defense system. However, a sale has not been announced.

During a visit to Qatar on 14 May 2025, US President Donald Trump announced an agreement for Qatar to acquire $42 billion worth of advanced military equipment from the US. A prominent part of this agreement covers the acquisition of THAAD systems to enhance Qatar's missile air defense capabilities.

==== Japan ====
By October 2016, Japan was considering procuring either THAAD or Aegis Ashore to add a new missile defense layer. In May 2017, it was reported that Japan government officials now favor the Aegis Ashore system as it comes with a wider coverage area, which would mean fewer units needed to protect Japan, and it is also cheaper.

At the Center for a New American Security 2017 conference, citing publicly available sources and simulations of strikes against US bases in Asia, two Navy Fellows, Commanders Shugart and Gonzalez, noted that two more Patriot batteries, two more Aegis ships, and five more THAAD batteries would counter China's published SRBM (short-range) and MRBM (medium-range) capabilities against Japan.

Russia has opposed the missile acquisitions and fears that the US will have access to the management of Aegis Ashore missile defense complexes after their deployment in Japan. "We do not know of any cases anywhere in the world when the United States deployed its weapons and transferred control over them to the country in whose territory it all happened. I very much doubt that they will make an exception and in this case," concluded the Russian Foreign Minister.

In 2020, Japan suspended plans to acquire the Aegis Ashore system. The Japanese government said that they were concerned about environmental issues caused by the system dropping spent boosters. Local citizens of the areas chosen to place the system also protested the acquisition, saying that such placement would guarantee strikes on their homes during wartime. the Japanese government had not made it clear whether or not they would re-evaluate purchasing THAAD systems.

==== Taiwan ====
In 2017, a Hong Kong–based media report claimed that THAAD could be deployed in Taiwan to intercept People's Republic of China missiles. However, Taiwan's Foreign Minister, David Lee, said he was unaware of any talks with the US about possible deployment. Local military experts said that it was neither necessary nor affordable for Taiwan to deploy THAAD because China is threatening Taiwan with short-range missiles, whereas THAAD is designed to shoot down medium and long-range missiles.

In March 2017, the Minister of National Defense, Feng Shih-kuan, said that he was firmly opposed to the deployment of a THAAD system in Taiwan. Feng's deputy minister, Cheng De-mei, during a Foreign Affairs and National Defense Committee Q&A session held in April 2017, said that Taiwan did not need a THAAD system in the short term because its US-made phased-array radar system at Hsinchu County's Leshan base was on par with the THAAD system in terms of detection capability; this was described as being "in slight contrast with Minister of National Defense Feng Shih-kuan's last month".

Freddy Lim urged the ministry during the same Q&A session "to procure whatever is necessary to ensure the nation's defense capabilities, which could not be compromised due to China's pressure." Taiwan's existing early warning system, built by the manufacturer of the THAAD radar, can serve to counter China's missile launches.

== Operators ==
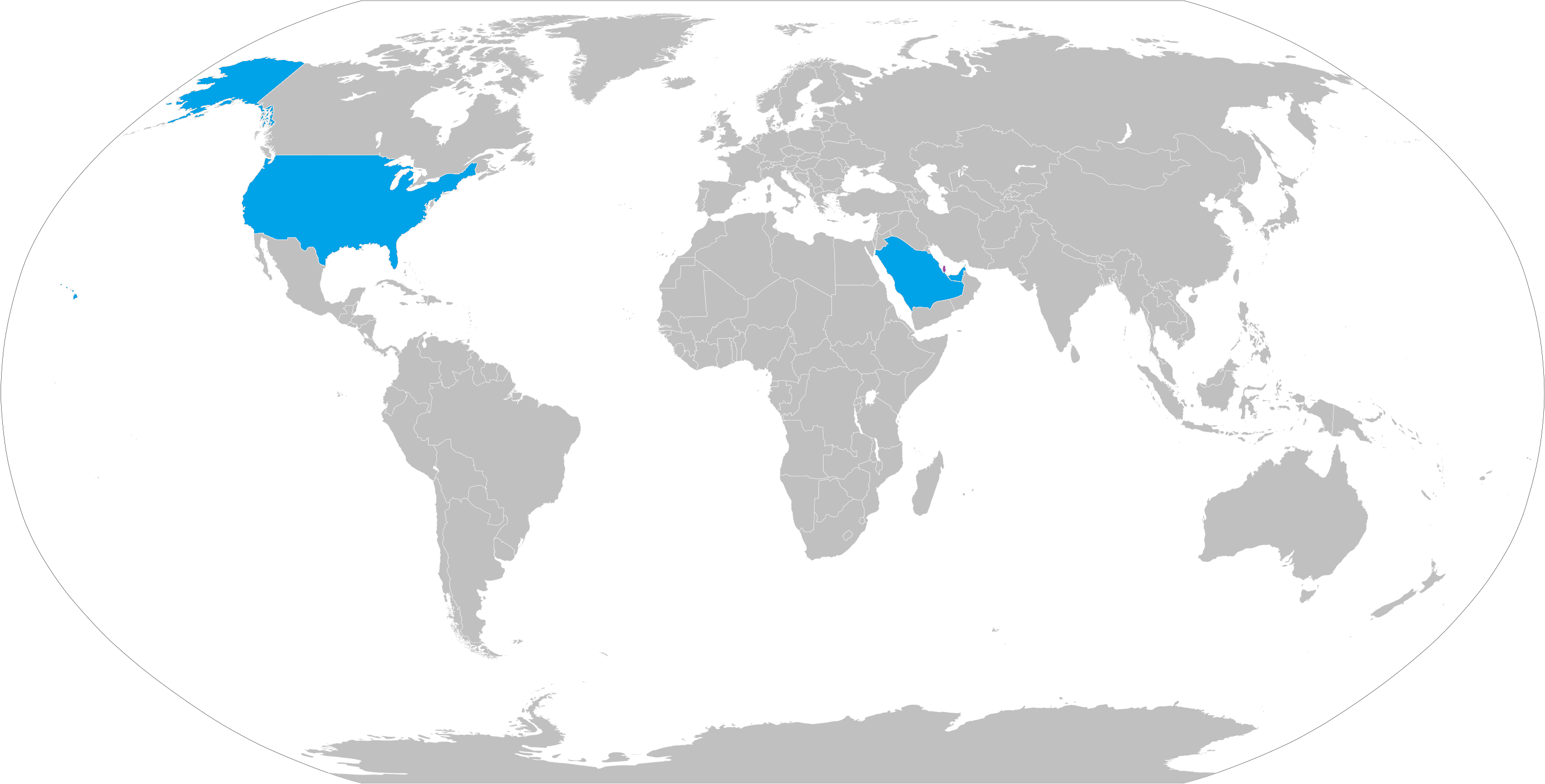
Current operators: US, Saudi Arabia, UAE Future Users: Qatar

=== Current ===
Jordan

- One battery, damaged in 2026 by attacks by Iran

Saudi Arabia

- Royal Saudi Air Defense Forces – First battery activated in July 2025, 6 more to be procured.

United Arab Emirates

- United Arab Emirates Air Force – 2 batteries, both potentially damaged in 2026 by attacks by Iran

United States

- United States Army – 8 batteries, with at least two outside the continental United States
  - A Battery, 2nd Air Defense Artillery Regiment (A-2 ADA), at Fort Bliss (TX)
  - B Battery, 2nd Air Defense Artillery Regiment (B-2 ADA), at Fort Bliss (TX)
  - D Battery, 2nd Air Defense Artillery Regiment (D-2 ADA), at Camp Carroll (South Korea)
  - E Battery, 3rd Air Defense Artillery Regiment (E-3 ADA), at Andersen Air Force Base (Guam)
  - A Battery, 4th Air Defense Artillery Regiment (A-4 ADA), at Fort Bliss (TX)
  - B Battery, 62nd Air Defense Artillery Regiment (B-62 ADA), at Fort Hood (TX)
  - E Battery, 62nd Air Defense Artillery Regiment (E-62 ADA), at Fort Hood (TX)

=== Future ===
Qatar

- Qatar is reportedly set to acquire THAAD. This was announced by US President Donald Trump during his visit to the country in May 2025.

== See also ==
- Arrow (Israeli missile)
- Comparison of anti-ballistic missile systems
- HQ-19 – (China)
- L-SAM – (South Korea)
- MIM-104 Patriot – (United States)
- Prithvi Defence Vehicle—Indian high altitude anti-ballistic missile system
- Project Kusha, under development by India
- S-300VM – (Russia)
- S-500 – (Russia)
- Taiwan Sky Bow Ballistic Missile Defense System
