= 1998 in spaceflight =

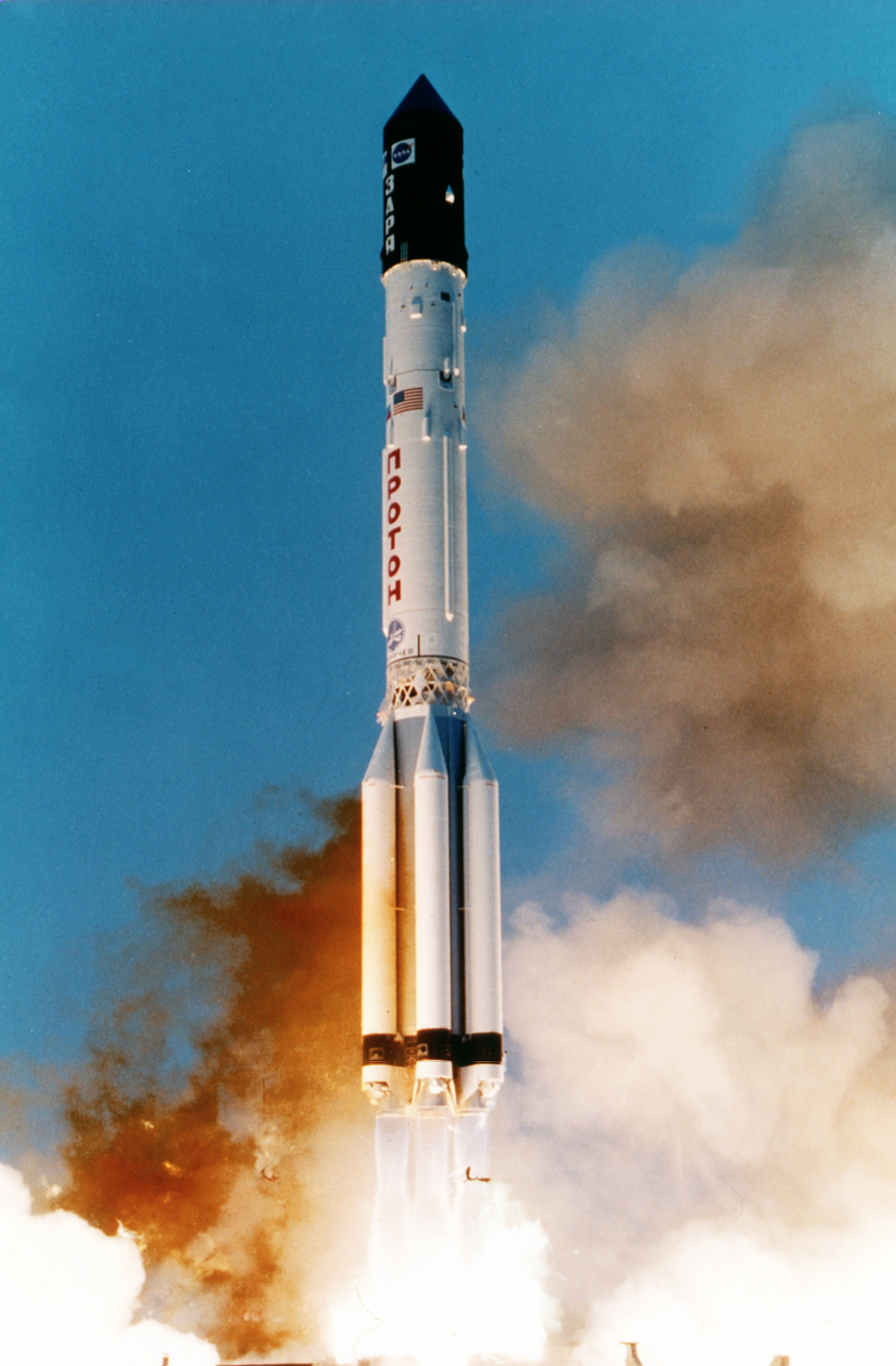
- A Proton-K launches Zarya, the first module of the International Space Station

Orbital launches
- First: 7 January
- Last: 30 December
- Total: 82
- Successes: 75
- Failures: 5
- Partial failures: 2
- Catalogued: 77

National firsts
- Satellite: Egypt; Chile
- Space traveller: Spain

Rockets
- Maiden flights: Athena II; Delta II 7326; Delta II 7420; Delta II 7425; Delta III; Shtil'
- Retirements: Atlas II; Titan IVA

Crewed flights
- Orbital: 7
- Total travellers: 39

1998 in spaceflight

This article outlines notable events occurring in 1998 in spaceflight, including major launches and EVAs.

== Zarya launch ==
Zarya was launched on 20 November 1998 atop a Russian Proton-K rocket from Baikonur Cosmodrome Site 81 in Kazakhstan, into a 400-kilometer (250 mi) orbit, with a planned operational lifetime of at least 15 years.

== Orbital launches ==
- ← Jan
- Feb
- Mar
- Apr
- May
- Jun
- Jul
- Aug
- Sep
- Oct
- Nov
- Dec →

Date and time (UTC)	Rocket	Flight number	Launch site		LSP	
Date and time (UTC)	Payload (⚀ = CubeSat)	Operator	Orbit	Function	Decay (UTC)	Outcome
Date and time (UTC)	Remarks					
=== January ===
7 January; 02:28	(United States) Athena II		(United States) Spaceport Florida LC-46		(United States) Lockheed Martin	
7 January; 02:28	(United States) Lunar Prospector	NASA	Selenocentric	Lunar orbiter	31 July 1999	Successful
7 January; 02:28	Maiden flight of Athena II, first orbital launch from Spaceport Florida					
10 January; 00:32	(United States) Delta II 7925-9.5		(United States) Cape Canaveral SLC-17B		(United States) Boeing IDS	
10 January; 00:32	(United Kingdom) Skynet 4D	MoD	Geosynchronous	Communications	In orbit	Operational
22 January; 12:56	(Israel) Shavit		(Israel) Palmachim		(Israel) ISA	
22 January; 12:56	(Israel) Ofeq-4		Intended: Low Earth (retrograde)	Reconnaissance	22 January	Launch Failure
22 January; 12:56	Second stage failure					
23 January; 02:48	(United States) Space Shuttle Endeavour		(United States) Kennedy LC-39A		(United States) United Space Alliance	
23 January; 02:48	(United States) STS-89	NASA	Low Earth (Mir)	Shuttle-Mir Program	31 January; 16:57	Successful
23 January; 02:48	(United States) SpaceHab Logistics Double Module	NASA/SpaceHab	Low Earth (Endeavour)	Logistics	31 January; 16:57	Successful
23 January; 02:48	Crewed orbital flight with seven astronauts					
29 January; 16:33	(Russia) Soyuz-U		(Kazakhstan) Baikonur Site 1/5		(Russia) Roskosmos	
29 January; 16:33	(Russia) Soyuz TM-27	Roskosmos	Low Earth (Mir)	Mir EO-25	25 August; 05:24	Successful
29 January; 16:33	Crewed orbital flight with three cosmonauts					
29 January; 18:37	(United States) Atlas IIA		(United States) Cape Canaveral SLC-36A		(United States)	
29 January; 18:37	(United States) USA-137 (SDS-3-1)	NRO	Molniya	Communications	In orbit	Operational
29 January; 18:37	NRO Launch 5					
=== February ===
4 February; 23:29	(France) Ariane 4 44LP		(France) Kourou ELA-2		(France) Arianespace	
4 February; 23:29	(Brazil) Brazilsat B3	Embratel	Geostationary	Communications	In orbit	Operational
4 February; 23:29	(United Kingdom) Inmarsat 3F5	Inmarsat	Geostationary	Communications	In orbit	Operational
10 February; 13:20	(United States) Taurus 2210		(United States) Vandenberg LC-576E		(United States) Orbital Sciences	
10 February; 13:20	(United States) GFO	US Navy	Low Earth	Radar altimetry	In orbit	Operational
10 February; 13:20	(United States) Orbcomm G1	Orbcomm	Low Earth	Communications	In orbit	Operational
10 February; 13:20	(United States) Orbcomm G2	Orbcomm	Low Earth	Communications	In orbit	Operational
10 February; 13:20	(United States) Celestis-02	Celestis	Low Earth	Space burial	In orbit	Successful
14 February; 14:34	(United States) Delta II 7420-10C		(United States) Cape Canaveral SLC-17A		(United States) Boeing IDS	
14 February; 14:34	(United States) Globalstar 1	Globalstar	Low Earth	Communications	In orbit	Operational
14 February; 14:34	(United States) Globalstar 4	Globalstar	Low Earth	Communications	In orbit	Operational
14 February; 14:34	(United States) Globalstar 2	Globalstar	Low Earth	Communications	In orbit	Operational
14 February; 14:34	(United States) Globalstar 3	Globalstar	Low Earth	Communications	In orbit	Operational
14 February; 14:34	Maiden flight of Delta II 7420					
17 February; 10:34	(Russia) Soyuz-U		(Kazakhstan) Baikonur Site 31/6		(Russia)	
17 February; 10:34	(Russia) Kosmos 2349 (Yantar)		Low Earth	Cartography	2 April	Successful
18 February; 13:58	(United States) Delta II 7920-10C		(United States) Vandenberg SLC-2W		(United States) Boeing IDS	
18 February; 13:58	(United States) Iridium 52	Iridium	Low Earth	Communications	5 November 2018	Successful
18 February; 13:58	(United States) Iridium 56	Iridium	Low Earth	Communications	11 October 2018	Successful
18 February; 13:58	(United States) Iridium 54	Iridium	Low Earth	Communications	11 May 2019	Successful
18 February; 13:58	(United States) Iridium 50	Iridium	Low Earth	Communications	23 September 2018	Successful
18 February; 13:58	(United States) Iridium 53	Iridium	Low Earth	Communications	30 September 2018	Successful
21 February; 07:55	(Japan) H-II		(Japan) Tanegashima LA-Y		(Japan) NASDA	
21 February; 07:55	(Japan) Kakehashi (COMETS)	NASDA	Intended: Geosynchronous; Actual: Medium Earth	Communications	In orbit	Partial Failure
21 February; 07:55	Upper stage failure led to lower orbit than planned					
26 February; 07:07	(United States) Pegasus-XL		(United States) Stargazer, Vandenberg		(United States) Orbital Sciences	
26 February; 07:07	(United States) SNOE	NASA/UC Boulder	Low Earth	Nitric Oxide research	13 December 2003	Successful
26 February; 07:07	(United States) Teledesic 1	Teledesic	Low Earth	Communications	9 October 2000	Successful
27 February; 22:38	(France) Ariane 4 42P		(France) Kourou ELA-2		(France) Arianespace	
27 February; 22:38	(France) Hot Bird 4	Eutelsat	Geosynchronous	Communications	In orbit	Operational
28 February; 00:21	(United States) Atlas IIAS		(United States) Cape Canaveral SLC-36B		(Russia) (United States) International Launch Services	
28 February; 00:21	(United Nations) Intelsat 806	Intelsat	Geosynchronous	Communications	In orbit	Operational
=== March ===
14 March; 22:45	(Russia) Soyuz-U		(Kazakhstan) Baikonur Site 1/5		(Russia) Roskosmos	
14 March; 22:45	(Russia) Progress M-38	Roskosmos	Low Earth (Mir)	Logistics	15 May	Successful
14 March; 22:45	(Russia) VDU 2	Roskosmos	Low Earth (Mir)	Mir attitude control unit	23 March 2001; 05:50	Successful
16 March; 21:32	(United States) Atlas II		(United States) Cape Canaveral SLC-36A		(United States)	
16 March; 21:32	(United States) USA-138 (UHF F/O F8)	US Navy	Geosynchronous	Communications	In orbit	Operational
16 March; 21:32	Final flight of baseline Atlas II					
24 March; 01:46	(France) Ariane 4 40		(France) Kourou ELA-2		(France) Arianespace	
24 March; 01:46	(France) SPOT 4	CNES	Sun-synchronous	Earth Imaging	In orbit	Operational
25 March; 17:01	(China) Long March 2C		(China) Taiyuan LC-1		(China)	
25 March; 17:01	(United States) Iridium 51	Iridium	Low Earth	Communications	In orbit	Operational
25 March; 17:01	(United States) Iridium 61	Iridium	Low Earth	Communications	23 July 2019	Successful
30 March; 06:02	(United States) Delta II 7920-10C		(United States) Vandenberg SLC-2W		(United States) Boeing IDS	
30 March; 06:02	(United States) Iridium 55	Iridium	Low Earth	Communications	31 March 2019	Successful
30 March; 06:02	(United States) Iridium 57	Iridium	Low Earth	Communications	In orbit	Operational
30 March; 06:02	(United States) Iridium 58	Iridium	Low Earth	Communications	7 April 2019	Successful
30 March; 06:02	(United States) Iridium 59	Iridium	Low Earth	Communications	11 March 2019	Successful
30 March; 06:02	(United States) Iridium 60	Iridium	Low Earth	Communications	17 March 2019	Successful
=== April ===
2 April; 02:42	(United States) Pegasus-XL		(United States) Stargazer, Vandenberg		(United States) Orbital Sciences	
2 April; 02:42	(United States) TRACE	NASA	Low Earth	Solar research	In orbit	Operational
7 April; 02:13	(Russia) Proton-K/DM2		(Kazakhstan) Baikonur Site 81/23		(Russia) (United States) International Launch Services	
7 April; 02:13	(United States) Iridium 62	Iridium	Low Earth	Communications	7 November 2018	Successful
7 April; 02:13	(United States) Iridium 63	Iridium	Low Earth	Communications	In orbit	Operational
7 April; 02:13	(United States) Iridium 64	Iridium	Low Earth	Communications	1 April 2019	Successful
7 April; 02:13	(United States) Iridium 65	Iridium	Low Earth	Communications	19 July 2018	Successful
7 April; 02:13	(United States) Iridium 66	Iridium	Low Earth	Communications	23 August 2018	Successful
7 April; 02:13	(United States) Iridium 67	Iridium	Low Earth	Communications	2 July 2018	Successful
7 April; 02:13	(United States) Iridium 68	Iridium	Low Earth	Communications	6 June 2018	Successful
17 April; 18:19	(United States) Space Shuttle Columbia		(United States) Kennedy LC-39B		(United States) United Space Alliance	
17 April; 18:19	(United States) STS-90	NASA	Low Earth	Microgravity research	3 May; 16:09	Successful
17 April; 18:19	(United States) Spacelab LM-2 (Neurolab)	NASA	Low Earth (Columbia)	Life science research	3 May; 16:09	Successful
17 April; 18:19	(United States) EDO Pallet	NASA	Low Earth (Columbia)	Cryogenic mission duration extension pallet	3 May; 16:09	Successful
17 April; 18:19	Crewed orbital flight with seven astronauts Final flight of Spacelab Long Module No. 2					
24 April; 22:38	(United States) Delta II 7420-10C		(United States) Cape Canaveral SLC-17A		(United States) Boeing IDS	
24 April; 22:38	(United States) Globalstar 14	Globalstar	Low Earth	Communications	In orbit	Operational
24 April; 22:38	(United States) Globalstar 6	Globalstar	Low Earth	Communications	In orbit	Operational
24 April; 22:38	(United States) Globalstar 15	Globalstar	Low Earth	Communications	In orbit	Operational
24 April; 22:38	(United States) Globalstar 8	Globalstar	Low Earth	Communications	In orbit	Operational
28 April; 22:53	(France) Ariane 4 44P		(France) Kourou ELA-2		(France) Arianespace	
28 April; 22:53	(Egypt) Nilesat 101	Nilesat	Geosynchronous	Communications	In orbit	Operational
28 April; 22:53	(Japan) BSAT-1B	BSAT	Geosynchronous	Communications	In orbit	Operational
28 April; 22:53	Nilesat is the first Egyptian satellite					
29 April; 04:36	(Russia) Proton-K/DM-2		(Kazakhstan) Baikonur Site 200/39		(Russia) RVSN	
29 April; 04:36	(Russia) Kosmos 2350 (Prognoz SPRN)	RVSN	Geosynchronous	Communications	In orbit	Operational
=== May ===
2 May; 09:16	(China) Long March 2C		(China) Taiyuan LC-1		(China)	
2 May; 09:16	(United States) Iridium 69	Iridium	Low Earth	Communications	In orbit	Operational
2 May; 09:16	(United States) Iridium 71	Iridium	Low Earth	Communications	In orbit	Operational
7 May; 08:53	(Russia) Molniya-M		(Russia) Plesetsk Site 16/2		(Russia)	
7 May; 08:53	(Russia) Kosmos 2351 (Oko)	MO RF	Molniya	Early Warning	In orbit	Operational
7 May; 23:45	(Russia) Proton-K/DM-2M		(Kazakhstan) Baikonur Site 81/23		(Russia) (United States) International Launch Services	
7 May; 23:45	(United States) EchoStar 4	EchoStar	Geosynchronous	Communications	In orbit	Operational
9 May; 01:38	(United States) Titan IVB 401/Centaur		(United States) Cape Canaveral SLC-40		(United States) Lockheed Martin	
9 May; 01:38	(United States) USA-139 / Orion 4	NRO	Geosynchronous	SIGINT	In orbit	Operational
9 May; 01:38	NROL-6 mission.					
13 May; 15:52	(United States) Titan 23G		(United States) Vandenberg SLC-4W		(United States) Lockheed Martin	
13 May; 15:52	(United States) NOAA-15 (NOAA-K)	NOAA	Sun-synchronous	Weather satellite	In orbit	Operational
14 May; 22:12	(Russia) Soyuz-U		(Kazakhstan) Baikonur Site 1/5		(Russia) Roskosmos	
14 May; 22:12	(Russia) Progress M-39	Roskosmos	Low Earth (Mir)	Logistics	29 October; 04:14	Successful
17 May; 21:16	(United States) Delta II 7920-10C		(United States) Vandenberg SLC-2W		(United States) Boeing IDS	
17 May; 21:16	(United States) Iridium 70	Iridium	Low Earth	Communications	11 October 2018	Successful
17 May; 21:16	(United States) Iridium 72	Iridium	Low Earth	Communications	14 May 2018	Successful
17 May; 21:16	(United States) Iridium 73	Iridium	Low Earth	Communications	In orbit	Operational
17 May; 21:16	(United States) Iridium 74	Iridium	Low Earth	Communications	11 June 2017	Successful
17 May; 21:16	(United States) Iridium 75	Iridium	Low Earth	Communications	10 July 2018	Successful
30 May; 10:00	(China) Long March 3B		(China) Xichang LC-2		(China)	
30 May; 10:00	(China) Zhongwei 1 (ChinaStar 1)	COTSC	Geosynchronous	Communications	In orbit	Operational
=== June ===
2 June; 22:06	(United States) Space Shuttle Discovery		(United States) Kennedy LC-39A		(United States) United Space Alliance	
2 June; 22:06	(United States) STS-91	NASA	Low Earth (Mir)	Shuttle-Mir flight	12 June; 18:00	Successful
2 June; 22:06	(United States) SpaceHab Logistics Double Module	NASA/SpaceHab	Low Earth (Discovery)	Logistics	12 June; 18:00	Successful
2 June; 22:06	AMS-01	ESA	Low Earth (Discovery)	Particle physics	12 June; 18:00	Successful
2 June; 22:06	Crewed orbital flight with six astronauts, landing with seven Final Shuttle-Mir flight and first shuttle flight with Super-lightweight Aluminium/Lithium ET					
10 June; 00:35	(United States) Delta II 7925-9.5		(United States) Cape Canaveral SLC-17A		(United States) Boeing IDS	
10 June; 00:35	(Norway) Thor 3	Telenor	Geosynchronous	Communications	In orbit	Operational
15 June; 22:58	(Ukraine) Tsyklon-3		(Russia) Plesetsk Site 32		(Russia)	
15 June; 22:58	(Russia) Kosmos 2352 (Strela-3)	MO RF	Intended: Medium Earth; Actual: Low Earth	Communications	In orbit	Partial Failure
15 June; 22:58	(Russia) Kosmos 2353 (Strela-3)	MO RF	Intended: Medium Earth; Actual: Low Earth	Communications	In orbit	Partial Failure
15 June; 22:58	(Russia) Kosmos 2354 (Strela-3)	MO RF	Intended: Medium Earth; Actual: Low Earth	Communications	In orbit	Partial Failure
15 June; 22:58	(Russia) Kosmos 2355 (Strela-3)	MO RF	Intended: Medium Earth; Actual: Low Earth	Communications	In orbit	Partial Failure
15 June; 22:58	(Russia) Kosmos 2356 (Strela-3)	MO RF	Intended: Medium Earth; Actual: Low Earth	Communications	In orbit	Partial Failure
15 June; 22:58	(Russia) Kosmos 2357 (Strela-3)	MO RF	Intended: Medium Earth; Actual: Low Earth	Communications	In orbit	Partial Failure
15 June; 22:58	Third stage failure left satellites in lower orbit than planned					
18 June; 22:48	(United States) Atlas IIAS		(United States) Cape Canaveral SLC-36A		(Russia) (United States) International Launch Services	
18 June; 22:48	(United Nations) Intelsat 805	Intelsat	Geosynchronous	Communications	In orbit	Operational
24 June; 18:29	(Russia) Soyuz-U		(Russia) Plesetsk Site 43/3		(Russia)	
24 June; 18:29	(Russia) Kosmos 2358 (Yantar)	MO RF	Low Earth	Reconnaissance	22 October	Successful
25 June; 14:00	(Russia) Soyuz-U		(Kazakhstan) Baikonur Site 31/6		(Russia)	
25 June; 14:00	(Russia) Kosmos 2359 (Yantar)	MO RF	Low Earth	Reconnaissance	12 July 1999	Successful
=== July ===
1 July; 00:48	(Russia) Molniya-M		(Russia) Plesetsk Site 43/3		(Russia)	
1 July; 00:48	(Russia) Molniya 3–49	MOM	Molniya	Communications	2 February 2011	Successful
3 July; 18:12	(Japan) M-V		(Japan) Uchinoura		(Japan) ISAS	
3 July; 18:12	(Japan) Nozomi (PLANET-B)	ISAS	Intended: Areocentric; Actual: Heliocentric	Mars orbiter	In orbit	Spacecraft failure
3 July; 18:12	Gravity assist produced less velocity than expected, spacecraft ran out of fuel trying to compensate					
7 July; 03:15	(Russia) Shtil'		(Russia) Novomoskovsk (K-407), Barents Sea		(Russia)	
7 July; 03:15	(Germany) Tubsat-N	TUB	Low Earth	Communications	23 April 2002	Successful
7 July; 03:15	(Germany) Tubsat-N1	TUB	Low Earth	Communications	21 October 2000	Successful
7 July; 03:15	(Russia) Shtil 1	Makeev	Low Earth	Measure carrier rocket performance	8 May 2014	Successful
7 July; 03:15	Maiden flight of Shtil' and first orbital launch from a submarine					
10 July; 06:30	(Ukraine) Zenit-2		(Kazakhstan) Baikonur Site 45/1		(Russia)	
10 July; 06:30	(Russia) Resurs-O1 4		Low Earth	Remote sensing	In orbit	Operational
10 July; 06:30	(Chile) Fasat-Bravo	FACh	Low Earth	Communications	In orbit	Operational
10 July; 06:30	TMSAT		Low Earth	Communications	In orbit	Operational
10 July; 06:30	(Israel) Gurwin Techsat 1B	Technion	Low Earth	Technology development	In orbit	Operational
10 July; 06:30	WESTPAC	WPLTN	Low Earth	Laser tracking	In orbit	Operational
10 July; 06:30	(Germany) SAFIR-2	DLR	Low Earth	Communications	In orbit	Operational
10 July; 06:30	Fasat-Bravo is the first successful Chilean satellite					
18 July; 09:20	(China) Long March 3B		(China) Xichang LC-2		(China)	
18 July; 09:20	(China) Sinosat-1	SinoSat	Geosynchronous	Communications	In orbit	Operational
28 July; 09:15	(Ukraine) Zenit-2		(Kazakhstan) Baikonur Site 45/1		(Russia)	
28 July; 09:15	(Russia) Kosmos 2360 (Tselina-2)	MO RF	Low Earth	SIGINT	In orbit	Operational
=== August ===
2 August; 16:24	(United States) Pegasus-XL/HAPS		(United States) Stargazer, Wallops Flight Facility		(United States) Orbital Sciences	
2 August; 16:24	(United States) Orbcomm B5	Orbcomm	Low Earth	Communications	In orbit	Operational
2 August; 16:24	(United States) Orbcomm B6	Orbcomm	Low Earth	Communications	In orbit	Operational
2 August; 16:24	(United States) Orbcomm B7	Orbcomm	Low Earth	Communications	In orbit	Operational
2 August; 16:24	(United States) Orbcomm B8	Orbcomm	Low Earth	Communications	In orbit	Operational
2 August; 16:24	(United States) Orbcomm B4	Orbcomm	Low Earth	Communications	22 December 2018; 07:12	Successful
2 August; 16:24	(United States) Orbcomm B3	Orbcomm	Low Earth	Communications	In orbit	Operational
2 August; 16:24	(United States) Orbcomm B2	Orbcomm	Low Earth	Communications	In orbit	Operational
2 August; 16:24	(United States) Orbcomm B1	Orbcomm	Low Earth	Communications	In orbit	Operational
2 August; 16:24	The decommissioned Orbcomm B4 satellite disintegrated into 34 pieces in 2018; the cause is under investigation as of January 2019					
12 August; 11:30	(United States) Titan IVA 401/Centaur		(United States) Cape Canaveral SLC-41		(United States) Lockheed Martin	
12 August; 11:30	(United States) Mercury-3		Intended: Geosynchronous	ELINT	12 August; T+40 seconds	Launch Failure
12 August; 11:30	Final flight of Titan IVA; Control lost after guidance system malfunction; Range Safety self-destruct					
13 August; 09:43	(Russia) Soyuz-U		(Kazakhstan) Baikonur Site 1/5		(Russia) Roskosmos	
13 August; 09:43	(Russia) Soyuz TM-28	Roskosmos	Low Earth (Mir)	Mir EO-26	28 February 1999; 02:14	Successful
13 August; 09:43	Crewed orbital flight with three cosmonauts					
19 August; 23:01	(China) Long March 2C		(China) Taiyuan LC-1		(China)	
19 August; 23:01	(United States) Iridium 3	Iridium	Low Earth	Communications	8 February 2018	Successful
19 August; 23:01	(United States) Iridium 76	Iridium	Low Earth	Communications	28 August 2018	Successful
25 August; 23:07	(France) Ariane 4 44P		(France) Kourou ELA-2		(France) Arianespace	
25 August; 23:07	(Singapore) (Taiwan) ST-1	Singapore Telecom/Chunghwa Telecom	Geosynchronous	Communications	In orbit	Operational
27 August; 01:17	(United States) Delta III 8930		(United States) Cape Canaveral SLC-17B		(United States) Boeing IDS	
27 August; 01:17	(United States) Galaxy 10	PanAmSat	Intended: Geosynchronous	Communications	27 August; T+75 seconds	Launch Failure
27 August; 01:17	Maiden flight of Delta III; Hydraulic failure in thrust vectoring system led to range safety self-destruct					
30 August; 00:31	(Russia) Proton-K/DM-2M		(Kazakhstan) Baikonur Site 81/23		(Russia) (United States) International Launch Services	
30 August; 00:31	(Luxembourg) Astra 2A	SES	Geosynchronous	Communications	In orbit	Operational
31 August; 03:07	(North Korea) Paektusan-1		(North Korea) Musudan-ri		(North Korea)	
31 August; 03:07	(North Korea) Kwangmyŏngsŏng-1	KCST	Intended: Low Earth	Communications	31 August	Launch failure
31 August; 03:07	First North Korean orbital launch attempt, never achieved orbit due to a suspected third stage failure. North Korea considered the launch as successful.					
=== September ===
8 September; 21:13	(United States) Delta II 7920-10C		(United States) Vandenberg SLC-2W		(United States) Boeing IDS	
8 September; 21:13	(United States) Iridium 82	Iridium	Low Earth	Communications	In orbit	Operational
8 September; 21:13	(United States) Iridium 81	Iridium	Low Earth	Communications	17 July 2018	Successful
8 September; 21:13	(United States) Iridium 80	Iridium	Low Earth	Communications	12 August 2018	Successful
8 September; 21:13	(United States) Iridium 79	Iridium	Low Earth	Communications	29 November 2000	Spacecraft Failure
8 September; 21:13	(United States) Iridium 77	Iridium	Low Earth	Communications	22 September 2017	Spacecraft Failure
9 September; 20:29	(Ukraine) Zenit-2		(Kazakhstan) Baikonur Site 45/1		(Russia)	
9 September; 20:29	(United States) Globalstar 5	Globalstar	Intended: Low Earth	Communications	9 September	Launch Failure
9 September; 20:29	(United States) Globalstar 7	Globalstar	Intended: Low Earth	Communications	9 September	Launch Failure
9 September; 20:29	(United States) Globalstar 9	Globalstar	Intended: Low Earth	Communications	9 September	Launch Failure
9 September; 20:29	(United States) Globalstar 10	Globalstar	Intended: Low Earth	Communications	9 September	Launch Failure
9 September; 20:29	(United States) Globalstar 11	Globalstar	Intended: Low Earth	Communications	9 September	Launch Failure
9 September; 20:29	(United States) Globalstar 12	Globalstar	Intended: Low Earth	Communications	9 September	Launch Failure
9 September; 20:29	(United States) Globalstar 13	Globalstar	Intended: Low Earth	Communications	9 September	Launch Failure
9 September; 20:29	(United States) Globalstar 16	Globalstar	Intended: Low Earth	Communications	9 September	Launch Failure
9 September; 20:29	(United States) Globalstar 17	Globalstar	Intended: Low Earth	Communications	9 September	Launch Failure
9 September; 20:29	(United States) Globalstar 18	Globalstar	Intended: Low Earth	Communications	9 September	Launch Failure
9 September; 20:29	(United States) Globalstar 20	Globalstar	Intended: Low Earth	Communications	9 September	Launch Failure
9 September; 20:29	(United States) Globalstar 21	Globalstar	Intended: Low Earth	Communications	9 September	Launch Failure
9 September; 20:29	Computer error caused premature second stage cutout					
16 September; 06:31	(France) Ariane 4 44LP		(France) Kourou ELA-2		(France) Arianespace	
16 September; 06:31	(United States) PanAmSat 7	PanAmSat	Geosynchronous	Communications	In orbit	Operational
23 September; 05:06	(United States) Pegasus-XL/HAPS		(United States) Stargazer, Wallops Island		(United States) Orbital Sciences	
23 September; 05:06	(United States) Orbcomm C1	Orbcomm	Low Earth	Communications	In orbit	Operational
23 September; 05:06	(United States) Orbcomm C2	Orbcomm	Low Earth	Communications	In orbit	Operational
23 September; 05:06	(United States) Orbcomm C3	Orbcomm	Low Earth	Communications	In orbit	Operational
23 September; 05:06	(United States) Orbcomm C4	Orbcomm	Low Earth	Communications	In orbit	Operational
23 September; 05:06	(United States) Orbcomm C5	Orbcomm	Low Earth	Communications	In orbit	Operational
23 September; 05:06	(United States) Orbcomm C6	Orbcomm	Low Earth	Communications	In orbit	Operational
23 September; 05:06	(United States) Orbcomm C7	Orbcomm	Low Earth	Communications	In orbit	Operational
23 September; 05:06	(United States) Orbcomm C8	Orbcomm	Low Earth	Communications	In orbit	Operational
28 September; 23:41	(Russia) Molniya-M		(Russia) Plesetsk Site 43/3		(Russia)	
28 September; 23:41	(Russia) Molniya-1T	MOM	Molniya	Communications	In orbit	Operational
=== October ===
3 October; 10:04	(United States) Taurus 1110		(United States) Vandenberg LC-576E		(United States) Orbital Sciences	
3 October; 10:04	(United States) STEX	NRO	Low Earth	Technology research	In orbit	Partial satellite failure
3 October; 10:04	(United States) USA-141 (ATeX)	NRO	Low Earth	Technology research	In orbit	Satellite failure
3 October; 10:04	ATeX failed to deploy fully and was jettisoned from STEX on 16 January 1999 to protect the main spacecraft					
5 October; 22:51	(France) Ariane 4 44L		(France) Kourou ELA-2		(France) Arianespace	
5 October; 22:51	(France) Eutelsat W2	Eutelsat	Geosynchronous	Communications	In orbit	Operational
5 October; 22:51	(Sweden) Sirius 3	NSAB	Geosynchronous	Communications	In orbit	Operational
9 October; 22:50	(United States) Atlas IIA		(United States) Cape Canaveral SLC-36B		(Russia) (United States) International Launch Services	
9 October; 22:50	(France) Hot Bird 5	Eutelsat	Geosynchronous	Communications	In orbit	Operational
20 October; 07:19	(United States) Atlas IIA		(United States) Cape Canaveral SLC-36A		(United States)	
20 October; 07:19	(United States) USA-140 (UHF F/O F9)	US Navy	Geosynchronous	Communications	In orbit	Operational
21 October; 16:37	(France) Ariane 5G		(France) Kourou ELA-3		(France) Arianespace	
21 October; 16:37	Maqsat 3	ESA	Geosynchronous transfer	Monitor rocket performance	In orbit	Successful
21 October; 16:37	ARD	ESA	Suborbital	Spacecraft recovery demonstration	21 October	Successful
21 October; 16:37	ARD recovered in Pacific Ocean by French Navy					
23 October; 00:02	(United States) Pegasus-H		(United States) Stargazer, Cape Canaveral		(United States) Orbital Sciences	
23 October; 00:02	(Brazil) SCD-2	INPE	Low Earth	Communications	In orbit	Operational
24 October; 21:13	(United States) Delta II 7326-9.5		(United States) Cape Canaveral SLC-17A		(United States) Boeing IDS	
24 October; 21:13	(United States) Deep Space 1	NASA	Heliocentric	Asteroid/Comet probe	In orbit	Successful
24 October; 21:13	(United States) SEDSAT-1	Alabama	Low Earth	Amateur radio	In orbit	Operational
24 October; 21:13	Maiden flight of Delta II 7326; Deep Space 1 performed flybys of 1992 KD and 19P/Borrelly					
25 October; 04:14	(Russia) Soyuz-U		(Kazakhstan) Baikonur Site 1/5		(Russia) Roskosmos	
25 October; 04:14	(Russia) Progress M-40	Roskosmos	Low Earth (Mir)	Logistics	5 February 1999; 11:10	Successful
25 October; 04:14	(France) (United States) (Russia) Sputnik-41	ACF/AMSAT/RuAF	Low Earth	Amateur radio	11 January 1999	Successful
25 October; 04:14	Sputnik-41 deployed from Mir during an EVA on 10 November					
28 October; 22:15	(France) Ariane 4 44L		(France) Kourou ELA-2		(France) Arianespace	
28 October; 22:15	(United States) AfriStar	1worldspace	Geosynchronous	Communications	In orbit	Operational
28 October; 22:15	(United States) GE 5	GE Americom	Geosynchronous	Communications	In orbit	Operational
29 October; 19:19	(United States) Space Shuttle Discovery		(United States) Kennedy LC-39B		(United States) United Space Alliance	
29 October; 19:19	(United States) STS-95	NASA	Low Earth	Microgravity research	7 November; 17:03	Successful
29 October; 19:19	(United States) SpaceHab Single Module	NASA/SpaceHab	Low Earth (Discovery)	Scientific research	7 November; 17:03	Successful
29 October; 19:19	(United States) SPARTAN-201	NASA	Low Earth	Solar observation	7 November; 17:03	Successful
29 October; 19:19	(United States) PANSAT (PO-34)	US Navy	Low Earth	Technology demonstration	In orbit	Operational
29 October; 19:19	Crewed orbital flight with seven astronauts including the first Spanish space traveller (Pedro Duque) and the oldest person to fly in space (John Glenn); PANSAT deployed on 30 October; SPARTAN deployed on 1 November and retrieved on 3 November					
=== November ===
4 November; 05:12	(Russia) Proton-K/DM-2M		(Kazakhstan) Baikonur Site 81/23		(Russia) (United States) International Launch services	
4 November; 05:12	(United States) PanAmSat 8	PanAmSat	Geosynchronous	Communications	In orbit	Operational
6 November; 13:37	(United States) Delta II 7920-10C		(United States) Vandenberg SLC-2W		(United States) Boeing IDS	
6 November; 13:37	(United States) Iridium 2	Iridium	Low Earth	Communications	In orbit	Spacecraft failure
6 November; 13:37	(United States) Iridium 86	Iridium	Low Earth	Communications	5 October 2018	Successful
6 November; 13:37	(United States) Iridium 85	Iridium	Low Earth	Communications	30 December 2000	Spacecraft failure
6 November; 13:37	(United States) Iridium 84	Iridium	Low Earth	Communications	4 November 2018	Successful
6 November; 13:37	(United States) Iridium 83	Iridium	Low Earth	Communications	5 November 2018	Successful
20 November; 05:12	(Russia) Proton-K		(Kazakhstan) Baikonur Site 81/23		(Russia) Roskosmos	
20 November; 05:12	(United Nations) Zarya	NASA/Roskosmos	Low Earth (ISS)	ISS module	In orbit	Operational
20 November; 05:12	First launch of the International Space Station programme					
22 November; 23:54	(United States) Delta II 7925-9.5		(United States) Cape Canaveral SLC-17B		(United States) Boeing IDS	
22 November; 23:54	(Norway) BONUM-1	Telenor	Geosynchronous	Communications	In orbit	Operational
=== December ===
4 December; 08:35	(United States) Space Shuttle Endeavour		(United States) Kennedy LC-39A		(United States) United Space Alliance	
4 December; 08:35	(United States) STS-88	NASA	Low Earth (ISS)	ISS assembly	16 December; 04:53	Successful
4 December; 08:35	(United Nations) Unity (Node 1)	NASA	Low Earth (ISS)	ISS module	In orbit	Operational
4 December; 08:35	(United Nations) PMA-1	NASA	Low Earth (ISS)	ISS component	In orbit	Operational
4 December; 08:35	(United Nations) PMA-2	NASA	Low Earth (ISS)	ISS component	In orbit	Operational
4 December; 08:35	(Argentina) SAC-A	CONAE	Low Earth	Technology demonstration	25 October 1999	Successful
4 December; 08:35	(United States) MightySat 1	US Air Force	Low Earth	Technology demonstration	21 November 1999	Successful
4 December; 08:35	Crewed orbital flight with six astronauts First crewed flight to the International Space Station; SAC-A deployed on 14 December and MightySat on 15 December					
6 December; 00:43	(France) Ariane 4 42L		(France) Kourou ELA-2		(France) Arianespace	
6 December; 00:43	(Mexico) Satmex 5	Satmex	Geosynchronous	Communications	In orbit	Operational
6 December; 00:57	(United States) Pegasus-XL		(United States) Stargazer, Vandenberg		(United States) Orbital Sciences	
6 December; 00:57	(United States) SWAS	NASA	Low Earth	Astronomy	In orbit	Operational
10 December; 11:57	(Russia) Kosmos-3M		(Russia) Plesetsk Site 132/1		(Russia)	
10 December; 11:57	(Russia) Nadezhda 5	MO RF	Low Earth	Navigation	In orbit	Operational
10 December; 11:57	(Sweden) Astrid-2	SSC	Low Earth	Aurora research	In orbit	Operational
11 December; 18:45	(United States) Delta II 7425-9.5		(United States) Cape Canaveral SLC-17A		(United States) Boeing IDS	
11 December; 18:45	(United States) Mars Climate Orbiter	NASA	Intended: Areocentric; Actual: Heliocentric	Mars orbiter	23 September 1999	Spacecraft failure
11 December; 18:45	Maiden flight of Delta II 7425; MCO crashed into Mars during orbital inserition due to error in unit conversions between Metric and Imperial					
19 December; 11:39	(China) Long March 2C		(China) Taiyuan LC-1		(China)	
19 December; 11:39	(United States) Iridium 20	Iridium	Low Earth	Communications	22 October 2018	Successful
19 December; 11:39	(United States) Iridium 11	Iridium	Low Earth	Communications	22 October 2018	Successful
22 December; 01:08	(France) Ariane 4 42L		(France) Kourou ELA-2		(France) Arianespace	
22 December; 01:08	(United States) PAS-6B	PanAmSat	Geosynchronous	Communications	In orbit	Operational
24 December; 20:02	(Russia) Kosmos-3M		(Russia) Plesetsk Site 132/1		(Russia)	
24 December; 20:02	(Russia) Kosmos 2361 (Parus)	MO RF	Low Earth	Navigation	In orbit	Operational
30 December; 18:35	(Russia) Proton-K/DM-2		(Kazakhstan) Baikonur Site 200/39		(Russia)	
30 December; 18:35	(Russia) Kosmos 2362 (GLONASS)	MOM	Medium Earth	Navigation	In orbit	Operational
30 December; 18:35	(Russia) Kosmos 2363 (GLONASS)	MOM	Medium Earth	Navigation	In orbit	Operational
30 December; 18:35	(Russia) Kosmos 2364 (GLONASS)	MOM	Medium Earth	Navigation	In orbit	Operational

- ← Jan
- Feb
- Mar
- Apr
- May
- Jun
- Jul
- Aug
- Sep
- Oct
- Nov
- Dec →

== Suborbital launches ==
- ← Jan
- Feb
- Mar
- Apr
- May
- Jun
- Jul
- Aug
- Sep
- Oct
- Nov
- Dec →

Date and time (UTC)	Rocket	Flight number	Launch site		LSP	
Date and time (UTC)	Payload (⚀ = CubeSat)	Operator	Orbit	Function	Decay (UTC)	Outcome
Date and time (UTC)	Remarks					
=== January ===
16 January; 03:25	(United States) Minuteman II		(United States) Vandenberg LF-03		(United States) US Air Force	
16 January; 03:25	(United States) MSLS IFT-2	US Air Force	Suborbital	ABM target	16 January	Successful
16 January; 03:46	(United States) Payload Launch Vehicle		(Marshall Islands) Meck Island		(United States) US Air Force/Orbital Sciences	
16 January; 03:46	(United States) EKV	US Air Force	Suborbital	ABM interceptor	16 January	Successful
25 January; 08:35	(Japan) S-310		(Japan) Uchinoura Pad K		(Japan) ISAS	
25 January; 08:35	(Japan) SEEK	ISAS	Suborbital	Ozone/Aeronomy research	25 January	Successful
26 January; 12:26	(United States) Nike Orion		(Sweden) Esrange		(Sweden) SSC	
26 January; 12:26	(Sweden) (Germany) MERMAID	SSC/DLR	Suborbital	Microgravity research	26 January	Successful
31 January; 04:30	(Japan) S-520		(Japan) Uchinoura Pad K		(Japan) ISAS	
31 January; 04:30	(Japan) XUV Doppler Telescope	ISAS	Suborbital	Solar observation	31 January	Successful
31 January; 23:43	(Brazil) VS-30		(Norway) Andøya		(Brazil) INPE	
31 January; 23:43	(Germany) AL-VS30-229	DLR	Suborbital	Aeronomy research	31 January	Successful
=== February ===
5 February; 08:30	(Japan) S-520		(Japan) Uchinoura Pad K		(Japan) ISAS	
5 February; 08:30		ISAS	Suborbital	Plasma research	5 February	Successful
7 February; 07:40	(United Kingdom) Skylark VII		(Sweden) Esrange Pad S		(Sweden) SSC	
7 February; 07:40	(Sweden) TEXUS 36	SSC	Suborbital	Microgravity research	7 February	Successful
10 February	(United States) Trident C-4		(United States) Submarine, Eastern Range		(United States) US Navy	
10 February		US Navy	Suborbital	Missile test	10 February	Successful
10 February	(United States) Trident C-4		(United States) Submarine, Eastern Range		(United States) US Navy	
10 February		US Navy	Suborbital	Missile test	10 February	Successful
10 February	(United States) Trident C-4		(United States) Submarine, Eastern Range		(United States) US Navy	
10 February		US Navy	Suborbital	Missile test	10 February	Successful
10 February	(United States) Trident C-4		(United States) Submarine, Eastern Range		(United States) US Navy	
10 February		US Navy	Suborbital	Missile test	10 February	Successful
11 February; 09:42	(United States) Nike-Orion		(Sweden) Esrange		(Germany) DLR	
11 February; 09:42	(Germany) Texus-5	DLR	Suborbital	Microgravity research	11 February	Successful
19 February	(Russia) R-29		(Russia) Submarine, Barents Sea		(Russia) Russian Navy	
19 February		Russian Navy	Suborbital	Missile test	19 February	Successful
19 February	(Russia) R-29		(Russia) Submarine, Barents Sea		(Russia) Russian Navy	
19 February		Russian Navy	Suborbital	Missile test	19 February	Successful
20 February; 00:09	(Canada) Black Brant VC		(Puerto Rico) Arecibo		(United States) NASA	
20 February; 00:09	(United States) Coqui Dos SAL	NASA	Suborbital	Ionosphere research	20 February	Successful
20 February; 00:37	(Canada) Black Brant VC		(Puerto Rico) Arecibo		(United States) NASA	
20 February; 00:37	(United States) Coqui Dos	NASA	Suborbital	Ionosphere research	20 February	Successful
20 February; 08:23	(United States) Minuteman III		(United States) Vandenberg LF-04		(United States) US Air Force	
20 February; 08:23	(United States) FOT GT166GM	US Air Force	Suborbital	Missile test	20 February	Failure
25 February; 03:17	(Canada) Black Brant VC		(Puerto Rico) Arecibo		(United States) NASA	
25 February; 03:17	(United States) Coqui Dos	NASA	Suborbital	Ionosphere research	25 February	Successful
25 February; 07:43	(United States) Taurus-Orion		(Puerto Rico) Arecibo		(United States) NASA	
25 February; 07:43		NASA	Suborbital	Ionosphere research	25 February	Successful
25 February; 07:50	(United States) Terrier-Orion		(Puerto Rico) Arecibo		(United States) NASA	
25 February; 07:50	(United States) EDDY	NASA	Suborbital	Ionosphere research	25 February	Successful
=== March ===
3 March; 22:33	(United States) Nike-Orion		(Sweden) Esrange		(Sweden) SSC	
3 March; 22:33	(Sweden) NLTE-1 Atomic 2A	SSC	Suborbital	Ionosphere research	3 March	Successful
6 March; 21:26	(United States) Nike-Orion		(Sweden) Esrange		(Sweden) SSC	
6 March; 21:26	(Sweden) NLTE-2 Atomic 2B	SSC	Suborbital	Ionosphere research	3 March	Successful
7 March; 01:33	(Canada) Black Brant VC		(Puerto Rico) Arecibo		(United States) NASA	
7 March; 01:33	(United States) Coqui Dos	NASA	Suborbital	Ionosphere research	7 March	Successful
7 March	(United States) Trident D-5		(United States) Submarine, Eastern Range		(United States) US Navy	
7 March		US Navy	Suborbital	Missile test	7 March	Successful
7 March	(United States) Trident D-5		(United States) Submarine, Eastern Range		(United States) US Navy	
7 March		US Navy	Suborbital	Missile test	7 March	Successful
10 March	(United States) Trident D-5		(United States) Submarine, Eastern Range		(United States) US Navy	
10 March		US Navy	Suborbital	Missile test	10 March	Successful
10 March	(United States) Trident D-5		(United States) Submarine, Eastern Range		(United States) US Navy	
10 March		US Navy	Suborbital	Missile test	10 March	Successful
11 March; 23:39	(Canada) Black Brant IX		(Puerto Rico) Arecibo		(United States) NASA	
11 March; 23:39	(United States) Coqui Dos LaTuR	NASA	Suborbital	Ionosphere research	11 March	Successful
21 March	(Brazil) VS-40		(Brazil) Alcântara		(Brazil) INPE	
21 March		INPE	Suborbital	Test sounding rocket	21 March	Successful
25 March; 01:45	(Canada) Black Brant VC		(Puerto Rico) Arecibo		(United States) NASA	
25 March; 01:45	(United States) Coqui Dos	NASA	Suborbital	Ionosphere research	25 March	Successful
=== April ===
6 April	(Pakistan) Ghauri		(Pakistan) Tilla		(Pakistan) PAF	
6 April		PAF	Suborbital	Missile test	6 April	Successful
6 April	Maiden flight of Ghauri					
6 April	(India) RH-560/200 MK II		(India) Sriharikota		(India) ISRO	
6 April		ISRO	Suborbital	Aeronomy research	6 April	Successful
15 April	(Ukraine) R-36M2		(Kazakhstan) Baikonur		(Russia) RVSN	
15 April		RVSN/ISC Kosmotras	Suborbital	Missile test	15 April	Successful
15 April	Part of Dnepr development programme					
17 April; 18:05	(United States) Strypi		(United States) Pacific Missile Range		(United States) Sandia	
17 April; 18:05	(United States) Red Crow	BMDO	Suborbital	Technology development	17 April	Successful
18 April; 04:00	(Canada) Black Brant IX		(United States) White Sands		(United States) NASA	
18 April; 04:00		NASA	Suborbital	Ultraviolet astronomy	18 April	Successful
18 April; 07:30	(Canada) Black Brant IX		(United States) White Sands		(United States) NASA	
18 April; 07:30		NASA	Suborbital	Ultraviolet astronomy	18 April	Successful
28 April; 12:10	(Canada) Black Brant IXB		SpacePort Canada		(Canada) Akjuit Aerospace	
28 April; 12:10	(Canada) ACTIVE	CSA	Suborbital	Ionosphere research	28 April	Successful
28 April; 12:10	First and only launch conducted by Akjuit Aerospace. Final launch from the SpacePort Canada (Churchill Rocket Research Range) site.					
=== May ===
7 May; 10:30	(United States) Peacekeeper		(United States) Vandenberg LF-05		(United States) US Air Force	
7 May; 10:30		US Air Force	Suborbital	Missile test	7 May	Successful
12 May; 11:22	(United States) Hera		(United States) White Sands LC-94		(United States) US Air Force	
12 May; 11:22		US Air Force	Suborbital	ABM Target	12 May	Successful
12 May; 11:25	(United States) THAAD		(United States) White Sands		(United States) US Air Force	
12 May; 11:25		US Air Force	Suborbital	ABM Interceptor	12 May	Failure
22 May; 06:22	(Canada) Black Brant IX		(United States) White Sands		(United States) NASA	
22 May; 06:22	(United States) NITE	NASA	Suborbital	Infrared astronomy	22 May	Successful
=== June ===
3 June; 19:57	(United States) Minuteman III		(United States) Vandenberg LF-26		(United States) US Air Force	
3 June; 19:57	(United States) FOT GT167GB	US Air Force	Suborbital	Missile test	3 June	Successful
11 June; 01:00	(South Korea) KSR-II		(South Korea) Anhueng		(South Korea) KARI	
11 June; 01:00		KARI	Suborbital	Ionosphere research X-ray astronomy	11 June	Successful
16 June; 14:19	(United States) Nike-Orion		(United States) Wallops Island		(United States) NASA	
16 June; 14:19		NASA	Suborbital	Test sounding rocket	16 June	Successful
24 June; 08:01	(United States) Minuteman III		(United States) Vandenberg LF-09		(United States) US Air Force	
24 June; 08:01	(United States) GRP-IDF-1	US Air Force	Suborbital	Missile test	24 June	Successful
24 June; 12:46	(United States) Minuteman III		(United States) Vandenberg LF-10		(United States) US Air Force	
24 June; 12:46	(United States) FOT GT168GM	US Air Force	Suborbital	Missile test	24 June	Successful
=== July ===
22 July	(Iran) Shahab-3		(Iran) Emamshahr		(Iran)	
22 July			Suborbital	Missile test	22 July	Failure
22 July	Maiden flight of Shahab-3					
=== August ===
15 August; 05:30	(Canada) Black Brant IX		(United States) White Sands		(United States) NASA	
15 August; 05:30	(United States) EEV CCD	NASA	Suborbital	X-ray astronomy	15 August	Successful
21 August	(Russia) R-29		(Russia) Submarine, Barents Sea		(Russia) Russian Navy	
21 August		Russian Navy	Suborbital	Missile test	21 August	Successful
=== September ===
16 September; 11:10	(Russia) Topol		(Russia) Plesetsk Site 158		(Russia) RVSN	
16 September; 11:10		RVSN	Suborbital	Missile test	16 September	Successful
18 September; 08:01	(United States) Minuteman III		(United States) Vandenberg LF-26		(United States) US Air Force	
18 September; 08:01	(United States) GRP-IDF-2	US Air Force	Suborbital	Missile test	18 September	Successful
18 September; 15:00	(Canada) Black Brant IX		(United States) White Sands		(United States) NASA	
18 September; 15:00	(United States) SOAREX-1	NASA	Suborbital	Hypersonic dynamics test	18 September	Successful
21 September; 14:51	(India) RH-560/300 MK II		(India) Sriharikota		(India) ISRO	
21 September; 14:51	(India) (Germany) DEOS F06	ISRO/DLR	Suborbital	Ionosphere research	21 September	Successful
24 September; 12:50	(United States) Storm-2		(United States) White Sands LC-32		(United States) Orbital Sciences	
24 September; 12:50	(United States) MTTV	US Air Force	Suborbital	Target	24 September	Successful
24 September; 12:50	(United States) MTD-3	US Air Force	Suborbital	Weapons test	24 September	Successful
28 September; 15:11	(India) RH-560/300 MK II		(India) Sriharikota		(India) ISRO	
28 September; 15:11	(India) (Germany) DEOS F07	ISRO/DLR	Suborbital	Ionosphere research	28 September	Successful
=== October ===
7 October; 12:00	(Russia) UR-100NU		(Kazakhstan) Baikonur		(Russia) RVSN	
7 October; 12:00		RVSN	Suborbital	Missile test	7 October	Successful
22 October; 12:53	(Russia) Topol		(Russia) Plesetsk Site 158		(Russia) RVSN	
22 October; 12:53		RVSN	Suborbital	Missile test	22 October	Failure
22 October; 12:53	Self-destruct activated after rocket went off course					
=== November ===
2 November; 18:20	(Canada) Black Brant IX		(United States) White Sands		(United States) NASA	
2 November; 18:20	(United States) SOPHIE (NCAR/CU-7)	NASA	Suborbital	Ultraviolet solar observation	2 November	Successful
6 November; 01:32	(United States) AIT-1		(United States) Kodiak Island		(United States) Orbital Sciences	
6 November; 01:32		US Air Force	Suborbital	Rocket test	6 November	Successful
6 November; 01:32	First launch from Kodiak Island					
18 November; 15:40	(Canada) Black Brant IX		(United States) White Sands		(United States) NASA	
18 November; 15:40		NASA	Suborbital	Microgravity research	18 November	Successful
18 November; 23:00	(Japan) TR-1		(Japan) Tanegashima LA-T		(Japan) NASDA	
18 November; 23:00		NASDA	Suborbital	Microgravity research	18 November	Successful
20 November	(United States) Aries		(United States) Pacific Missile Range		(United States) US Air Force	
20 November	(United States) TTV-1	US Air Force	Suborbital	Target vehicle	20 November	Successful
24 November; 09:53	(France) Maxus		(Sweden) Esrange		(Sweden) SSC	
24 November; 09:53		ESA	Suborbital	Scientific research	24 November	Successful
=== December ===
3 December; 11:04	(United States) Nike-Orion		(Sweden) Esrange		(Germany) DLR	
3 December; 11:04	(Germany) Mini-Texus 6	DLR	Suborbital	Microgravity research	3 December	Successful
8 December; 11:25	(Russia) Topol		(Russia) Plesetsk Site 158		(Russia) RVSN	
8 December; 11:25		RVSN	Suborbital	Missile test	8 December	Successful
9 December; 10:20	(Russia) RT-23		(Russia) Plesetsk		(Russia) RVSN	
9 December; 10:20		RVSN	Suborbital	Test flight	9 December	Successful
10 December	(Russia) UR-100NU		(Kazakhstan) Baikonur		(Russia) RVSN	
10 December		RVSN	Suborbital	Missile test	10 December	Successful
15 December	Taiwan Sounding Rocket	Sounding Rocket I	(Taiwan) Jiu Peng Air Base		(Taiwan) NSPO	
15 December		NSPO	Suborbital	Test flight	15 December	Successful
15 December	Apogee: ~280 km (174 mi)					

- ← Jan
- Feb
- Mar
- Apr
- May
- Jun
- Jul
- Aug
- Sep
- Oct
- Nov
- Dec →

== Deep-space rendezvous ==
Date (GMT)	Spacecraft	Event	Remarks
11 January	Lunar Prospector	Selenocentric orbit injection	
23 January	NEAR	Flyby of the Earth	Closest approach: 540 kilometres (340 mi)
10 February	Galileo	5th flyby of Europa	
29 March	Galileo	6th flyby of Europa	
26 April	Cassini	1st flyby of Venus	Gravity assist
13 May	AsiaSat 3/HGS 1 comsat	1st flyby of the Moon	First use of moon's gravity for a recovery mission; Closest approach: 6,200 kilometres (3,900 mi)
31 May	Galileo	7th flyby of Europa	
1 June	AsiaSat 3/HGS 1	2nd flyby of the Moon	Closest approach: 34,300 kilometres (21,300 mi)
21 July	Galileo	8th flyby of Europa	
26 September	Galileo	9th flyby of Europa	
22 November	Galileo	10th flyby of Europa	
20 December	Nozomi	1st flyby of the Earth	
23 December	NEAR	Flyby of 433 Eros	Closest approach: 3,827 kilometres (2,378 mi)

== EVAs ==
Start date/time	Duration	End time	Spacecraft	Crew	Function	Remarks
8 January; 23:08	3 hours 6 minutes	9 January; 02:14	Mir EO-24	(Russia) Anatoly Solovyev (Russia) Pavel Vinogradov	Repaired the damaged airlock sealing system, used the Strela boom to move across Mir and recover an American optical monitoring experiment. Checked the integrity of cable connects to several antennas.	
14 January; 21:12	3 hours 52 minutes	15 January; 01:04	Mir EO-24	(Russia) Anatoly Solovyev (United States) David Wolf	Continued to make more repairs to the airlock hatch on Kvant-2 and used a handheld photo-reflectometer to inspect the exterior surface of the station.	
1 April; 13:35	6 hours 40 minutes	20:15	Mir EO-25	(Russia) Talgat Musabayev (Russia) Nikolai Budarin	Installed a set of handrails and one of two-foot restraints on the outside of the Spektr module in preparation for the repair of the damaged solar array.	
6 April; 13:35	4 hours 15 minutes	17:50	Mir EO-25	(Russia) Talgat Musabayev (Russia) Nikolai Budarin	Begin repair of the damaged Spektr solar panel. After installing a splint on the frayed panel, the spacewalkers had to quickly return to the airlock to handle a problem with station attitude control.	
11 April; 09:55	6 Hours; 25 minutes	16:20	Mir EO-25	(Russia) Talgat Musabayev (Russia) Nikolai Budarin	Jettisoned the external thruster engine (VDU) that had been located at the top of the Sofora boom and recover an experiment from the Rapana structure.	Dismantling of the Rapana structure was not completed.
17 April; 07:40	6 Hours; 33 minutes	14:13	Mir EO-25	(Russia) Talgat Musabayev (Russia) Nikolai Budarin	Removed two structures and secured them to exterior surfaces and repositioned the new thrust engine (VDU) for future use.	
22 April; 05:34	6 Hours; 21 minutes	11:55	Mir EO-25	(Russia) Talgat Musabayev (Russia) Nikolai Budarin	Completed installation of the new VDU thruster unit on top of the Sofora boom.	
15 September; 20:00	30 minutes	20:30	Mir EO-26	(Russia) Gennady Padalka (Russia) Sergei Avdeyev	Internal spacewalk in the depressurised Spektr module to connect electrical and control cables to the solar array servo motor.	
10 November; 19:24	5 hours 54 minutes	11 November; 01:18	Mir EO-26	(Russia) Gennady Padalka (Russia) Sergei Avdeyev	Deployed Sputnik-41, deployed a French "meteorite trap" intended to catch some dust from the upcoming Leonids meteor shower.	
7 December; 22:10	7 hours 21 minutes	8 December; 05:31	STS-88; ISS Endeavour	(United States) Jerry L. Ross (United States) James H. Newman	Connected computer and electrical cables between the Unity node, the two mating adapters attached to either end of Unity, and the Zarya Functional Cargo Block (FGB).	First ISS assembly EVA
9 December; 20:33	7 hours 2 minutes	10 December; 03:35	STS-88; ISS Endeavour	(United States) Jerry L. Ross (United States) James H. Newman	Installed two box-like antennas on the outside of the Unity module that are part of the S-band early communications system.	
12 December; 20:33	6 hours 59 minutes	13 December; 03:32	STS-88; ISS Endeavour	(United States) Jerry L. Ross (United States) James H. Newman	Checked on an insulation cover on a cable connection on the lower Pressurized Mating Adapter (PMA-2) to make sure it was fully installed, attached EVA tools on the side of Unity's upper mating adapter (PMA-1) in preparation for future EVAs, and inspected Orbiter Space Vision System targets on Unity.	
