= Dolmatov =

Dolmatov (masculine, Russian: Долматов) or Dolmatova (feminine, Russian: Долматова) is a Russian surname. Notable people with the surname include:

- Anatoly Dolmatov (1951–2026), Russian politician
- Ilya Dolmatov (born 1985), Russian footballer
- Oleg Dolmatov (born 1948), Russian football player and manager
- Sergei Dolmatov (footballer) (born 1980), Russian footballer
- Sergey Dolmatov (born 1959), Russian chess grandmaster
