= RS-56 =

American kerolox rocket engine

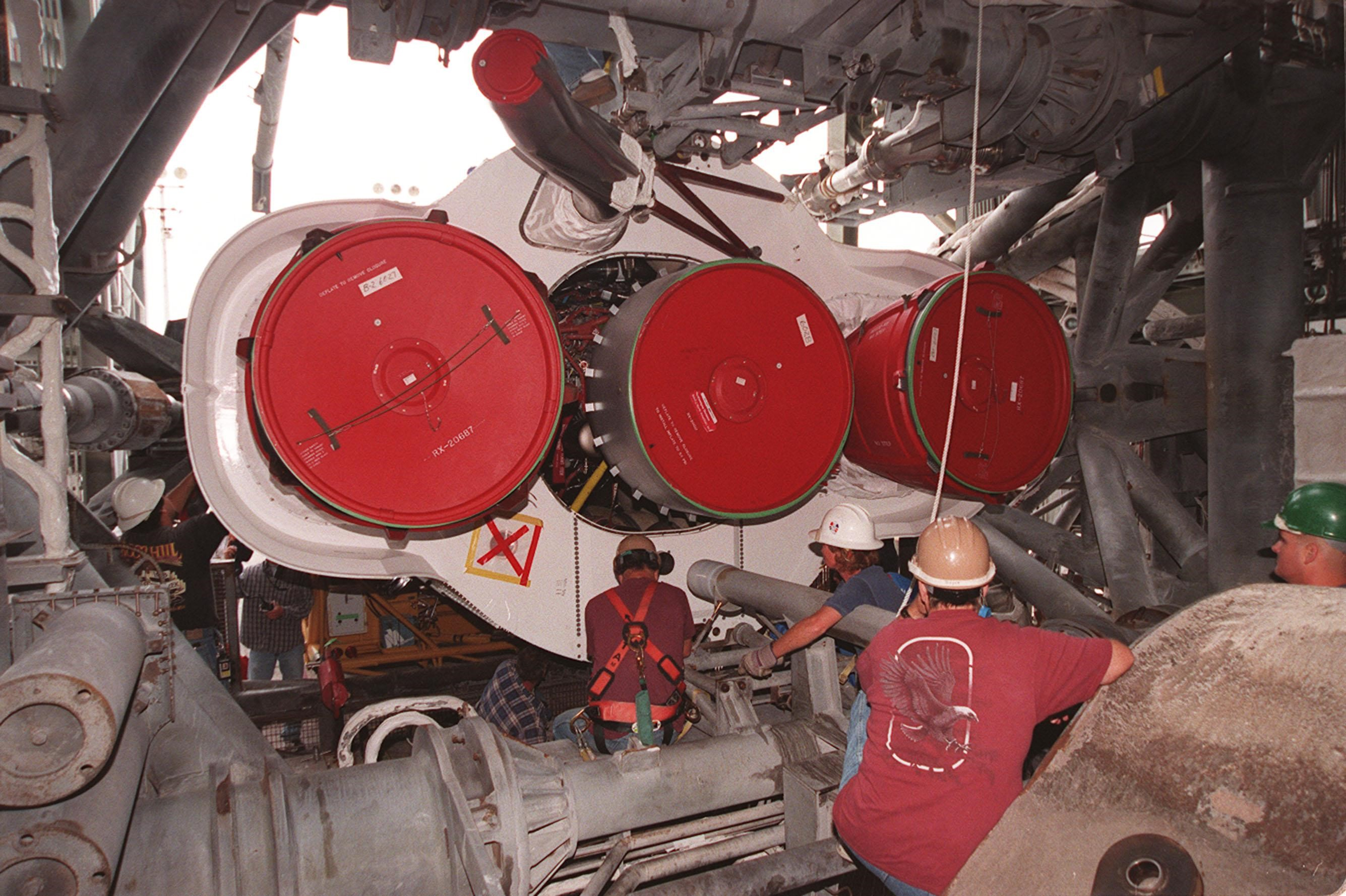
- RS-56 engines on an Atlas II
- Country of origin: United States
- First flight: 1991
- Manufacturer: Rocketdyne
- Predecessor: RS-27A
- Status: Retired

Liquid-fuel engine
- Propellant: LOX / RP-1
- Cycle: Gas-generator

Performance
- Thrust, sea-level: RS-56-OBA: 207,000 lbf (920.8 kN); RS-56-OSA: 60,500 lbf (269.0 kN)
- Chamber pressure: 4.8 MPa (48 bar)
- Specific impulse, vacuum: RS-56-OBA: 299 s (2.93 km/s); RS-56-OSA: 316 s (3.10 km/s)
- Specific impulse, sea-level: RS-56-OBA: 263 s (2.58 km/s); RS-56-OSA: 220 s (2.2 km/s)
- Burn time: RS-56-OBA: 172; RS-56-OSA: 283 sec

Dimensions
- Length: RS-56-OBA: 11.3 ft (3.43 m); 8.9 ft (2.7 m)
- Diameter: RS-56-OBA: 8.0 ft (2.45 m); 10.0 ft (3.05 m)

Used in
- Atlas II

RS-56 (Rocket System-56) was an American liquid-fueled rocket engine, developed by Rocketdyne. RS-56 was derived from the RS-27 engine, which itself is derived from the H-1 engine used in the Saturn I and Saturn IB.

Two variants of this engine were built, both for use on the Atlas II first stage. This was the last Atlas rocket to use the "stage-and-a-half" technique, where it ignited all three engines at liftoff and then jettisoned the two side engines and their support structure during ascent.

The two RS-56-OBA engines, with high thrust but moderate efficiency, were integrated into a single unit called the MA-5A and shared a common gas generator. They burned for approximately 164 seconds before being jettisoned, when acceleration reached approximately 5.0–5.5 g.

The central sustainer engine on the first stage, an RS-56-OSA, would burn for an additional 125 seconds. It featured less thrust but better efficiency at high altitudes than the RS-56-OBAs.
