= Integrated Apogee Boost Stage =

American rocket stage

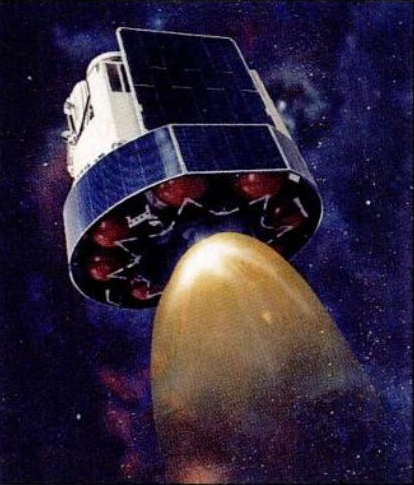
- Illustration of IABS carrying its payload, a DSCS III satellite, to geostationary orbit.
- Manufacturer: GE Astro Space
- Country of origin: United States
- Used on: Atlas II, Atlas IIA, Delta IV Medium

General characteristics
- Height: 0.68 m
- Diameter: 2.9 m
- Gross mass: 1578 kg
- Propellant mass: 1303 kg
- Empty mass: 275 kg

Launch history
- Status: Retired
- Total launches: 10
- Successes (stage only): 9
- Failed: 1 (payload reached final orbit on its own)
- First flight: Feb 11, 1992
- Last flight: Aug 29, 2003

Integrated Apogee Boost Stage
- Powered by: 2 R-4D
- Maximum thrust: 980 N
- Specific impulse: 312 s
- Propellant: NTO/MMH

The Integrated Apogee Boost Stage (IABS - alternately, Integrated Apogee Boost Subsystem) was an American rocket stage used for the launch of Defense Satellite Communications System III satellites to geostationary orbit when using a launch vehicle without an upper stage capable of delivering them there directly. Earlier DSCS III satellites had launched on the Titan 34D (using the Transtage or Inertial Upper Stage) and Space Shuttle Atlantis (using the Inertial Upper Stage), which were capable of delivering them directly to geostationary orbit - as such, the satellites were not capable of moving from geostationary transfer orbit to geostationary orbit themselves. Because of this, launch of these satellites on the Atlas II and Delta IV families required an apogee kick stage - the IABS - to be added to the satellite. The IABS was developed by GE Astro Space, who also manufactured the DSCS III satellites it was designed for.

== Design ==
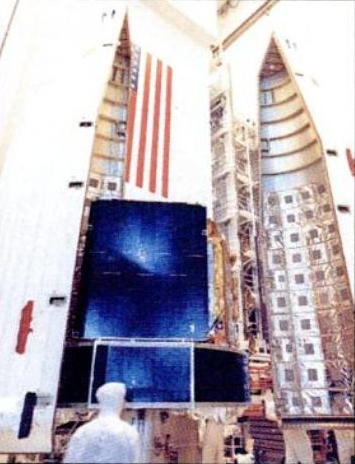
A DSCS III satellite is integrated onto the IABS, between the fairing halves of its Atlas II launch vehicle

IABS consisted of a flat, disc-shaped stage powered by two pressure-fed R-4D rocket engines, fed from a ring of spherical composite overwrapped pressure vessels containing nitrogen tetroxide and monomethylhydrazine propellants. The stage was spin-stabilized, rotating at 20 rpm. An onboard solar array around its ring-shaped exterior, separate from that of its payload satellite, allowed IABS to remain operational for up to 12 days, granting flexibility in mission planning. IABS was originally intended to make two burns while delivering DSCS III satellites - however, fuel feed problems after the first burn of its first mission rendered the second burn impossible, requiring the payload to maneuver to its final orbit on its own using its reaction control system. On later flights, these two burns were combined, avoiding this problem.

== Flights ==
Flights of the Integrated Apogee Boost Stage
IABS Designation	Date	Payload	Launch Vehicle	Launch site	Outcome
IABS-01	Feb 11, 1992	DSCS III B14	Atlas II	LC 36A	Partial Failure
IABS-02	Jul 2, 1992	DSCS III B12	Atlas II	LC 36A	Success
IABS-03	Jul 19, 1993	DSCS III B9	Atlas II	LC 36A	Success
IABS-04	Nov 28, 1993	DSCS III B10	Atlas II	LC 36A	Success
IABS-05	Jul 31, 1995	DSCS III B7	Atlas IIA	LC 36A	Success
IABS-06	Oct 25, 1997	DSCS III B13	Atlas IIA	LC 36A	Success
IABS-09	Jan 21, 2000	DSCS III B8	Atlas IIA	LC 36A	Success
IABS-08	Oct 20, 2000	DSCS III B11	Atlas IIA	LC 36A	Success
IABS-10	Mar 11, 2003	DSCS III A3	Delta IV Medium	LC 37B	Success
IABS-07	Aug 29, 2003	DSCS III B6	Delta IV Medium	LC 37B	Success

== See also ==
- Transtage
- Inertial Upper Stage
- Transfer Orbit Stage
