= Ilya Dolmatov =

Russian footballer

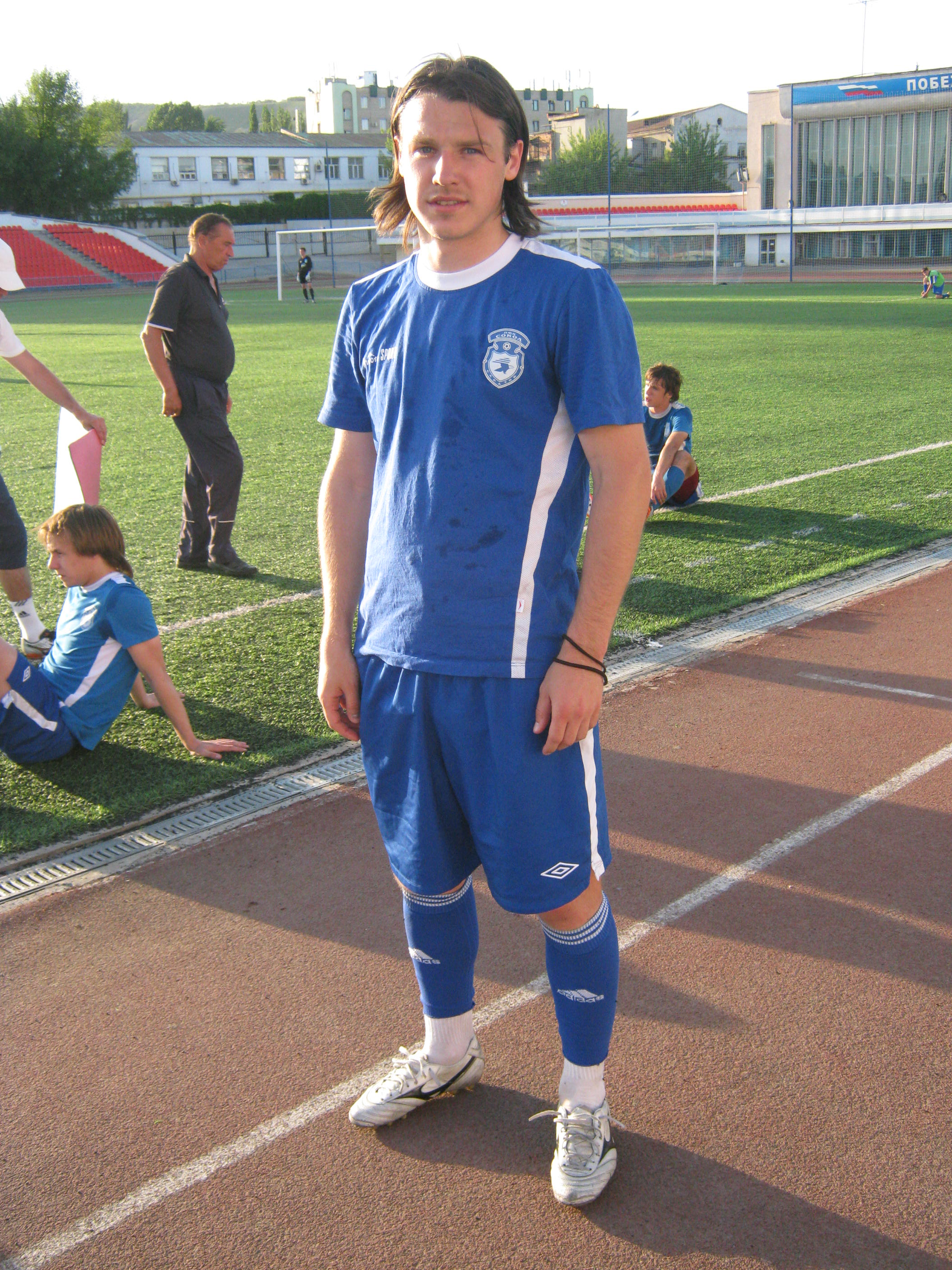

Personal information
- Full name: Ilya Alekseyevich Dolmatov
- Date of birth: 23 June 1985 (age 41)
- Place of birth: Moscow, Russian SFSR
- Height: 1.83 m (6 ft 0 in)
- Position: Forward

Youth career
- SDYuShOR-44 Krasnogvardeyets Moscow
- FC Spartak Moscow
- FC Spartak-2 Moscow

Senior career*
Years	Team	Apps	(Gls)
2002–2005	FC Sportakademklub Moscow	78	(18)
2005	FC Shinnik Yaroslavl	3	(0)
2006	FC Sibir Novosibirsk	19	(1)
2007	FC Nika Moscow	20	(8)
2008	FC Kuban Krasnodar	16	(3)
2008	FC Krasnodar	9	(1)
2009	FC Kuban Krasnodar	2	(0)
2010	FC Dolgiye Prudy Dolgoprudny (amateur)		
2011	FC Istra	29	(10)
2012	FC Sokol Saratov	9	(3)
2013	FC Kolomna-2		
2013	FC Tosno	14	(3)
- * Club domestic league appearances and goals

Ilya Alekseyevich Dolmatov (Russian: Илья Алексеевич Долматов; born 23 June 1985) is a former Russian professional footballer.

== Club career ==
He made his professional debut in the Russian Second Division in 2002 for FC Sportakademklub Moscow.
