= Atlas II =

American rocket

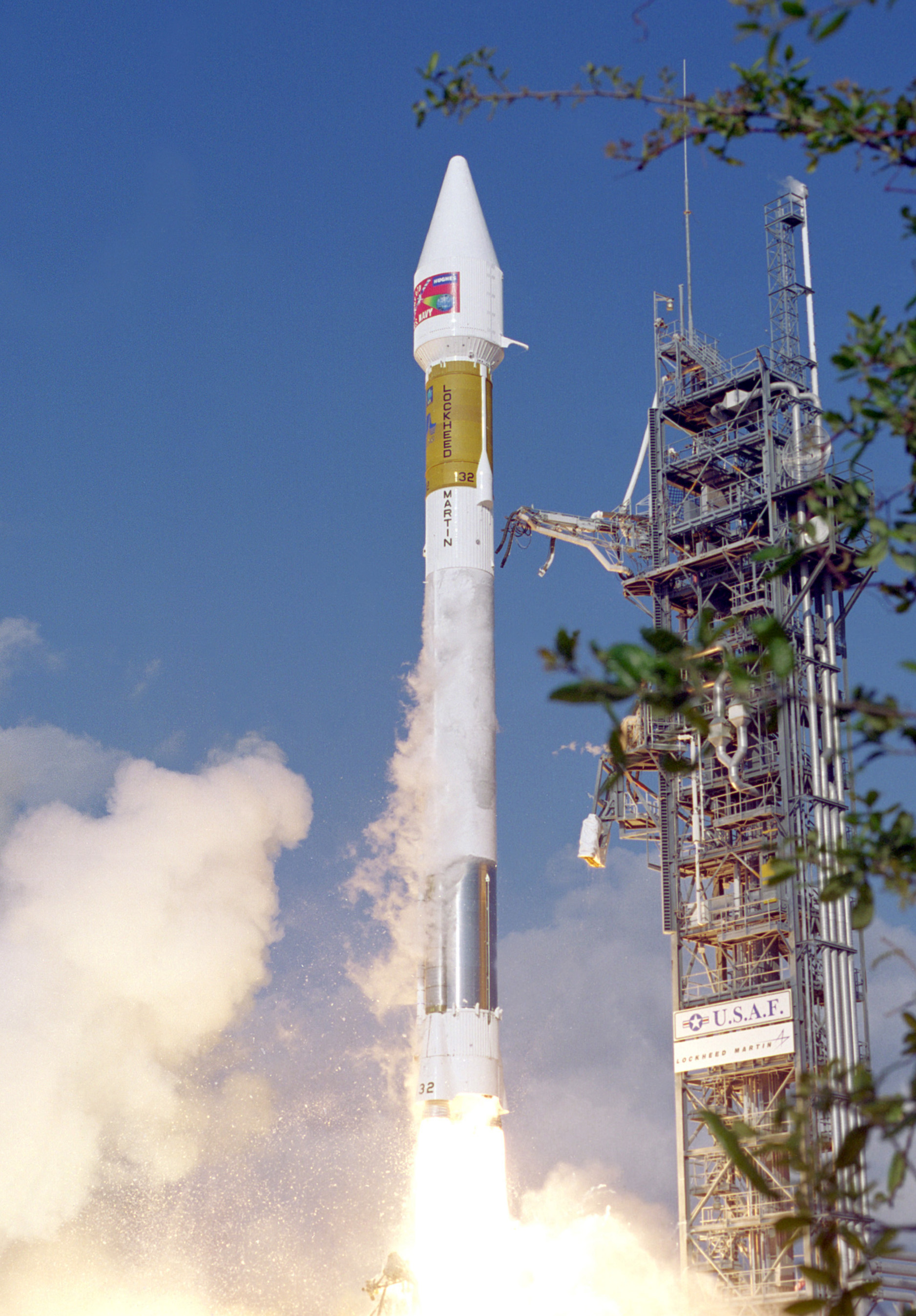
- Launch of an Atlas II rocket
- Function: Medium-lift launch vehicle
- Manufacturer: Lockheed Martin
- Country of origin: United States

Size
- Height: 47.54 m (156.0 ft)
- Diameter: 3.04 m (10.0 ft)
- Mass: 204,300 kg (450,400 lb)
- Stages: 2.5 (3.5 with IABS)

Capacity

Payload to LEO
- Mass: Atlas II: 6,580 kg (14,510 lb); Atlas IIA: 7,280 kg (16,050 lb); Atlas IIAS: 8,610 kg (18,980 lb)

Payload to GTO
- Mass: Atlas II: 2,810 kg (6,190 lb); Atlas IIA: 3,039 kg (6,700 lb); Atlas IIAS: 3,630 kg (8,000 lb)

Associated rockets
- Family: Atlas

Launch history
- Status: Retired
- Launch sites: Cape Canaveral, LC-36; Vandenberg, SLC-3
- Total launches: 63 (II: 10, IIA: 23, IIAS: 30)
- Success(es): 63
- First flight: II: December 7, 1991; IIA: June 10, 1992; IIAS: December 16, 1993
- Last flight: II: March 16, 1998; IIA: December 5, 2002; IIAS: August 31, 2004
- Carries passengers or cargo: SOHO (Atlas IIAS); TDRS (Atlas IIA)

First stage
- Powered by: 1 × RS-56-OSA
- Maximum thrust: 386 kN (87,000 lb_{f})
- Specific impulse: 316 s (3.10 km/s)
- Burn time: 283 seconds
- Propellant: RP-1 / LOX

Boosters – MA-5A
- No. boosters: 2
- Powered by: 1 × RS-56-OBA
- Total thrust: 2,093.3 kN (470,600 lb_{f})
- Specific impulse: 299 s (2.93 km/s)
- Burn time: 172 seconds
- Propellant: RP-1 / LOX

Boosters (Atlas IIAS only) – Castor 4A
- No. boosters: 4
- Maximum thrust: 433.7 kN (97,500 lb_{f})
- Total thrust: 1,734.8 kN (390,000 lb_{f})
- Specific impulse: 237.8 s (2.332 km/s)
- Burn time: 56 seconds
- Propellant: HTPB

Second stage – Centaur II
- Powered by: 2 × RL10A
- Maximum thrust: 147 kN (33,000 lb_{f})
- Specific impulse: 449 s (4.40 km/s)
- Burn time: 392 seconds
- Propellant: LH_{2} / LOX

Third stage (optional) – IABS
- Powered by: 2 × R-4D
- Maximum thrust: 980 N (220 lb_{f})
- Specific impulse: 312 s (3.06 km/s)
- Burn time: 60 seconds
- Propellant: N_{2}O_{4} / MMH

Atlas II was a member of the Atlas family of launch vehicles, which evolved from the successful Atlas missile program of the 1950s. The Atlas II was a direct evolution of the Atlas I, featuring longer first-stage tanks, higher-performing engines, and the option for strap-on solid rocket boosters. It was designed to launch payloads into low Earth orbit, geosynchronous transfer orbit or geosynchronous orbit. Sixty-three launches of the Atlas II, IIA and IIAS models were carried out between 1991 and 2004; all sixty-three launches were successes, making the Atlas II a highly reliable space launch system. The Atlas line was continued by the Atlas III, used between 2000 and 2005, and the Atlas V, which is still in use as of 2026.

== Background ==
In May 1988, the US Air Force chose General Dynamics (now Lockheed Martin) to develop the Atlas II vehicle, primarily to launch Defense Satellite Communications System payloads under the Medium Launch Vehicle II (MLV-II) program. Additional commercial and U.S. Government sales resulted in production increases leading to greater than 60 vehicles being produced and launched.

Atlas II was developed from the Atlas I and featured numerous upgrades over that vehicle.

Atlas II was launched from Launch Complex 36 at Cape Canaveral Space Force Station in Florida as well as Space Launch Complex 3E at Vandenberg Space Force Base in California. All launches were successful.

== Design ==
Atlas II provided higher performance than the earlier Atlas I by using engines with greater thrust and longer propellant tanks for both stages. The increased thrust, engine efficiency, and propellant capacity enabled the vehicle to lift payloads of 6,100 pounds (2,767 kg) into geostationary transfer orbit (GTO), or more on later Atlas II variants.

Atlas II also featured lower-cost electronics and an improved flight computer.

=== Atlas II first stage ===
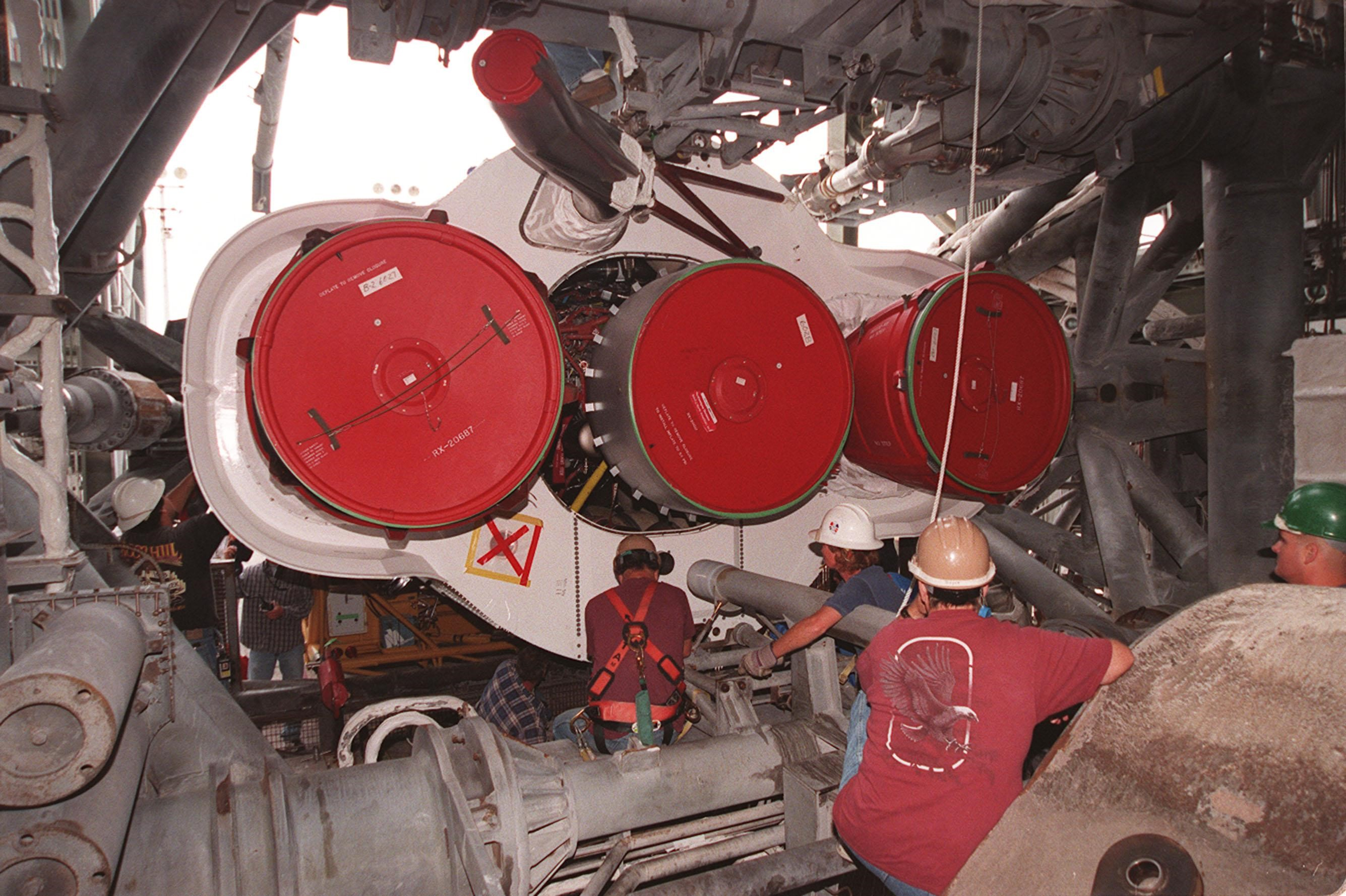
Workers at Cape Canaveral Air Force Station prepare to erect the first stage of an Atlas IIA rocket in the launch gantry on Pad 36A ahead of the GOES-L launch. Visible are the RS-56 rocket engines.

The Atlas II first stage was 3.05 m (10.0 ft) in diameter and 24.90 m (81.7 ft) long. The stage was powered by 3 RS-56 rocket engines (derived from the RS-27 main engine of the Delta II rocket) burning 156 t (344,000 lb) of RP-1 and liquid oxygen. The two booster engines were the RS-56-OBA variants (the complete assembly of both engines and the aft skirt was referred to as the MA-5A), with high thrust but moderate efficiency. The sustainer (center) engine was the RS-56-OSA variant, featuring much less thrust but higher efficiency at high altitudes than the booster engines.

The vernier engines used on the first stage of the Atlas I (and all previous Atlas models) were replaced by a hydrazine-fueled roll control system on Atlas II. This system, mounted on the interstage between the first and second stages, utilized small thrusters to control the vehicle's roll. Compared to Atlas I, the Atlas II first stage was 2.7 m (8 ft 10 in) taller.

The Atlas II was the last Atlas rocket to use the "stage-and-a-half" technique, where it ignited all 3 RS-56 engines at liftoff and then jettisoned the 2 RS-56-OBA side engines and their support structure during ascent. The two RS-56-OBA engines were integrated into a single unit called the MA-5A and shared a common gas generator. They burned for approximately 164 seconds before being jettisoned, when acceleration reached approximately 5.0–5.5 g. The central sustainer engine on the first stage, an RS-56-OSA, would burn for an additional 125 seconds after their jettison. It featured better efficiency at high altitudes than the RS-56-OBAs.

The first stage also had the option to be fitted with 4 Castor 4A solid rocket boosters as part of the IIAS version, each providing an additional 478.3 kN (107,500 lb_{f}) of thrust for 56 seconds. The first two boosters were ignited at liftoff, and the other two were ignited after the first two burnt out. Both pairs of boosters were jettisoned shortly after their respective burns.

=== Centaur II upper stage ===
The second stage of Atlas II, the Centaur II, was the result of over 3 decades of flights and enhancements of the Centaur upper stage. Centaur II featured 2 RL10A-3-3A engines, burning liquid hydrogen and liquid oxygen. It featured propellant tanks 0.9 meters longer than its predecessor, Centaur I, giving the stage more propellant and therefore higher performance. Due to the super cold propellants inside Centaur, foam insulation was installed onto the outer metal skin on the stage to help mitigate propellant boiloff inside the tank. Centaur II's foam insulation was permanently attached to the side of the stage, whereas previous versions of the stage (including Centaur I) jettisoned their insulation panels during flight.

The Centaur II upper stage (along with all other Centaur variants) used a pressure-stabilized propellant tank design and cryogenic propellants. The two stainless steel propellant tanks were separated by a common bulkhead, which helped keep mass down. Centaur II was 10.1 m (33 ft) long, carrying almost 17 t (37,000 lb) of fuel. The stage also featured 12 27 N (6.1 lbf) hydrazine thrusters to orient the stage and settle the propellants prior to engine ignition.

For the IIA and IIAS versions, Atlas used the Centaur IIA variant which featured 2 RL10A-4 engines, providing higher thrust and efficiency over the RL10A-3-3A. The two engines could be fitted with extendable nozzles, which would provide an increase in efficiency and therefore performance.

Centaur II was further refined to create the Centaur III, which flew on the Atlas III and continues to fly today on the Atlas V. Atlas II was the final Atlas rocket that only had a dual-engine Centaur available, future rockets had the option for one or two RL10 engines on Centaur. However, the Centaur V flying on the Vulcan rocket will only utilize two RL10 engines.

Centaur 2A pictures:

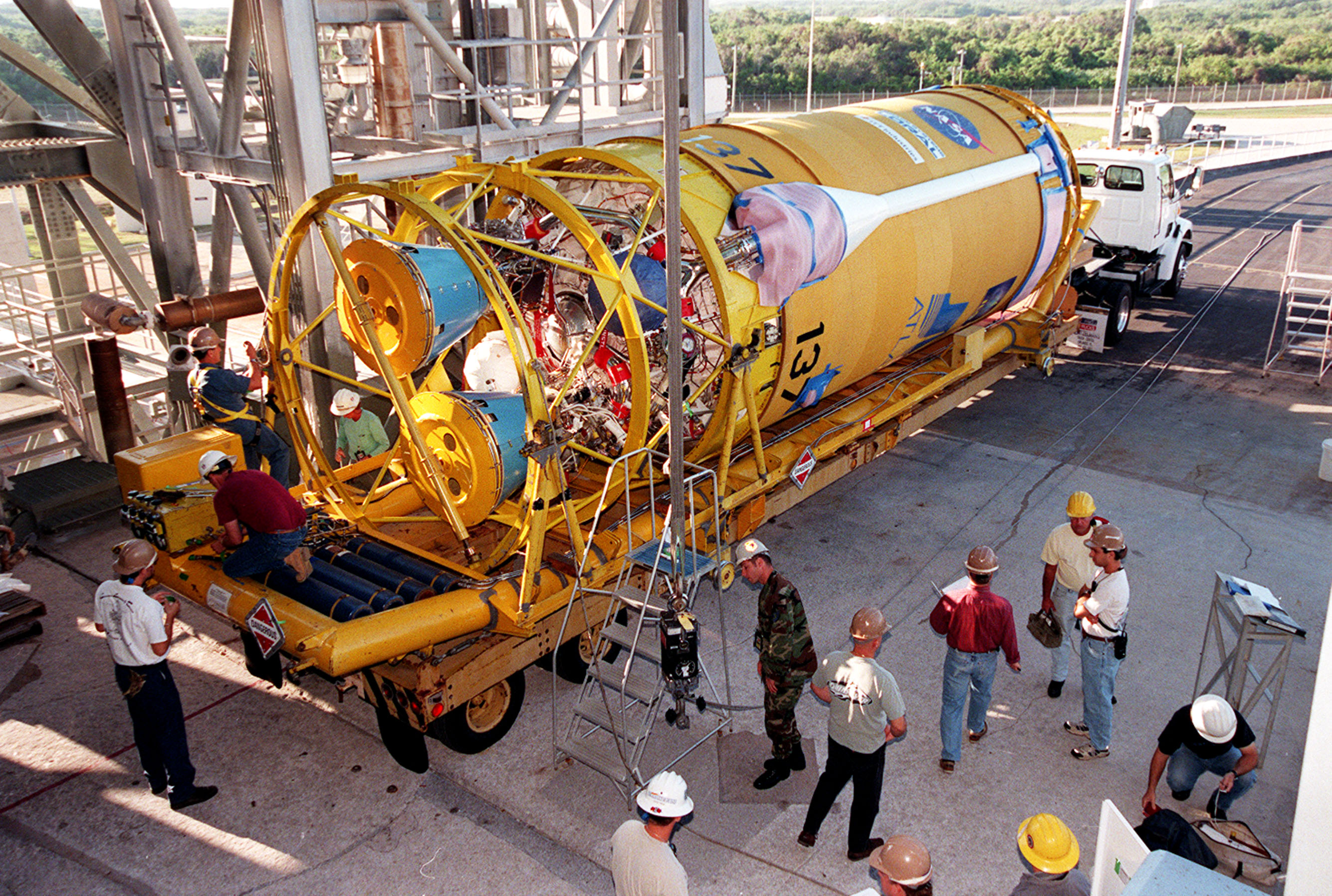
Centaur IIA arrives at Launch Complex 36A for the launch of GOES-L.

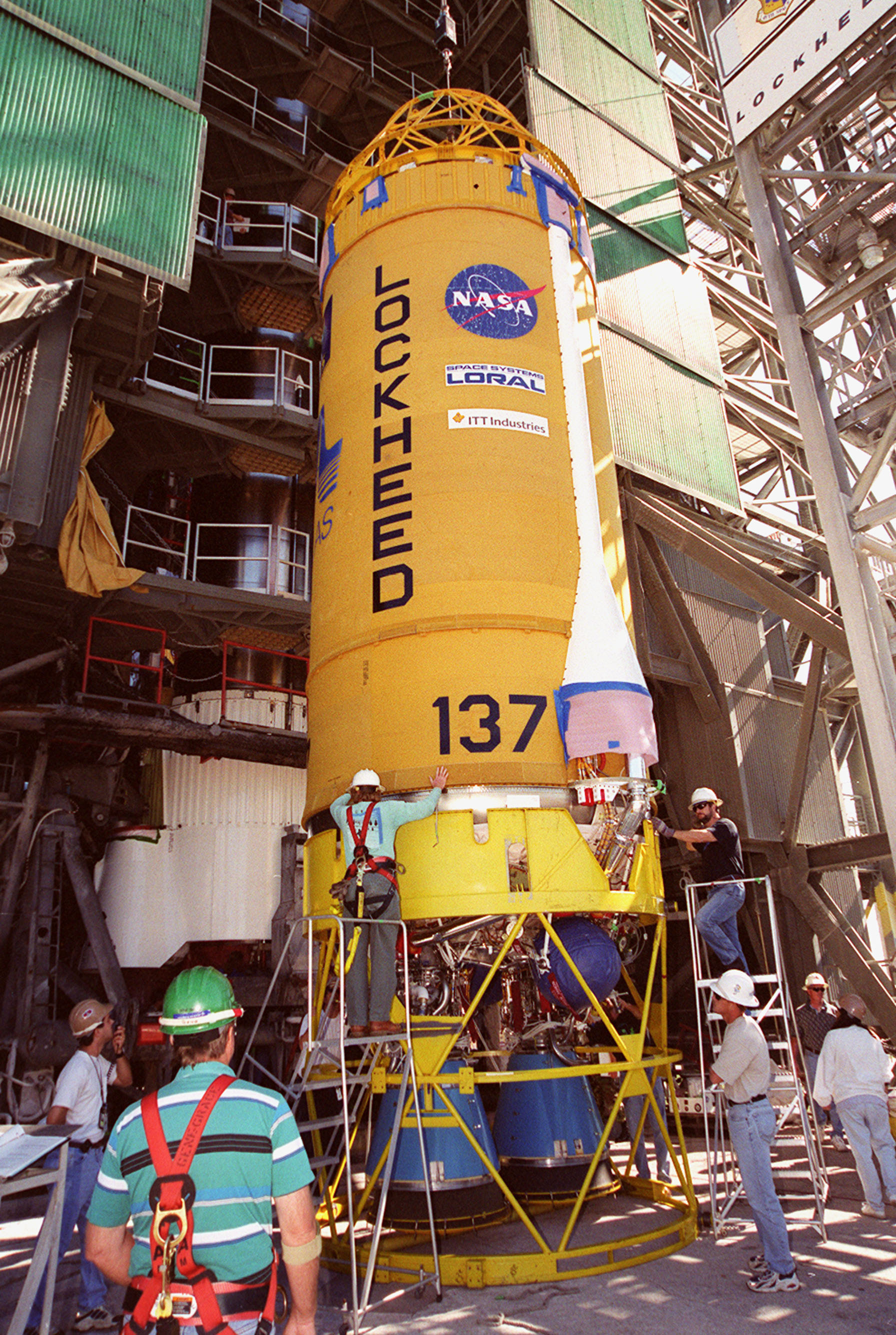
Centaur IIA before mating with Atlas II booster.

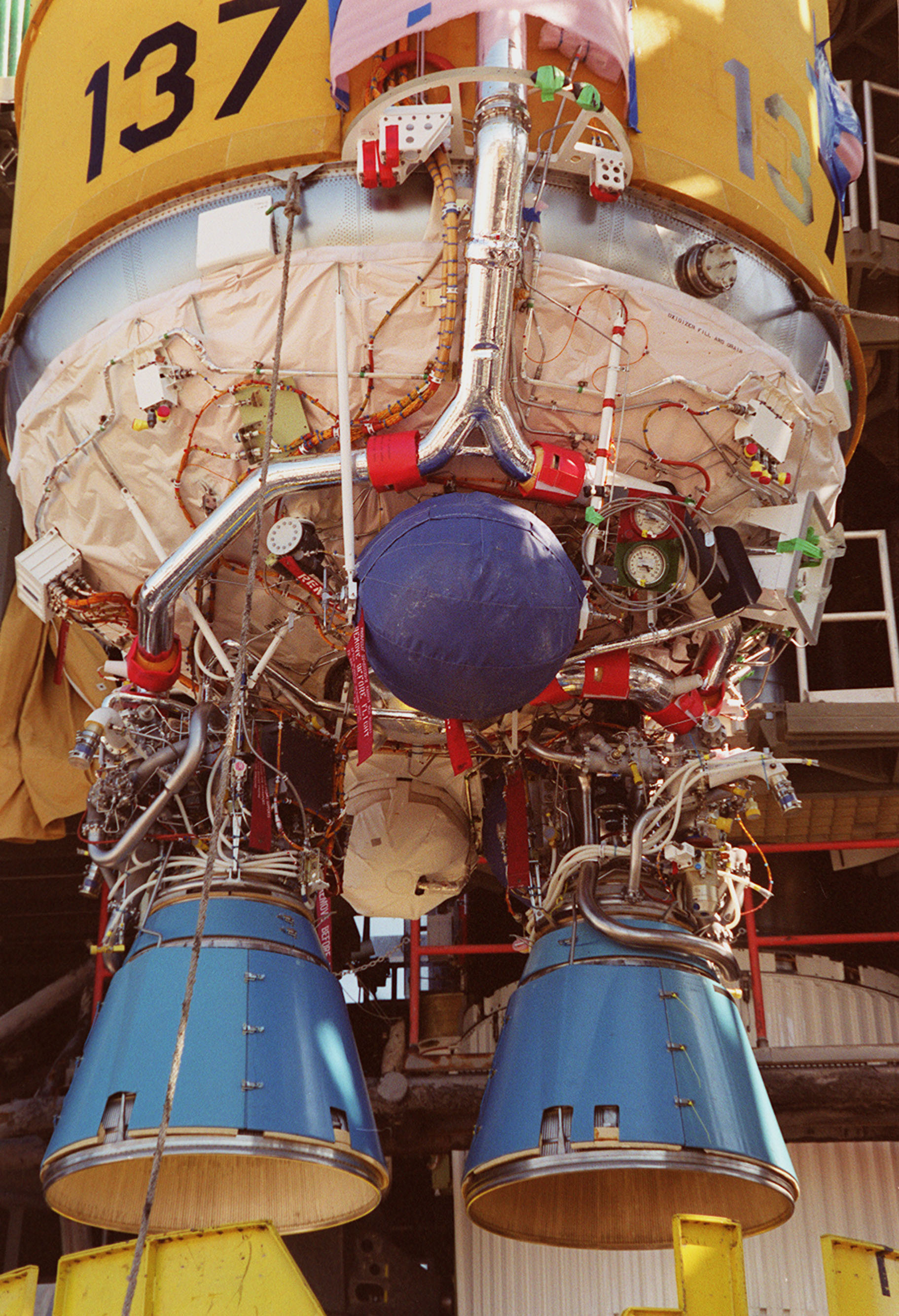
A close-up view of the RL10 engines of Centaur IIA.

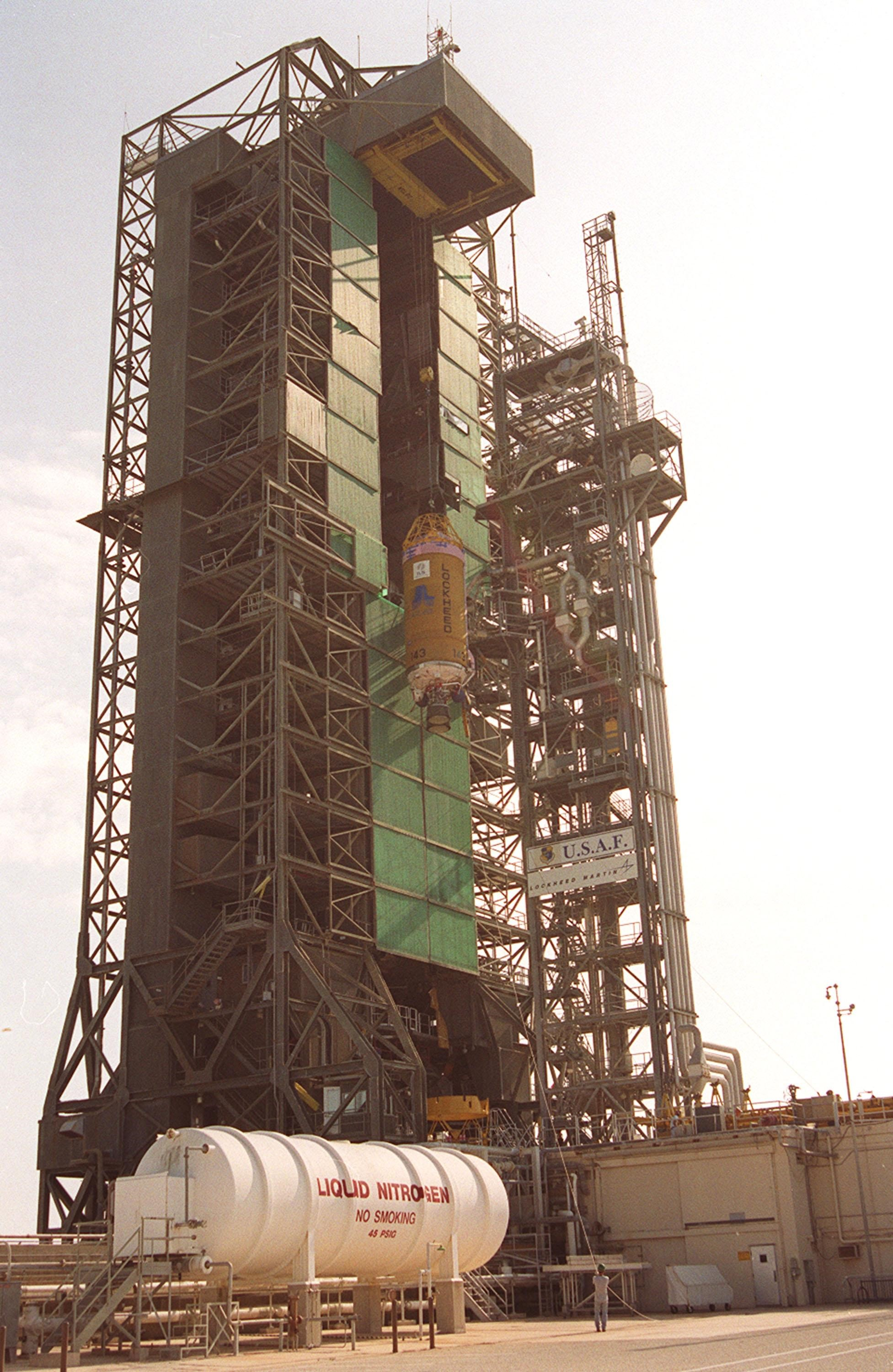
Centaur IIA, to be used to launch TDRS-I, is lifted for integration.

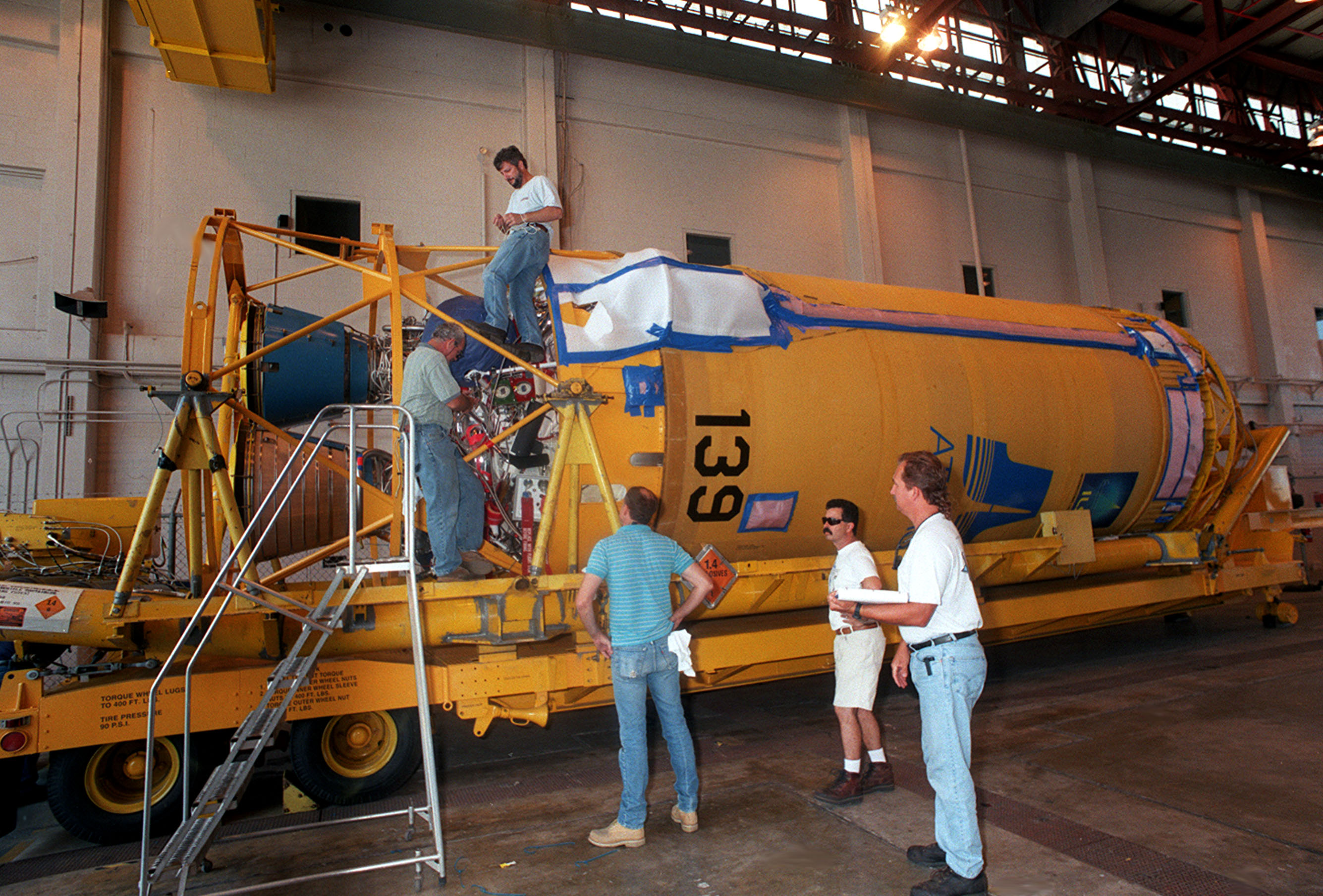
Centaur IIA for the TDRS-I mission is inspected in Hangar J at Cape Canaveral.

=== Integrated Apogee Boost Stage ===
The Integrated Apogee Boost Stage was an optional upper stage, used only as an apogee kick stage when launching Defense Satellite Communications System III satellites (which were designed to be delivered directly to geostationary orbit using the Transtage or Inertial Upper Stage, and so were not capable of performing their own circularization burn at the apogee of their geostationary transfer orbit) on board the Atlas II and, later, the Delta IV. It was powered by two R-4D engines and could operate on-orbit for up to twelve days before deploying its payload, allowing additional flexibility in mission planning. The IABS measured 2.9 m in diameter, and 0.68 m in length, carrying 1303 kg of propellant with a dry mass of 275 kg.

=== Payload fairing ===
Three fairing models were available for the Atlas II:

- Medium, with a diameter of 3.3 m (11 ft), a height of 10.4 m (34 ft), and a mass of 1,409 kg (3,106 lb)
- Large, with a diameter of 4.2 m (14 ft), a height of 12.2 m (40 ft), and a mass of 2,087 kg (4,601 lb)
- Extended, with a diameter of 4.2 m (14 ft), a height of 13.1 m (43 ft), and a mass of 2,255 kg (4,971 lb)

The Medium variant was not commonly used for Atlas II but was often used in earlier Atlas rockets. The Large and Extended fairing options were also later used on the Atlas III and Atlas V rockets. For the Atlas V, these fairings were part of the 400-series of that rocket, and a further extended option ("Extra Extended") was available. The 4-meter Atlas fairing last flew in 2022.

Atlas II rockets flying with a Medium fairing could move the most payload to orbit, as that fairing was the lightest. Similarly, rockets with Large or Extended fairings suffered slight hits to their payload capacity.

== Versions ==
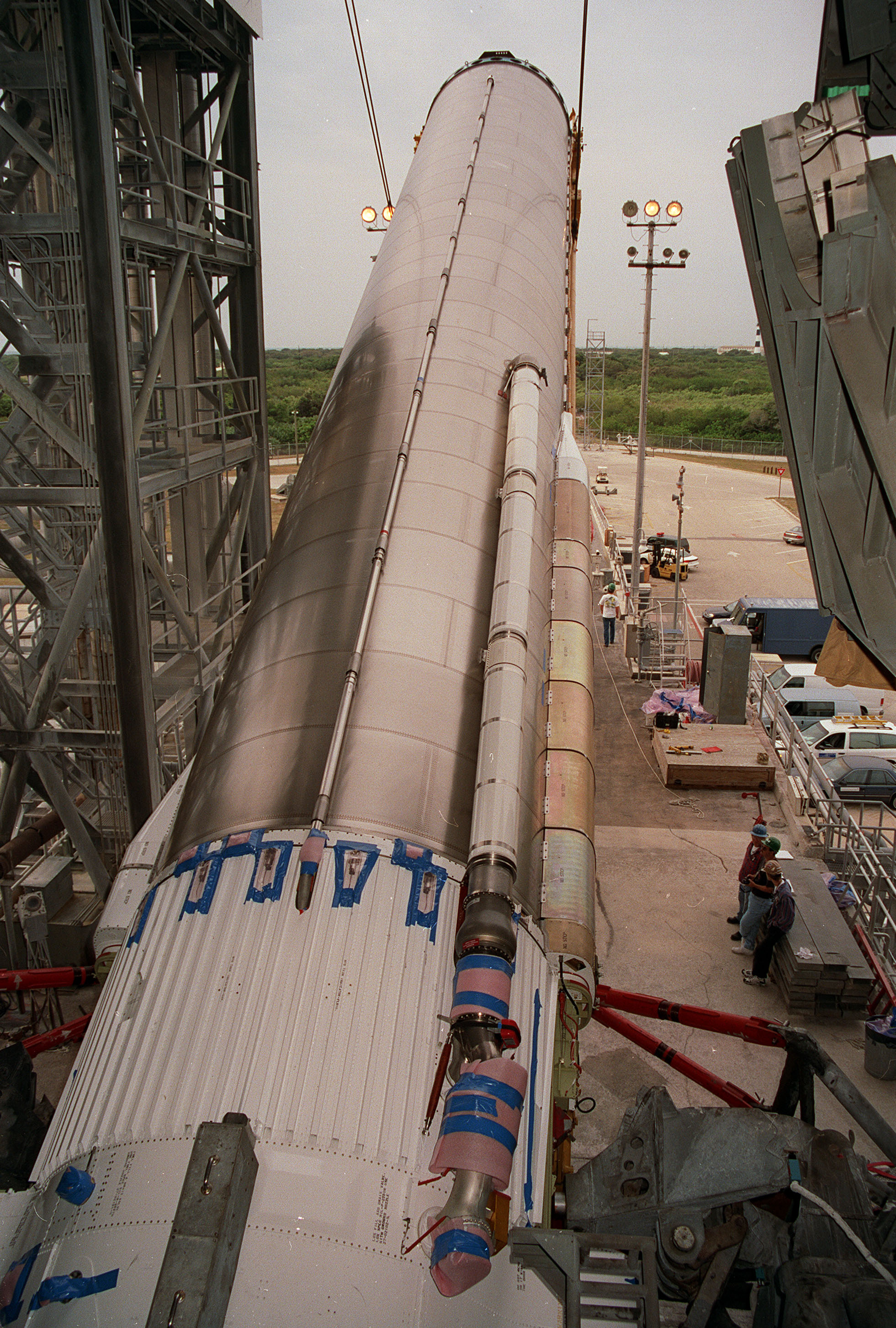
The first stage of an Atlas IIA rocket is erected vertical at Cape Canaveral Pad 36A.

Atlas II was developed into three versions.

=== Atlas II ===
The original Atlas II was based on the Atlas I and its predecessors. Its lengthened propellant tanks and improved electronics over the Atlas I offered better performance. It was designed to work as part of the US Air Force's Medium Launch Vehicle II program. This version flew between 1991 and 1998.

=== Atlas IIA ===
Atlas IIA was a derivative of the Atlas II designed to service the commercial launch market. The main improvement was the switch from the RL10A-4 engine on the Centaur upper stage, increasing the stage's performance and the vehicle's payload capability. The IIA version flew between 1992 and 2002.

=== Atlas IIAS ===
Atlas IIAS was largely identical to IIA, but added four Castor 4A solid rocket boosters to increase performance. These boosters were ignited in pairs, with one pair igniting on the ground, and the second igniting in the air shortly after the first pair separated. The half-stage booster section would then drop off as usual. IIAS was used between 1993 and 2004, concurrently with IIA.

== Specifications ==
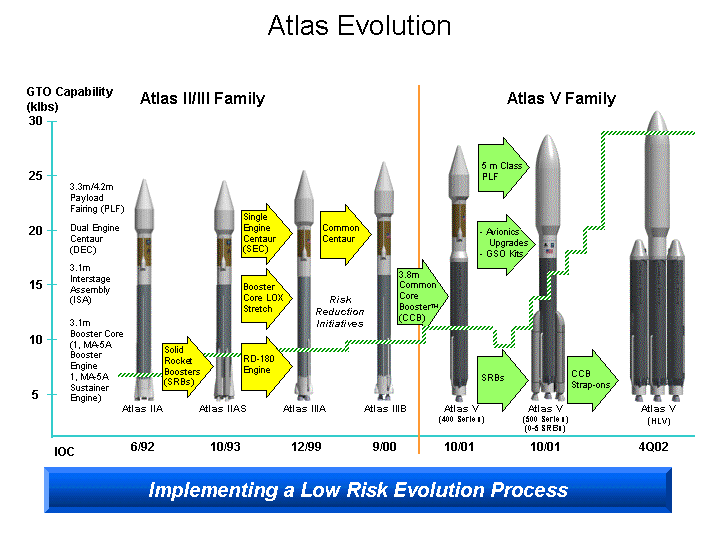
Atlas launch vehicle evolution, including the unflown Atlas V HLV (far right)

- Primary contractor: Lockheed Martin (airframe, assembly, avionics, test and systems integration)
- Principal subcontractors: Rocketdyne (first stage engines), Pratt & Whitney (second stage engines), Honeywell & Teledyne (avionics), and Thiokol (solid rocket boosters)
- Engines:
  - First stage: 1 × RS-56-OSA
  - Boosters (MA-5A): 1 × RS-56-OBA each (2 total)
  - Boosters (Atlas IIAS): 1 × Castor 4A each (4 total)
  - Second stage: 2 × RL10A-3-3A or RL10A-4
- Thrust: 494,500 lbf (2,200 kN)
- Length: Up to 156 ft (47.54 m); 16 ft (4.87 m) high engine cluster
- Core diameter: 10 feet (3.04 m)
- Gross liftoff weight: 414,000 lb (204,300 kg)
- Fairing options: 3 (Medium, Large, Extended)
- Models: II, IIA, and IIAS
- Launch Sites: Cape Canaveral, LC-36 and Vandenberg, SLC-3E

== See also ==
- Comparison of orbital launcher families
- Atlas I
- Atlas III
- Atlas (rocket family)
