= Progress M-39 =

Russian cargo spacecraft

- A Progress-M spacecraft
- Mission type: Mir resupply
- COSPAR ID: 1998-031A
- SATCAT no.: 25340

Spacecraft properties
- Spacecraft: Progress (No.238)
- Spacecraft type: Progress-M
- Manufacturer: RKK Energia

Start of mission
- Launch date: 14 May 1998, 22:12:59 UTC
- Rocket: Soyuz-U
- Launch site: Baikonur, Site 1/5

End of mission
- Disposal: Deorbited
- Decay date: 29 October 1998, 03:27:00 UTC

Orbital parameters
- Reference system: Geocentric
- Regime: Low Earth
- Perigee altitude: 194 km
- Apogee altitude: 238 km
- Inclination: 51.7°
- Period: 88.5 minutes
- Epoch: 14 May 1998

Docking with Mir
- Docking port: Kvant-1 aft
- Docking date: 16 May 1998, 23:50:33 UTC
- Undocking date: 12 August 1998, 09:28:52 UTC

Docking with Mir
- Docking port: Kvant-1 aft
- Docking date: 1 September 1998, 05:34:40 UTC
- Undocking date: 25 October 1998, 23:03:24 UTC

Progress M-39 (Russian: Прогресс M-39) was a Russian unmanned Progress cargo spacecraft, which was launched in May 1998 to resupply the Mir space station.

== Launch ==
Progress M-39 launched on 14 May 1998 from the Baikonur Cosmodrome in Kazakhstan. It used a Soyuz-U rocket.

== Docking ==
Progress M-39 docked with the aft port of the Kvant-1 module of Mir on 16 May 1998 at 23:50:33 UTC, and was undocked on 12 August 1998 at 09:28:52 UTC, to make way for Soyuz TM-28. Following the redocking of Soyuz TM-28 to the Mir Core Module forward port, Progress M-39 was redocked to the Kvant-1 aft port on 1 September 1998 at 05:34:40 UTC. Progress M-39 was finally undocked on 25 October 1998 at 23:03:24 UTC.

== Decay ==
It remained in orbit until 29 October 1998, when it was deorbited. The deorbit burn occurred at 03:27:00 UTC, with the mission ending at 04:14:52 UTC.

== See also ==
- 1998 in spaceflight
- List of Progress missions
- List of uncrewed spaceflights to Mir
