= Higher School of Coaches =

Sports school in Russia

Higher School of Coaches (Russian: Высшая школа тренеров, ВШТ, Vysshaya shkola trenerov) is a professional school which specializes in sports education. It was first created as part of the Soviet sports education system in Moscow on April 6, 1976. The school is part of the Russian State University of Physical Culture which from 1920 to 1991 was known as the State Central Institute of Physical Culture. The Higher School of Coaches became inherited by the former republics of the Soviet Union and similar schools were organized in Belarus, Ukraine and other republics.

== Overview ==
During the Soviet period the school issued licenses to coaches of the Soviet Top League and for the first 10 years of the school's existence 193 persons received diplomas of the higher qualification in football. Out of those graduates 97 were members of the Communist Party of the Soviet Union, while among graduates were 11 sportspeople with a title of Merited Masters of Sports, 6 - Master of Sports, World Class, 156 - Master of Sports and candidates to Master of Sports. Thirty two graduates were delegated as coaches to teams of the Soviet Top League, 27 - to teams of the Soviet First League, 196 - to teams of the Soviet Second League, while another 16 were delegated to national teams of the USSR, republics or football governing agencies.

Its practical applications students conducted in the School of Higher Sport Mastery of the State Central Institute of Physical Culture that was based at the Palace of Sports Izmailovo.

The school was issuing top licenses for the Russian Football Union until 2012 when it was degraded and replaced as a top coaching school with the Academy of Coaching Mastery.

== Notable alumni ==
- Eduard Malofeyev
- Valery Nepomnyashchy

== See also ==
- FC Sportakademklub Moscow
