= Progress M-38 =

Russian cargo spacecraft

- A Progress-M spacecraft
- Mission type: Mir resupply
- COSPAR ID: 1998-015A
- SATCAT no.: 25256

Spacecraft properties
- Spacecraft: Progress (No.240)
- Spacecraft type: Progress-M
- Manufacturer: RKK Energia

Start of mission
- Launch date: 14 March 1998, 22:45:55 UTC
- Rocket: Soyuz-U
- Launch site: Baikonur, Site 1/5

End of mission
- Disposal: Deorbited
- Decay date: 15 May 1998, 21:39:00 UTC

Orbital parameters
- Reference system: Geocentric
- Regime: Low Earth
- Perigee altitude: 193 km
- Apogee altitude: 249 km
- Inclination: 51.6°
- Period: 88.6 minutes
- Epoch: 14 March 1998

Docking with Mir
- Docking port: Kvant-1 aft
- Docking date: 17 March 1998, 00:31:17 UTC
- Undocking date: 15 May 1998, 18:43:54 UTC

Progress M-38 (Russian: Прогресс M-38) was a Russian unmanned Progress cargo spacecraft, which was launched in March 1998 to resupply the Mir space station.

== Launch ==
Progress M-38 launched on 14 March 1998 from the Baikonur Cosmodrome in Kazakhstan. It used a Soyuz-U rocket.

== Docking ==
Progress M-38 docked with the aft port of the Kvant-1 module of Mir on 17 March 1998 at 00:31:17 UTC, and was undocked on 15 May 1998 at 18:43:54 UTC.

== Decay ==
It remained in orbit until 15 May 1998, when it was deorbited. The deorbit burn occurred at 21:39:00 UTC, with the mission ending at 22:26 UTC.

== See also ==
- 1998 in spaceflight
- List of Progress missions
- List of uncrewed spaceflights to Mir
