= Makeyev =

Makeyev (Russian: Маке́ев) is a Russian surname that may refer to:

- Alexei Makeyev (born 1991), Russian ice hockey player
- Oleg Makeyev (born 1978), Russian footballer
- Pavel Makeyev (born 1966), Russian football coach
- Sergei Makeyev (born 1966), Russian footballer
- Viktor Makeyev (1924–1985), Soviet scientist
- Yevgeni Makeyev (born 1989), Russian footballer

== See also ==
- Makeyev Rocket Design Bureau, a Russian missile design company
