= RS-27 =

American kerolox rocket engine

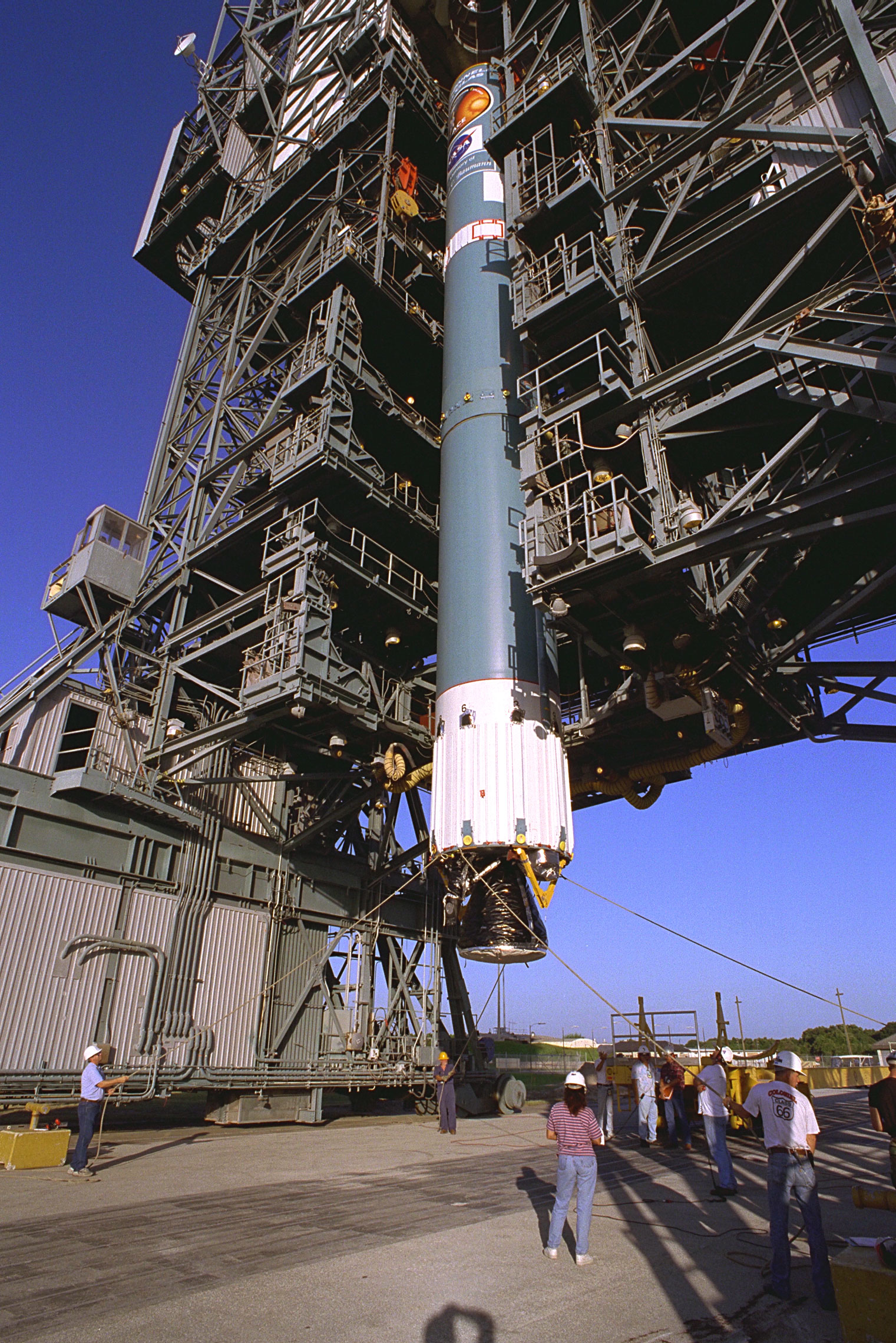
- First stage of a Delta II rocket, including an RS-27
- Country of origin: United States
- Date: 1974
- Designer: Rocketdyne
- Manufacturer: Rocketdyne
- Application: Booster
- Predecessor: H-1
- Successor: RS-56
- Status: Retired

Liquid-fuel engine
- Propellant: LOX / RP-1
- Cycle: Gas-generator

Configuration
- Chamber: 1

Performance
- Thrust, vacuum: RS-27: 1,023 kN (230,000 lb_{f}); RS-27A: 1,054.2 kN (237,000 lb_{f})
- Thrust, sea-level: RS-27: 971 kN (218,000 lb_{f}); RS-27A: 890.1 kN (200,100 lb_{f})
- Chamber pressure: RS-27: 4.9 MPa (49 bar; 710 psi); RS-27A: 4.8 MPa (48 bar; 700 psi)
- Specific impulse, vacuum: RS-27: 295 s (2.89 km/s); RS-27A: 302 s (2.96 km/s)
- Specific impulse, sea-level: RS-27: 264 s (2.59 km/s); RS-27A: 255 s (2.50 km/s)
- Burn time: RS-27: 274 s; RS-27A: 265 s

Dimensions
- Length: RS-27: 3.63 m (11.9 ft); RS-27A: 3.78 m (12.4 ft)
- Diameter: RS-27: 1.07 m (3 ft 6 in); RS-27A: 1.70 m (5 ft 7 in)
- Dry mass: RS-27: 1,027 kg (2,264 lb); RS-27A: 1,147 kg (2,529 lb)

Used in
- Delta 2000, 3000, 5000, 6000 first stage (RS-27); Delta 7000, 8000 first stage (RS-27A)

The RS-27 (Rocket System-27) was a liquid-propellant rocket engine developed in 1974 by Rocketdyne to replace the aging MB-3 in the Delta. Incorporating components of the venerable MB-3 and the H-1 designs, the RS-27 was a modernized version of the basic design used for two decades. It was used to power the first stage of the Delta 2000, 3000, 5000, and the first model of the Delta II, the Delta 6000.

The RS-27 was a modified Rocketdyne H-1 built to power the first stage of the Saturn I and Saturn IB and replaced the MB-3 engine that had been used on previous versions of the Delta launcher. NASA had a large supply of surplus H-1 engines in the early 1970s, as the Apollo program was ending. In addition to its main engine, the RS-27 included two vernier engines to provide vehicle roll control during flight. RS-27 was later developed into the RS-27A and RS-56.

== RS-27A ==
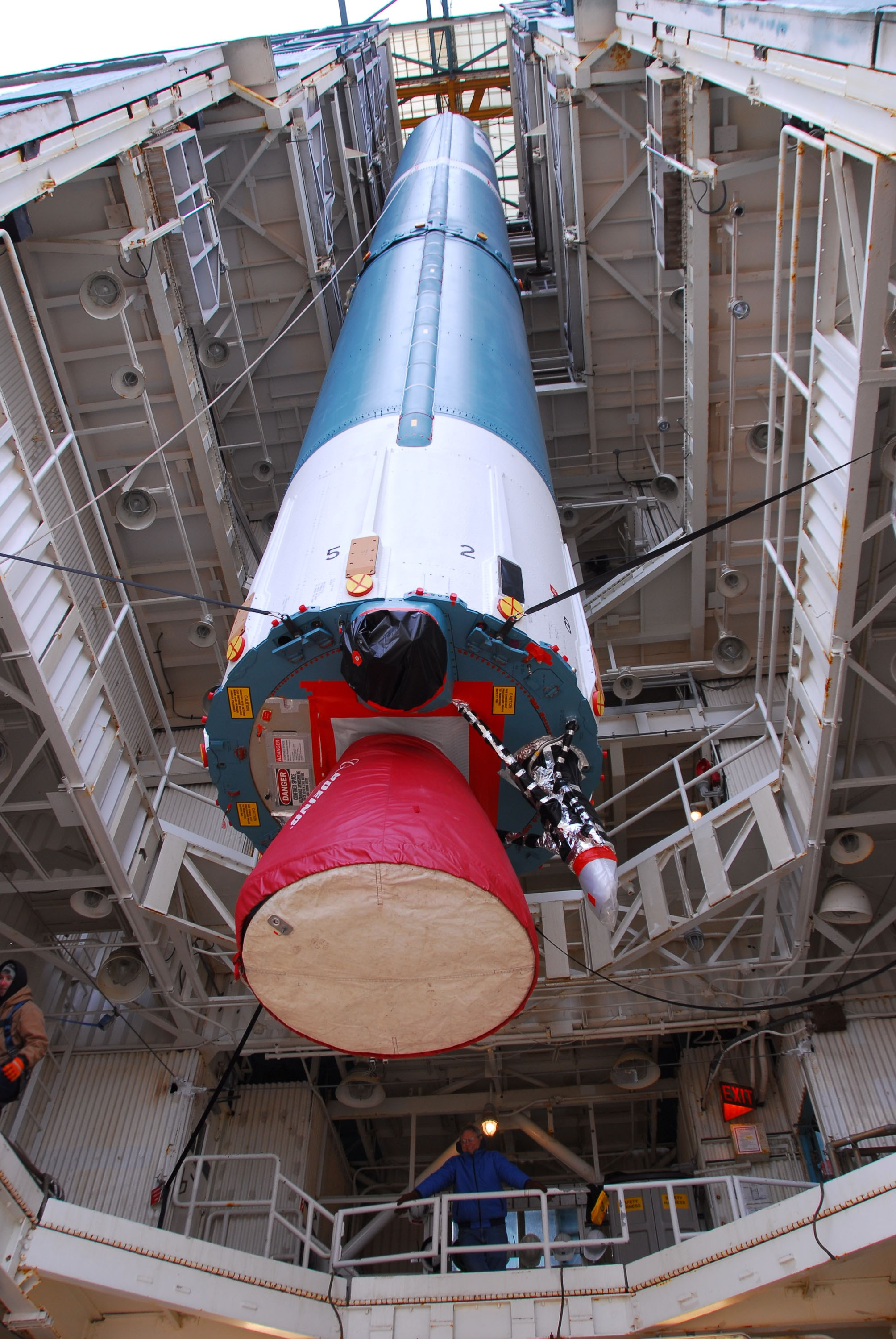
A covered RS-27A engine mounted on a Delta II first stage. Notice the turbopump exhaust to the right of the nozzle and the LR-101 vernier engine just above the nozzle (covered in black wrap).

The RS-27A is a liquid-fuel rocket engine developed in 1980s by Rocketdyne for use on the first stage of the Delta II and Delta III launch vehicles. It provides 1.05 meganewtons (240,000 lbf) of thrust burning RP-1 and LOX in a gas-generator cycle. The engine is a modified version of its predecessor, the RS-27; its thrust nozzle has been extended to increase its area ratio from 8:1 to 12:1, which provides greater efficiency at altitude.

The RS-27A main engine is neither restartable nor throttleable. In addition to its main engine, it includes two vernier engines to provide vehicle roll control during flight. When used as the main booster propulsion system for the Delta II family of launch vehicles, has an operational duration of 265 seconds. The last RS-27A engine was used for the ICESat-2 launch on 15 September 2018.
