= Coqui (NASA) =

NASA launched sounding rockets from Vega Baja, Puerto Rico

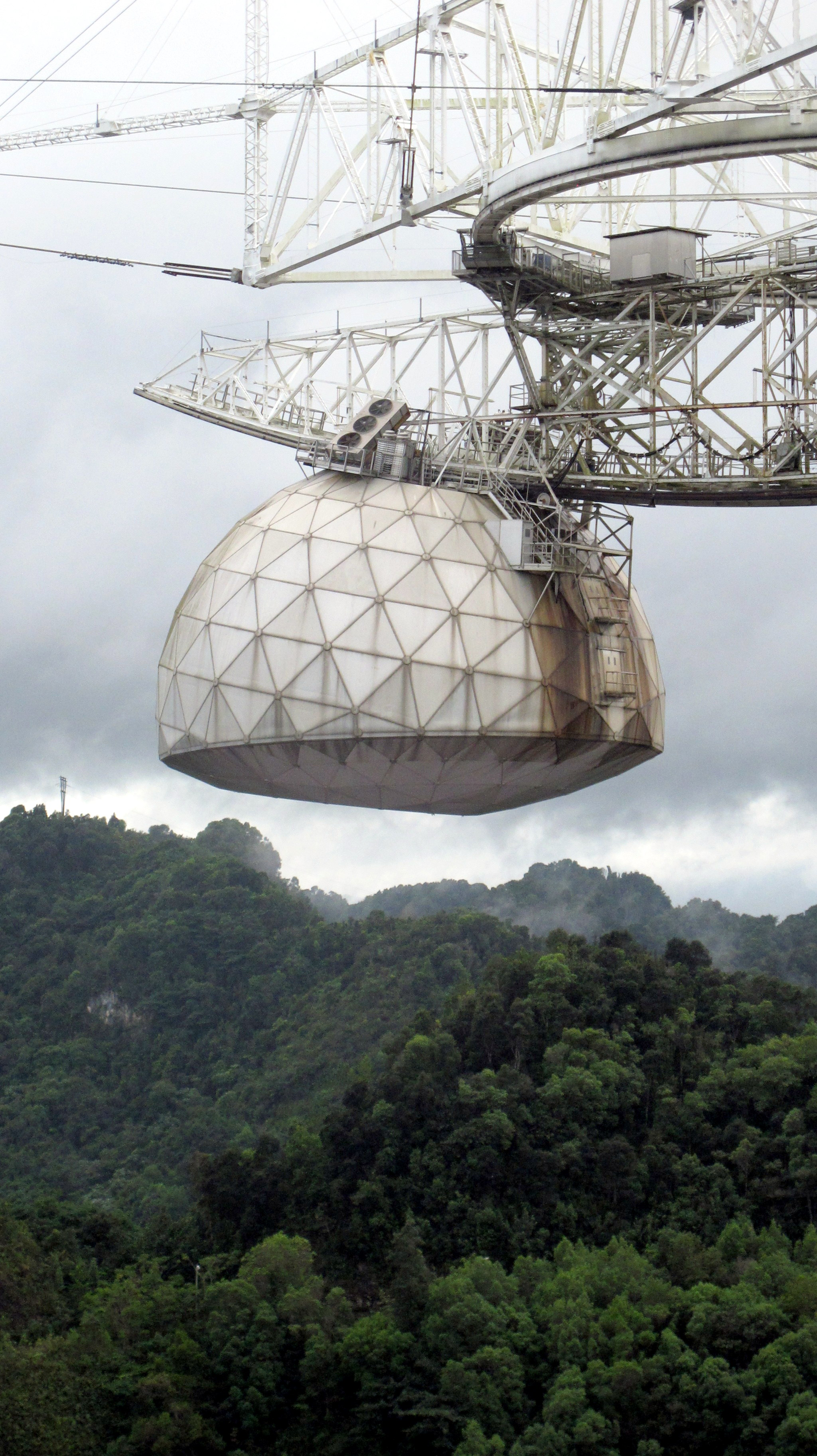
Arecibo Observatory with mountains before its demise on December 1, 2020

The Coquí and Coquí II (Coquí Dos and Coquí 2) campaign involved a sequence of sounding rocket launches in order to study the dynamics of the E- and F-region ionosphere and increase scientists' understanding of layering phenomena, such as sporadic E layers. The studies were supported by the United States' National Aeronautics and Space Administration (NASA) and carried out in 1992 and 1998, respectively.

NASA launched sounding rockets from the Puerto Rican coastal town of Vega Baja, about 20 miles west of San Juan. Among the stated goals were to study how the Earth's ionosphere reacts to naturally occurring phenomena by artificially simulating these phenomena using a high-frequency (HF) radar and study the ionospheric response with both the Arecibo Observatory ionospheric radar and with instruments and chemical tracers carried aboard the sounding rockets. The campaign was named for the coqui frog, which is a small frog in the genus Eleutherodactylus native to Puerto Rico.

The launches, which took place from the Tortuguero Launch Range, near Tortuguero Lagoon, to study the ionosphere above Puerto Rico, sparked protests, over the rockets being filled with chemicals.
