= Pavel Makeyev =

Russian football manager

Personal information
- Full name: Pavel Viktorovich Makeyev
- Date of birth: July 20, 1966 (age 60)

Team information
- Current team: FC Sportakademklub Moscow (manager)

Managerial career
- Years: Team
- 2008: FC Sportakademklub (Youth) Moscow (D4)
- 2009–: FC Sportakademklub Moscow

Pavel Viktorovich Makeyev (Russian: Павел Викторович Макеев; born July 20, 1966) is a Russian professional football coach currently managing FC Sportakademklub Moscow.
