= PANSAT =

Former American amateur radio satellite

- Mission type: Amateur radio satellite
- Operator: USAF
- COSPAR ID: 1998-064B
- SATCAT no.: 25520

Spacecraft properties
- Launch mass: 57 kg (126 lb)
- Dimensions: 50 cm (20 in)

Start of mission
- Launch date: 30 October 1998, 17:20 UTC
- Rocket: Space Shuttle Discovery STS-95
- Launch site: Kennedy LC-39B
- Contractor: NASA

End of mission
- Last contact: 2003

Orbital parameters
- Reference system: Geocentric
- Regime: Low Earth
- Eccentricity: 0.00072
- Perigee altitude: 551 km (342 mi)
- Apogee altitude: 561 km (349 mi)
- Inclination: 28.5°
- Period: 95.8 minutes
- Epoch: 30 October 1998

PANSAT (Petite Amateur Navy Satellite, also known as OSCAR 34) was an amateur radio satellite. It was launched by Space Shuttle Discovery during the STS-95 mission as part of the third International Extreme Ultraviolet Hitchhiker (IEH-3) mission, on 30 October 1998 from Kennedy Space Center, Florida.

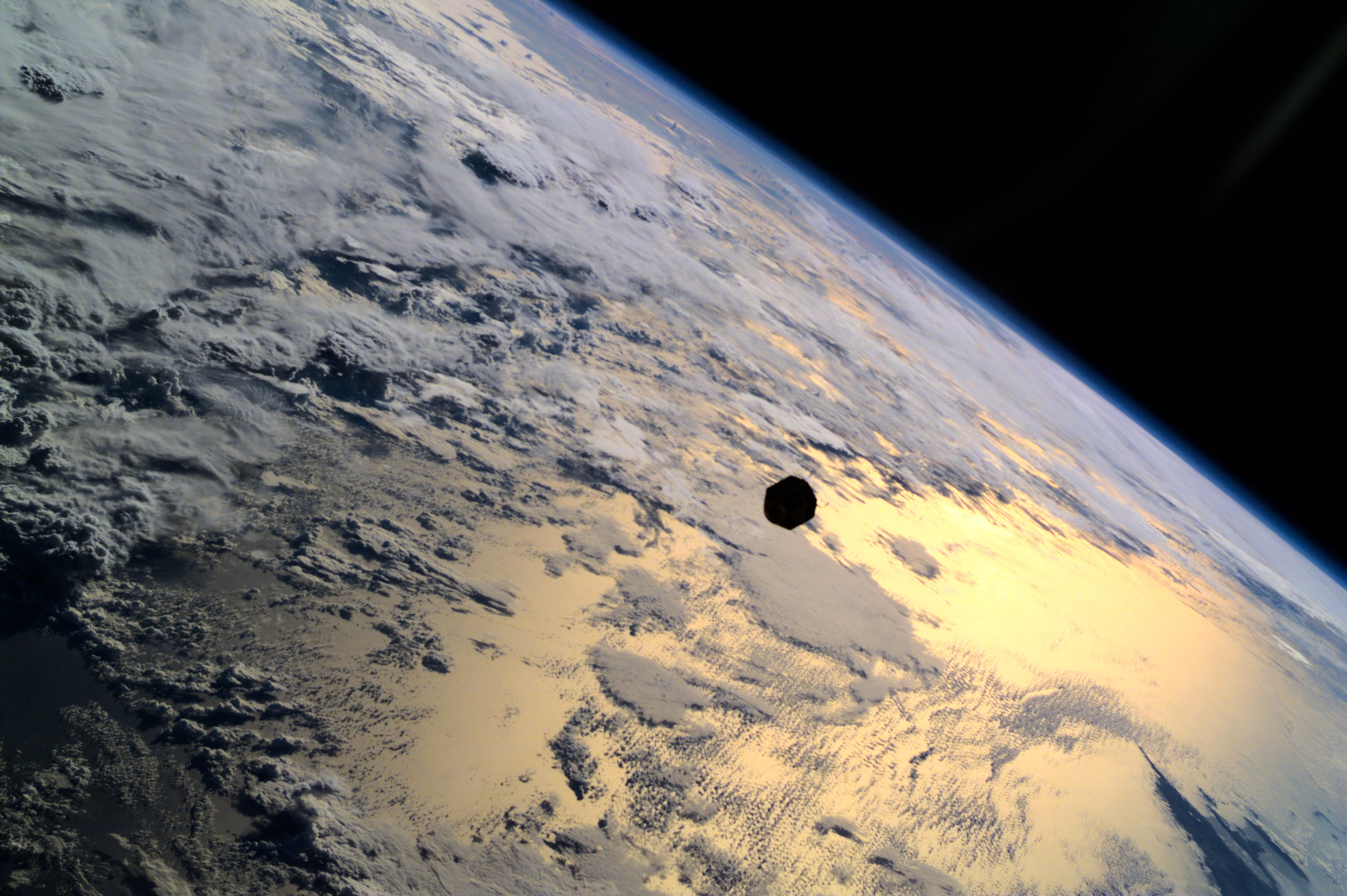
PANSAT satellite deployment from STS-95 Discovery's payload bay

The satellite was built by students from the Naval Postgraduate School in Monterey, California. It offered the possibility of packet radio transmission in BPSK or Direct-Sequence Spread Spectrum in the 70 cm band. The satellite was configured in a sphere-like shape, featuring 26 sides used for solar cell and antenna placement. The spacecraft supplied direct-sequence, spread-spectrum modulation with an operating center frequency of 436.5 MHz, a bit rate of 9600 bit/s and 9 MB of message storage.
