= Sergei Dolmatov (footballer) =

Russian footballer

Personal information
- Full name: Sergei Viktorovich Dolmatov
- Date of birth: 20 May 1980 (age 46)
- Place of birth: Lipetsk, Russian SFSR
- Height: 1.75 m (5 ft 9 in)
- Positions: Midfielder; forward

Youth career
- FC Metallurg Lipetsk

Senior career*
Years	Team	Apps	(Gls)
2001–2006	FC Metallurg Lipetsk	179	(26)
2007	FC Tekstilshchik-Telekom Ivanovo	23	(1)
2008	FC Metallurg Lipetsk	11	(3)
2009	FC Druzhba Maykop	10	(0)
2010	FC Metallurg Lipetsk	16	(1)
- * Club domestic league appearances and goals

Sergei Viktorovich Dolmatov (Russian: Серге́й Викторович Долматов; born 20 May 1980) is a former Russian professional football player.

== Club career ==
Dolmatov played for FC Metallurg Lipetsk in the Russian Football National League and Russian Second Division from 2001 through 2010.
