= FC Sportakademklub Moscow =

Sportakademklub
- Full name: FC Sportakademklub Moscow
- Founded: 1992; 34 years ago
- Ground: Stadium FOP "Izmaylovo"
- Capacity: 10,000
- Chairman: Andrey Leksakov
- Manager: Pavel Makeyev
- League: Amateur Football League, Moscow Championship - Division A 2021, 5th
- 5th
Home colours	Away colours

Historical logo

FC Sportakademklub Moscow (Russian: ФК «Спортакадемклуб») is a Russian professional association football club, based in Moscow. It played professionally overall from 1994 to 2010. One of its known players was Ilyos Zeytulayev, playing in the youth squad.

== History ==
The football club was founded in 1992. In that year, the football team Mashinostroitel was organised in the town of Sergiyev Posad near Moscow at the local machine-building plant and they stayed there until 1997.

Despite finishing outside the Russian First Division relegation zone in 2008 (the only season the team spent in the second-tier competition), the club could not afford to participate in the 2009 season in the division and volunteered to get relegated to the Russian Second Division for 2009 season. In 2010 season they were relegated from the Russian Second Division to the amateur fourth-tier Amateur Football League. In October 2010 Sportakademklub lost 0:2 to Lokomotiv-2 at home, took the last place in the West Zone of the Second Division, and since the season 2011/12 started playing in the Third Division.

== See also ==
- Higher School of Coaches (Moscow)
