= 1996 in spaceflight =

Orbital launches
- First: 11 January
- Last: 24 December
- Total: 77
- Successes: 69
- Failures: 4
- Partial failures: 4
- Catalogued: 73

National firsts
- Satellite: Malaysia

Rockets
- Maiden flights: Ariane 5G; J-I; Long March 3B

Crewed flights
- Orbital: 9
- Total travellers: 49

1996 in spaceflight

This article outlines notable events occurring in 1996 in spaceflight, including major launches and EVAs.

== Intelsat 708 launch failure ==
Intelsat 708, a telecommunications satellite constructed by the American company Space Systems/Loral for Intelsat, was destroyed on 15 February 1996, when the Long March 3B carrier rocket failed during its launch from the Xichang Satellite Launch Center (XSLC) in China. The launch vehicle deviated from its intended trajectory shortly after liftoff and struck a hillside near the main gate of the XSLC, causing damage to buildings on the launch centre's territory and flattening Mayelin Village. The incident resulted in the deaths of at least six people.

The accident investigation identified a failure in the guidance system of the Long March 3B. After the Intelsat 708 accident, the Long March rockets did not experience another mission failure until 2011. However, the participation of American companies in the Intelsat 708 and Apstar 2 investigations caused political controversy in the United States. A U.S. government investigation found that the information in the accident investigation report had been illegally transferred to China. Satellite technology was subsequently reclassified as a munition and placed under ITAR restrictions, blocking its export to China. In 2002, Space Systems/Loral paid US$20 million to settle charges of violating export controls.

== Orbital launches ==
- ← Jan
- Feb
- Mar
- Apr
- May
- Jun
- Jul
- Aug
- Sep
- Oct
- Nov
- Dec →

Date and time (UTC)	Rocket	Flight number	Launch site		LSP	
Date and time (UTC)	Payload (⚀ = CubeSat)	Operator	Orbit	Function	Decay (UTC)	Outcome
Date and time (UTC)	Remarks					
=== January ===
11 January; 09:41	(United States) Space Shuttle Endeavour		(United States) Kennedy LC-39B		(United States) United Space Alliance	
11 January; 09:41	(United States) STS-72	NASA	Low Earth	Satellite retrieval	20 January; 07:41	Successful
11 January; 09:41	(United States) OAST-Flyer	NASA	Low Earth	Technology development	20 January; 07:41	Successful
11 January; 09:41	Crewed orbital flight with six astronauts Retrieved Space Flyer Unit					
12 January; 23:10	(France) Ariane 4 (44L)		(France) Kourou ELA-2		(France) Arianespace	
12 January; 23:10	(United States) PAS-3R	PanAmSat	Geosynchronous	Communications	In orbit	Operational
12 January; 23:10	(Malaysia) Measat-1	Binariang	Geosynchronous	Communications	In orbit	Operational
12 January; 23:10	Measat-1 is the first Malaysian satellite					
14 January; 11:10	(United States) Delta II 7925		(United States) Cape Canaveral LC-17B		(United States) Boeing IDS	
14 January; 11:10	(South Korea) Koreasat-2	Korea Telecom	Current: Graveyard; Operational: Geosynchronous	Communications	In orbit	Successful
14 January; 11:10	Koreasat-2 retired on 8 April 2000					
16 January; 15:33	(Russia) Kosmos-3M		(Russia) Plesetsk Site 132/1		(Russia)	
16 January; 15:33	(Russia) Kosmos 2327 (Parus)	MO RF	Low Earth	Navigation	In orbit	Operational
25 January; 09:56	(Russia) Proton-K/DM-2		(Kazakhstan) Baikonur Site 200/39		(Russia)	
25 January; 09:56	(Russia) Gorizont 31	MOM	Geosynchronous	Communications	In orbit	Successful
=== February ===
1 February; 01:15	(United States) Atlas IIAS		(United States) Cape Canaveral LC-36B		(United States) (Russia) International Launch Services	
1 February; 01:15	(Indonesia) Palapa C1	Telkom Indonesia	Geosynchronous	Communications	In orbit	Successful
5 February; 07:19	(France) Ariane 4 (44P)		(France) Kourou ELA-2		(France) Arianespace	
5 February; 07:19	(Japan) N-STAR b	NTT	Geosynchronous	Communications	In orbit	Operational
14 February; 19:01	(China) Long March 3B		(China) Taiyuan LC-2		(China) CASC	
14 February; 19:01	(United Nations) Intelsat 708	Intelsat	Intended: Geosynchronous	Communications	+22 seconds	Launch Failure
14 February; 19:01	Maiden flight of Long March 3B; Loss of control at T+2 seconds, exploded 20 seconds later; Six to hundred fatalities on the ground					
17 February; 20:43	(United States) Delta II 7925-8		(United States) Cape Canaveral LC-17B		(United States) Boeing IDS	
17 February; 20:43	(United States) NEAR	NASA	Erosian via Heliocentric	Asteroid probe	12 February 2001; 20:01	Successful
17 February; 20:43	Flyby of 253 Mathilde, entered orbit around and landed on 433 Eros; First probe to orbit and land on an asteroid Final contact received on 28 February 2001, and unsuccessfully attempted on 10 December 2002					
19 February; 00:58	(Ukraine) Tsyklon-3		(Russia) Plesetsk Site 32		(Russia)	
19 February; 00:58	(Russia) Gonets-D1	Roskosmos	Low Earth	Communications	In orbit	Operational
19 February; 00:58	(Russia) Gonets-D1	Roskosmos	Low Earth	Communications	In orbit	Operational
19 February; 00:58	(Russia) Gonets-D1	Roskosmos	Low Earth	Communications	In orbit	Operational
19 February; 00:58	(Russia) Kosmos 2328 (Strela-3)	MO RF	Low Earth	Communications	In orbit	Operational
19 February; 00:58	(Russia) Kosmos 2329 (Strela-3)	MO RF	Low Earth	Communications	In orbit	Operational
19 February; 00:58	(Russia) Kosmos 2330 (Strela-3)	MO RF	Low Earth	Communications	In orbit	Operational
19 February; 08:19	(Russia) Proton-K/DM-2		(Kazakhstan) Baikonur Site 200/39		(Russia)	
19 February; 08:19	(Russia) Raduga 44L	MOM	Intended: Geosynchronous; Actual: Geosynchronous transfer	Communications	In orbit	Launch Failure
19 February; 08:19	Upper stage failed to ignite for second burn due to blocked valve					
21 February; 12:34	(Russia) Soyuz-U		(Kazakhstan) Baikonur Site 1/5		(Russia) Roskosmos	
21 February; 12:34	(Russia) Soyuz TM-23	Roskosmos	Low Earth (Mir)	Mir EO-21	2 September; 07:41	Successful
21 February; 12:34	Crewed orbital flight with two cosmonauts					
22 February; 20:18	(United States) Space Shuttle Columbia		(United States) Kennedy LC-39B		(United States) United Space Alliance	
22 February; 20:18	(United States) STS-75	NASA	Low Earth	USMP-3	9 March; 13:58	Successful
22 February; 20:18	(United States) TSS-1R	NASA	Low Earth	Tether satellite	19 March	Failure
22 February; 20:18	(United States) EDO Pallet	NASA	Low Earth (Columbia)	Cryogenic mission extension pallet	9 March; 13:58	Successful
22 February; 20:18	Crewed orbital flight with seven astronauts TSS-1R tether snapped during deployment; Intended to be returned to Earth by Columbia, but could not be recovered					
24 February; 11:24	(United States) Delta II 7925-10		(United States) Vandenberg SLC-2W		(United States) Boeing IDS	
24 February; 11:24	(United States) Polar	NASA	High Earth (elliptical)	Auroral research	In orbit	Successful
24 February; 11:24	Mission concluded in April 2008					
=== March ===
9 March; 01:53	(United States) Pegasus-XL		(United States) Stargazer, Vandenberg		(United States) Orbital Sciences	
9 March; 01:53	(United States) REX 2	US Air Force	Low Earth	Ionosphere research	In orbit	Operational
14 March; 07:11	(France) Ariane 4 (44LP)		(France) Kourou ELA-2		(France) Arianespace	
14 March; 07:11	(United Nations) Intelsat 707	Intelsat	Geosynchronous	Communications	In orbit	Operational
14 March; 17:40	(Russia) Soyuz-U		(Russia) Plesetsk Site 43/4		(Russia)	
14 March; 17:40	(Russia) Kosmos 2331 (Yantar-4K1)	MOM	Low Earth	Reconnaissance	11 June	Successful
21 March; 04:53	(India) PSLV		(India) Sriharikota FLP		(India) ISRO	
21 March; 04:53	(India) IRS-P3	ISRO	Sun-synchronous	Remote sensing	In orbit	Successful
22 March; 08:13	(United States) Space Shuttle Atlantis		(United States) Kennedy LC-39B		(United States) United Space Alliance	
22 March; 08:13	(United States) STS-76	NASA	Low Earth (Mir)	Shuttle-Mir flight	31 March; 13:28	Successful
22 March; 08:13	(United States) SpaceHab LSM	NASA/SpaceHab	Low Earth (Atlantis)	Logistics	31 March; 13:28	Successful
22 March; 08:13	Crewed orbital flight with six astronauts					
28 March; 00:21	(United States) Delta II 7925-9.5		(United States) Cape Canaveral LC-17B		(United States) Boeing IDS	
28 March; 00:21	(United States) USA-117 (GPS IIA-16)	US Air Force	Medium Earth	Navigation	In orbit	Operational
=== April ===
3 April; 23:01	(United States) Atlas IIA		(United States) Cape Canaveral LC-36A		(United States) (Russia) International Launch Services	
3 April; 23:01	(United Kingdom) Inmarsat 3F1	Inmarsat	Geosynchronous	Communications	In orbit	Operational
8 April; 23:09	(Russia) Proton-K/DM-2M		(Kazakhstan) Baikonur Site 81/23		(United States) (Russia) International Launch Services	
8 April; 23:09	(Luxembourg) Astra 1F	SES Astra	Geosynchronous	Communications	In orbit	Operational
20 April; 22:36	(France) Ariane 4 (42P)		(France) Kourou ELA-2		(France) Arianespace	
20 April; 22:36	(Canada) MSAT-1	TMI	Geosynchronous	Communications	In orbit	Operational
21 April; 11:48	(Russia) Proton-K		(Kazakhstan) Baikonur Site 81/23		(Russia) Roskosmos	
21 April; 11:48	(Russia) Priroda	Roskosmos	Low Earth (Mir)	Mir module	23 March 2001; 05:50	Successful
24 April; 12:27	(United States) Delta II 7920-10		(United States) Vandenberg SLC-2W		(United States) Boeing IDS	
24 April; 12:27	(United States) MSX	BMDO	Sun-synchronous	Infrared astronomy	In orbit	Successful
24 April; 12:27	Member of the Space Surveillance Network					
24 April; 13:00	(Russia) Kosmos-3M		(Russia) Plesetsk Site 132/1		(Russia)	
24 April; 13:00	(Russia) Kosmos 2332 (Taifun)	MO RF	Low Earth	Radar calibration	28 January 2005	Successful
24 April; 23:37	(United States) Titan IVA (401)/Centaur		(United States) Cape Canaveral LC-41		(United States) Lockheed Martin	
24 April; 23:37	(United States) USA-118 (Mercury-2)	NRO	Geosynchronous	ELINT	In orbit	Operational
30 April; 04:31	(United States) Atlas I		(United States) Cape Canaveral LC-36B		(United States) (Russia) International Launch Services	
30 April; 04:31	(Italy) BeppoSAX	ASI	Low Earth	X-ray astronomy	30 April 2003	Successful
=== May ===
5 May; 07:04	(Russia) Soyuz-U		(Kazakhstan) Baikonur Site 1/5		(Russia) Roskosmos	
5 May; 07:04	(Russia) Progress M-31	Roskosmos	Low Earth (Mir)	Logistics	1 August; 20:33	Successful
12 May; 21:32	(United States) Titan IVA (403)		(United States) Vandenberg SLC-4E		(United States) Lockheed Martin	
12 May; 21:32	(United States) USA-119 (NOSS 2–3)	NRO	Low Earth	SIGINT	In orbit	Operational
12 May; 21:32	(United States) USA-120 (NOSS 2–3)	NRO	Low Earth	SIGINT	In orbit	Operational
12 May; 21:32	(United States) USA-121 (NOSS 2–3)	NRO	Low Earth	SIGINT	In orbit	Operational
12 May; 21:32	(United States) USA-122 (NOSS 2–3)	NRO	Low Earth	SIGINT	In orbit	Operational
12 May; 21:32	(United States) USA-123 (TiPS)	NRL	Low Earth	Space tether experiment	In orbit	Operational
12 May; 21:32	(United States) USA-124 (TiPS)	NRL	Low Earth	Space tether experiment	In orbit	Operational
14 May; 08:55	(Russia) Soyuz-U		(Kazakhstan) Baikonur Site 31/6		(Russia)	
14 May; 08:55	(Russia) Yantar-1KFT	VKS	Intended: Low Earth	Reconnaissance	+ 49 seconds	Launch Failure
14 May; 08:55	Payload fairing disintegrated					
16 May; 01:56	(France) Ariane 4 (44L)		(France) Kourou ELA-2		(France) Arianespace	
16 May; 01:56	(Indonesia) Palapa C2	Telkom Indonesia	Geosynchronous	Communications	In orbit	Operational
16 May; 01:56	(Israel) AMOS 1	Spacecom	Geosynchronous	Communications	In orbit	Operational
17 May; 02:44	(United States) Pegasus-H		(United States) Stargazer, Vandenberg		(United States) Orbital Sciences	
17 May; 02:44	(United States) MSTI-3	BMDO	Low Earth	Technology development	11 December 1997	Successful
19 May; 10:30	(United States) Space Shuttle Endeavour		(United States) Kennedy LC-39B		(United States) United Space Alliance	
19 May; 10:30	(United States) STS-77	NASA	Low Earth	Microgravity research	29 May; 11:10	Successful
19 May; 10:30	(United States) SpaceHab LSM	NASA/SpaceHab	Low Earth (Endeavour)	Scientific experiments	29 May; 11:10	Successful
19 May; 10:30	(United States) SPARTAN-207	NASA	Low Earth	Technology demonstration	29 May; 11:10	Successful
19 May; 10:30	(United States) IAE	NASA	Low Earth	Technology demonstration	22 May	Successful
19 May; 10:30	(United States) PAMS	NASA	Low Earth	Technology demonstration	26 October	Successful
19 May; 10:30	Crewed orbital flight with six astronauts SPARTAN used to deploy the IAE satellite on 20 May; PAMS deployed on 22 May					
24 May; 01:09	(United States) Delta II 7925		(United States) Cape Canaveral LC-17B		(United States) Boeing IDS	
24 May; 01:09	(United States) Galaxy 9	PanAmSat	Geosynchronous	Communications	In orbit	Operational
25 May; 02:05	(Russia) Proton-K/DM-2		(Kazakhstan) Baikonur Site 200/39		(Russia)	
25 May; 02:05	(Russia) Gorizont 32	MOM	Geosynchronous	Communications	In orbit	Operational
=== June ===
4 June; 12:34	(France) Ariane 5G		(France) Kourou ELA-3		(France) Arianespace	
4 June; 12:34	Cluster F1	ESA	Intended: High Earth (elliptical)	Magnetosphere research	+37 seconds	Launch Failure
4 June; 12:34	Cluster F2	ESA	Intended: High Earth (elliptical)	Magnetosphere research	+37 seconds	Launch Failure
4 June; 12:34	Cluster F3	ESA	Intended: High Earth (elliptical)	Magnetosphere research	+37 seconds	Launch Failure
4 June; 12:34	Cluster F4	ESA	Intended: High Earth (elliptical)	Magnetosphere research	+37 seconds	Launch Failure
4 June; 12:34	Maiden flight of Ariane 5G; Ariane 5 Flight 501; Programming error led to rocket going off course					
15 June; 06:55	(France) Ariane 4 (44P)		(France) Kourou ELA-2		(France) Arianespace	
15 June; 06:55	(United Nations) Intelsat 709	Intelsat	Geosynchronous	Communications	In orbit	Operational
20 June; 14:49	(United States) Space Shuttle Columbia		(United States) Kennedy LC-39B		(United States) United Space Alliance	
20 June; 14:49	(United States) STS-78	NASA	Low Earth	Microgravity research	7 July; 12:36	Successful
20 June; 14:49	(United States) Spacelab Long Module 2	NASA	Low Earth (Columbia)	Spacelab LMS-1	7 July; 12:36	Successful
20 June; 14:49	(United States) EDO Pallet	NASA	Low Earth (Columbia)	Cryogenic mission extension pallet	7 July; 12:36	Successful
20 June; 14:49	Crewed orbital flight with seven astronauts					
20 June; 18:45	(Russia) Soyuz-U		(Russia) Plesetsk Site 16/2		(Russia)	
20 June; 18:45	(Russia) Yantar-4K1	VKS	Intended: Low Earth	Reconnaissance	+50 seconds	Launch Failure
20 June; 18:45	Payload fairing disintegrated					
=== July ===
2 July; 07:48	(United States) Pegasus-XL		(United States) Stargazer, Vandenberg		(United States) Orbital Sciences	
2 July; 07:48	(United States) TOMS-EP	NASA	Low Earth	Ozone mapping	In orbit	Operational
3 July; 00:31	(United States) Titan IVA (405)		(United States) Cape Canaveral LC-40		Lockheed Martin	
3 July; 00:31	(United States) USA-125 (SDS 2–4)	US Air Force	High Earth (elliptical)	Communications	In orbit	Operational
3 July; 10:47	(China) Long March 3		(China) Xichang LC-1		(China)	
3 July; 10:47	(China) Apstar 1A	APT	Geosynchronous	Communications	In orbit	Operational
9 July; 22:24	(France) Ariane 4 (44L)		(France) Kourou ELA-2		(France) Arianespace	
9 July; 22:24	(Saudi Arabia) Arabsat 2A	Arabsat	Geosynchronous	Communications	In orbit	Operational
9 July; 22:24	(Turkey) Turksat 1C	Türksat	Geosynchronous	Communications	In orbit	Operational
16 July; 00:50	(United States) Delta II 7925-9.5		(United States) Cape Canaveral LC-17A		(United States) Boeing IDS	
16 July; 00:50	(United States) USA-126 (GPS IIA-17)	US Air Force	Medium Earth	Navigation	In orbit	Operational
25 July; 12:42	(United States) Atlas II		(United States) Cape Canaveral LC-36A		(United States)	
25 July; 12:42	(United States) USA-127 (UHF F/O F7)	US Air Force	Geosynchronous	Communications	In orbit	Operational
31 July; 20:00	(Russia) Soyuz-U		(Kazakhstan) Baikonur Site 1/5		(Russia) Roskosmos	
31 July; 20:00	(Russia) Progress M-32	Roskosmos	Low Earth (Mir)	Logistics	20 November; 22:42	Successful
=== August ===
8 August; 22:49	(France) Ariane 4 (44L)		(France) Kourou ELA-2		(France) Arianespace	
8 August; 22:49	(Italy) Italsat F2	ASI	Geosynchronous	Communications	In orbit	Operational
8 August; 22:49	(France) Telecom 2D	France Télécom	Geosynchronous	Communications	In orbit	Operational
14 August; 22:20	(Russia) Molniya-M		(Russia) Plesetsk Site 43/3		(Russia)	
14 August; 22:20	(Russia) Molniya 1-89	MOM	Molniya	Communications	7 April 2012	Successful
17 August; 01:58	(Japan) H-II		(Japan) Tanegashima LA-Y1		(Japan) NASDA	
17 August; 01:58	(Japan) ADEOS (Midori)	NASDA	Low Earth	Atmospheric research	In orbit	Operational
17 August; 01:58	(Japan) JAS-2 (Fuji-2)	JARL	Low Earth	Communications	In orbit	Operational
17 August; 13:18	(Russia) Soyuz-U		(Kazakhstan) Baikonur Site 1/5		(Russia) Roskosmos	
17 August; 13:18	(Russia) Soyuz TM-24	Roskosmos	Low Earth (Mir)	Mir EO-22	2 March 1997; 06:44	Successful
17 August; 13:18	Crewed orbital flight with three cosmonauts					
18 August; 10:27	(China) Long March 3		(China) Xichang LC-1		(China)	
18 August; 10:27	(China) Chinasat 7	Chinasat	Intended: Geosynchronous; Actual: High Earth (elliptical)	Communications	In orbit	Launch Failure
18 August; 10:27	Third stage failure left satellite in useless orbit					
21 August; 09:47	(United States) Pegasus-XL		(United States) Stargazer, Vandenberg		(United States) Orbital Sciences	
21 August; 09:47	(United States) FAST	NASA	Low Earth	Magnetosphere research	In orbit	Operational
29 August; 05:22	(Russia) Molniya-M		(Russia) Plesetsk Site 43/3		(Russia)	
29 August; 05:22	(Argentina) MUSAT	CONAE	Molniya	Magnetosphere research	12 November 1999	Successful
29 August; 05:22	(Russia) Interbol 2	Roskosmos	Molniya	Auroral research	In orbit	Operational
29 August; 05:22	(Czech Republic) Magion 5		Molniya	Auroral research	In orbit	Successful
=== September ===
4 September; 09:01	(Ukraine) Zenit-2		(Kazakhstan) Baikonur Site 45/1		(Russia)	
4 September; 09:01	(United States) Kosmos 2333 (Tselina-2)	MO RF	Low Earth	ELINT	In orbit	Operational
5 September; 12:47	(Russia) Kosmos-3M		(Russia) Plesetsk Site 132/1		(Russia)	
5 September; 12:47	(Russia) Kosmos 2334 (Parus)	MO RF	Low Earth	Navigation	In orbit	Operational
5 September; 12:47	(Mexico) Oscar 30	UNAMSAT	Low Earth	Communications	In orbit	Operational
6 September; 17:37	(Russia) Proton-K/DM-2		(Kazakhstan) Baikonur Site 81/23		(United States) (Russia) International Launch Services	
6 September; 17:37	(United Kingdom) Inmarsat 3F2	Inmarsat	Geosynchronous	Communications	In orbit	Operational
8 September; 21:49	(United States) Atlas IIA		(United States) Cape Canaveral LC-36B		(United States) (Russia) International Launch Services	
8 September; 21:49	(United States) GE 1	GE Americom	Geosynchronous	Communications	In orbit	Operational
11 September; 00:00	(France) Ariane 4 (42P)		(France) Kourou ELA-2		(France) Arianespace	
11 September; 00:00	(United States) Echostar II	EchoStar	Geosynchronous	Communications	In orbit	Successful
11 September; 00:00	Retired after malfunction on 14 July 2008					
12 September; 08:49	(United States) Delta II 7925-9.5		(United States) Cape Canaveral LC-17A		(United States) Boeing IDS	
12 September; 08:49	(United States) USA-128 (GPS IIA-18)	US Air Force	Medium Earth	Navigation	In orbit	Operational
16 September; 08:54	(United States) Space Shuttle Atlantis		(United States) Kennedy LC-39A		(United States) United Space Alliance	
16 September; 08:54	(United States) STS-79	NASA	Low Earth	Shuttle-Mir flight	26 September; 12:13	Successful
16 September; 08:54	(United States) SpaceHab LDM	NASA/SpaceHab	Low Earth (Atlantis)	Logistics	26 September; 12:13	Successful
16 September; 08:54	Crewed orbital flight with six astronauts					
26 September; 17:50	(Russia) Proton-K/DM-2M		(Kazakhstan) Baikonur Site 200/39		(Russia)	
26 September; 17:50	(Russia) Ekspress-6	RSCSC	Geosynchronous	Communications	In orbit	Operational
=== October ===
20 October; 07:20	(China) Long March 2D		(China) Jiuquan		(China)	
20 October; 07:20	(China) FSW-2-3	CASC	Low Earth	Reconnaissance	4 November	Successful
24 October; 11:37	(Russia) Molniya-M		(Russia) Plesetsk Site 43/4		(Russia)	
24 October; 11:37	(Russia) Molniya 3–48	MOM	Molniya	Communications	18 October 2007; 03:51	Successful
=== November ===
4 November; 17:08	(United States) Pegasus-XL		(United States) Stargazer, Wallops Island		(United States) Orbital Sciences	
4 November; 17:08	(United States) HETE	NASA	Low Earth	Astronomy	7 April 2002	Launch Failure
4 November; 17:08	(Argentina) SAC-B	CONAE	Low Earth	Technology development	7 April 2002	Launch Failure
4 November; 17:08	Both payloads failed to separate from the launch vehicle and each other					
7 November; 17:00	(United States) Delta II 7925		(United States) Cape Canaveral LC-17A		(United States) Boeing IDS	
7 November; 17:00	(United States) Mars Global Surveyor	NASA	Areocentric	Mars orbiter	In orbit	Successful
7 November; 17:00	Contact lost on 2 November 2006 and mission declared complete on 10 January 2007 after numerous troubleshooting attempts to regain contact.					
13 November; 22:40	(France) Ariane 4 (44L)		(France) Kourou ELA-2		(France) Arianespace	
13 November; 22:40	(Saudi Arabia) Arabsat 2B	Arabsat	Geosynchronous	Communications	In orbit	Operational
13 November; 22:40	(Malaysia) Measat-2	Binariang	Geosynchronous	Communications	In orbit	Operational
16 November; 20:48	(Russia) Proton-K/D-2		(Kazakhstan) Baikonur Site 200/39		(Russia) VKS	
16 November; 20:48	(Russia) Mars 96 (Mars-8)	VKS	Intended: Areocentric; Actual: Low Earth	Mars orbiter	17 November	Failure
16 November; 20:48	Upper stage failed to re-ignite for Earth orbit departure; re-entered the following day					
19 November; 19:55	(United States) Space Shuttle Columbia		(United States) Kennedy LC-39B		(United States) United Space Alliance	
19 November; 19:55	(United States) STS-80	NASA	Low Earth	Microgravity research	7 December; 11:49	Successful
19 November; 19:55	(United States) ORFEUS-SPAS	NASA	Low Earth	Ultraviolet astronomy	7 December; 11:49	Successful
19 November; 19:55	(United States) Wake Shield Facility	NASA	Low Earth	Materials research	7 December; 11:49	Successful
19 November; 19:55	(United States) EDO Pallet	NASA	Low Earth (Columbia)	Cryogenic mission extension pallet	7 December; 11:49	Successful
19 November; 19:55	Crewed orbital flight with five astronauts; All EVAs cancelled due to airlock malfunction; Longest-duration Space Shuttle flight in history Story Musgrave becomes the only American astronaut to fly on all five Space Shuttle orbiters ORFEUS-SPAS deployed on 20 November and retrieved on 4 December; WSF deployed on 22 November and retrieved on 26 November					
19 November; 23:20	(Russia) Soyuz-U		(Kazakhstan) Baikonur Site 1/5		(Russia) Roskosmos	
19 November; 23:20	(Russia) Progress M-33	Roskosmos	Low Earth (Mir)	Logistics	12 March 1997; 03:23	Partial Failure
19 November; 23:20	Failed to redock after free-flight in February–March 1997					
21 November; 20:47	(United States) Atlas IIA		(United States) Cape Canaveral LC-36A		(United States) (Russia) International Launch Services	
21 November; 20:47	(France) Hot Bird 2	Eutelsat	Geosynchronous	Communications	In orbit	Operational
=== December ===
4 December; 06:58	(United States) Delta II 7925		(United States) Cape Canaveral LC-17B		(United States) Boeing IDS	
4 December; 06:58	(United States) Mars Pathfinder	NASA	Heliocentric	Mars lander	4 July 1997; 16:57	Successful
4 December; 06:58	(United States) Sojourner	NASA	Heliocentric	Mars rover	4 July 1997; 16:57	Successful
4 December; 06:58	First Mars rover; landing site: Ares Vallis; Final contact with Sojourner received on 27 September 1997 and the mission was terminated on 10 March 1998					
11 December; 12:00	(Ukraine) Tsyklon-2		(Kazakhstan) Baikonur Site 90/20		(Russia)	
11 December; 12:00	(Russia) Kosmos 2335 (EORSAT)	MO RF	Low Earth	Reconnaissance	1 January 1999	Successful
18 December; 01:57	(United States) Atlas IIA		(United States) Cape Canaveral LC-36B		(United States) (Russia) International Launch Services	
18 December; 01:57	(United Kingdom) Inmarsat 3F3	Inmarsat	Geosynchronous	Communications	In orbit	Operational
20 December; 06:43	(Russia) Kosmos-3M		(Russia) Plesetsk Site 132/1		(Russia)	
20 December; 06:43	(Russia) Kosmos 2336 (Parus)	MO RF	Low Earth	Navigation	In orbit	Operational
20 December; 18:04	(United States) Titan IVA (404)		(United States) Vandenberg SLC-4E		(United States) Lockheed Martin	
20 December; 18:04	(United States) USA-129 (KH-12)	NRO	Low Earth	Reconnaissance	In orbit	Operational
20 December; 18:04	NRO Launch 2					
24 December; 13:50	(Russia) Soyuz-U		(Russia) Plesetsk Site 43/4		(Russia) Roskosmos	
24 December; 13:50	(Russia) Bion 11	Roskosmos	Low Earth	Biological research	7 January 1997	Successful

- ← Jan
- Feb
- Mar
- Apr
- May
- Jun
- Jul
- Aug
- Sep
- Oct
- Nov
- Dec →

== Suborbital launches ==
- ← Jan
- Feb
- Mar
- Apr
- May
- Jun
- Jul
- Aug
- Sep
- Oct
- Nov
- Dec →

Date and time (UTC)	Rocket	Flight number	Launch site		LSP	
Date and time (UTC)	Payload (⚀ = CubeSat)	Operator	Orbit	Function	Decay (UTC)	Outcome
Date and time (UTC)	Remarks					
=== January-March ===
10 January	(China) DF-21		(China) Taiyuan		(China)	
10 January			Suborbital	Missile test	10 January	Successful
27 January	(India) Prithvi II		(India) Balasore		(India) DRDO	
27 January		DRDO	Suborbital	Missile test	27 January	Successful
27 January	Maiden flight of Prithvi II missile					
11 February; 23:00	(Japan) S-310		(Japan) Uchinoura LA-K		(Japan) ISAS	
11 February; 23:00	(Japan) NTV-1	ISAS	Suborbital	Aeronomy research	11 February	Successful
11 February; 23:00	(Japan) J-I		(Japan) Tanegashima LA-N		(Japan) NASDA	
11 February; 23:00	(Japan) HYFLEX	NASDA	Suborbital	Test flight	11 February	Successful
11 February; 23:00	Only flight of J-I					
23 February; 19:17	(Canada) Black Brant IX		(United States) White Sands LC-36		(United States) NASA	
23 February; 19:17		NASA	Suborbital	Technology development	23 February	Successful
23 February; 19:44	(Canada) Black Brant IX		(United States) White Sands LC-36		(United States) NASA	
23 February; 19:44		NASA	Suborbital	Ionosphere research	23 February	Successful
2 March; 10:00	(United Kingdom) Skylark 7		(Sweden) Esrange Area S		(Germany) DLR	
2 March; 10:00	(Germany) TEXUS 34	DASA	Suborbital	Microgravity research	2 March	Successful
6 March; 03:35	(Canada) Black Brant IX		(United States) White Sands		(United States) NASA	
6 March; 03:35		NASA	Suborbital	Astronomy	6 March	Successful
6 March; 20:01	(United States) LGM-30G Minuteman III		(United States) Vandenberg LF-09		(United States) US Air Force	
6 March; 20:01	(United States) FOT GT161GM	US Air Force	Suborbital	Missile test	6 March	Successful
22 March	(United States) Hera		(United States) White Sands LC-94		(United States) US Air Force	
22 March		US Air Force	Suborbital	ABM target	22 March	Successful
22 March	(United States) THAAD		(United States) White Sands		(United States) US Air Force	
22 March		US Air Force	Suborbital	ABM Test	22 March	Successful
=== April-June ===
3 April; 15:59	(Canada) Black Brant 9CM1		(United States) White Sands LC-36		(United States) NASA	
3 April; 15:59		NASA	Suborbital	Aeronomy and microgravity research	3 April	Successful
17 April; 07:00	(Russia) RT-2PM Topol		(Russia) Plesetsk Site 158		(Russia) RVSN	
17 April; 07:00		RVSN	Suborbital	Missile test	17 April	Successful
21 April	(United States) UGM-133 Trident II		(United States) Submarine, Eastern Range		(United States) US Navy	
21 April		US Navy	Suborbital	Missile test	21 April	Successful
21 April	(United States) UGM-133 Trident II		(United States) Submarine, Eastern Range		(United States) US Navy	
21 April		US Navy	Suborbital	Missile test	21 April	Successful
3 May; 04:16	(United Kingdom) Skylark 7		(Sweden) Esrange Area S		(Germany) DLR	
3 May; 04:16	(Sweden) Maser 7	SSC	Suborbital	Microgravity research	3 May	Successful
8 May; 08:01	(United States) LGM-118 Peacekeeper		(United States) Vandenberg LF-05		(United States) US Air Force	
8 May; 08:01		US Air Force	Suborbital	Missile test	8 May	Successful
16 May	(United States) UGM-96 Trident I		(United States) Submarine, Eastern Range		(United States) US Navy	
16 May		US Navy	Suborbital	Missile test	16 May	Successful
16 May	(United States) UGM-96 Trident I		(United States) Submarine, Eastern Range		(United States) US Navy	
16 May		US Navy	Suborbital	Missile test	16 May	Successful
16 May	(United States) UGM-96 Trident I		(United States) Submarine, Eastern Range		(United States) US Navy	
16 May		US Navy	Suborbital	Missile test	16 May	Successful
16 May	(United States) UGM-96 Trident I		(United States) Submarine, Eastern Range		(United States) US Navy	
16 May		US Navy	Suborbital	Missile test	16 May	Successful
30 May; 08:01	(United States) LGM-118 Peacekeeper		(United States) Vandenberg LF-02		(United States) US Air Force	
30 May; 08:01		US Air Force	Suborbital	Missile test	30 May	Successful
4 June; 05:06	(Canada) Black Brant VIIIC		(United States) White Sands		(United States) NASA	
4 June; 05:06	(United States) XQC	NASA	Suborbital	X-ray astronomy	4 June	Successful
6 June	(Russia) UR-100N		(Kazakhstan) Baikonur		(Russia) RVSN	
6 June		RVSN	Suborbital	Missile test	6 June	Successful
6 June	(Russia) RT-2PM Topol		(Russia) Plesetsk Site 158		(Russia) RVSN	
6 June		RVSN	Suborbital	Missile test	6 June	Successful
17 June; 05:50	(Canada) Black Brant IX		(United States) White Sands LC-36		(United States) NASA	
17 June; 05:50		NASA	Suborbital	Radio astronomy	17 June	Successful
20 June; 14:40	(Canada) Black Brant IX		(United States) White Sands LC-36		(United States) NASA	
20 June; 14:40		NASA	Suborbital	Test rocket	20 June	Successful
26 June; 12:17	(United States) LGM-30G Minuteman III		(United States) Vandenberg LF-10		(United States) US Air Force	
26 June; 12:17		US Air Force	Suborbital	Missile test	26 June	Successful
26 June; 14:59	(United States) LGM-30G Minuteman III		(United States) Vandenberg LF-04		(United States) US Air Force	
26 June; 14:59		US Air Force	Suborbital	Missile test	26 June	Successful
26 June; 19:00	(Canada) Black Brant IX		(United States) White Sands LC-36		(United States) NASA	
26 June; 19:00		NASA	Suborbital	Solar observation	26 June	Successful
28 June	(Russia) R-29 Vysota		(Russia) Submarine, Sea of Okhotsk		(Russia) Russian Navy	
28 June		Russian Navy	Suborbital	Missile test	28 June	Successful
28 June	(Russia) R-29 Vysota		(Russia) Submarine, Sea of Okhotsk		(Russia) Russian Navy	
28 June		Russian Navy	Suborbital	Missile test	28 June	Successful
28 June	(Russia) R-29 Vysota		(Russia) Submarine, Sea of Okhotsk		(Russia) Russian Navy	
28 June		Russian Navy	Suborbital	Missile test	28 June	Successful
=== July-September ===
9 July	(United States) Aries		(United States) Wallops Island		(United States) US Air Force	
9 July		US Air Force	Suborbital	Tracking demonstration	9 July	Successful
14 July; 07:15	(Canada) Black Brant 9CM1		(United States) White Sands LC-36		(United States) NASA	
14 July; 07:15	(United States) NUVIEWS 1	NASA	Suborbital	Ultraviolet astronomy	14 July	Successful
15 July	(Russia) R-29 Vysota		(Russia) Submarine, Barents Sea		(Russia) Russian Navy	
15 July		Russian Navy	Suborbital	Missile test	15 July	Successful
15 July	(Russia) R-29 Vysota		(Russia) Submarine, Barents Sea		(Russia) Russian Navy	
15 July		Russian Navy	Suborbital	Missile test	15 July	Successful
15 July; 11:28	(United States) Hera		(United States) White Sands LC-94		(United States) US Air Force	
15 July; 11:28		US Air Force	Suborbital	ABM Target	15 July	Successful
15 July; 11:31	(United States) THAAD		(United States) White Sands		(United States) US Air Force	
15 July; 11:31		US Air Force	Suborbital	ABM test	15 July	Successful
15 July; 18:21	(United States) Castor 4B		(United States) Wake Island		(United States) Orbital Sciences	
15 July; 18:21		Orbital Sciences	Suborbital	Re-entry test	15 July	Successful
19 July	(United States) UGM-133 Trident II		(United States) Submarine, Eastern Range		(United States) US Navy	
19 July		US Navy	Suborbital	Missile test	19 July	Successful
19 July	(United States) UGM-133 Trident II		(United States) Submarine, Eastern Range		(United States) US Navy	
19 July		US Navy	Suborbital	Missile test	19 July	Successful
25 July	(Russia) RT-2PM Topol		(Russia) Plesetsk Site 158		(Russia) RVSN	
25 July		RVSN	Suborbital	Missile test	25 July	Successful
26 July; 09:40	(Canada) Black Brant 9CM1		(United States) White Sands LC-36		(United States) NASA	
26 July; 09:40		NASA	Suborbital	Aeronomy	26 July	Successful
12 August; 18:58	(United States) Nike Orion		(United States) White Sands		(United States) NASA	
12 August; 18:58		NASA	Suborbital	Aeronomy	12 August	Successful
20 August; 15:30	(Japan) S-310		(Japan) Uchinoura Area K		(Japan) ISAS	
20 August; 15:30	(Japan) SEEK	ISAS	Suborbital	Plasma research	20 August	Successful
20 August; 16:00	(Canada) Black Brant 9CM1		(United States) White Sands LC-36		(United States) NASA	
20 August; 16:00		NASA	Suborbital	Solar research	20 August	Successful
26 August; 14:00	(Japan) S-310		(Japan) Uchinoura Area K		(Japan) ISAS	
26 August; 14:00	(Japan) SEEK	ISAS	Suborbital	Plasma research	26 August	Successful
29 August	(Canada) Black Brant VC		(United States) Wallops Island		(United States) US Air Force	
29 August		US Air Force	Suborbital	Test rocket	29 August	Successful
31 August; 15:41	(United States) STARS II II (Polaris A3)		(United States) Barking Sands		(United States) US Air Force	
31 August; 15:41	(United States) ODES/MSX MDT-2	US Air Force	Suborbital	Target	31 August	Successful
31 August; 15:41	Target for MSX satellite observation. Apogee: 909 km (565 mi).					
11 September; 08:01	(United States) LGM-118 Peacekeeper		(United States) Vandenberg LF-05		(United States) US Air Force	
11 September; 08:01		US Air Force	Suborbital	Missile test	11 September	Successful
24 September; 22:00	(Japan) TR-1		(Japan) Tanegashima LA-T		(Japan) NASDA	
24 September; 22:00		NASDA	Suborbital	Microgravity research	24 September	Successful
27 September; 16:51	(United States) LGM-30F Minuteman II		(United States) Vandenberg LF-03		(United States) US Air force	
27 September; 16:51		US Air Force	Suborbital	Target	27 September	Successful
=== October-December ===
2 October	(United States) UGM-96 Trident I		(United States) Submarine, Eastern Range		(United States) US Navy	
2 October		US Navy	Suborbital	Missile test	2 October	Successful
3 October	(Russia) RT-2PM Topol		(Russia) Plesetsk Site 158		(Russia) RVSN	
3 October		RVSN	Suborbital	Missile test	3 October	Successful
3 October	(Russia) R-29 Vysota		(Russia) Submarine, Barents Sea		(Russia) Russian Navy	
3 October		Russian Navy	Suborbital	Missile test	3 October	Successful
9 October	(United States) Hera		(United States) White Sands LC-94		(United States) US Air Force	
9 October		US Air Force	Suborbital	ABM target	9 October	Successful
9 October	(United States) THAAD		(United States) White Sands		(United States) US Air Force	
9 October		US Air Force	Suborbital	ABM test	9 October	Successful
16 October; 10:41	(United States) LCLV		(United States) Wallops Island		(United States) US Air Force	
16 October; 10:41	(United States) Red Tigress 3	US Air Force	Suborbital	Target	16 October	Successful
16 October; 16:02	(Canada) Black Brant IX		(United States) White Sands LC-36		(United States) NASA	
16 October; 16:02		NASA	Suborbital	Technology development	16 October	Successful
21 October; 03:00	(Canada) Black Brant IX		(United States) White Sands LC-36		(United States) NASA	
21 October; 03:00		NASA	Suborbital	Astronomy	21 October	Successful
28 October	(United States) UGM-133 Trident II		(United States) Submarine, Eastern Range		(United States) US Navy	
28 October		US Navy	Suborbital	Missile test	28 October	Successful
28 October	(United States) UGM-133 Trident II		(United States) Submarine, Eastern Range		(United States) US Navy	
28 October		US Navy	Suborbital	Missile test	28 October	Successful
29 October; 03:30	(Canada) Black Brant IX		(United States) White Sands LC-36		(United States) NASA	
29 October; 03:30		NASA	Suborbital	Aeronomy	29 October	Successful
6 November; 13:06	(United States) LGM-118 Peacekeeper		(United States) Vandenberg LF-02		(United States) US Air Force	
6 November; 13:06		US Air Force	Suborbital	Missile test	6 November	Successful
9 November; 08:50	(Russia) RT-2PM Topol		(Russia) Plesetsk Site 158		(Russia) RVSN	
9 November; 08:50		RVSN	Suborbital	Missile test	9 November	Successful
13 November; 18:30	(Canada) Black Brant IX		(United States) White Sands LC-36		(United States) NASA	
13 November; 18:30	(United States) SERTS-96	NASA	Suborbital	Solar observation	13 November	Successful
17 November; 13:30	(United States) Terrier-Orion		(United States) White Sands LC-36		(United States) NASA	
17 November; 13:30		NASA	Suborbital	Test rocket	17 November	Successful
24 November; 11:05	(United Kingdom) Skylark 7		(Sweden) Esrange Area S		(Germany) DLR	
24 November; 11:05	(Germany) TEXUS 35	DASA	Suborbital	Microgravity research	24 November	Successful
29 November	(Russia) RT-2PU Topol		(Russia) Plesetsk Site 158		(Russia) RVSN	
29 November		RVSN	Suborbital	Missile test	29 November	Successful
28 December	(China) DF-21		(China) Taiyuan		(China)	
28 December			Suborbital	Missile test	28 December	Successful

- ← Jan
- Feb
- Mar
- Apr
- May
- Jun
- Jul
- Aug
- Sep
- Oct
- Nov
- Dec →

== Deep-space rendezvous ==
Date (GMT)	Spacecraft	Event	Remarks
27 June	Galileo	1st flyby of Ganymede	
6 September	Galileo	2nd flyby of Ganymede	
4 November	Galileo	1st flyby of Callisto	
19 December	Galileo	1st flyby of Europa	

== EVAs ==
Start date/time	Duration	End time	Spacecraft	Crew	Remarks
15 January; 05:35	6 hours 9 minutes	11:44	STS-72; Endeavour	(United States) Leroy Chiao (United States) Daniel T. Barry	Practiced construction techniques for the upcoming International Space Station. The activities included installing a cable tray, hooking up cables and fluid lines, handling small screws and bolts in the screw, and grappling large objects at the end of the robotic arm.
17 January; 05:40	6 hours 54 minutes	12:34	STS-72; Endeavour	(United States) Leroy Chiao (United States) Winston E. Scott	Continued testing of construction techniques with utility boxes, slidewires and a portable work stanchion attached to the robotic arm. Scott also tested the heating capabilities of his spacesuit by riding the robotic arm into a cold night zone while Endeavour's payload bay was oriented toward space.
8 February; 14:03	3 hours 5 minutes	17:08	Mir EO-20; Kvant-2	(Germany) Thomas Reiter (Russia) Yuri Gidzenko	Moved a YMK maneuvering unit from the Kvant-2 airlock and secured it on the module exterior. Then collected experiments deployed earlier on the ESEF. The team was unable to remove an antenna from Kristall when they were unable to loosen some bolts on the antenna.
15 March; 01:04	5 hours 51 minutes	06:55	Mir EO-21; Kvant-2	(Russia) Yury Onufriyenko (Russia) Yury Usachov	To improve access to the outside of the Kristall module, Onufriyenko and Usachev installed a second Strela boom on the Mir base block. Also prepared cables and connectors for the future installation of the Mir Cooperative Solar Array.
27 March; 06:34	6 hours 2 minutes	12:36	STS-76; Mir Atlantis	(United States) Michael R. Clifford (United States) Linda M. Godwin	Added four canisters of experiments, called the Mir Environmental Effects Payload (MEEP), to the outside of docking module. Also tested new tethers and foot restraints for future use on Mir and the upcoming ISS assembly. First Shuttle-Mir EVA and EVA performed from a Space Shuttle docked at a space station.
20 May; 22:50	6 hours 20 minutes	21 May; 04:10	Mir EO-21; Kvant-2	(Russia) Yury Onufriyenko (Russia) Yury Usachov	Moved the Mir Cooperative Solar Array (MCSA) from its stowage position on Kristal to a final location on Kvant-1, and prepared the array for complete deployment. Also released a balloon shaped like a large Pepsi can, and filmed it for a television commercial.
24 May; 20:47	6 hours 43 minutes	25 May; 02:30	Mir EO-21; Kvant-2	(Russia) Yury Onufriyenko (Russia) Yury Usachov	Completed deployment of the Mir Cooperative Solar Array (MCSA) on the Kvant-1 module.
30 May; 18:20	4 hours 20 minutes	22:40	Mir EO-21; Kvant-2	(Russia) Yury Onufriyenko (Russia) Yury Usachov	Installed the German made Modular Optoelectronic Multispectral Scanner (MOMS) camera to the exterior of the Priroda module. Also installed a new handrail on the exterior of Kvant-2 to aid future spacewalks.
6 June; 16:56	3 hours 34 minutes	20:30	Mir EO-21; Kvant-2	(Russia) Yury Onufriyenko (Russia) Yury Usachov	Installed two American micrometeoroid detector experiments to the exterior of Kvant-2. Also replaced a cassette for the Komza experiment of the surface of Spektr.
13 June; 12:45	5 hours 42 minutes	18:27	Mir EO-21; Kvant-2	(Russia) Yury Onufriyenko (Russia) Yury Usachov	Installed the Rapana girder to the exterior of Kvant-1 in anticipation of mounting future experiments to the girder. Also manually deployed the Travers radar on the surface of Priroda.
2 December; 15:54	5 hours 58 minutes	21:52	Mir EO-22; Kvant-2	(Russia) Valery Korzun (Russia) Aleksandr Kaleri	Successfully connected electrical cables to the solar panels on surface installed on Kvant-1.
9 December; 13:50	6 hours 38 minutes	20:28	Mir EO-22; Kvant-2	(Russia) Valery Korzun (Russia) Aleksandr Kaleri	Completed the construction of the Rapana truss structure and the installed the Kurs docking antenna. Also fixed an amateur radio antenna that had loosened.
