= 1997 in spaceflight =

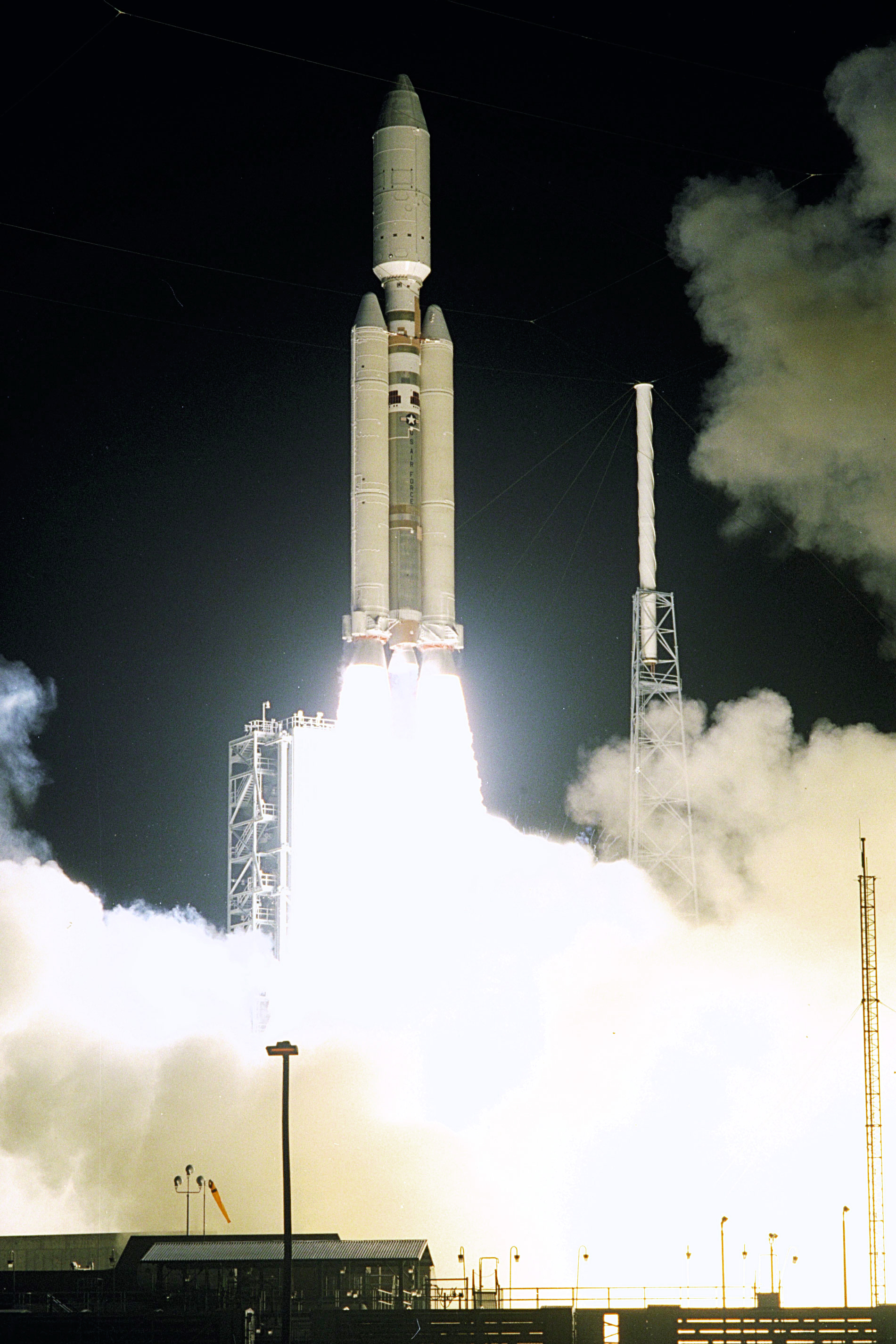
- Launch of the Cassini and Huygens spacecraft on a Titan IVB

Orbital launches
- First: 12 January
- Last: 24 December
- Total: 89
- Successes: 83
- Failures: 3
- Partial failures: 3
- Catalogued: 86

National firsts
- Satellite: Philippines

Rockets
- Maiden flights: M-V; Titan IVB; VLS-1; Taepodong-1
- Retirements: Atlas I

Crewed flights
- Orbital: 10
- Total travellers: 51

1997 in spaceflight

This article outlines notable events occurring in 1997 in spaceflight, including major launches and EVAs.

== Cassini–Huygens launch ==
Launched aboard a Titan IV-B with a Centaur D-1T upper stage on October 15, 1997, Cassini was active in space for nearly 20 years, spending almost 7 years in transit and 13 years orbiting Saturn, studying the planet and its system after entering orbit on July 1, 2004.

== Orbital launches ==
- ← Jan
- Feb
- Mar
- Apr
- May
- Jun
- Jul
- Aug
- Sep
- Oct
- Nov
- Dec →

Date and time (UTC)	Rocket	Flight number	Launch site		LSP	
Date and time (UTC)	Payload (⚀ = CubeSat)	Operator	Orbit	Function	Decay (UTC)	Outcome
Date and time (UTC)	Remarks					
=== January ===
12 January; 09:27	(United States) Space Shuttle Atlantis		(United States) Kennedy LC-39B		(United States) United Space Alliance	
12 January; 09:27	(United States) STS-81	NASA	Low Earth (Mir)	Shuttle-Mir flight	22 January; 14:23	Successful
12 January; 09:27	(United States) SpaceHab LDM	NASA/SpaceHab	Low Earth (Atlantis)	Logistics	22 January; 14:23	Successful
12 January; 09:27	Crewed orbital flight with six astronauts					
17 January; 16:28	(United States) Delta II 7925-9.5		(United States) Cape Canaveral LC-17A		(United States) Boeing IDS	
17 January; 16:28	(United States) GPS IIR-1	US Air Force	Intended: Medium Earth	Navigation	+12 seconds	Launch Failure
17 January; 16:28	SRB structural failure caused rocket to explode; First flight of GPS Block IIR satellite					
30 January; 22:04	(France) Ariane 4 (44L)		(France) Kourou ELA-2		(France) Arianespace	
30 January; 22:04	(United States) GE 2	GE Americom	Geosynchronous	Communications	In orbit	Operational
30 January; 22:04	(Argentina) Nahuel 1A	Nahuelsa	Geosynchronous	Communications	In orbit	Operational
=== February ===
10 February; 14:09	(Russia) Soyuz-U		(Kazakhstan) Baikonur Site 1/5		(Russia) Roskosmos	
10 February; 14:09	(Russia) Soyuz TM-25	Roskosmos	Low Earth (Mir)	Mir EO-23	14 August; 12:17	Successful
10 February; 14:09	Crewed orbital flight with three cosmonauts					
11 February; 08:55	(United States) Space Shuttle Discovery		(United States) Kennedy LC-39A		(United States) United Space Alliance	
11 February; 08:55	(United States) STS-82	NASA	Low Earth (HST)	Hubble Servicing Mission 2	21 February; 08:32	Successful
11 February; 08:55	Crewed orbital flight with seven astronauts					
12 February; 04:50	(Japan) M-V		(Japan) Uchinoura		(Japan) ISAS	
12 February; 04:50	(Japan) HALCA (MUSES-B)	ISAS	Medium Earth	Astronomy	In orbit	Successful
12 February; 04:50	Maiden flight of M-V; Mission concluded in November 2005					
14 February; 03:47	(Ukraine) Tsyklon-3		(Russia) Plesetsk Site 32		(Russia)	
14 February; 03:47	(Russia) Gonets-D1	Gonets SatCom	Low Earth	Communications	In orbit	Operational
14 February; 03:47	(Russia) Gonets-D1	Gonets SatCom	Low Earth	Communications	In orbit	Operational
14 February; 03:47	(Russia) Gonets-D1	Gonets SatCom	Low Earth	Communications	In orbit	Operational
14 February; 03:47	(Russia) Kosmos 2337 (Strela-3)	MO RF	Low Earth	Communications	In orbit	Operational
14 February; 03:47	(Russia) Kosmos 2338 (Strela-3)	MO RF	Low Earth	Communications	In orbit	Operational
14 February; 03:47	(Russia) Kosmos 2339 (Strela-3)	MO RF	Low Earth	Communications	In orbit	Operational
17 February; 01:42	(United States) Atlas IIAS		(United States) Cape Canaveral LC-36B		(United States) (Russia) International Launch Services	
17 February; 01:42	(Japan) JCSAT-4	JSAT	Geosynchronous	Communications	In orbit	Operational
23 February; 20:20	(United States) Titan IVB (402)/IUS		(United States) Cape Canaveral LC-40		(United States) Lockheed Martin	
23 February; 20:20	(United States) USA-130 (DSP F18)	US Air Force	Geosynchronous	Early warning	In orbit	Operational
23 February; 20:20	Maiden flight of Titan IVB					
=== March ===
1 March; 01:07	(France) Ariane 4 (44P)		(France) Kourou ELA-2		(France) Arianespace	
1 March; 01:07	(United Nations) Intelsat 801	Intelsat	Geosynchronous	Communications	In orbit	Operational
4 March; 02:00	(Russia) Start-1		(Russia) Svobodniy Site 5		(Russia)	
4 March; 02:00	(Russia) Zeya	MO RF	Low Earth	Communications	25 October 1999	Successful
8 March; 06:01	(United States) Atlas IIA		(United States) Cape Canaveral LC-36A		(United States) (Russia) International Launch Services	
8 March; 06:01	(United States) Tempo 2	TCI	Current: Graveyard; Operational: Geosynchronous	Communications	In orbit	Successful
8 March; 06:01	Suffered damage from a solar flare in April 1997 and was retired on 15 August 2006.					
=== April ===
4 April; 16:47	(United States) Titan 23G		(United States) Vandenberg SLC-4W		(United States) Lockheed Martin	
4 April; 16:47	(United States) USA-131 (DMSP 5D2 F14)	US Air Force/NOAA	Sun-synchronous	Meteorology	In orbit	Successful
4 April; 19:20	(United States) Space Shuttle Columbia		(United States) Kennedy LC-39A		(United States) United Space Alliance	
4 April; 19:20	(United States) STS-83	NASA	Low Earth	Microgravity research	8 April; 18:33	Partial Failure
4 April; 19:20	(United States) Spacelab Long Module 1	NASA	Low Earth (Columbia)	Spacelab MSL-1	8 April; 18:33	Partial Failure
4 April; 19:20	(United States) EDO Pallet	NASA	Low Earth (Columbia)	Cryogenic mission extension pallet	8 April; 18:33	Partial Failure
4 April; 19:20	Crewed orbital flight with seven astronauts Fuel cell failure caused the flight to be aborted. Re-flown as STS-94 later the same year.					
6 April; 16:04	(Russia) Soyuz-U		(Kazakhstan) Baikonur Site 1/5		(Russia) Roskosmos	
6 April; 16:04	(Russia) Progress M-34	Roskosmos	Low Earth (Mir)	Logistics	2 July; 06:31	Spacecraft failure
6 April; 16:04	Collided with Mir during rendezvous tests on 25 June, heavily damaging the station and permanently depressurizing the Spektr module.					
9 April; 08:58	(Russia) Molniya-M		(Russia) Plesetsk Site 16/2		(Russia)	
9 April; 08:58	(Russia) Kosmos 2340 (Oko)	MO RF	Molniya	Early warning	In orbit	Operational
16 April; 23:08	(France) Ariane 4 (44LP)		(France) Kourou ELA-2		(France) Arianespace	
16 April; 23:08	(Thailand) Thaicom 3	Thaicom	Geosynchronous	Communications	2 October 2006	Successful
16 April; 23:08	(Japan) BSAT-1A	BSAT	Geosynchronous	Communications	In orbit	Operational
16 April; 23:08	Thaicom 3 deorbited after suffering severe power degradation.					
17 April; 13:03	(Russia) Kosmos-3M		(Russia) Plesetsk Site 132/1		(Russia)	
17 April; 13:03	(Russia) Kosmos 2341 (Parus)	MO RF	Low Earth	Navigation	In orbit	Operational
21 April; 11:59	(United States) Pegasus-XL		(Spain) Stargazer, Gando		(United States) Orbital Sciences	
21 April; 11:59	(Spain) Minisat-01	INTA	Low Earth	Technology development	26 February 2002	Successful
21 April; 11:59	(United States) Celestis Founders	Celestis	Low Earth	Space burial	20 May 2002	Successful
25 April; 05:49	(United States) Atlas I		(United States) Cape Canaveral LC-36B		(United States) (Russia) International Launch Services	
25 April; 05:49	(United States) GOES 10 (GOES-K)	NOAA	Geosynchronous; Graveyard (after retirement)	Meteorology	In orbit	Successful
25 April; 05:49	Final flight of Atlas I, satellite retired and boosted to graveyard orbit on 1 December 2009.					
=== May ===
5 May; 14:55	(United States) Delta II (7920-10C)		(United States) Vandenberg SLC-2W		(United States) Boeing IDS	
5 May; 14:55	(United States) Iridium 8	Iridium	Low Earth	Communications	24 November 2017	Successful
5 May; 14:55	(United States) Iridium 7	Iridium	Low Earth	Communications	In orbit	Operational
5 May; 14:55	(United States) Iridium 6	Iridium	Low Earth	Communications	23 December 2017	Successful
5 May; 14:55	(United States) Iridium 5	Iridium	Low Earth	Communications	In orbit	Operational
5 May; 14:55	(United States) Iridium 4	Iridium	Low Earth	Communications	In orbit	Operational
11 May; 16:17	(China) Long March 3A		(China) Xichang LC-2		(China)	
11 May; 16:17	(China) Zhongxing-6 (Chinasat-6)	Chinasat	Geosynchronous	Communications	In orbit	Operational
14 May; 00:33	(Russia) Molniya-M		(Russia) Plesetsk Site 43/4		(Russia)	
14 May; 00:33	(Russia) Kosmos 2342 (Oko)	MO RF	Molniya	Early warning	In orbit	Operational
15 May; 08:07	(United States) Space Shuttle Atlantis		(United States) Kennedy LC-39A		(United States) United Space Alliance	
15 May; 08:07	(United States) STS-84	NASA	Low Earth (Mir)	Shuttle-Mir flight	24 May; 13:27	Successful
15 May; 08:07	(United States) SpaceHab LDM	NASA/SpaceHab	Low Earth (Atlantis)	Logistics	24 May; 13:27	Successful
15 May; 08:07	Crewed orbital flight with seven astronauts					
15 May; 12:10	(Russia) Soyuz-U		(Kazakhstan) Baikonur Site 31/6		(Russia)	
15 May; 12:10	(Russia) Kosmos 2343	MO RF	Low Earth	Reconnaissance	18 September	Successful
20 May; 07:07	(Ukraine) Zenit-2		(Kazakhstan) Baikonur Site 45/1		(Russia)	
20 May; 07:07	(Russia) Tselina-2	VKS	Intended: Low Earth	ELINT	+ 48 seconds	Launch Failure
20 May; 07:07	Stage 1 engine failure					
20 May; 22:39	(United States) Delta II 7925-9.5		(United States) Cape Canaveral LC-17A		(United States) Boeing IDS	
20 May; 22:39	(Norway) Thor-2	Telenor	Geosynchronous	Communications	In orbit	Operational
24 May; 17:00	(Russia) Proton-K/DM-2M		(Kazakhstan) Baikonur Site 81/23		(United States) (Russia) International Launch Services	
24 May; 17:00	(United States) Telstar 5	Loral Skynet	Geosynchronous	Communications	In orbit	Operational
=== June ===
3 June; 23:20	(France) Ariane 4 (44L)		(France) Kourou ELA-2		(France) Arianespace	
3 June; 23:20	(United Kingdom) Inmarsat 3F4	Inmarsat	Geosynchronous	Communications	In orbit	Operational
3 June; 23:20	(India) INSAT 2D	ISRO	Geosynchronous	Communications	In orbit	Spacecraft Failure
3 June; 23:20	Insat 2D declared a total loss on 4 October 1997.					
6 June; 16:56	(Russia) Proton-K/DM-5		(Kazakhstan) Baikonur Site 200/39		(Russia)	
6 June; 16:56	(Russia) Kosmos 2344 (Araks-N)	MO RF	Medium Earth	Reconnaissance	In orbit	Operational
10 June; 12:01	(China) Long March 3		(China) Xichang LC-1		(China)	
10 June; 12:01	(China) Feng Yun 2A	CASC	Geosynchronous	Meteorology	In orbit	Spacecraft Failure
10 June; 12:01	Halted transmitting data in April 1998, resumed transmission but imaging system failed later that year in September.					
18 June; 14:02	(Russia) Proton-K/DM2		(Kazakhstan) Baikonur Site 81/23		(Russia)	
18 June; 14:02	(United States) Iridium 14	Iridium	Low Earth	Communications	In orbit	Spacecraft Failure
18 June; 14:02	(United States) Iridium 12	Iridium	Low Earth	Communications	2 September 2018	Successful
18 June; 14:02	(United States) Iridium 9	Iridium	Low Earth	Communications	11 March 2003	Spacecraft Failure
18 June; 14:02	(United States) Iridium 10	Iridium	Low Earth	Communications	6 October 2018	Successful
18 June; 14:02	(United States) Iridium 13	Iridium	Low Earth	Communications	29 April 2018	Successful
18 June; 14:02	(United States) Iridium 16	Iridium	Low Earth	Communications	In orbit	Operational
18 June; 14:02	(United States) Iridium 11	Iridium	Low Earth	Communications	In orbit	Spacecraft Failure
25 June; 23:44	(France) Ariane 4 (44P)		(France) Kourou ELA-2		(France) Arianespace	
25 June; 23:44	(United Nations) Intelsat 802	Intelsat	Geosynchronous	Communications	In orbit	Operational
=== July ===
1 July; 18:02	(United States) Space Shuttle Columbia		(United States) Kennedy LC-39A		(United States) United Space Alliance	
1 July; 18:02	(United States) STS-94	NASA	Low Earth	Microgravity research	17 July; 10:40	Successful
1 July; 18:02	(United States) Spacelab Long Module 1	NASA	Low Earth (Columbia)	Spacelab MSL-1	17 July; 10:40	Successful
1 July; 18:02	(United States) EDO Pallet	NASA	Low Earth (Columbia)	Cryogenic mission extension pallet	17 July; 10:40	Successful
1 July; 18:02	Crewed orbital flight with seven astronauts, reflight of STS-83; Final flight of Spacelab Long Module 1					
5 July; 04:11	(Russia) Soyuz-U		(Kazakhstan) Baikonur Site 1/5		(Russia) Roskosmos	
5 July; 04:11	(Russia) Progress M-35	Roskosmos	Low Earth (Mir)	Logistics	7 October; 17:23	Successful
9 July; 13:04	(United States) Delta II 7920-10C		(United States) Vandenberg SLC-2W		(United States) Boeing IDS	
9 July; 13:04	(United States) Iridium 15	Iridium	Low Earth	Communications	14 October 2018	Successful
9 July; 13:04	(United States) Iridium 17	Iridium	Low Earth	Communications	In orbit	Operational
9 July; 13:04	(United States) Iridium 20	Iridium	Low Earth	Communications	In orbit	Spacecraft Failure
9 July; 13:04	(United States) Iridium 18	Iridium	Low Earth	Communications	19 August 2018	Successful
9 July; 13:04	(United States) Iridium 21	Iridium	Low Earth	Communications	In orbit	Spacecraft Failure
23 July; 03:42	(United States) Delta II 7925-9.5		(United States) Cape Canaveral LC-17A		(United States) Boeing IDS	
23 July; 03:42	(United States) USA-132 (GPS IIR-2)	US Air Force	Medium Earth	Navigation	In orbit	Operational
28 July; 01:15	(United States) Atlas IIAS		(United States) Cape Canaveral LC-36B		(United States) (Russia) International Launch Services	
28 July; 01:15	(Japan) Superbird C	SCC	Geosynchronous	Communications	In orbit	Operational
=== August ===
1 August; 20:20	(United States) Pegasus-XL		(United States) Stargazer, Vandenberg		(United States) Orbital Sciences	
1 August; 20:20	(United States) Orbview-2	GeoEye	Low Earth	Earth imaging	In orbit	Operational
5 August; 15:35	(Russia) Soyuz-U		(Kazakhstan) Baikonur Site 1/5		(Russia) Roskosmos	
5 August; 15:35	(Russia) Soyuz TM-26	Roskosmos	Low Earth (Mir)	Mir EO-24	19 February 1998; 09:10	Successful
5 August; 15:35	Crewed orbital flight with two cosmonauts					
7 August; 14:41	(United States) Space Shuttle Discovery		(United States) Kennedy LC-39A		(United States) United Space Alliance	
7 August; 14:41	(United States) STS-85	NASA	Low Earth	Space sciences	19 August; 11:08	Successful
7 August; 14:41	(Germany) (United States) CRISTA-SPAS-2	DLR/NASA	Low Earth	Atmospheric research	19 August; 11:08	Successful
7 August; 14:41	(Japan) MFD	NASDA	Low Earth (Discovery)	Dextrous RMS demonstration	19 August; 11:08	Successful
7 August; 14:41	Crewed orbital flight with six astronauts CRISTA-SPAS deployed 7 August and retrieved 16 August					
8 August; 06:46	(France) Ariane 4 (44LP)		(France) Kourou ELA-2		(France) Arianespace	
8 August; 06:46	(United States) PAS 6	PanAmSat	Geosynchronous	Communications	In orbit	Spacecraft Failure
8 August; 06:46	Spacecraft failure occurred in April 2004					
14 August; 20:49	(Russia) Proton-K/DM-2		(Kazakhstan) Baikonur Site 200/39		(Russia)	
14 August; 20:49	(Russia) Kosmos 2345 (Prognoz)	MO RF	Geosynchronous	Early warning	In orbit	Successful
14 August; 20:49	Retired on 1 January 1999					
19 August; 17:50	(China) Long March 3B		(China) Xichang LC-2		(China)	
19 August; 17:50	(Philippines) Agila 2	MPSC	Geosynchronous	Communications	In orbit	Operational
21 August; 00:38	(United States) Delta II 7920-10C		(United States) Vandenberg SLC-2W		(United States) Boeing IDS	
21 August; 00:38	(United States) Iridium 26	Iridium	Low Earth	Communications	In orbit	Operational
21 August; 00:38	(United States) Iridium 25	Iridium	Low Earth	Communications	14 May 2018	Successful
21 August; 00:38	(United States) Iridium 24	Iridium	Low Earth	Communications	11 May 2019	Spacecraft Failure
21 August; 00:38	(United States) Iridium 23	Iridium	Low Earth	Communications	28 March 2018	Successful
21 August; 00:38	(United States) Iridium 22	Iridium	Low Earth	Communications	In orbit	Operational
23 August; 06:51	(United States) LMLV-1 (Athena I)		(United States) Vandenberg SLC-6		(United States) Lockheed Martin	
23 August; 06:51	(United States) Lewis	NASA	Low Earth	Earth observation	29 September	Spacecraft failure
23 August; 06:51	Control lost within three days of launch due to RCS design flaw.					
25 August; 14:39	(United States) Delta II 7920-8		(United States) Cape Canaveral LC-17A		(United States) Boeing IDS	
25 August; 14:39	(United States) ACE	NASA	Earth/Sun L_{1} point	Magnetospheric research	In orbit	Operational
28 August; 00:33	(Russia) Proton-K/DM-2M		(Kazakhstan) Baikonur Site 81/23		(United States) (Russia) International Launch Services	
28 August; 00:33	(United States) PAS 5	PanAmSat	Geosynchronous	Communications	In orbit	Operational
29 August; 15:02	(United States) Pegasus-XL		(United States) Stargazer, Vandenberg		(United States) Orbital Sciences	
29 August; 15:02	(United States) FORTE	US Air Force	Low Earth	Ionosphere research	In orbit	Operational
=== September ===
1 September; 14:00	(China) Long March 2C		(China) Taiyuan LC-1		(China) CASC	
1 September; 14:00	(United States) Iridium MFS-1	Iridium	Low Earth	Boilerplate spacecraft	In orbit	Successful
1 September; 14:00	(United States) Iridium MFS-2	Iridium	Low Earth	Boilerplate spacecraft	In orbit	Successful
2 September; 22:21	(France) Ariane 4 (44LP)		(France) Kourou ELA-2		(France) Arianespace	
2 September; 22:21	(France) Hot Bird 3	Eutelsat	Geosynchronous	Communications	In orbit	Operational
2 September; 22:21	Meteosat 7	Eumetsat	Geosynchronous	Meteorology	In orbit	Operational
4 September; 12:03	(United States) Atlas IIAS		(United States) Cape Canaveral LC-36A		(United States) (Russia) International Launch Services	
4 September; 12:03	(United States) GE 3	GE Americom	Geosynchronous	Communications	In orbit	Operational
14 September; 01:36	(Russia) Proton-K/17S40		(Kazakhstan) Baikonur Site 81/23		(Russia)	
14 September; 01:36	(United States) Iridium 29	Iridium	Low Earth	Communications	In orbit	Operational
14 September; 01:36	(United States) Iridium 32	Iridium	Low Earth	Communications	10 March 2019	Successful
14 September; 01:36	(United States) Iridium 33	Iridium	Low Earth	Communications	10 February 2009	Partial Failure
14 September; 01:36	(United States) Iridium 27	Iridium	Low Earth	Communications	1 February 2002	Spacecraft Failure
14 September; 01:36	(United States) Iridium 28	Iridium	Low Earth	Communications	In orbit	Operational
14 September; 01:36	(United States) Iridium 30	Iridium	Low Earth	Communications	28 September 2017	Successful
14 September; 01:36	(United States) Iridium 31	Iridium	Low Earth	Communications	20 December 2018	Successful
14 September; 01:36	Iridium 33 destroyed in collision with Kosmos 2251					
23 September; 16:44	(Russia) Kosmos-3M		(Russia) Plesetsk Site 132/1		(Russia)	
23 September; 16:44	(Russia) Kosmos 2346 (Parus)	MO RF	Low Earth	Navigation	In orbit	Operational
23 September; 16:44	(United States) FAISAT-2V	FAI	Low Earth	Communications	In orbit	Operational
23 September; 23:58	(France) Ariane 4 (42L)		(France) Kourou ELA-2		(France) Arianespace	
23 September; 23:58	(United Nations) Intelsat 803	Intelsat	Geosynchronous	Communications	In orbit	Operational
24 September; 21:30	(Russia) Molniya-M		(Russia) Plesetsk Site 43/4		(Russia)	
24 September; 21:30	(Russia) Molniya-1T	MO RF	Molniya	Communications	In orbit	Operational
26 September; 02:34	(United States) Space Shuttle Atlantis		(United States) Kennedy LC-39A		(United States) United Space Alliance	
26 September; 02:34	(United States) STS-86	NASA	Low Earth (Mir)	Shuttle-Mir flight	6 October; 21:55	Successful
26 September; 02:34	(United States) SpaceHab LDM	NASA/SpaceHab	Low Earth (Atlantis)	Logistics	6 October; 21:55	Successful
26 September; 02:34	Crewed orbital flight with seven astronauts					
27 September; 01:23	(United States) Delta II 7920-10C		(United States) Vandenberg SLC-2W		(United States) Boeing IDS	
27 September; 01:23	(United States) Iridium 19	Iridium	Low Earth	Communications	7 April 2018	Successful
27 September; 01:23	(United States) Iridium 37	Iridium	Low Earth	Communications	26 May 2018	Successful
27 September; 01:23	(United States) Iridium 36	Iridium	Low Earth	Communications	In orbit	Operational
27 September; 01:23	(United States) Iridium 35	Iridium	Low Earth	Communications	26 December 2018	Successful
27 September; 01:23	(United States) Iridium 34	Iridium	Low Earth	Communications	8 January 2018	Successful
29 September; 04:47	(India) PSLV		(India) Sriharikota FLP		(India) ISRO	
29 September; 04:47	(India) IRS-1D	ISRO	Sun-synchronous	Remote sensing	In orbit	Operational
=== October ===
5 October; 15:08	(Russia) Soyuz-U		(Kazakhstan) Baikonur Site 1/5		(Russia) Roskosmos	
5 October; 15:08	(Russia) Progress M-36	Roskosmos	Low Earth (Mir)	Logistics	19 December; 13:20	Successful
5 October; 15:08	(Russia) Sputnik-40	Roskosmos	Low Earth	Amateur communications	21 May 1998	Successful
5 October; 15:08	(Germany) X-Mir	DASA	Low Earth (Mir)	Inspect Mir	2 October 1998	Successful
5 October; 21:01	(United States) Atlas IIAS		(United States) Cape Canaveral LC-36B		(United States) (Russia) International Launch Services	
5 October; 21:01	(United States) Echostar 3	EchoStar	Geosynchronous	Communications	In orbit	Operational
9 October; 17:59	(Russia) Soyuz-U		(Russia) Plesetsk Site 43/3		(Russia)	
9 October; 17:59	(Russia) Foton 11	Roskosmos	Low Earth	Microgravity research	23 October	Successful
15 October; 08:43	(United States) Titan IVB (401)/Centaur		(United States) Cape Canaveral LC-40		(United States) Lockheed Martin	
15 October; 08:43	(United States) Cassini	NASA	Kronocentric Orbit	Saturn orbiter	15 September 2017; 10:31	Successful
15 October; 08:43	(United States) Huygens	NASA/ESA	Kronocentric Orbit	Titan lander	14 January 2005; 12:43	Successful
15 October; 08:43	Cassini is the first spacecraft to orbit Saturn and Huygens is the first spacecraft to land on Titan. Huygens released from Cassini on 25 December 2004.					
16 October; 19:13	(China) Long March 3B		(China) Xichang LC-2		(China)	
16 October; 19:13	(China) Apstar 2R	APT	Geosynchronous	Communications	In orbit	Operational
22 October; 13:13	(United States) Pegasus-XL		(United States) Stargazer, Wallops Island		(United States) Orbital Sciences	
22 October; 13:13	(United States) STEP-4	US Air Force	Low Earth		31 March 2001	Successful
24 October; 02:32	(United States) Titan IVA (403)		(United States) Vandenberg SLC-4E		(United States) Lockheed Martin	
24 October; 02:32	(United States) USA-133 (Lacrosse 3)	NRO	Low Earth	Reconnaissance	In orbit	Operational
25 October; 00:46	(United States) Atlas IIA		(United States) Cape Canaveral LC-36A		(United States)	
25 October; 00:46	(United States) USA-135 (DSCS III F13)	US Air Force	Geosynchronous	Communications	In orbit	Operational
25 October; 00:46	(United States) FalconSat Gold	USAFA	Geosynchronous transfer	Technology demonstration	27 September 1998	Successful
30 October; 13:43	(France) Ariane 5G		(France) Kourou ELA-3		(France) Arianespace	
30 October; 13:43	MAQSAT-H	ESA	Geosynchronous transfer	Boilerplate	In orbit	Successful
30 October; 13:43	MAQSAT-B	ESA	Geosynchronous transfer	Boilerplate	In orbit	Successful
30 October; 13:43	TEAMSAT	ESTEC	Geosynchronous transfer	Technology development	In orbit	Operational
30 October; 13:43	YES	ESTEC	Geosynchronous transfer	Technolovy development	In orbit	Operational
=== November ===
2 November; 12:25	(Brazil) VLS-1	V01	(Brazil) Alcântara		(Brazil) INPE	
2 November; 12:25	(Brazil) SCD-2A	INPE	Intended: Low Earth	Weather satellite	2 November	Launch Failure
2 November; 12:25	Maiden flight of VLS-1; First Brazilian orbital launch attempt					
6 November; 00:30	(United States) Delta II 7925-9.5		(United States) Cape Canaveral LC-17A		(United States) Boeing IDS	
6 November; 00:30	(United States) USA-134 (GPS IIA-19)	US Air Force	Medium Earth	Navigation	In orbit	Operational
8 November; 02:05	(United States) Titan IVA (401)/Centaur		(United States) Cape Canaveral LC-41		(United States) Lockheed Martin	
8 November; 02:05	(United States) USA-136 (Trumpet 3)	NRO	Molniya	SIGINT	In orbit	Operational
8 November; 02:05	NRO Launch 4					
9 November; 01:34	(United States) Delta II 7920-10C		(United States) Vandenberg SLC-2W		(United States) Boeing IDS	
9 November; 01:34	(United States) Iridium 43	Iridium	Low Earth	Communications	11 February 2018	Successful
9 November; 01:34	(United States) Iridium 41	Iridium	Low Earth	Communications	28 July 2018	Successful
9 November; 01:34	(United States) Iridium 40	Iridium	Low Earth	Communications	23 September 2018	Successful
9 November; 01:34	(United States) Iridium 39	Iridium	Low Earth	Communications	In orbit	Operational
9 November; 01:34	(United States) Iridium 38	Iridium	Low Earth	Communications	In orbit	Operational
12 November; 17:00	(Russia) Proton-K/DM-2M		(Kazakhstan) Baikonur Site 200/39		(Russia)	
12 November; 17:00	(Russia) Kupon	RFCB	Geosynchronous	Communications	In orbit	Spacecraft Failure
12 November; 17:00	Onboard computer failed					
12 November; 21:48	(France) Ariane 4 (44L)		(France) Kourou ELA-2		(France) Arianespace	
12 November; 21:48	(Sweden) Sirius 2	NSAB	Geosynchronous	Communications	In orbit	Spacecraft Failure
12 November; 21:48	(Indonesia) IndoStar-1	Indostar	Geosynchronous	Communications	In orbit	Operational
12 November; 21:48	Astra 5A (Sirius 2) failed on 16 January 2009					
18 November; 11:14	(Russia) Soyuz-U		(Russia) Plesetsk		(Russia)	
18 November; 11:14	(Russia) Resurs F-1M	Roskosmos	Low Earth	Remote sensing	13 December	Successful
19 November; 19:46	(United States) Space Shuttle Columbia		(United States) Kennedy LC-39B		(United States) United Space Alliance	
19 November; 19:46	(United States) STS-87	NASA	Low Earth	Microgravity experiments	5 December; 12:20	Successful
19 November; 19:46	(United States) SPARTAN-201	NASA	Low Earth	Microgravity research	5 December; 12:20	Failure
19 November; 19:46	(United States) EDO Pallet	NASA	Low Earth (Columbia)	Cryogenic mission extension pallet	5 December; 12:20	Successful
19 November; 19:46	Crewed orbital flight with six astronauts Spartan failed to orient itself due to human error during deployment on 21 November; was retrieved on 25 November.					
27 November; 21:27	(Japan) H-II		(Japan) Tanegashima LA-Y1		(Japan)	
27 November; 21:27	(United States) TRMM	NASA	Low Earth	Environmental research	16 June 2015; 06:55	Successful
27 November; 21:27	(Japan) Hikoboshi (ETS-7)	NASDA	Low Earth	Docking test	13 November 2015	Successful
27 November; 21:27	(Japan) Orihime (ETS-7)	NASDA	Low Earth	Docking test	13 November 2015	Successful
27 November; 21:27	The two ETS satellites docked on 7 July 1998					
=== December ===
2 December; 22:52	(France) Ariane 4 (44P)		(France) Kourou ELA-2		(France) Arianespace	
2 December; 22:52	(Japan) JCSAT 5	JSAT	Geosynchronous	Communications	In orbit	Operational
2 December; 22:52	(Germany) Equator-S	DLR	Geosynchronous transfer	Magnetospheric research	In orbit	Operational
12 November; 17:00	(Russia) Proton-K/DM-2M		(Kazakhstan) Baikonur Site 81/23		(United States) (Russia) International Launch Services	
12 November; 17:00	(Luxembourg) Astra 1G	SES	Geosynchronous	Communications	In orbit	Operational
8 December; 07:16	(China) Long March 2C		(China) Taiyuan LC-1		(China) CASC	
8 December; 07:16	(United States) Iridium 42	Iridium	Low Earth	Communications	In orbit	Operational
8 December; 07:16	(United States) Iridium 44	Iridium	Low Earth	Communications	In orbit	Spacecraft Failure
8 December; 23:52	(United States) Atlas IIAS		(United States) Cape Canaveral LC-36B		(United States) (Russia) International Launch Services	
8 December; 23:52	(United States) Galaxy 8i	PanAmSat	Current: Graveyard; Operational: Geosynchronous	Communications	In orbit	Successful
8 December; 23:52	Retired in October 2002					
9 December; 07:17	(Ukraine) Tsyklon-2		(Kazakhstan) Baikonur Site 90/20		(Russia)	
9 December; 07:17	(Russia) Kosmos 2347 (EORSAT	MO RF	Low Earth	SIGINT	11 December 1999	Successful
15 December; 15:40	(Russia) Soyuz-U		(Russia) Plesetsk		(Russia)	
15 December; 15:40	(Russia) Kosmos 2348 (Yantar)	MO RF	Low Earth	Reconnaissance	14 April 1998	Successful
20 December; 08:45	(Russia) Soyuz-U		(Kazakhstan) Baikonur Site 1/5		(Russia) Roskosmos	
20 December; 08:45	(Russia) Progress M-37	Roskosmos	Low Earth (Mir)	Logistics	15 March 1998; 23:04	Successful
20 December; 13:16	(United States) Delta II 7920-10C		(United States) Vandenberg SLC-2W		(United States) Boeing IDS	
20 December; 13:16	(United States) Iridium 45	Iridium	Low Earth	Communications	In orbit	Operational
20 December; 13:16	(United States) Iridium 46	Iridium	Low Earth	Communications	In orbit	Operational
20 December; 13:16	(United States) Iridium 47	Iridium	Low Earth	Communications	1 September 2018	Successful
20 December; 13:16	(United States) Iridium 48	Iridium	Low Earth	Communications	5 May 2001	Spacecraft Failure
20 December; 13:16	(United States) Iridium 49	Iridium	Low Earth	Communications	13 February 2018	Successful
22 December; 00:16	(France) Ariane 4 (42L)		(France) Kourou ELA-2		(France) Arianespace	
22 December; 00:16	(United Nations) Intelsat 804	Intelsat	Geosynchronous	Communications	In orbit	Operational
23 December; 19:11	(United States) Pegasus-XL/HAPS		(United States) Stargazer, Wallops Island		(United States) Orbital Sciences	
23 December; 19:11	(United States) Orbcomm A1	Orbcomm	Low Earth	Communications	In orbit	Operational
23 December; 19:11	(United States) Orbcomm A2	Orbcomm	Low Earth	Communications	In orbit	Operational
23 December; 19:11	(United States) Orbcomm A3	Orbcomm	Low Earth	Communications	In orbit	Operational
23 December; 19:11	(United States) Orbcomm A4	Orbcomm	Low Earth	Communications	In orbit	Operational
23 December; 19:11	(United States) Orbcomm A5	Orbcomm	Low Earth	Communications	In orbit	Operational
23 December; 19:11	(United States) Orbcomm A6	Orbcomm	Low Earth	Communications	In orbit	Operational
23 December; 19:11	(United States) Orbcomm A7	Orbcomm	Low Earth	Communications	In orbit	Operational
23 December; 19:11	(United States) Orbcomm A8	Orbcomm	Low Earth	Communications	In orbit	Operational
24 December; 13:32	(Russia) Start-1		(Russia) Svobodniy Site 5		(Russia)	
24 December; 13:32	(United States) Early Bird 1	EarthWatch	Low Earth	Earth observation	27 July 2000	Successful
24 December; 23:19	(Russia) Proton-K/DM-2M		(Kazakhstan) Baikonur Site 81/23		(United States) (Russia) International Launch Services	
24 December; 23:19	(China) AsiaSat 3	AsiaSat	Geosynchronous	Communications	In orbit	Partial Launch Failure
24 December; 23:19	Upper stage failure; Performed lunar flyby to reduce orbital inclination and reach operational position.					

- ← Jan
- Feb
- Mar
- Apr
- May
- Jun
- Jul
- Aug
- Sep
- Oct
- Nov
- Dec →

== Suborbital launches ==
- ← Jan
- Feb
- Mar
- Apr
- May
- Jun
- Jul
- Aug
- Sep
- Oct
- Nov
- Dec →

Date and time (UTC)	Rocket	Flight number	Launch site		LSP	
Date and time (UTC)	Payload (⚀ = CubeSat)	Operator	Orbit	Function	Decay (UTC)	Outcome
Date and time (UTC)	Remarks					
=== January ===
15 January	(Russia) R-29		(Russia) Submarine, Barents Sea		(Russia) Russian Navy	
15 January		Russian Navy	Suborbital	Missile test	15 January	Successful
17 January; 01:17	(United States) LGM-30F Minuteman II		(United States) Vandenberg LF-03		(United States) US Air Force	
17 January; 01:17	(United States) IFT-1 (EKV)	US Air Force	Suborbital	ABM target	17 January	Successful
29 January	(United States) Storm-2		(United States) White Sands LC-32		(United States) Orbital Sciences	
29 January	(United States) MTTV	US Air Force	Suborbital	Target spacecraft	29 January	Failure
29 January	(United States) MTD-2	US Air Force	Suborbital	Weapons test	29 January	Failure
30 January	(United States) SR19		(United States) C-130, NAS Point Mugu		(United States) US Air Force	
30 January	(United States) AltAir (Have Gold)	US Air Force	Suborbital	Test flight	+28 seconds	Launch Failure
30 January	Accidentally destroyed by range safety					
30 January; 07:30	(Japan) S-520		(Japan) Uchinoura Pad K		(Japan) ISAS	
30 January; 07:30		ISAS	Suborbital	Technology development	30 January	Successful
30 January; 08:42	(United States) LGM-30G Minuteman III		(United States) Vandenberg LF-26		(United States) US Air Force	
30 January; 08:42	(United States) FOT GT163GB	US Air Force	Suborbital	Missile test	30 January	Successful
31 January; 01:55	(Russia) MR-12		(Russia) Kapustin Yar		(Russia) AN RF	
31 January; 01:55	(United States) Flaksus-1	APL	Suborbital	Plasma research	31 January	Successful
=== February ===
5 February; 02:16	(Russia) MR-12		(Russia) Kapustin Yar		(Russia) AN RF	
5 February; 02:16	(United States) Flaksus-2	APL	Suborbital	Plasma research	5 February	Successful
7 February	(Russia) R-17 Scud		(Marshall Islands) Bigen Island, Aur Atoll		(United States) US Air Force	
7 February	(United States) Willow Dune	US Air Force	Suborbital	Target	7 February	Successful
10 February; 05:17	(Canada) Black Brant XII		(United States) Poker Flat		(United States) NASA	
10 February; 05:17	(United States) PHAZE 2	NASA	Suborbital	Ionosphere research	10 February	Successful
10 February; 06:30	(United States) Castor-Orbus		(United States) Nevada Test Site LA-26		(United States) Sandia	
10 February; 06:30		Sandia	Suborbital	Rocket test	10 February	Successful
11 February; 08:36	(Canada) Black Brant XII		(United States) Poker Flat		(United States) NASA	
11 February; 08:36	(United States) Auroral Turbulance 2	NASA	Suborbital	Auroral/Ionosphere research	11 February	Successful
12 February; 21:00	(United States) LCLV		(United States) Wallops Island		(United States) Orbital Sciences	
12 February; 21:00	(United States) MDT IV		Suborbital	Target	12 February	Successful
20 February	(United States) UGM-96 Trident I		(United States) Submarine, Eastern Range		(United States) US Navy	
20 February		US Navy	Suborbital	Missile test	20 February	Successful
20 February	(United States) UGM-96 Trident I		(United States) Submarine, Eastern Range		(United States) US Navy	
20 February		US Navy	Suborbital	Missile test	20 February	Successful
20 February	(United States) UGM-96 Trident I		(United States) Submarine, Eastern Range		(United States) US Navy	
20 February		US Navy	Suborbital	Missile test	20 February	Successful
20 February	(United States) UGM-96 Trident I		(United States) Submarine, Eastern Range		(United States) US Navy	
20 February		US Navy	Suborbital	Missile test	20 February	Successful
22 February	(United States) Castor 4B		(United States) Wake Island		(United States) Orbital Sciences	
22 February	(United States) TCMP II		Suborbital	Re-entry vehicle test	22 February	Successful
23 February	(India) Prithvi		(India) Balasore		(India) DRDO	
23 February		DRDO	Suborbital	Missile test	23 February	Successful
23 February; 10:06	(United States) LCLV		(United States) Wallops Island		(United States) Orbital Sciences	
23 February; 10:06	(United States) MDT III		Suborbital	Target	23 February	Successful
26 February; 20:00	(Canada) Black Brant IX		(United States) White Sands		(United States) NASA	
26 February; 20:00		NASA	Suborbital	Rocket test	26 February	Successful
=== March ===
1 March	(United States) Castor 4B		(United States) Wake Island		(United States) OrbitalSciences	
1 March	(United States) TCMP II		Suborbital	Re-entry vehicle test	1 March	Successful
6 March	(United States) Hera		(United States) White Sands LC-94		(United States) US Air Force	
6 March		US Air Force	Suborbital	ABM Target	6 March	Successful
6 March	(United States) THAAD		(United States) White Sands		(United States) US Air Force	
6 March		US Air Force	Suborbital	ABM Interceptor	6 March	Successful
13 March; 10:20	(Canada) Black Brant IX		(United States) Poker Flat		(United States) NASA	
13 March; 10:20		NASA	Suborbital	Ionosphere research	13 March	Successful
18 March; 00:16	(United States) UGM-133 Trident II		(United States) Submarine, Eastern Range		(United States) US Navy	
18 March; 00:16		US Navy	Suborbital	Missile test	18 March	Successful
18 March	(United States) UGM-133 Trident II		(United States) Submarine, Eastern Range		(United States) US Navy	
18 March		US Navy	Suborbital	Missile test	18 March	Successful
19 March	(Russia) R-17 Scud		(Marshall Islands) Bigen Island, Aur Atoll		(United States) US Air Force	
19 March	(United States) Willow Dune	US Air Force	Suborbital	Target	19 March	Successful
25 March; 03:15	(Canada) Black Brant IX		(United States) White Sands LC-36		(United States) NASA	
25 March; 03:15		NASA	Suborbital	Ultraviolet astronomy	25 March	Successful
25 March; 03:15	Studied Hale-Bopp comet					
30 March; 03:25	(Canada) Black Brant IX		(United States) White Sands LC-36		(United States) NASA	
30 March; 03:25	(United States) EUVS	NASA	Suborbital	Ultraviolet astronomy	30 March	Successful
=== April ===
6 April; 03:25	(Canada) Black Brant IX		(United States) White Sands LC-36		(United States) NASA	
6 April; 03:25		NASA	Suborbital		6 April	Successful
8 April; 03:55	(Canada) Black Brant IX		(United States) White Sands LC-36		(United States) NASA	
8 April; 03:55	(United States) WISP	NASA	Suborbital	Ultraviolet astronomy	8 April	Successful
17 April	(Ukraine) R-36M		(Kazakhstan) Baikonur		(Russia) RVSN	
17 April		RVSN	Suborbital	Missile test	17 April	Successful
28 April; 16:42	(Brazil) VS-30		(Brazil) Alcântara		(Brazil) INPE	
28 April; 16:42	(Germany) AL-VS30-223	DLR	Suborbital	Test rocket	28 April	Successful
30 April	(India) RH-560/300 Mk.II		(India) Sriharikota		(India) ISRO	
30 April		ISRO	Suborbital	Test rocket	30 April	Successful
=== May ===
2 May; 07:30	(Canada) Black Brant IX		(United States) White Sands LC-36		(United States) NASA	
2 May; 07:30		NASA	Suborbital	X-ray Astronomy	2 May	Successful
8 May; 07:10	(Canada) Black Brant IX		(United States) White Sands LC-36		(United States) NASA	
8 May; 07:10		NASA	Suborbital	Astronomy	8 May	Successful
8 May; 08:01	(United States) LGM-118 Peacekeeper		(United States) Vandenberg LF-05		(United States) US Air Force	
8 May; 08:01	(United States) 9 re-entry vehicles	US Air Force	Suborbital	Missile test	8 May	Successful
15 May; 19:16	(Canada) Black Brant IX		(United States) White Sands LC-36		(United States) NASA	
15 May; 19:16	(United States) NCAR/CU-6	NASA	Suborbital	Ultraviolet astronomy/Solar observation	15 May	Successful
21 May; 08:27	(United States) LGM-30G Minuteman III		(United States) Vandenberg LF-04		(United States) US Air Force	
21 May; 08:27	(United States) FOT GT164GM/SHARP	US Air Force	Suborbital	Missile and re-entry vehicle test	21 May	Successful
23 May; 21:44	(United States) Terrier-Orion		(United States) Wallops Island		(United States) NASA	
23 May; 21:44	(United States) MSX	SMDC	Suborbital	Target	23 May	Successful
29 May; 04:56	(Canada) Black Brant IX		(United States) White Sands LC-36		(United States) NASA	
29 May; 04:56		NASA	Suborbital	Radio astronomy	29 May	Successful
30 May	(United States) UGM-133 Trident II		(United States) Submarine, Eastern Range		(United States) US Navy	
30 May		US Navy	Suborbital	Missile test	30 May	Successful
=== June ===
10 June	(Russia) UR-100NU		(Kazakhstan) Baikonur		(Russia) RVSN	
10 June		RVSN	Suborbital	Missile test	10 June	Successful
18 June; 14:02	(United States) LGM-30G Minuteman III		(United States) Vandenberg LF-10		(United States) US Air Force	
18 June; 14:02	(United States) FOT GT165GM	US Air Force	Suborbital	Missile test	18 June	Successful
24 June; 03:39	(United States) LGM-30F Minuteman II		(United States) Vandenberg LF-03		(United States) US Air Force	
24 June; 03:39	(United States) MSLS IFT-1A	US Air Force	Suborbital	ABM target	24 June	Partial Failure
24 June; 03:39	Some decoys failed to deploy					
24 June; 04:00	(United States) Payload Launch Vehicle		(Marshall Islands) Meck Island, Kwajalein		(United States) Orbital Sciences	
24 June; 04:00	(United States) IFT-1A EKV	US Air Force	Suborbital	ABM Test	24 June	Partial Failure
24 June; 04:00	Poor system performance; Non-destructive flyby					
=== July ===
8 July; 12:25	(Russia) RT-2PM Topol		(Russia) Plesetsk Site 158		(Russia) RVSN	
8 July; 12:25		RVSN	Suborbital	Missile test	8 July	Successful
9 July	(South Korea) KSR-II		(South Korea) Anhueng		(South Korea) KARI	
9 July		KARI	Suborbital	X-ray astronomy/Ionosphere research	9 July	Successful
23 July	(Russia) R-29		(Russia) Submarine, Barents Sea		(Russia) Russian Navy	
23 July		Russian Navy	Suborbital	Missile test	23 July	Successful
=== August ===
8 August; 13:19	(United States) Super Loki		(United States) Wallops Island		(United States) NASA	
8 August; 13:19		NASA	Suborbital	Aeronomy research	8 August	Successful
8 August; 13:24	(United States) Terrier-Orion		(United States) Wallops Island		(United States) NASA	
8 August; 13:24	(United States) COORS	NASA	Suborbital	Ionosphere/Aeronomy research	8 August	Failure
8 August; 16:29	(Canada) Black Brant VC		(United States) White Sands		(United States) NASA	
8 August; 16:29		NASA	Suborbital	Ionosphere/Aeronomy research	8 August	Successful
9 August; 13:29	(United States) Super Loki		(United States) Wallops Island		(United States) NASA	
9 August; 13:29		NASA	Suborbital	Aeronomy research	9 August	Successful
9 August; 22:57	(United States) Super Loki		(United States) Wallops Island		(United States) NASA	
9 August; 22:57		NASA	Suborbital	Aeronomy research	9 August	Successful
10 August; 13:36	(United States) Viper		(United States) Wallops Island		(United States) NASA	
10 August; 13:36		NASA	Suborbital	Aeronomy research	10 August	Successful
10 August; 21:30	(United States) Super Loki		(United States) Wallops Island		(United States) NASA	
10 August; 21:30		NASA	Suborbital	Aeronomy research	10 August	Successful
11 August; 13:38	(United States) Super Loki		(United States) Wallops Island		(United States) NASA	
11 August; 13:38		NASA	Suborbital	Aeronomy research	11 August	Successful
11 August; 13:43	(United States) Viper		(United States) Wallops Island		(United States) NASA	
11 August; 13:43		NASA	Suborbital	Aeronomy research	11 August	Successful
11 August; 18:18	(Canada) Black Brant IX		(United States) White Sands		(United States) NASA	
11 August; 18:18		NASA	Suborbital	Ultraviolet astronomy	11 August	Successful
11 August; 21:34	(United States) Super Loki		(United States) Wallops Island		(United States) NASA	
11 August; 21:34		NASA	Suborbital	Aeronomy research	11 August	Successful
12 August; 12:10	(United States) Super Loki		(United States) Wallops Island		(United States) NASA	
12 August; 12:10		NASA	Suborbital	Aeronomy research	12 August	Successful
12 August; 12:15	(United States) Viper		(United States) Wallops Island		(United States) NASA	
12 August; 12:15		NASA	Suborbital	Aeronomy research	12 August	Successful
12 August; 12:26	(United States) Super Loki		(United States) Wallops Island		(United States) NASA	
12 August; 12:26		NASA	Suborbital	Aeronomy research	12 August	Successful
12 August; 21:41	(United States) Super Loki		(United States) Wallops Island		(United States) NASA	
12 August; 21:41		NASA	Suborbital	Aeronomy research	12 August	Successful
13 August; 13:50	(United States) Super Loki		(United States) Wallops Island		(United States) NASA	
13 August; 13:50		NASA	Suborbital	Aeronomy research	13 August	Successful
13 August; 13:55	(United States) Super Loki		(United States) Wallops Island		(United States) NASA	
13 August; 13:55		NASA	Suborbital	Aeronomy research	13 August	Successful
13 August; 21:40	(United States) Super Loki		(United States) Wallops Island		(United States) NASA	
13 August; 21:40		NASA	Suborbital		13 August	Successful
14 August; 12:22	(United States) Super Loki		(United States) Wallops Island		(United States) NASA	
14 August; 12:22		NASA	Suborbital	Aeronomy research	14 August	Successful
14 August; 12:27	(United States) Viper		(United States) Wallops Island		(United States) NASA	
14 August; 12:27		NASA	Suborbital	Aeronomy research	14 August	Successful
14 August; 21:53	(United States) Viper		(United States) Wallops Island		(United States) NASA	
14 August; 21:53		NASA	Suborbital	Aeronomy research	14 August	Successful
15 August; 10:58	(United States) Viper		(United States) Wallops Island		(United States) NASA	
15 August; 10:58		NASA	Suborbital	Aeronomy research	15 August	Successful
15 August; 20:25	(United States) Super Loki		(United States) Wallops Island		(United States) NASA	
15 August; 20:25		NASA	Suborbital	Aeronomy research	15 August	Successful
=== September ===
2 September; 07:00	(United States) Terrier-Orion		Anna Plains		(United States) NASA	
2 September; 07:00	(United States) DUNDEE 1	NASA	Suborbital	Target	2 September	Successful
5 September; 04:00	(United States) Terrier-Orion		Anna Plains		(United States) NASA	
5 September; 04:00	(United States) DUNDEE 2	NASA	Suborbital	Target	5 September	Successful
10 September; 02:00	(United States) Terrier-Orion		Anna Plains		(United States) NASA	
10 September; 02:00	(United States) DUNDEE 3	NASA	Suborbital	Target	10 September	Successful
10 September; 14:40	(Canada) Black Brant IX		(United States) White Sands		(United States) NASA	
10 September; 14:40		NASA	Suborbital	Test rocket	10 September	Successful
10 September; 15:10	(Canada) Black Brant IX		(United States) White Sands		(United States) NASA	
10 September; 15:10		NASA	Suborbital	Microgravity research	10 September	Successful
11 September; 20:15	(United States) Terrier-Orion		Anna Plains		(United States) NASA	
11 September; 20:15	(United States) DUNDEE 4	NASA	Suborbital	Target	11 September	Successful
17 September; 08:01	(United States) LGM-118 Peacekeeper		(United States) Vandenberg LF-05		(United States) US Air Force	
17 September; 08:01	(United States) 7 re-entry vehicles	US Air Force	Suborbital	Missile test	17 September	Successful
19 September; 13:00	(Canada) Black Brant IX		(United States) White Sands		(United States) NASA	
19 September; 13:00		NASA	Suborbital	Ionosphere research	19 September	Successful
24 September	(United States) Storm-2		(United States) White Sands LC-32		(United States) US Air Force	
24 September	(United States) MTTV-4	US Air Force	Suborbital	Target	24 September	Successful
25 September; 00:30	(Japan) TR-1		(Japan) Tanegashima LA-T		NASDA	
25 September; 00:30		NASDA	Suborbital	Microgravity research	25 September	Successful
30 September; 20:10	(Canada) Black Brant IX		(United States) White Sands LC-36		(United States) NASA	
30 September; 20:10	(United States) HRTS 10	NASA	Suborbital	Solar research	30 September	Successful
=== October ===
3 October; 07:07	(Russia) RT-2PM Topol		(Russia) Plesetsk Site 158		(Russia) RVSN	
3 October; 07:07		RVSN	Suborbital	Missile test	3 October	Successful
4 October; 18:30	(United States) Castor-Orbus		(United States) Nevada Test Site LA-26		(United States) Sandia	
4 October; 18:30		Sandia	Suborbital	Test rocket	4 October	Failure
10 October	(United States) UGM-133 Trident II		(United Kingdom) Submarine, Eastern Range		(United Kingdom) Royal Navy	
10 October		Royal Navy	Suborbital	Missile test	10 October	Successful
10 October	(United States) UGM-133 Trident II		(United Kingdom) Submarine, Eastern Range		(United Kingdom) Royal Navy	
10 October		Royal Navy	Suborbital	Missile test	10 October	Successful
12 October; 16:42	(Brazil) VS-30		(Norway) Andøya		(Brazil) INPE	
12 October; 16:42	(Germany) AL-VS30-226	DLR	Suborbital	Aeronomy research	12 October	Successful
16 October; 19:00	(Canada) Black Brant IX		(United States) White Sands		(United States) NASA	
16 October; 19:00		NASA	Suborbital	Solar research	16 October	Successful
=== November ===
5 November; 20:02	(United States) Terrier-Orion		(Norway) Andøya		(United States) NASA	
5 November; 20:02	(United States) Combined Sodium and Sporadic Layers	NASA	Suborbital	Ionosphere research	5 November	Successful
5 November; 21:01	(United States) LGM-118 Peacekeeper		(United States) Vandenberg LF-02		(United States) US Air Force	
5 November; 21:01	(United States) 8 re-entry vehicles	US Air Force	Suborbital	Missile test	5 November	Successful
14 November; 05:00	(Canada) Black Brant IX		(United States) White Sands		(United States) NASA	
14 November; 05:00	(United States) SCARI	NASA	Suborbital	Ultraviolet astronomy	14 November	Successful
17 November	(United States) Hera		(United States) Fort Wingate LC-96		(United States) US Air Force	
17 November	(United States) MTV	US Air Force	Suborbital	ABM Target	17 November	Failure
18 November; 19:35	(Canada) Black Brant IX		(United States) White Sands LC-36		(United States) NASA	
18 November; 19:35	(United States) SERTS-97	NASA	Suborbital	Solar observation	18 November	Successful
19 November	(Russia) RT-23		(Russia) Nenoksa		(Russia) RVSN	
19 November		Russian Navy	Suborbital	Test rocket	19 November	Failure
=== December ===
2 December; 08:42	(Canada) Black Brant IX		(Norway) SvalRak		(United States) NASA	
2 December; 08:42		NASA	Suborbital	Plasma research	2 December	Successful
3 December; 09:06	(Canada) Black Brant IX		(Norway) SvalRak		(United States) NASA	
3 December; 09:06		NASA	Suborbital	Plasma research	3 December	Successful
18 December	(United States) UGM-133 Trident II		(United States) Submarine, Eastern Range		(United States) US Navy	
18 December		US Navy	Suborbital	Missile test	18 December	Successful

- ← Jan
- Feb
- Mar
- Apr
- May
- Jun
- Jul
- Aug
- Sep
- Oct
- Nov
- Dec →

== Deep-space rendezvous ==
Date (GMT)	Spacecraft	Event	Remarks
20 February	Galileo	2nd flyby of Europa	
5 April	Galileo	3rd flyby of Ganymede	
7 May	Galileo	4th flyby of Ganymede	
25 June	Galileo	2nd flyby of Callisto	
27 June	NEAR	Flyby of 253 Mathilde	Closest approach: 1,200 kilometres (750 mi)
4 July	Mars Pathfinder	Landed on Mars	Location: Ares Vallis; first Mars rover and rover on another planet
11 September	Mars Global Surveyor	Areocentric orbit injection	
17 September	Galileo	3rd flyby of Callisto	
6 November	Galileo	3rd flyby of Europa	
16 December	Galileo	4th flyby of Europa	

== EVAs ==
Start date/time	Duration	End time	Spacecraft	Crew	Function	Remarks
14 February; 04:34	6 hours 42 minutes	11:16	STS-82; Discovery	(United States) Mark C. Lee (United States) Steven Smith	Swapped out the Goddard High Resolution Spectrograph for the Near Infrared Camera and Multi-Object Spectrometer and replaced the Faint Object Spectrograph with the Space Telescope Imaging Spectrograph. Stowed the GHRS and FOS for return to Earth in the payload bay.	Hubble Space Telescope servicing
15 February; 03:25	7 hours 27 minutes	10:52	STS-82; Discovery	(United States) Gregory J. Harbaugh (United States) Joseph R. Tanner	Replaced a Fine Guidance Sensor and an Engineering and Science Tape Recorder with spare replacement units. Also installed the Optical Control Electronics Enhancement Kit.	Hubble Space Telescope servicing
16 February; 02:53	7 hours 11 minutes	10:04	STS-82; Discovery	(United States) Mark C. Lee (United States) Steven Smith	Replaced a Data Interface Unit with a spare unit and replaced a reel-to-reel tape drive Engineering and Science Tape Recorder with a solid-state digital version. Also replaced one of the four Reaction Wheel Assembly units that help point the telescope at targets.	Hubble Space Telescope servicing
17 February; 03:45	6 hours 34 minutes	10:19	STS-82; Discovery	(United States) Gregory J. Harbaugh (United States) Joseph R. Tanner	Replaced the Solar Array Drive Electronics package with a spare, also replaced the covers of the satellite's magnetometers. Installed thermal blankets over areas of degraded insulation.	Hubble Space Telescope servicing
18 February; 03:15	5 hours 17 minutes	08:32	STS-82; Discovery	(United States) Mark C. Lee (United States) Steven Smith	Installed more thermal insulation on three more areas that had undergone degradation.	Hubble Space Telescope servicing
29 April; 05:10	4 hours 59 minutes	10:09	Mir EO-23; Kvant-2	(Russia) Vasily Tsibliyev (United States) Jerry M. Linenger	Installed the Optical Properties Monitor on the exterior of Kristall. Used the Strela crane to move to the Kvant-2 module. At Kvant-2 they retrieved two American experiments, the Partial Impact Experiment and the Mir Sample Experiment, from the Kvant-2 hull, and installed the Benton Radiation Dosimeter on Kvant-2.	First use of the new Orlan-M space suit.
22 August; 11:14	3 hours 16 minutes	14:30	Mir EO-24; Transfer compartment of DOS-7	(Russia) Anatoly Solovyev (Russia) Pavel Vinogradov	Reconnected power cabling to the Spektr solar arrays, thus restoring part of the power lost in the collision. Although the spacewalkers were able to recover equipment and supplies from the module, they were not able to find the puncture hole.	Internal EVA to inspect the damaged Spektr module
6 September; 01:07	6 hours	07:07	Mir EO-24; Kvant-2	(Russia) Anatoly Solovyev (United Kingdom) / (United States) Michael Foale	Solovyev rode the Strela crane operated by Foale on the base block to Spektr to inspect for damage. Although an extensive documentation and search of Spektr, he was unable to find the hole. Before he returned to the airlock, Foale collected the radiation dosimeter installed outside earlier.	Foale became the first person to conduct EVAs in both American and Russian spacesuits.
1 October; 17:29	5 hours 1 minute	22:30	STS-86; Mir Atlantis	(United States) Scott E. Parazynski (Russia) Vladimir Titov	Retrieved the four Mir Environmental Effects Packages from the docking module surface. Also installed the Solar Array Cap to the docking module, to be used to plug the hole in the Spektr module on a future EVA. To close out the EVA, the spacewalkers tested the Simplified Aid For EVA Rescue jet packs.	
20 October; 09:40	6 hours 38 minutes	16:18	Mir EO-24; Transfer compartment of DOS-7	(Russia) Anatoly Solovyev (Russia) Pavel Vinogradov	Attempted to install three control cables between the solar array servo motors to the special adapter plate that seals Spektr from the rest of Mir. After cleaning up some of the debris and loose items in Spektr, Solovyev was able to connect the three cables to the servos. But even after an effort that extended into the "emergency oxygen supply" of the Orlan space suits, Solovyev was only able to connect two of the cables to the adapter plate.	Internal EVA to repair the damaged Spektr module
3 November; 03:32	6 hours 4 minutes	09:36	Mir EO-24; Kvant-2	(Russia) Anatoly Solovyev (Russia) Pavel Vinogradov	Released a minispunik (mini-satellite) into orbit. The spacewalkers then dismantled the old solar panel MSB-4 on Kvant-1. They stowed the panel on the outside of the base block.	
6 November; 00:12	6 hours 12 minutes	06:24	Mir EO-24; Kvant-2	(Russia) Anatoly Solovyev (Russia) Pavel Vinogradov	Installed a new solar array on Kvant-1 to replace the panel removed on their previous spacewalk.	
25 November; 00:02	7 hours 43 minutes	07:45	STS-87; Columbia	(United States) Winston E. Scott (Japan) Takao Doi	Captured the Spartan satellite by hand and secured it in the payload bay. Then the spacewalking team set up and tested a crane that will be used to construct the International Space Station.	Doi became the first Japanese spacewalker.
3 December; 09:09	4 hours 59 minutes	14:09	STS-87; Columbia	(United States) Winston E. Scott (Japan) Takao Doi	Conducted more testing and evaluation of the crane in the payload bay. They repeated many of the same crane motion tests with smaller objects than in the earlier EVA. During the EVA a small free-flying video camera was deployed to record the work.	
