= Progress M-35 =

Russian cargo spacecraft

- A Progress-M spacecraft
- Mission type: Mir resupply
- COSPAR ID: 1997-033A
- SATCAT no.: 24851

Spacecraft properties
- Spacecraft: Progress (No.235)
- Spacecraft type: Progress-M
- Manufacturer: RKK Energia

Start of mission
- Launch date: 5 July 1997, 04:11:54 UTC
- Rocket: Soyuz-U
- Launch site: Baikonur, Site 1/5

End of mission
- Disposal: Deorbited
- Decay date: 7 October 1997, 16:41 UTC

Orbital parameters
- Reference system: Geocentric
- Regime: Low Earth
- Perigee altitude: 188 km
- Apogee altitude: 248 km
- Inclination: 51.6°
- Period: 88.6 minutes
- Epoch: 5 July 1997

Docking with Mir
- Docking port: Kvant-1 aft
- Docking date: 7 July 1997, 05:59:24 UTC
- Undocking date: 6 August 1997, 11:46:45 UTC

Docking with Mir
- Docking port: Kvant-1 aft
- Docking date: 18 August 1997, 12:52:48 UTC
- Undocking date: 7 October 1997, 12:03:47 UTC

Progress M-35 (Russian: Прогресс M-35) was a Russian unmanned Progress cargo spacecraft, which was launched in July 1997 to resupply the Mir space station.

== Launch ==
Progress M-35 launched on 5 July 1997 from the Baikonur Cosmodrome in Kazakhstan. It used a Soyuz-U rocket.

== Docking ==
Progress M-35 docked with the aft port of the Kvant-1 module of Mir on 7 July 1997 at 05:59:24 UTC, and was undocked on 6 August 1997 at 11:46:45 UTC, to make way for Soyuz TM-26. Following a redocking of Soyuz TM-26 to the forward port of the Mir Core Module, Progress M-35 was redocked at the Kvant-1 aft port on 18 August 1997 at 12:52:48 UTC. Progress M-35 was finally undocked on 7 October 1997 at 12:03:47 UTC.

== Decay ==
It remained in orbit until 7 October 1997, when it was deorbited. The deorbit burn occurred at 16:41 UTC, with the mission ending at 17:23 UTC.

== See also ==
- 1997 in spaceflight
- List of Progress missions
- List of uncrewed spaceflights to Mir
