= Progress M-37 =

Russian cargo spacecraft

- A Progress-M spacecraft
- Mission type: Mir resupply
- COSPAR ID: 1997-081A
- SATCAT no.: 25102

Spacecraft properties
- Spacecraft: Progress (No.237)
- Spacecraft type: Progress-M
- Manufacturer: RKK Energia

Start of mission
- Launch date: 20 December 1997, 08:45:02 UTC
- Rocket: Soyuz-U
- Launch site: Baikonur, Site 1/5

End of mission
- Disposal: Deorbited
- Decay date: 15 March 1998, 22:14:30 UTC

Orbital parameters
- Reference system: Geocentric
- Regime: Low Earth
- Perigee altitude: 193 km
- Apogee altitude: 242 km
- Inclination: 51.7°
- Period: 88.6 minutes
- Epoch: 20 December 1997

Docking with Mir
- Docking port: Kvant-1 aft
- Docking date: 22 December 1997, 10:22:20 UTC
- Undocking date: 30 January 1998, 12:53 UTC

Docking with Mir
- Docking port: Kvant-1 aft
- Docking date: 23 February 1998, 10:22:20 UTC
- Undocking date: 15 March 1998, 19:16:01 UTC

Progress M-37 (Russian: Прогресс M-37) was a Russian unmanned Progress cargo spacecraft, which was launched in December 1997 to resupply the Mir space station.

== Launch ==
Progress M-37 launched on 20 December 1997 from the Baikonur Cosmodrome in Kazakhstan. It used a Soyuz-U rocket.

== Docking ==
Progress M-37 docked with the aft port of the Kvant-1 module of Mir on 22 December 1997 at 10:22:20 UTC, and was undocked on 30 January 1998 at 12:53 UTC, to make way for Soyuz TM-27. Following the redocking of Soyuz TM-27 to the forward port of the Mir Core Module, Progress M-37 was redocked to the Kvant-1 module on 23 February 1998 at 10:22:20 UTC, and finally undocked on 15 March 1998 at 19:16:01 UTC.

== Decay ==
It remained in orbit until 15 March 1998, when it was deorbited. The deorbit burn occurred at 22:14:30 UTC, with the mission ending at 23:04:00 UTC.

== See also ==
- 1997 in spaceflight
- List of Progress missions
- List of uncrewed spaceflights to Mir
