= Soyuz TM-23 =

1996 Russian crewed spaceflight to Mir

- Operator: Rosaviakosmos
- COSPAR ID: 1996-011A
- SATCAT no.: 23798
- Mission duration: 193 days, 19 hours, 7 minutes, 35 seconds
- Orbits completed: ~3,155

Spacecraft properties
- Spacecraft: Soyuz TM-23 (7K-STM No. 72)
- Spacecraft type: Soyuz-TM
- Manufacturer: RKK Energia
- Launch mass: 7,150 kilograms (15,760 lb)

Crew
- Crew size: 2 up 3 down
- Members: Yuri Onufrienko; Yury Usachov
- Landing: Claudie André-Deshays
- Callsign: Скиф (Skiph - Scythian)

Start of mission
- Launch date: February 21, 1996, 12:34:05 UTC
- Rocket: Soyuz-U
- Launch site: Baikonur Launch Pad 1

End of mission
- Landing date: September 2, 1996, 07:41:40 UTC
- Landing site: 50.28°N 70.83°E

Orbital parameters
- Reference system: Geocentric
- Regime: Low Earth
- Perigee altitude: 202 kilometres (126 mi)
- Apogee altitude: 240 kilometres (150 mi)
- Inclination: 51.6 degrees

Docking with Mir
- Docking date: 23 February 1996, 14:20:35 UTC
- Undocking date: 2 September 1996, 4:20:00 UTC
- Time docked: 191.5 days
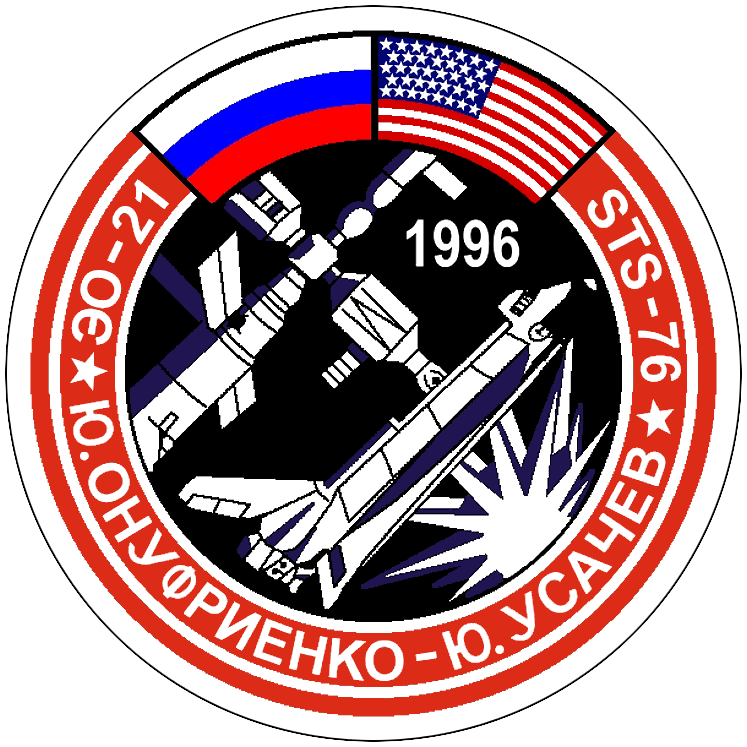
- Soyuz programme (Crewed missions)

Soyuz TM-23 was a Soyuz spaceflight which launched on February 21, 1996, to Mir. The spacecraft launched from Baikonur Cosmodrome, and after two days of flight, Yuri Onufrienko and Yury Usachov docked with Mir and became the 21st resident crew of the Station. On September 2, 1996, after 191 days docked with Mir, the ship undocked with the launch crew and Claudie André-Deshays onboard, before eventually landing 107 km (66 mi) south west of Akmola, Kazakhstan.

== Crew ==
Position	Launching crew	Landing crew
Commander	Yuri Onufrienko; First spaceflight	
Flight engineer	Yury Usachov; Second spaceflight	
Research cosmonaut	None	Claudie André-Deshays, CNES; First spaceflight

== Highlights ==
Onufrienko and Usachev began their mission without a third crew member. American astronaut Shannon Lucid would join them in late March 1996 during STS-76 and depart the Mir 20 mission in September 1996 with STS-79.

== Mir Principal Expedition 21 ==
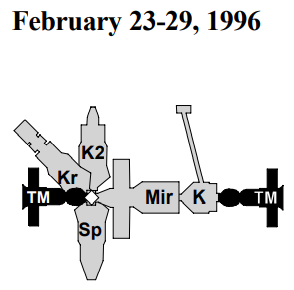
Mir February 23–29, 1996

=== February 1996 – Mir 21 begins ===
==== Progress M-30 Undocked and Soyuz TM-23 Launched ====
On February 21, Soyuz TM-23 launched from Baikonur Cosmodrome with the cosmonauts for Mir Principle Expedition 21. To clear a docking port for the Soyuz TM-23, the Progress M-30 was undocked on February 22 and re-entered over the Pacific Ocean. The Soyuz docked on February 23 at the +X docking port on the rear of the Kvant module. An hour and a half after docking, the hatches opened and the Soyuz TM-23 crew were greeted by Yuri Gidzenko, Sergei Avdeyev and Thomas Reiter, members of Mir Principle Expedition 20 and Euromir 95. This began a week of joint operations where Mir 20 handed the station over to Mir 21, including familiarization with the current conditions of the projects and the station itself. Two days before the return flight, a water leak appeared in the Mir base block, but the cosmonauts were able to repair it.

==== Mir 20/Euromir 95 mission ends ====
Gidzenko, Avdeyev and Reiter donned their Sokol launch and reentry suits and entered the Soyuz TM-22 on February 29, 1996. They landed safely about 105 km from Arkalyk. Their mission lasted 179 days, 1 hour and 42 minutes. Reiter then held the record for spaceflight duration by a Western European.

=== March 1996 – Atlantis visits Mir for the third time ===
==== First EVA for Mir 21 ====
On March 15, Onufrienko and Usachev exited the Kvant 2 EVA hatch for their first space walk. Because the existing Strela could not be used to reach the Kristall module in its current location, they installed a second Strela boom on the Mir base block, on the side opposite the Strela already in place. In the 5-hour, 51-minute EVA, they also prepared cables and electrical connectors on the surface of the Kvant module for the May installation of the Mir Cooperative Solar Array. The array was stored on the surface of the Docking Module that was installed on Kristall last November.

==== Atlantis launched ====
The U.S. Space Shuttle Orbiter Atlantis was launched from Kennedy Space Center on March 22 at 11:00 UTC for its sixteenth flight as STS-76. During the ascent phase, flight controllers detected a small leak in one of Atlantis's three redundant hydraulic systems, but after the system was shut off when Atlantis reached orbit, the leak stopped. The approximately 20% loss of that one system's hydraulic fluid would not adversely affect the mission because the hydraulic system would not be used again until the descent phase.

==== Preparations for docking ====
During the first two days of the mission, Atlantis Commander Kevin Chilton and Pilot Richard Searfoss began jet firings to guide Atlantis's journey toward Mir. The crew prepared for the docking by checking out communications equipment and docking and alignment aids. They also activated Spacehab and began orbital operations for Biorack experiments. Mission Specialists Linda Godwin and Michael Clifford checked out the space suits and equipment for their upcoming EVA.

==== Atlantis approaches Mir ====
On mission day 3, when Atlantis was within 8 miles of the station, Chilton fired the orbital maneuvering system engines in the terminal phase initiation burn. As the two spacecraft completed another orbit, Atlantis approached Mir from below along the R-bar, using rendezvous radar to track its approach rate and measure its distance.

==== Third Atlantis/Mir Docking ====
Chilton took manual control at one-half mile below the Mir, executing a 180 degree yaw rotation to align Atlantis with the Docking Module on Kristall. He used the ODS centerline camera as an aid in refining and maintaining the alignment. At 12:34 UTC on March 24, he achieved contact, adding Atlantis to a space station complex that then totaled 230 tons. After confirmation of docking, leak checks and pressurization of the docking vestibule, the hatches were opened and the two crews greeted each other. Shortly afterward, the Atlantis crew installed ducts to aid in circulating air between the two spacecraft during the docking phase.

==== Lucid joins the Mir 21 crew ====
Shannon Lucid officially became a Mir 21 crew member at 12:30 UTC on March 24 after a joint "go" from the Russian and U.S. mission control centers. She became the first in a planned continuous U.S. astronaut presence on Mir until 1998.

==== New supplies brought up on Atlantis ====
In the joint portion of the mission, the two crews loaded into the station more than 1 ton of U.S. science equipment, almost 2 tons of Russian supplies and 15 containers of water totaling about 1.5 tons. Approximately a ton of excess equipment, waste and science payload was transferred from Mir to Atlantis. From their vantage point in orbit, the crews were treated to a good view of the comet Hyakutake. Some of the spacecraft hardware items brought up by Atlantis were replacement gyrodyne, a seat liner kit for Lucid to be placed in a Soyuz module if emergency return to Earth was required and three Russian storage batteries which had been replenished on Earth.

==== Experiment Supplies ====
Some of the new supplies and equipment for onboard experiments included replacement hardware for the Mir glovebox stowage experiments, Mir electric field characterization hardware to measure radio interference inside and around the complex, and a liquid phase sintering experiment that would use the Optizon furnace to bond different metals.

==== Spacehab module work ====
On flight days 4, 5 and 7, the crew worked on the Biorack in the Spacehab module in the Orbiter payload bay. The Biorack contained eleven experiments to investigate the effects of microgravity and cosmic radiation on plants, animal tissues, bacteria, and insects. The various experiments were designed by France, Germany, the U.S., Switzerland and the Netherlands.

==== Pre-EVA procedures ====
In preparation for the EVA, Atlantis's cabin air pressure was lowered from 14.7 to 10.2 psia. the hatches were closed between Mir and Atlantis and Atlantis and Spacehab throughout the EVA to allow for sustained cabin depressurization. The Mir crew, including Lucid, stayed inside Mir and the Atlantis crew stayied inside the Orbiter cabin, with Ronald Sega coordinating the space walk activities from inside.

==== SAFER backpacks worn ====
Attached to their regular portable life support system backpack, Godwin and Clifford donned new self-contained backpacks with propulsion systems to allow enough free-flight capability to return an un-tethered astronaut to the spacecraft in an emergency. The device, called the Simplified Aid for EVA Rescue (SAFER), was designed for EVAs on docked vehicles which would be unable to quickly retrieve a drifting spacewalker. The backpack was test-flown on STS-64 in September 1994.

==== First EVA by U.S. astronauts at Mir ====
On March 27, Godwin and Clifford performed their 6-hour EVA in Atlantis' cargo bay and on the exterior of the Mir Docking Module. Their major task was to secure four experiment canisters to handrails on the docking Module. The experiments, collectively called the Mir Environmental Effects Payload (MEEP), were designed to record data on orbital debris, and to test potential International Space Station materials by exposing them to the low Earth orbit environment. The four passive experiment canisters would be retrieved by a later STS crew after almost 2 years of data collection. During their work on the Docking Module, the astronauts also evaluated new tether hooks and foot restraints that could be used on both Mir and Shuttle Orbiter exteriors, prototypes of International Space Station EVA equipment. They also retrieved the Mir-mounted camera that had been used in docking alignment during STS-74 in November 1995.

==== Atlantis leaves Mir again ====
The STS-76 and Mir 21 crews bid each other farewell on the morning of March 28. They closed the hatches to their spacecraft, and the astronauts began preparations for undocking and return to Earth. With the steering jets to both spacecraft shut down, Atlantis separated from the Mir Docking Module. Then Chilton reactivated the jets and slowly moved away from Mir. At 600 feet out, he began a fly-around, circled the station twice while the crews took pictures of each other's spacecraft, then moved to another orbit.

=== April 1996 – a new module for Mir ===
==== Mir 21 continues with full crew ====
The daily flight plan, or cyclogram, for the Russian-U.S. crew was provided 4 days ahead of schedule by TsUP. A group of NASA science experts in Moscow served as consultants on science activities. The first week after Atlantis' departure, the crew focused on the Optizon Liquid Phase Sintering Experiment (OLiPSE), processing 70 samples of different metals at high temperatures. The crew also conducted life sciences research and Earth observation photography. Space Acceleration Measurement System (SAMS) monitors were placed throughout the station to record movement that might disrupt experiments. Radiation dosimeters in various locations provided another measurement of the station's internal environment. A leak in a coolant loop in the core module was detected in mid-April, but the crew was unable to find the exact location. That loop was turned off and the alternate loop was used.

==== The Priroda Module ====
The long-awaited launch of Priroda, earlier announced for March 10 so that the module would be in place when Lucid arrived at Mir, had been moved forward at least twice: once because of late delivery from the Khrunichev factory and once because a commercial Proton launch in early April took precedence. But on April 23, Priroda was launched from Baikonur atop a SL-13 Proton rocket for a three-day orbital trip to Mir. One of the two battery-powered electrical systems on the spacecraft dropped off-line, eliminating the backup power source for the automatic docking system. If the primary electrical system had also malfunctioned, the Mir crew would have immediately initiated a manual docking.

The Priroda module had a mass of 19.700 kg, a length of ~12 m, a max diameter of ~4.35m and a pressurized volume of ~66 cubic meters. it was the last of the six permanent habitable Mir modules. Priroda was, like Spektr, designed by RKK Energia in the mid- to late-1980s and was built and assembled in the Khrunichev plant between 1989 and 1991. The module's two propulsion systems included one for orbit correction during the flight to Mir and rendezvous with Mir and one was for berthing and stabilization during the docking phase. The Priroda module included an unpressurized instrument compartment and an instrument/payload compartment.

The Kurs automatic docking system on Priroda worked flawlessly, as did the electrical system. No problems were encountered on the April 26 docking of the new module at the -X port at the front of the Mir base block.

On April 27, from inside the station, the Mir 21 crew controlled Priroda's repositioning with the Lyappa arm to the +Z docking port, directly across from the Kristall module. Thus the Mir complex, with its six habitable modules and Docking Module, attained its final basic configuration. Henceforth, the shape of the complex would change only temporarily, with dockings by Progress, Soyuz and Space Shuttle Orbiter spacecraft.

Because of concern about possible sulfur dioxide leaks from the malfunctioning battery system, a test of the modules' atmosphere was made before the crew entered. Once inside Priroda, the crew's first task was to unbolt the batteries, cap their connectors and place them in plastic bags. The 168 batteries would later be placed in Progress M-31 for disposal. The crew then connected Mir power sources to the Priroda systems and troubleshot the battery problems.

=== May 1996 – Progress M-31 resupply and EVAs ===
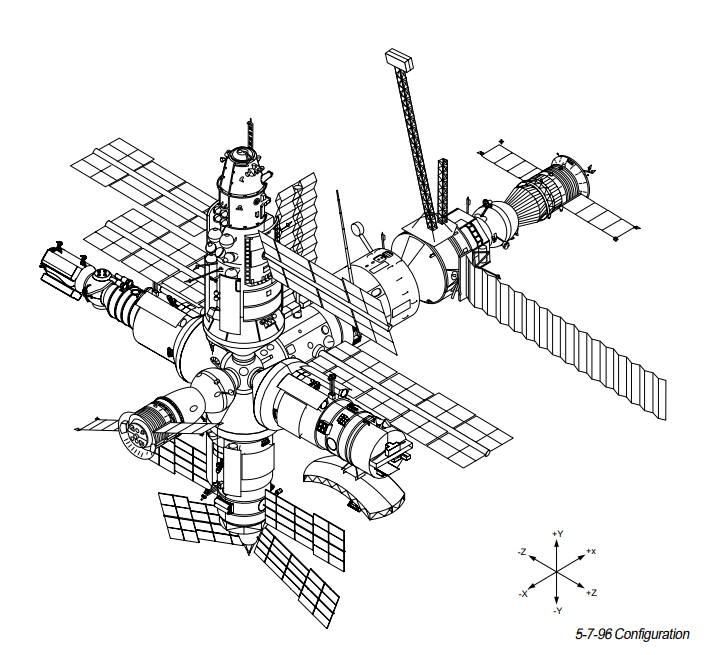
Mir complex on May 7, 1996. Note Soyuz TM-23 on the -X port.

==== Progress M-31 brings new supplies ====
A new Progress cargo spacecraft was launched from Baiknour on May 5 and docked under control of the Kurs automatic system at the -X port of the Mir on May 7. For the first time in the station's history, all ports of the base block were occupied at the same time. The crew began unloading the vehicle that week, in addition to continuing their science experiments and Priroda activation. They successfully tested the new Mir interface-to-payload systems (MIPS) hardware for downlinking data to the ground and replaced three nickel-cadmium batteries in the Priroda power system. However, a power controller for the system failed, and ground controllers began monitoring and controlling battery charging. The crew finally isolated the coolant loop leak in the core module, but there was no health risk associated with the leak and repair was not immediately scheduled.

==== Cooperative solar array installed over 2 EVAs ====
Onufrienko and Usachev left the station early on May 20 to remove the Mir Cooperative Solar Array from its stowed position on the exterior of the Docking Module at the base of Kristall. They used the new Strela boom installed during their March 15 EVA to reach the array and move it to the Kvant module, where they positioned its cables in preparation for final installation during their next EVA. During the five-hour and 20-minute EVA, they inflated an aluminum and nylon model of a Pepsi Cola can, which they filmed against the backdrop of Earth. The soft drink company paid for the procedure and planned to use it in a television commercial. On May 25, in their third spacewalk of the mission, the cosmonauts were outside the station for five hours and 43 minutes, completing the solar array installation on Kvant. After all connections were made, the array unfurled upon command from inside the station.

==== Mir 21 crew greets STS-77 crew ====
All the crew members exchanged greetings with the astronauts aboard the Space Shuttle Endeavour on STS-77 and they held a conference with U.S. and Russian news media.

==== Camera Installed on Priroda Exterior During Fourth Mir 21 EVA ====
On May 30, Onufrienko and Usachev installed the Modular Optoelectronic Multispectral Scanner (MOMS), a German remote sensing camera, on the Priroda module. The camera, designed to collect Earth atmosphere and environment data, had been flown earlier on two Shuttle missions, STS-7 in June 1983 and STS-41B in February 1984. After the installation, Lucid activated the system by remote command from inside the station. During the five-hour EVA, the cosmonauts also installed a new handrail on the Kvant-2 to facilitate movements in future spacewalks.

=== June 1996 – EVAs and science ===
==== More experiments Installed during fifth EVA ====
The Particle Impact Experiment and the Mir Sample Return Experiment, U.S. space science experiments brought to orbit inside Priroda, were installed on the exterior of the Kvant 2 module during a June 6 EVA lasing about 3 and a half hours. The cosmonauts also replaced a cassette in the Komza experiment on the surface of Spektr.

==== Rapana Girder assembled on Kvant in the sixth EVA ====
On June 13, the cosmonauts spent over five hours outside Mir, installing and deploying a Rapana girder on the surface of the Kvant module as a platform for installing future experiments on the station exterior. The 5 meter structure was deployed in four sections. Another activity during this EVA was manual deployment of the Travers radar antenna on the exterior of Priroda. The large antenna had failed to deploy fully by command from inside the station.

==== Science work continued ====
In addition to assisting the cosmonauts during EVAs from inside the station, Lucid continued activating equipment, such as the Biotechnology System Facility for long-term biotechnology studies and conducting experiments such as the Humoral Immunity experiment to study spaceflight effects on the human immune system. The crew also monitored various aspects of the spacecraft environment. They took air samples in Spektr and the core module using the Solid Sorbent Air Sampler (SSAS) and the Grab Sample Container (GSC). They recorded effects of spacecraft motion with the SAMS equipment and began evaluation of the Microgravity Isolation Mount (MIM).

=== July 1996 – Greenhouse work and a new U.S. record ===
==== Fourth shuttle docking with Mir delayed ====
On July 12, NASA announced the decision to postpone the July 31 launch of STS-79, the fourth mission Atlantis would dock with Mir, until mid-September. In a post-flight discovery of STS-78, it was found that hot gas had seeped into the joints of the boosters used in STS-78 launch in June. An investigation found that the most probable cause of the leakage was use of a new adhesive and cleaning fluid that was also used on the boosters for STS-79. Although the boosters were judged safe to fly, a decision was made to replace them in order to further study the J-joint failure and improve the safety margin of the joint.

==== U.S. record surpassed ====
On July 15, Lucid surpassed the space duration record for a U.S. astronaut set by Norm Thagard with his 115 days on Mir Principal Expedition 18 in 1996. With the delay to STS-79, her flight record would be even longer than anticipated.

==== Greenhouse work ====
The crew assembled the Svet facility for the Fundamental Biology Greenhouse plant experiment during the latter part of July. A temporary limitation of power in Kristall caused a delay in the first planting, but was solved when ground planners instructed the crew to plug an extension cord into the Spektr's power supply. Station maintenance during the last week of July included replacement of a vacuum valve assembly on the carbon dioxide removal system. On July 26, the crew activated the backup oxygen system on August 1.

=== August 1996 - Progress Swap, Experiments and New Arrivals ===
==== Progress M-31 departs and Progress M-32 arrives ====
On August 1 at 16:45 UTC, Progress M-31 left the -X port for destructive reentry into the Earth's atmosphere. Launched on July 31 with fresh supplies and hardware for the upcoming Cassiopee mission experiments, Progress M-32 docked at the -X port on August 2.

==== Gyrodynes refurbished ====
The Mir 21 crew began setting up experiments for the upcoming mission. They also refurbished the gyrodyne system, maintaining station attitude by thruster firings from August 5 through the 7th while the gyrodynes were not available.

==== August experimental work ====
The seeds of the first crop of dwarf wheat were planted in the Greenhouse on August 5. Earth observations were made of areas of the United States, Europe and Asia. Lucid continued to run experiments, including the Queen's University Experiment in Liquid Diffusion (QUELD), using a furnace to analyze the formation of alloys in space, the Candle Flame in Microgravity (CFM), to study the physiochemical processes of combustion, the Anticipatory Postural Activity (POSA), to measure how muscles work in microgravity, the Forced Flow Framespread test to examine the flame-spreading properties of solid fuels, the Solid Sorbent Air Sampler for Volatile Organic Compounds to evaluation the Mir environment and provided data for the development of advanced life support systems and the Tissue Equivalent Proportional Counter (TEPC), a radiation-dosage measurement device.

==== Mir 22 crew arrives ====
On August 17, Soyuz TM-24 was launched from Baikonur with the new crew for Mir Principal Expedition 22. To free the -X port for docking of the approaching Soyuz, Progress M-32 was undocked on August 18 under automatic control and moved to a parking orbit. It would remain until the departure of Soyuz TM-23 with the homeward-bound Mir 21 crew on September 2. The Soyuz TM-24 docked at the -X port on August 19. The new arrivals were Commander Valery Korzun, Flight engineer Alexander Kaleri and Cosmonaut Researcher Claudie Andre-Deshays of the French Space Agency (CNES). Andre-Deshays accompanied the Mir 22 crew for a 2-week program of a set of scientific investigations collectively called Cassiopee. She would return to Earth with the Mir 21 crew.

==== Cassiopee mission ====
Andre-Deshays, Korzun and Kaleri worked on PHYSIOLAB, a study of cardiovascular physiology, COGNILAB, tests of neurosensory system responses in microgravity, FERTILE, egg-based studies to determine the role of gravity on embryonic development, ALICE II, experiments in fluid dynamics and CASTOR, analyses of structural dynamics.

=== September 1996 – Mir 21 heads home aboard Soyuz TM-23 ===
Onufrienko, Usachev and Andre-Deshays departed Mir on September 2 in the Soyuz TM-23 spacecraft and safely landed in Central Asia. Onufrienko and Usachev had been in space 194 days, Andre-Deshays 17 days.
