= Progress M-32 =

Russian cargo spacecraft

- A Progress-M spacecraft
- Mission type: Mir resupply
- COSPAR ID: 1996-043A
- SATCAT no.: 24071

Spacecraft properties
- Spacecraft: Progress (No.232)
- Spacecraft type: Progress-M
- Manufacturer: RKK Energia

Start of mission
- Launch date: 31 July 1996, 20:00:06 UTC
- Rocket: Soyuz-U
- Launch site: Baikonur, Site 1/5

End of mission
- Disposal: Deorbited
- Decay date: 20 November 1996, 22:42:25 UTC

Orbital parameters
- Reference system: Geocentric
- Regime: Low Earth
- Perigee altitude: 186 km
- Apogee altitude: 229 km
- Inclination: 51.6°
- Period: 88.6 minutes
- Epoch: 31 July 1996

Docking with Mir
- Docking port: Mir Core Module forward
- Docking date: 2 August 1996, 22:03:40 UTC
- Undocking date: 18 August 1996, 09:33:45 UTC

Docking with Mir
- Docking port: Kvant-1 aft
- Docking date: 3 September 1996, 09:35:00 UTC
- Undocking date: 20 November 1996, 19:51:20 UTC

Progress M-32 (Russian: Прогресс M-32) was a Russian unmanned Progress cargo spacecraft, which was launched in July 1996 to resupply the Mir space station.

== Launch ==
Progress M-32 launched on 31 July 1996 from the Baikonur Cosmodrome in Kazakhstan. It used a Soyuz-U rocket. The launch was postponed several times, primarily following problems with quality control during Soyuz-U production.

== Docking ==
Progress M-32 docked with the forward port of the Mir Core Module on 2 August 1996 at 22:03:40 UTC, and was undocked on 18 August 1996 at 09:33:45 UTC to make way for Soyuz TM-24. On 3 September 1996 at 09:35:00 UTC, Progress M-32 was redocked at the aft port of the Kvant-1 module of Mir, following the departure of Soyuz TM-23. Progress M-32 was finally undocked on 20 November 1996 at 19:51:20 UTC.

== Decay ==
It remained in orbit until 20 November 1996, when it was deorbited. The deorbit burn occurred at 22:42:25 UTC.

== See also ==
- 1996 in spaceflight
- List of Progress missions
- List of uncrewed spaceflights to Mir
