= Progress M-33 =

Russian cargo spacecraft

- A Progress-M spacecraft
- Mission type: Mir resupply
- COSPAR ID: 1996-066A
- SATCAT no.: 24633

Spacecraft properties
- Spacecraft: Progress (No.233)
- Spacecraft type: Progress-M
- Manufacturer: RKK Energia

Start of mission
- Launch date: 19 November 1996, 23:20:38 UTC
- Rocket: Soyuz-U
- Launch site: Baikonur, Site 1/5

End of mission
- Disposal: Deorbited
- Decay date: 12 March 1997, 03:23:37 UTC

Orbital parameters
- Reference system: Geocentric
- Regime: Low Earth
- Perigee altitude: 197 km
- Apogee altitude: 242 km
- Inclination: 51.7°
- Period: 88.6 minutes
- Epoch: 19 November 1996

Docking with Mir
- Docking port: Kvant-1 aft
- Docking date: 22 November 1996, 01:01:30 UTC
- Undocking date: 6 February 1997, 12:13:53 UTC

Progress M-33 (Russian: Прогресс M-33) was a Russian unmanned Progress cargo spacecraft, which was launched in November 1996 to resupply the Mir space station.

== Launch ==
Progress M-33 launched on 19 November 1996 from the Baikonur Cosmodrome in Kazakhstan. It used a Soyuz-U rocket.

== Docking ==
Progress M-33 docked with the aft port of the Kvant-1 module of Mir on 22 November 1996 at 01:01:30 UTC, and was undocked on 6 February 1997 at 12:13:53 UTC. An unsuccessful redocking attempt was made on 4 March 1997 at 07:41 UTC.

== Decay ==
It remained in orbit until 12 March 1997, when it was deorbited. The deorbit burn occurred at 02:35:00 UTC, with the mission ending at 03:23:37 UTC.

== See also ==
- 1996 in spaceflight
- List of Progress missions
- List of uncrewed spaceflights to Mir
