= Progress M-31 =

Russian cargo spacecraft

- A Progress-M spacecraft
- Mission type: Mir resupply
- COSPAR ID: 1996-028A
- SATCAT no.: 23860

Spacecraft properties
- Spacecraft: Progress (No.231)
- Spacecraft type: Progress-M
- Manufacturer: RKK Energia

Start of mission
- Launch date: 5 May 1996, 07:04:18 UTC
- Rocket: Soyuz-U
- Launch site: Baikonur, Site 1/5

End of mission
- Disposal: Deorbited
- Decay date: 1 August 1996, 20:33:03 UTC

Orbital parameters
- Reference system: Geocentric
- Regime: Low Earth
- Perigee altitude: 186 km
- Apogee altitude: 227 km
- Inclination: 51.6°
- Period: 88.6 minutes
- Epoch: 5 May 1996

Docking with Mir
- Docking port: Mir Core Module forward
- Docking date: 7 May 1996, 08:54:19 UTC
- Undocking date: 1 August 1996, 16:44:54 UTC

Progress M-31 (Russian: Прогресс M-31) was a Russian unmanned Progress cargo spacecraft, which was launched in May 1996 to resupply the Mir space station.

== Launch ==
Progress M-31 launched on 5 May 1996 from the Baikonur Cosmodrome in Kazakhstan. It used a Soyuz-U rocket.

== Docking ==
Progress M-31 docked with the forward port of the Mir Core Module on 7 May 1996 at 08:54:19 UTC, and was undocked on 1 August 1996 at 16:44:54 UTC.

== Decay ==
It remained in orbit until 1 August 1996, when it was deorbited. The deorbit burn occurred at 19:44:30 UTC and the mission ended at 20:33:03 UTC.

== See also ==
- 1996 in spaceflight
- List of Progress missions
- List of uncrewed spaceflights to Mir
