= Castor-Orbus =

American sounding rocket

- Function: Sounding rocket
- Manufacturer: Orbital Sciences Corporation
- Country of origin: United States

Size
- Height: 16m
- Diameter: 1.02m
- Mass: 13.5 tons

Capacity

Payload to {{{to}}}

Associated rockets
- Family: Castor 4
- Derivative work: Castor-Orbus 1

Launch history
- Status: Retired
- Launch sites: Wake Island, Nevada Test Site
- Total launches: 3
- Success(es): 2
- Failure(s): 1
- First flight: October 16, 1992
- Last flight: October 4, 1997

stage

The Castor-Orbus was a sounding rocket (research rocket designed to take measurements and perform scientific experiments during its flight) that was developed in 1992 by the Orbital Sciences Corporation (OSC) (United States). Launched three times in its five-year-long career from 1992 to 1997, the Castor-Orbus rocket launched successfully only once. It was first launched on October 16, 1992, while its final launch took place on October 4, 1997.

There were two Castor-Orbus models made, Castor-Orbus and Castor-Orbus 1.

== Advanced details ==
Weighing 13.5 tons (13,500 kilograms), the Castor-Orbus had a lift-off thrust of approximately 430 kilonewtons (equivalent to around 96,660 lbf). The rocket had a core diameter measuring 1.02 metres (3.34 feet), with a total length of exactly 16 metres (52 ft). It had an apsis (apogee) of over 500 kilometres (310 mi). Castor 4A, a straight nozzle version of the same motor used for the Delta launch vehicle built by Thiokol Corp, was the first stage. Second stage consisted of a United Technologies Corp Orbus 1 rocket motor. Thus the pairing of the Castor-Orbus motors for the BP-TLV and BP-1M.

== Career ==
The Castor-Orbus rocket was launched three times over almost five years. After the launch of October 4, 1997, the Castor-Orbus was dropped from service.

- The first launch of the Castor-Orbus took place on October 16, 1992, at around 6:30 am. The location of the launch was Wake Island, in the North Pacific Ocean. This launch proved to be a failure. Despite the stage 2 not lighting, the vehicle's upper stage arrived well within the destination target basket.
- The second launch took place almost five years later, on February 10, 1997, at the Nevada Test Site, in Nevada, US. This launch would prove to be the first and last successful launch of the Castor-Orbus.
- The final launch of the Castor-Orbus was not successful. It took place on October 4, 1997, at the Nevada Test Site.

== See also ==
- List of rockets
