= Satélite de Coleta de Dados =

Brazilian satellites

SCD Satélite de Coleta de Dados (SCD, Portuguese for "Data-Collecting Satellite") is a series of satellites developed in Brazil.

== SCD-1 ==
SCD-1
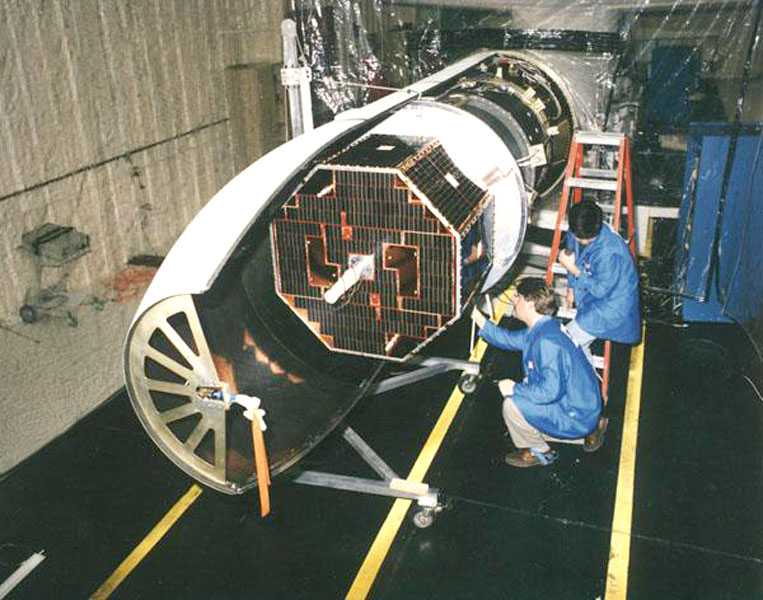
- Mission type: Earth orbiter
- Operator: INPE
- COSPAR ID: 1993-009B
- SATCAT no.: 22490
- Website: SCD-1
- Mission duration: 1 year (planned); 33 years, 9 months and 10 days (ongoing)

Spacecraft properties
- Manufacturer: INPE
- Launch mass: 115 kilograms (254 lb)
- Power: 110 W

Start of mission
- Launch date: February 9, 1993, 14:30:34 UTC
- Rocket: Pegasus 003/F3
- Launch site: Kennedy
- Contractor: Orbital Sciences

Orbital parameters
- Reference system: Geocentric
- Regime: Low Earth
- Semi-major axis: 7,121 kilometers (4,425 mi)
- Eccentricity: 0.0043226
- Perigee altitude: 719.9 kilometers (447.3 mi)
- Apogee altitude: 781.5 kilometers (485.6 mi)
- Inclination: 24.9707°
- Period: 99.7 minutes
- RAAN: 25.5298 degrees
- Argument of perigee: 91.5976 degrees
- Mean anomaly: 356.9573 degrees
- Mean motion: 14.44530728
- Epoch: 14 September 2018

The first one, SCD-1, was launched on February 9, 1993. It was the first satellite designed, developed, and assembled entirely in Brazil. It remains in operation to this date, and as such it is the only autonomous spacecraft in continuous operation in Earth orbit for more than thirty years. SCD-1 was designed, developed, built, and tested by Brazilian scientists, engineers, and technicians working at National Institute of Space Research and in Brazilian industries. It was made to be launched with a Brazilian rocket in 1989. Once it was officially recognized that the rocket could not be completed until many years later, SCD-1, after undergoing minor adaptations, was finally launched with a Pegasus rocket made by Orbital Sciences. The rocket was launched from a B-52 airplane while flying over the Atlantic Ocean.

SCD-1 is an experimental communication satellite with an environmental mission. It receives data collected on the ground or at sea by hundreds of automatic data-collecting platforms (DCPs) and retransmits all the information in a combined real-time signal back to tracking stations on Earth. Applications include hydrology, meteorology, and monitoring of the environment in general. The data are used by agencies such as the Weather Forecasting and Climate Studies Center (Centro de Previsão do Tempo e Estudos Climáticos—CPTEC), hydroelectric power managers, and both private and governmental institutions with many different interests. An example is meteorological and environmental data collected in the Amazon region, including the levels of carbon monoxide and carbon dioxide in the atmosphere. These data are transmitted to INPE and are used for monitoring forest fires.

SCD-1 weighs approximately 110 kg and goes around the Earth every 100 minutes on a nearly circular orbit at about 760 km altitude. The inclination of the orbit with respect to the plane of the equator is 25 degrees, providing excellent coverage of equatorial, tropical, and subtropical regions (up to about 35 degrees of latitude) around the world. The spin-stabilized spacecraft has the shape of an octagonal prism, with a diameter of 1 meter and a height near 70 cm without the antennas that are mounted on both base surfaces. It was originally designed for a life of one year with 80% probability, but it has survived 30 years in operation (as of 2023) without any crippling functional failure. However, since its chemical (nickel-cadmium) batteries are now completely run down, the satellite can no longer be used while it is in the Earth's shadow.

After the buzz of the New Horizons spacecraft flyby of NASA in July 2015, revealing feature and characteristics on Pluto, the International Astronomical Union (IAU) will scan an area on the surface of Pluto, which possibly will be named after the Sátelite Coleta de Dados (SCD-1), as “Coleta de Dados”, located in the large Tombaugh Regio, inside the area Sputnik Planitia.

More than thirty companies were involved in the production of the SCD-1, with INPE itself providing much of the electronics.

== SCD-2A ==
SCD-2A
- Mission type: Earth orbiter
- Operator: INPE
- COSPAR ID: 1997-F03
- Mission duration: 2 years (planned)

Spacecraft properties
- Manufacturer: INPE
- Launch mass: 115.0 kilograms (253.5 lb)
- Power: 110 W

Start of mission
- Launch date: November 02, 1997
- Rocket: VLS-1 V1
- Launch site: Alcântara VLS Pad

Orbital parameters
- Reference system: Geocentric
- Regime: Circular
- Apogee altitude: 3 kilometres (1.9 mi)
- Epoch: Planned

SCD-2A (Satélite de Coleta de Dados 2A in Portuguese) was a Brazilian data collection satellite that was fully designed, built, and qualified in Brazil. SCD-2A was almost identical to SCD-2, which was successfully launched in 1998. SCD-2A was lost in the inaugural launch of the Brazilian rocket VLS-1 in 1997.

SCD-2A was launched on November 2, 1997, by means of a VLS-1 rocket from the Alcântara Launch Center in the state of Maranhão, Brazil. It had a mass of 115 kilograms. The satellite was lost due to an ignition failure in one of the first-stage thrusters during the first few seconds of flight, which required activation of the vehicle's self-destruct command.

== SCD-2 ==
SCD-2 (Satélite de Coleta de Dados)
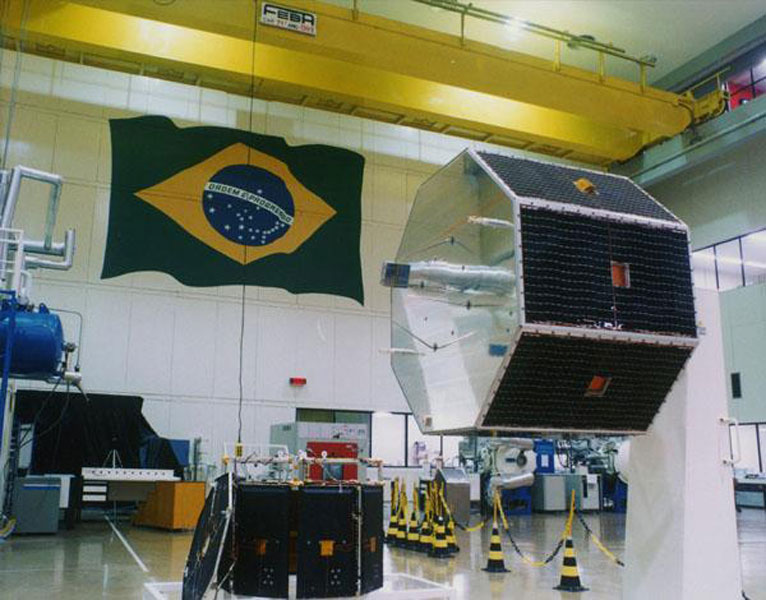
- Mission type: Earth orbiter
- Operator: INPE
- COSPAR ID: 1998-060A
- SATCAT no.: 22490
- Website: SCD-2

Spacecraft properties
- Manufacturer: INPE
- Launch mass: 115.0 kilograms (254 lb)
- Power: 70.0 W

Start of mission
- Launch date: October 23, 1998, 00:02:00 UTC
- Rocket: Pegasus H
- Launch site: Cape Canaveral

Orbital parameters
- Reference system: Geocentric
- Semi-major axis: 7,124 kilometers (4,427 mi)
- Eccentricity: 0.0017301
- Perigee altitude: 740.8 kilometers (460.3 mi)
- Apogee altitude: 765.4 kilometers (475.6 mi)
- Inclination: 24.9959°
- Period: 99.7 minutes
- RAAN: 150.2763 degrees
- Mean motion: 85784
- Epoch: 20 January 2015, 18:31:41 UTC

SCD-2 has the function to collect the environmental data to be later picked up by tracer stations and be distributed to organizations and to various users. SCD-2 was launched on October 23, 1998, by a Pegasus rocket, that was transported under the wing of a Lockheed L-1011 Tristar, that launched it from 13 km altitude. It is the second satellite of MECB - Complete Brazilian Space Mission - program developed by INPE. Its solar panels were built with technology developed in Rio Grande do Sul, Brazil, in partnership with the project team of the satellite's power subsystem by INPE.

On its 10th birthday, on 23 October 2008, SCD-2 had completed 52,807 orbits around the Earth. Within a decade, it had covered a distance of 2,365,088,861 kilometers, which corresponds to 3,112 times round trips to the moon and back (distance between Earth and the Moon: approximately 236,000 miles). SCD-2 has now more than doubled these figures, having completed its second decade of successful operation in orbit.

== Orbital decay ==
An estimate published in the Journal of Physics indicates that the SCD-1 and SCD-2 satellites are not expected to re-enter the atmosphere before the year 2120.

== See also ==
- CBERS
