= Coleta de Dados Colles =

Cluster of hills on Pluto

Challenger Colles
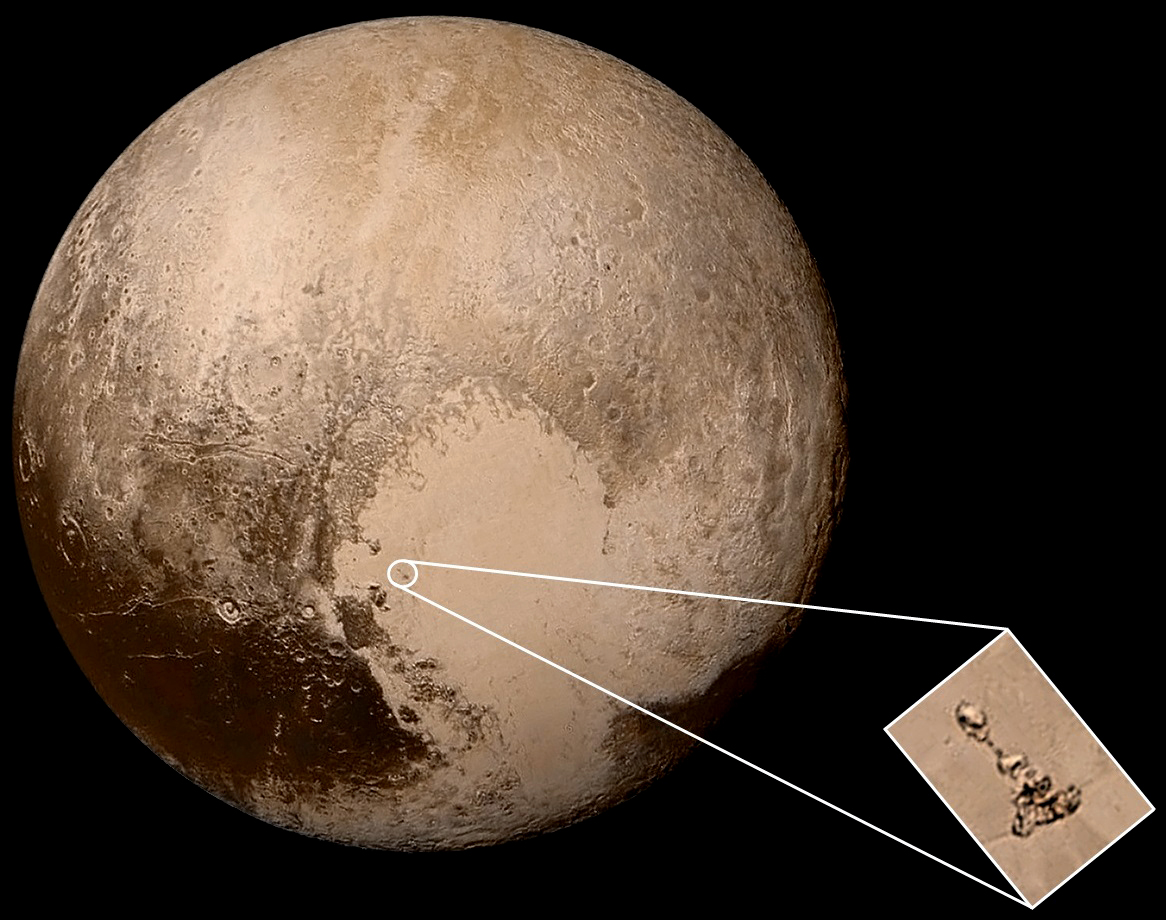
- Location of the Coleta de Dados Colles on the dwarf planet Pluto
- Feature type: Hills
- Location: Western Sputnik Planitia, Pluto
- Discoverer: New Horizons
- Naming: Satélite de Coleta de Dados

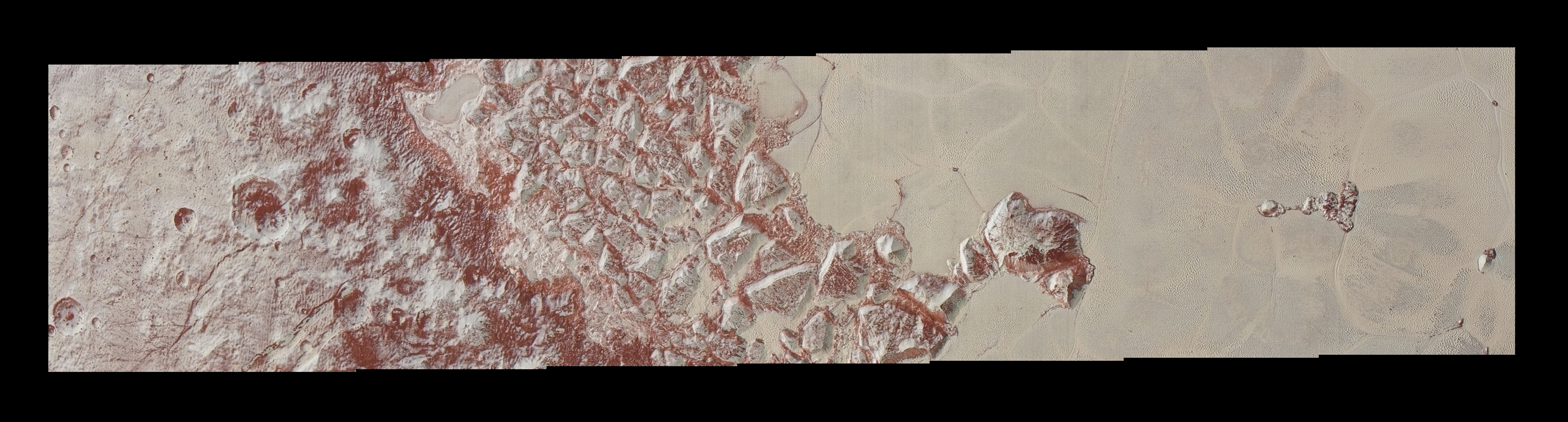
Coleta de Dados Colles (right)

The Coleta de Dados Colles are a cluster of hills ("colles") on the smooth plains of Sputnik Planitia on Pluto. The hills are over 100 km from the major mountain ranges to the west (such as Zheng He Montes), and appear to be blocks of water ice floating in the denser nitrogen ice of Sputnik Planitia. The hills were informally named on 28 July 2015, by the research team of the New Horizons mission after the first Brazilian satellite, the Satélite de Coleta de Dados ("Satellite for Data Collecting" in Portuguese). The ridge's name has yet to be recognized officially by the IAU.
