= VLS-1 V01 =

- VLS-1 V01 launch

VLS-1 launch
- Launch: 2 November 1997, 12:25 a.m UTC
- Operator: Ministry of Aeronautics; AEB; INPE
- Pad: Alcântara Launch Center VLS-Pad
- Payload: (Brazil) SCD-2A
- Outcome: Failure
- Apogee: 3,230 metres (10,600 ft)
- Launch duration: 65 seconds

VLS-1 flights

VLS-1 V01 was the first launch of the VLS-1 rocket that took place on November 2, 1997, from the Alcântara Launch Center with the goal of putting the SCD-2A satellite into orbit. The launch was unsuccessful, with the rocket being remotely destroyed due to deviation from its trajectory.

== Background and goals ==
The VLS-1 rocket was originally proposed in 1979 as part of the Brazilian Complete Space Mission. It was originally planned to launch in 1989. However, it was later delayed to 1990, then 1994, 1995, finally becoming ready in 1997 within "Operation Brazil". The mission had the objective of placing in orbit the SCD-2A satellite developed by INPE, and to test the vehicle in flight. (Note: Much of the delay is due to the technological embargo Brazil suffered from the G-7. This only ended in 1995 when the country signed the treaty on non-proliferation of high destruction missiles (MITCR). Another reason was the lack of financial resources for the project. The SCD-2A, with development authorized in 24 August 1995, was valued at $5 million, while the rocket was valued at $6.5 million. In 2011, the Folha de São Paulo revealed documents indicating that the U.S. embargo prevented the VLS from being completed in 1989, and documents from Wikileaks indicated that the pressure was still in place by 2009.) The first prototype of the VLS was 80% Brazilian technology.

The satellite was planned to be placed into a circular orbit with an altitude of 750 kilometers, and on February 20, the payload fairing separation test had already been successfully carried out. On July 1, 1997, the equipment was sent to the Alcântara base and both the rocket and the satellite were ready by August 1997. (Note: The Official Gazette of June 26, 1997, states that the VLS prototype was already complete in December 1996.) For a launch cost of R$7.215 million in 1997 (US$12.41 million in 2024), it would be cheaper than the U.S. rocket Pegasus which cost R$16.65 million (US$28.64 million in 2024) per launch.

The Ministry of Aeronautics barred the Press and civil authorities from attending the launch, claiming "security issues and lack of infrastructure" for receiving the press and guests at the base. As a result, President Fernando Henrique Cardoso had his visit to the base moved forward to October 21. Initially the launch was to take place in early September; however, delays at the center and the fact that the rocket was struck by lightning postponed the preparations. AEB sought to work with Embratel and Telebrás to broadcast the launch nationwide.

The launch was supposed to take place on October 26, 1997, but was delayed in the early hours of the same day due to a malfunction in the Doppler radar, made by Thomson-CSF, which would track the launch and identify the satellite's orbit. If the next attempt did not occur by the end of the planned window (November 10), the rocket would have to be put into a horizontal position due to the instability of its fuel.

== Launch ==
On November 2, during the countdown, the timer had to be paused for about 15 minutes due to a plane crossing the restricted airspace.

At 12:25 a.m. (UTC) the rocket was launched (Note: "Jornal do Brasil" said that the rocket would be ignited by President Fernando Henrique Cardoso from the Planalto Palace through a satellite transmission system.) with a mass of 50 tons at the time of launch. Within about a minute the technicians noticed a problem with strap-on booster D, which caused the rocket to climb at an incline. Although the vehicle corrected the inclination, about seven tons of dead weight unbalanced the ascent, which led, 65 seconds after launch, to the remote destruction of a satellite worth $5 million and a $6.5 million rocket.

It was later revealed that of the four boosters, one was not engaged, causing it to go off course. The rocket was destroyed at a height of 3,230 metres (10,600 ft), and its debris fell into the interdicted sea area about 2 kilometres (1.2 mi; 1.1 nmi) from the launch pad. According to the description in the report by the DEPED, the lower part of the vehicle, unable to withstand "the increasing aerodynamic load caused by the high angle of attack," broke apart between stages 2 and 3, 29 seconds into the flight, triggering the self-destruct mechanism. The upper section, with the payload fairing, followed a ballistic trajectory, disintegrating after 65 seconds and crashing 2 kilometers from Alcântara. At the time of the destruction, the rocket was going 700 km/h. (Note: The accident sequence is technically described in Palmerio 2017, pp. 136–139)

A 15-minute pause was taken in the picture chain operated by Radiobrás and broadcast to auditoriums with guests in Brasília, São Luís and São José dos Campos. On the return of the broadcast, Colonel Thiago da Silva announced the failure.

== Aftermath ==
Luiz Gylvan Meira Filho, the then-president of the Brazilian Space Agency, noted that the fact that the rocket sought to correct its trajectory was an engineering success. The investigation pointed to a malfunctioning "mechanical safety device", that hindered the transmission of the pyrotechnic order, as responsible for the accident. Fabio Wagner Costa, from the University Center of Brasília, reports that the test was considered positive because it allowed "the validation of important components, including the control system".

A professor at the Aeronautics Institute of Technology, speaking anonymously to the media, said that the accident could have been avoided if the entire boosters assembly had been tested in an integrated manner, but the CTA tests only addressed each strap-on booster separately. The "integrated test", with all four boosters, only occurred with the launch, contrary to what the ITA had advised. The military was warned about the risk of an accident months before the launch. Not all the tests were performed on the safety mechanism responsible for the accident due to the pressure to get the launch done on time.

The investigation by the DEPED, which identified the failure in the ignition system, based on telemetry and video footage, revealed that the safety systems self-destructed the rocket as expected. Finally, the report recommended an in-depth analysis of the pyrotechnic system and additional qualification tests.

The next launch occurred in 1999, ending with the remote destruction of the vehicle and the SACI-2 satellite about three minutes after liftoff.

== Flight profile ==
Mission timeline
| Time | Event | Result |
|---|---|---|
| 00:00 | Liftoff | Booster D does not engage, which affects the orientation of the VLS. |
| 00:25 | Breakup between stages 2 and 3, followed by the self-destruction of the vehicle | |
| 00:55 | 2nd stage ignition | —N/a |
| 01:05 | Remote destruction of the 4th stage and the payload fairing | |
| 01:09 | 3rd stage ignition | —N/a |
| 02:11 | Payload fairing separation | —N/a |
| 03:00 | 3rd stage shutdown | —N/a |
| 03:08 | 3rd stage separation | —N/a |
| ~07:00 | 4th stage ignition | —N/a |
| 09:00 | Satellite orbit injection | —N/a |

== See also ==
- Brazilian space program

== Bibliography ==
DEPED report

- "Introdução" [Introduction]. Relatório de Falha - VLS-1 V01 [Failure Report - VLS-1 V01] (in Brazilian Portuguese). Archived from the original on 2004-08-12.
- "Dados Disponíveis para a Análise". Relatório de Falha - VLS-1 V01 (in Brazilian Portuguese). Archived from the original on 2006-08-21.
- "Metodologia de Análise da Falha" [Failure Analysis Methodology]. Relatório de Falha - VLS-1 V01 [Failure Report - VLS-1 V01] (in Brazilian Portuguese). Archived from the original on 2004-08-19.
- "Análise da Falha" [Failure Analysis]. Relatório de Falha - VLS-1 V01 [Failure Report - VLS-1 V01] (in Brazilian Portuguese). Archived from the original on 2004-08-19.
- "Conclusão" [Conclusion]. Relatório de Falha - VLS-1 V01 [Failure Report - VLS-1 V01] (in Brazilian Portuguese). Archived from the original on 2004-08-19.

(Chronological order)

- Maria, Joaquim (1984-12-08). "Com a subida do Sonda IV, o futuro está lançado" [With the rise in Sonda IV, the future is set.]. Manchete (in Portuguese). No. 1703. p. 119.
- "Brasil constrói seu primeiro satélite genuíno" [Brazil builds its first genuine satellite.]. Diário do Pará (in Portuguese). Vol. 7, no. 2478. 1990-05-27. p. 5.
- "Inpe deverá ter reforço orçamentário" [INPE should receive increased funding.]. O Fluminense (in Brazilian Portuguese). Vol. 116, no. 33669. 1993-06-16. p. 7.
- Bonalume Neto, Ricardo (1997-02-21). "Teste aprova foguete e satélite brasileiros" [Tests approve Brazilian rocket and satellite.]. Folha de S. Paulo (in Portuguese).
- "7.4.2 Presidência da República". Diário Oficial da União (in Brazilian Portuguese). Vol. CXXXV, no. 120. 1997-06-26. p. 13403. [7.4.2 Presidency of the Republic]
- "Equipamentos para a base de Alcântara" [Equipment for the Alcântara base]. Jornal do Commercio (in Portuguese). Vol. 170, no. 221. 1997-07-02. p. 10.
- "Resolução Nº 5, de 24 de agosto de 1995" [Resolution No. 5, of August 24, 1995]. Diário Oficial da União (in Brazilian Portuguese). Vol. CXXXV, no. 124. 1997-07-02. p. 13915.
- Cardoso, Beatriz (1997-08-16). "O Brasil entre as Potências" [Brazil Among the Powers]. Manchete (in Portuguese). No. 2367. pp. 49–50.
- "Foguete brasileiro colocará em órbita o satélite SCD2A" [Brazilian rocket will place the SCD2A satellite into orbit.]. O Pioneiro (in Portuguese). Vol. 49, no. 6780. August 1997. p. 19.
- "Brasil prepara novo satélite" [Brazil prepares new satellite.]. Jornal do Commercio (in Portuguese). Vol. 171. 1997-10-17. p. 10.
- "Brasil rumo ao espaço" [Brazil on the road to space.]. Jornal do Brasil (in Portuguese). Vol. 107, no. 197. 1997-10-22. p. 6.
- "VLS deixa Brasil entre os 8 mais em conquistas espaciais" [VLS places Brazil among the top 8 in space achievements.]. A Tribuna (in Portuguese). Vol. 104, no. 211. 1997-10-22. p. 4.
- "Foguete brasileiro já está na base" [The Brazilian rocket is already at the base.]. Jornal do Commercio (in Portuguese). Vol. 171. 1997-10-22. p. 12.
- "Lançamento do foguete VLS é suspenso" [VLS rocket launch suspended.]. A Tribuna (in Portuguese). Vol. 104, no. 216. 1997-10-27. p. 10.
- Neto, Ricardo Bolanume (1997-11-03). "Foguete brasileiro fracassa, é destruído e cai no mar" [Brazilian rocket fails, is destroyed and falls into the sea.]. Folha de São Paulo (in Portuguese). Archived from the original on 2004-01-30.
- "Lançamento de foguete acaba em explosão" [Rocket launch ends in explosion.]. Jornal do Brasil (in Portuguese). Vol. 107, no. 209. 1997-11-03. p. 4.
- "Agência apura causa da falha no lançamento" [Agency investigates cause of launch failure.]. Folha de S. Paulo (in Brazilian Portuguese). 1997-11-04.
- "Aeronáutica prevê lançamento de satélite neste domingo" [Aeronautics Ministry plans to launch satellite this Sunday.]. Jornal do Commercio (in Portuguese). Vol. 171. November 1997. p. 14.
- "Fracasso do foguete estava previsto" [The rocket's failure was predicted.]. O Pioneiro (in Portuguese). Vol. 50, no. 6838. 1997-11-06. p. 14.
- Lino, Geraldo Luís (1997-11-06). "O Brasil reumo à aventura de conquistar o espaço" [Brazil on the path to conquering space.]. Tribuna da Imprensa (in Portuguese). Vol. 48, no. 14586. p. 4.
- "Especialista apontou falha no foguete" [Expert pointed out flaw in rocket.]. Jornal do Commercio (in Portuguese). 1997-11-10. p. 22.
- Monteiro, Ricardo Rego (December 1997). "Brasil, o novo sócio do clube dos satélites" [Brazil, the newest member of the satellite club.]. Jornal do Commercio (in Portuguese). p. 21.
- "Acidente adiou projeto em 97" [Accident delayed project in '97]. Folha de S. Paulo (in Portuguese). 1999-11-11.
- Ottoboni, Júlio (1999-12-12). "Inpe cancela programa de microssatélites, após fracasso com Saci-2" [INPE cancels microsatellite program after failure with Saci-2.]. Folha de Londrina (in Brazilian Portuguese).
- "História registra dois fracassos anteriores". A Tribuna (in Brazilian Portuguese). Vol. 110, no. 151. 2003-08-23. p. C-3.
- Berquó, Jolan Eduardo; Coelho, Elizabeth Cabral; Martinolli, João Bosco; Corrêa, Cleber Souza (February 2004). Relatório da Investigação do Acidente ocorrido com o VLS-1 VO3, em 22 de agosto de 2003, em Alcântara, Maranhão [Investigation Report of the Accident involving the VLS-1 VO3, on August 22, 2003, in Alcântara, Maranhão] (PDF) (Report). São José dos Campos: Ministerio de Defesa Comando da Aeronautica. p. 118. Archived (PDF) from the original on 2013-11-08.
- Costa, Fabio Wagner (2004). O Programa Espacial Brasileiro [The Brazilian Space Program] (PDF) (Monograph) (in Portuguese). Centro Universitário de Brasília. p. 60.
- Valente, Rubens; Magalhães, João Carlos; Odilla, Fernanda (2011-10-09). "EUA boicotaram o programa espacial do Brasil nos anos 90" [The US boycotted Brazil's space program in the 1990s.]. Folha de São Paulo (in Brazilian Portuguese).
- Bôas, Danton José Fortes Villas. O Veículo Lançador de Satélites - VLS-1 [The Satellite Launch Vehicle - VLS-1] (PDF) (Thesis) (in Portuguese). IAE. p. 24.
- Palmerio, Ariovaldo Feliz (2017). Introdução à Tecnologia de Foguetes [Introduction to Rocket Technology] (PDF) (in Portuguese) (2 ed.). São José dos Campos: SindCT. p. 304. ISBN 978-85-62042-05-8.
