= Tenzing Montes =

Blocky mountain range on Pluto

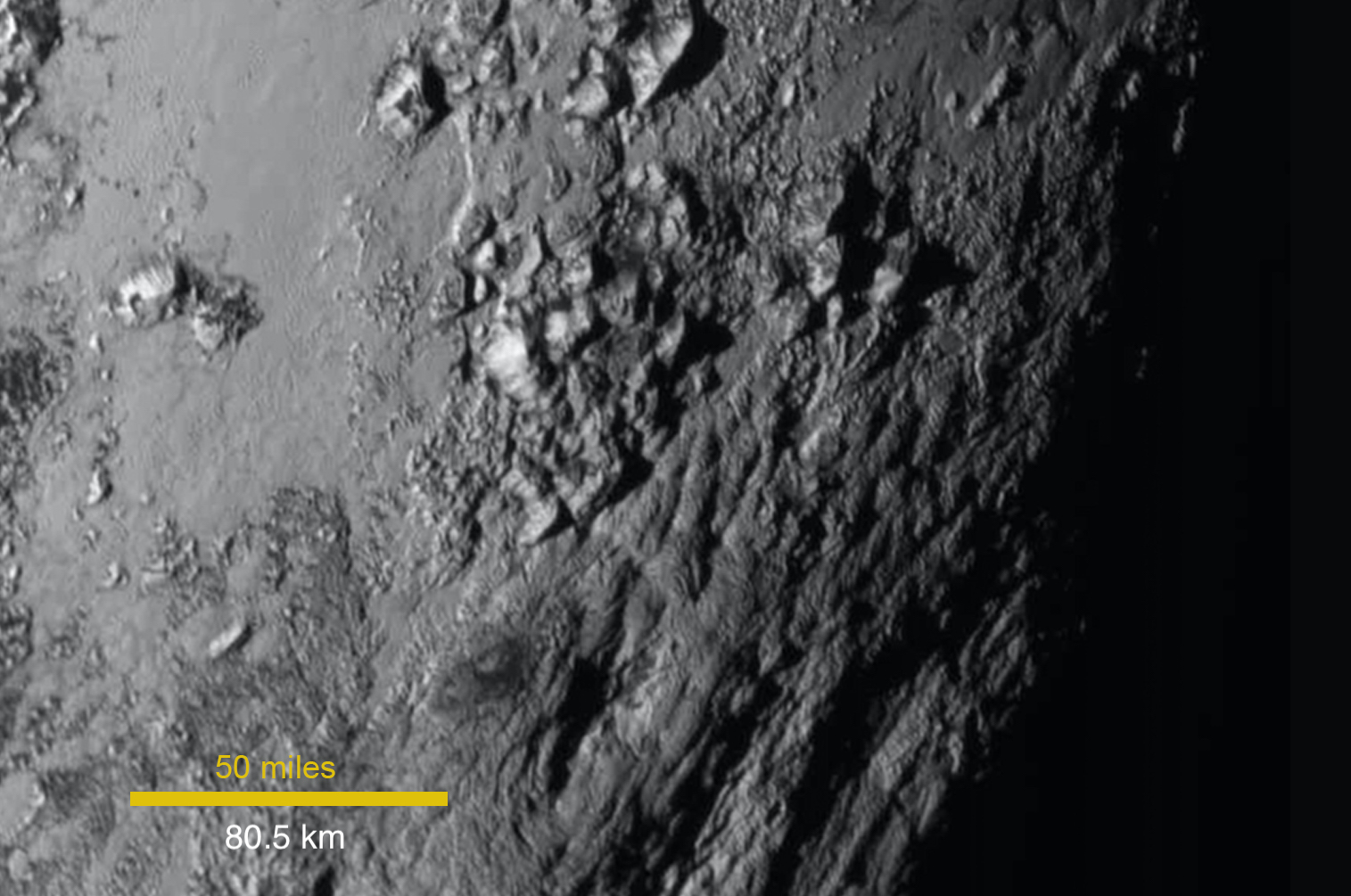
- The Tenzing Montes as viewed by New Horizons on 14 July 2015.
- Feature type: Mountain range
- Location: Western Sputnik Planitia, Pluto
- Coordinates: 15°36′S 177°22′E
- Peak: 6.2 km (3.9 mi) (T2)
- Discoverer: New Horizons
- Eponym: Tenzing Norgay

The Tenzing Montes /ˈtɛnzɪŋ ˈmɒntiːz/ (formerly Norgay Montes) are a range of icy mountains on Pluto, bordering the southwest region of Sputnik Planitia and the nearby Hillary Montes and Wright Mons. With peaks reaching 6.2 km (3.9 mi; 20,000 ft) in height, they are the highest mountain range on Pluto, and also the steepest, with a mean slope of 19.2 degrees.

== Naming ==
The mountains, first viewed by the New Horizons spacecraft on 14 July 2015, and announced by NASA on 15 July 2015, are named after the Nepalese mountaineer Tenzing Norgay, who, along with Sir Edmund Hillary, made the first successful ascent of the highest peak on Earth, Mount Everest (29 May 1953). The mountains were informally called Norgay Montes by the New Horizons team, but that name was later changed from Norgay to Tenzing. (Note: Both Tenzing and Norgay are given names, but Norgay is often mistaken for a surname.) On 7 September 2017, the name Tenzing Montes was officially approved together with the names of Tombaugh Regio and twelve other nearby surface features.

== Highest peaks ==
Several massifs within Tenzing Montes reach elevations of more than 4 km above the surrounding terrain. The table below is based on Table 3 in Schenk et al. (2018).

| Name of range | Peak name (Note: Informal until approval by the International Astronomical Union.) | Location | Height (km, base-to-peak) |
|---|---|---|---|
| Tenzing Montes | "T2" | 16.4°S 175.6°E | 6.2±0.6 km |
| Tenzing Montes | "T1" | 16.0°S 174.9°E | 5.7±0.4 km |
| Tenzing Montes | "T3" | 16.9°S 176.3°E | 5.3±0.4 km |
| Tenzing Montes | "T4" | 21.7°S 179.7°E | 5.0±0.4 km |
| Tenzing Montes (south) | "T11" | 19.5°S 179.2°E | 4.5±0.4 km |
| Tenzing Montes (south) | "T12" | 20.3°S 178.9°E | 4.4±0.4 km |

The Tenzing Montes rise up to 6.2 km (3.9 mi; 20,000 ft) high, about twice as high as the Hillary Montes. In comparison, Mount Everest rises 4.6 km (2.9 mi; 15,000 ft) base-to-peak (though to an elevation of 8.8 km (5.5 mi; 29,000 ft) above sea level).

== Gallery ==
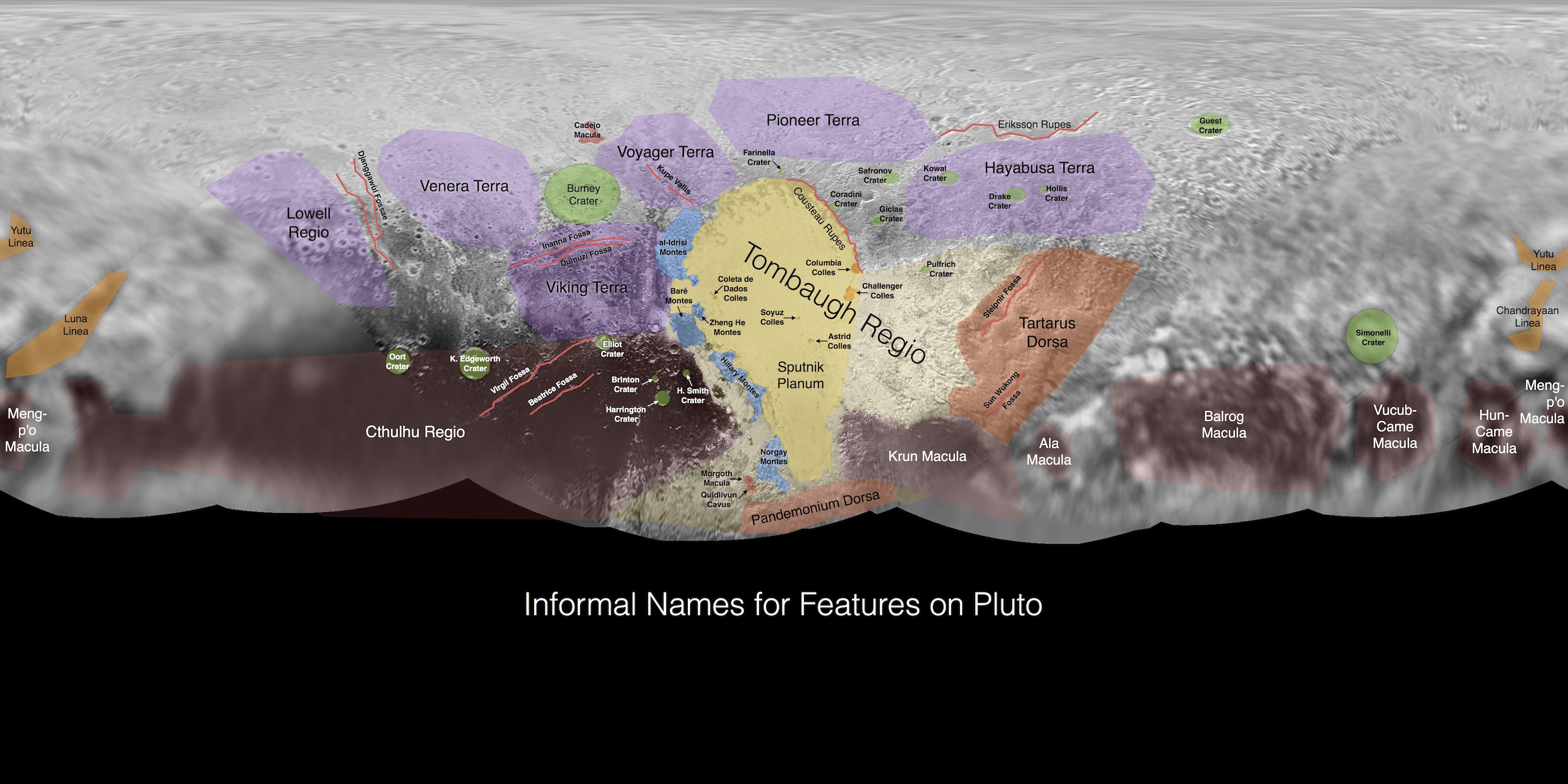
Pluto - map features
(context; 29 July 2015).
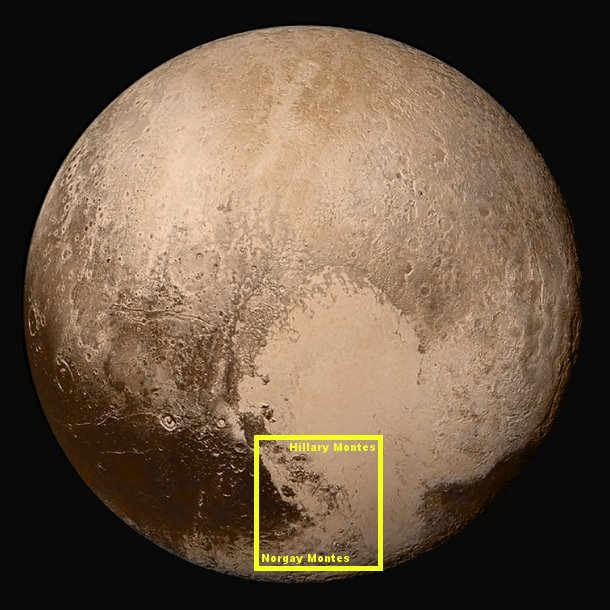
Pluto – Hillary Montes and Tenzing Montes
(context; 14 July 2015).

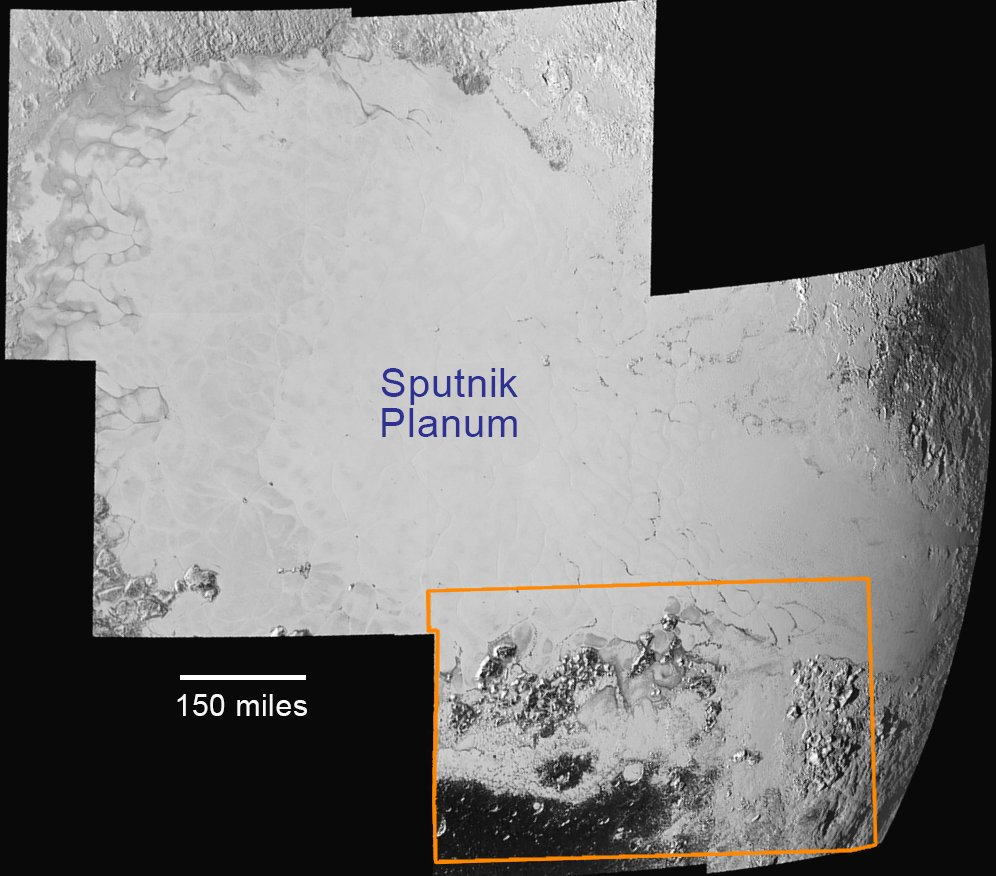
Hillary Montes and Tenzing Montes
(context; 14 July 2015).

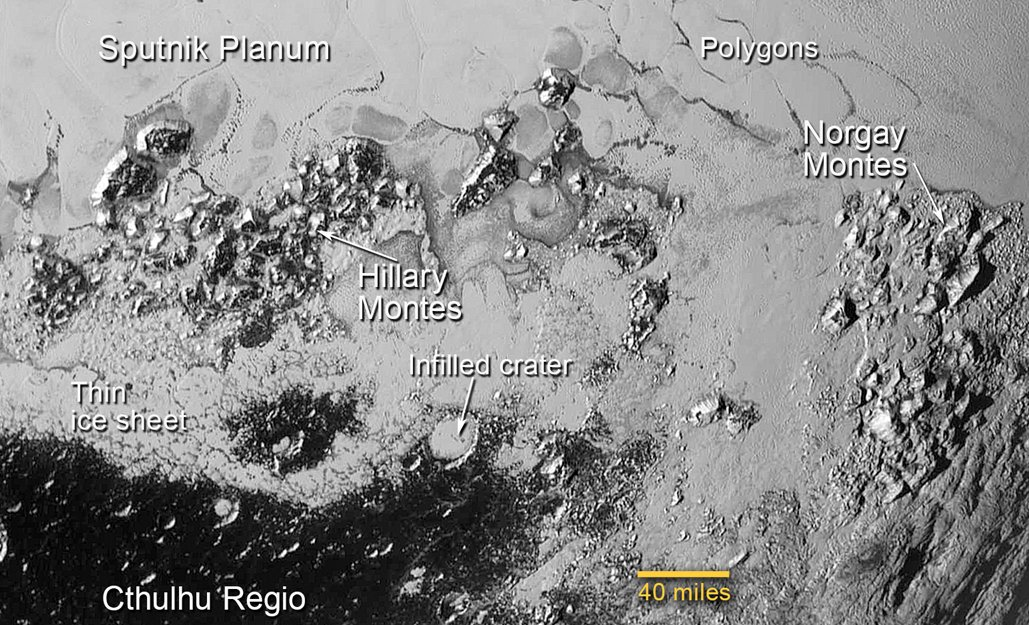
Hillary Montes and Tenzing Montes on Pluto
(context; 14 July 2015).

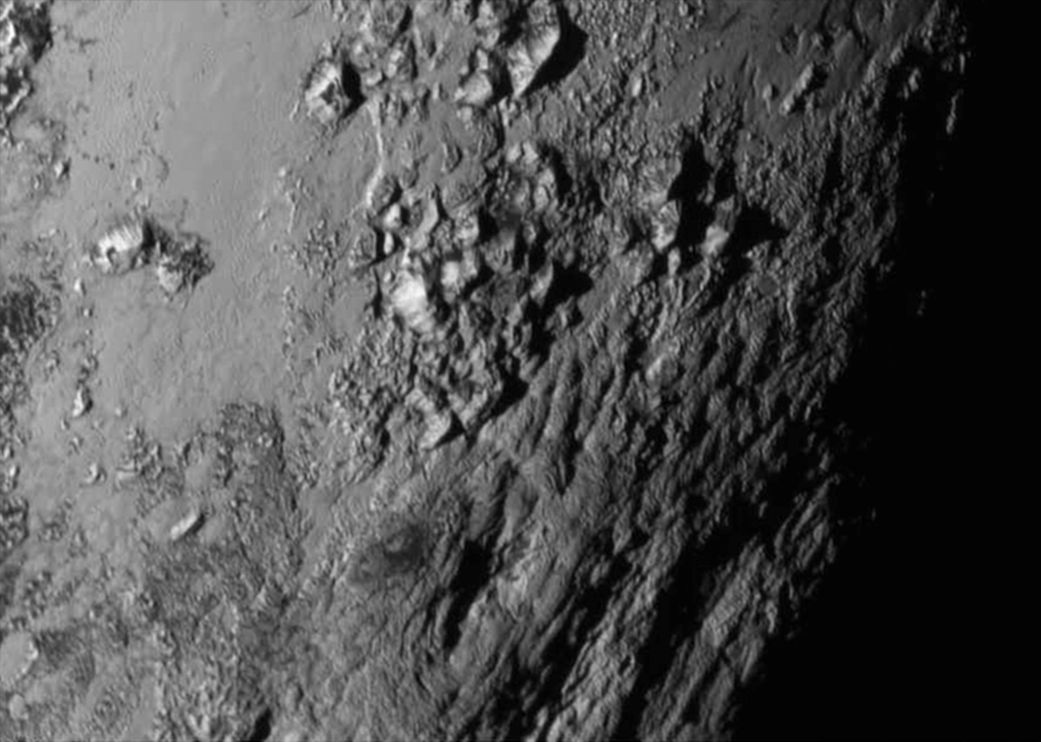
Tenzing Montes on Pluto
(closeup; 14 July 2015).
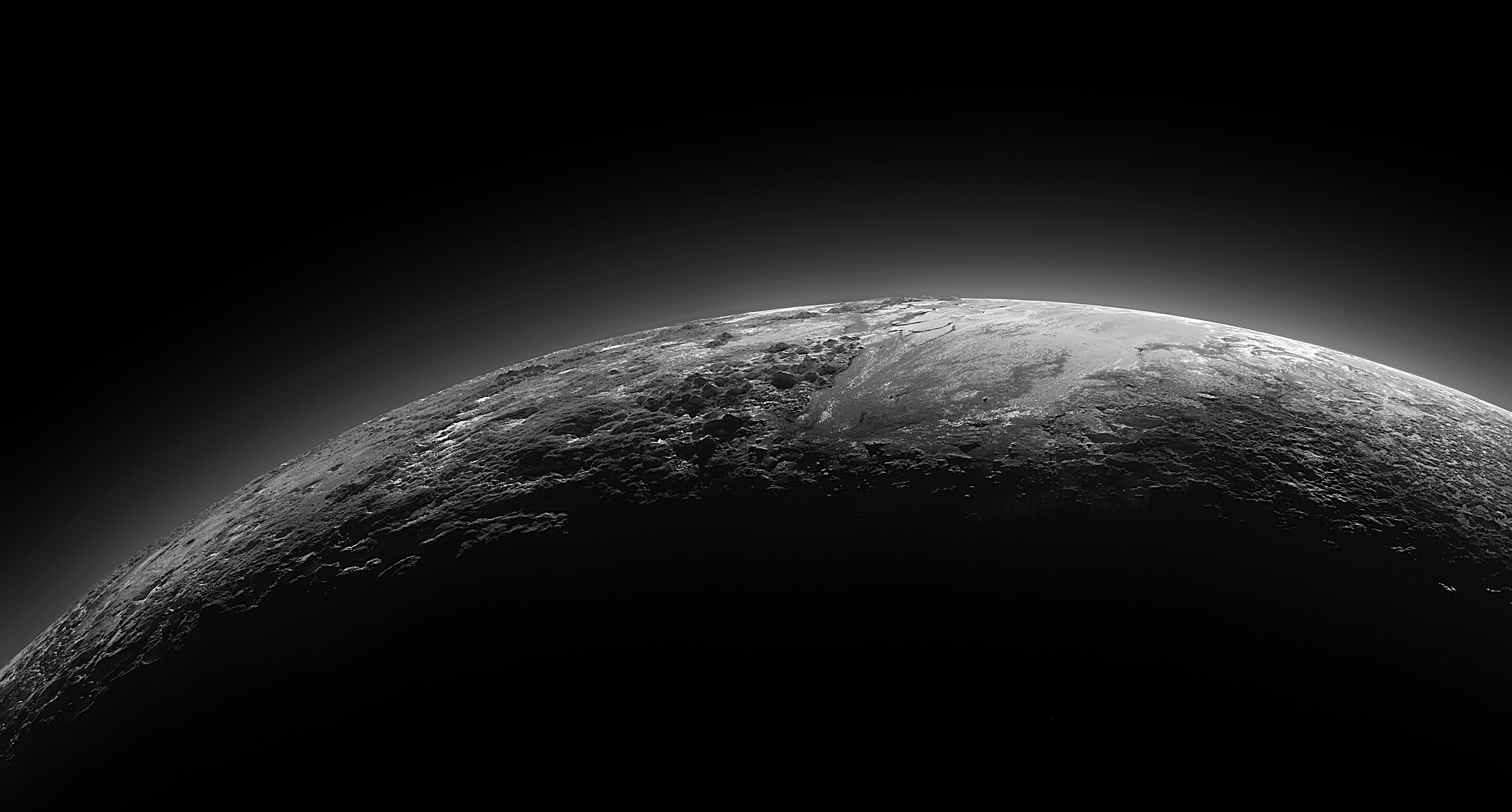
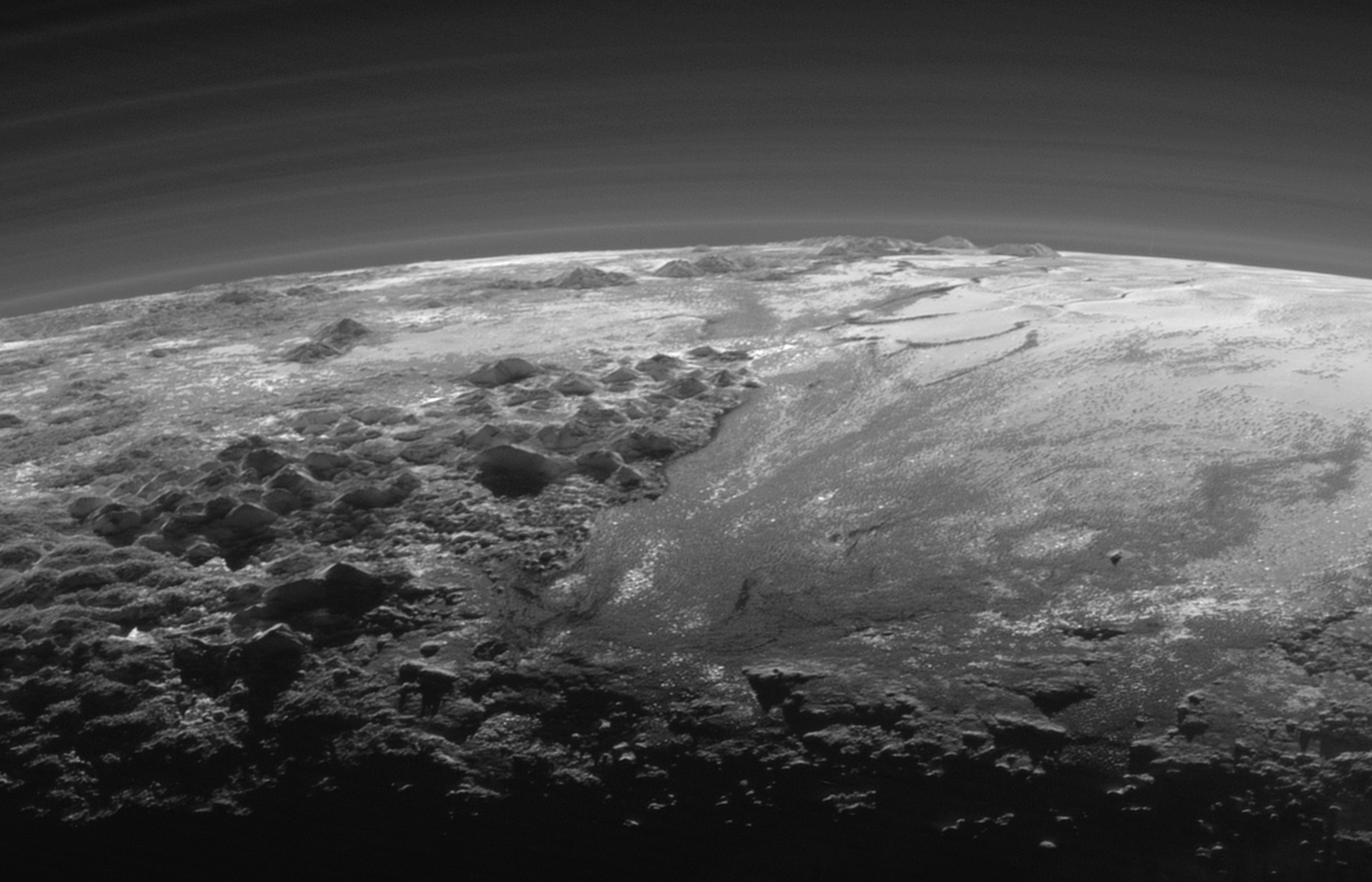
Pluto - Tenzing Montes (left foreground); Hillary Montes (skyline); Sputnik Planitia (right)
Near-sunset view includes several layers of atmospheric haze.

=== Videos ===
Pluto flyover (14 July 2015)

(00:30; released 18 September 2015)

(00:50; released 5 December 2015)

== See also ==
- Geography of Pluto
- Geology of Pluto
- List of geological features on Pluto
- List of tallest mountains in the Solar System
