= Hillary Montes =

Blocky mountain range on Pluto

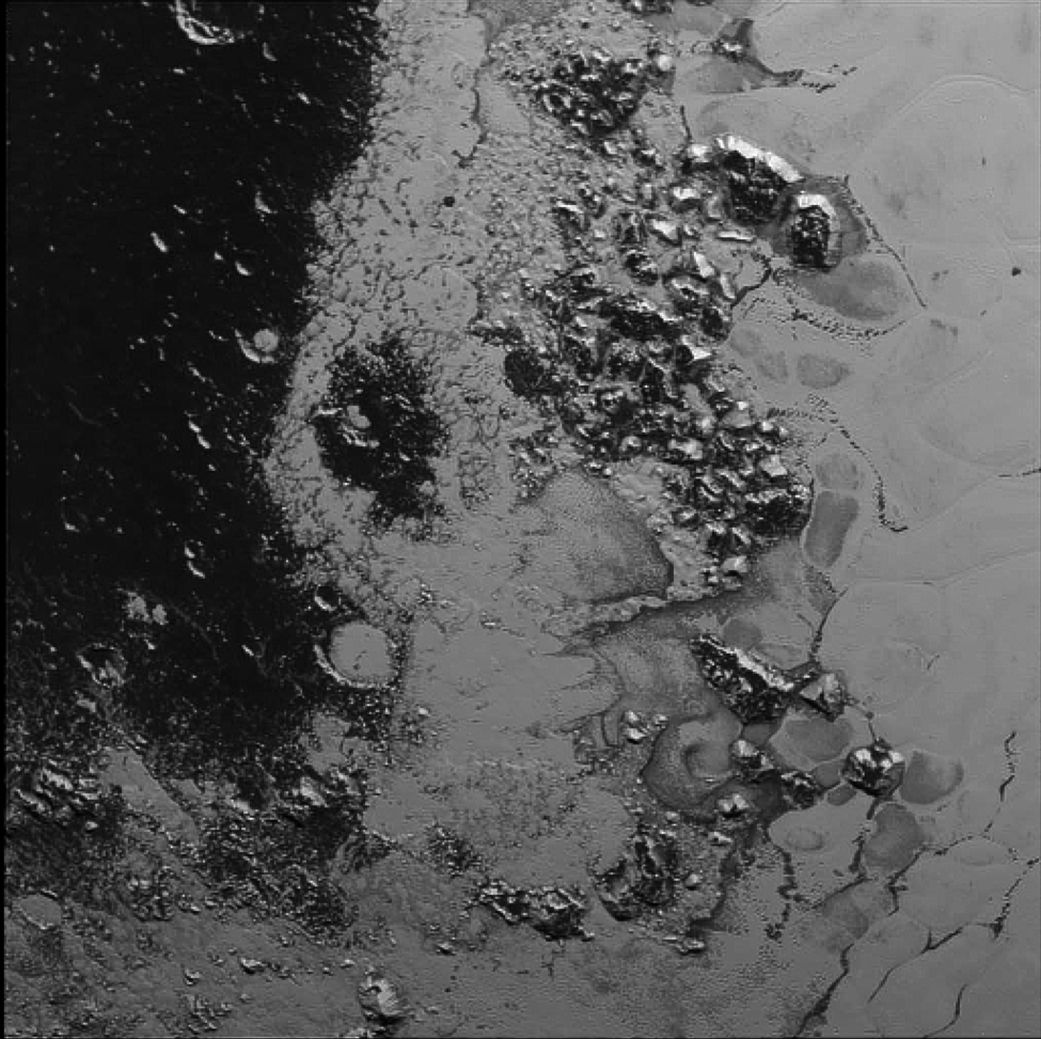
- The Hillary Montes as viewed by New Horizons on 14 July 2015
- Feature type: Mountain range
- Location: Western Sputnik Planitia, Pluto
- Coordinates: 5°N 170°E
- Peak: 3.5±0.4 km (2.2±0.2 mi)
- Discoverer: New Horizons
- Eponym: Edmund Hillary

The Hillary Montes /ˈhɪləri ˈmɒntiːz/ or /ˈmɒnteɪz/ (less officially, Hillary Mountains) are a mountain range that reach 3.5 km (2.2 mi; 11,000 ft) above the surface of the dwarf planet Pluto. They are located northwest of Tenzing Montes in the southwest border area of Sputnik Planitia in the south of Tombaugh Regio (or the part of Tombaugh Regio south of the equator). The Hillary Montes were first viewed by the New Horizons spacecraft on 14 July 2015, and announced by NASA on 24 July 2015.

== Naming ==
The mountains are named after Sir Edmund Hillary, New Zealand mountaineer, who, along with Nepalese Sherpa mountaineer Tenzing Norgay, were the first climbers to reach the summit of Mount Everest on 29 May 1953. On 7 September 2017, the name Hillary Montes was officially approved together with the names of Tombaugh Regio and twelve other nearby surface features.

== Relative size ==
The Hillary Montes rise to 3.5 km (2.2 mi; 11,000 ft) high from base to peak, about half as high as the Tenzing Montes.

== Gallery ==
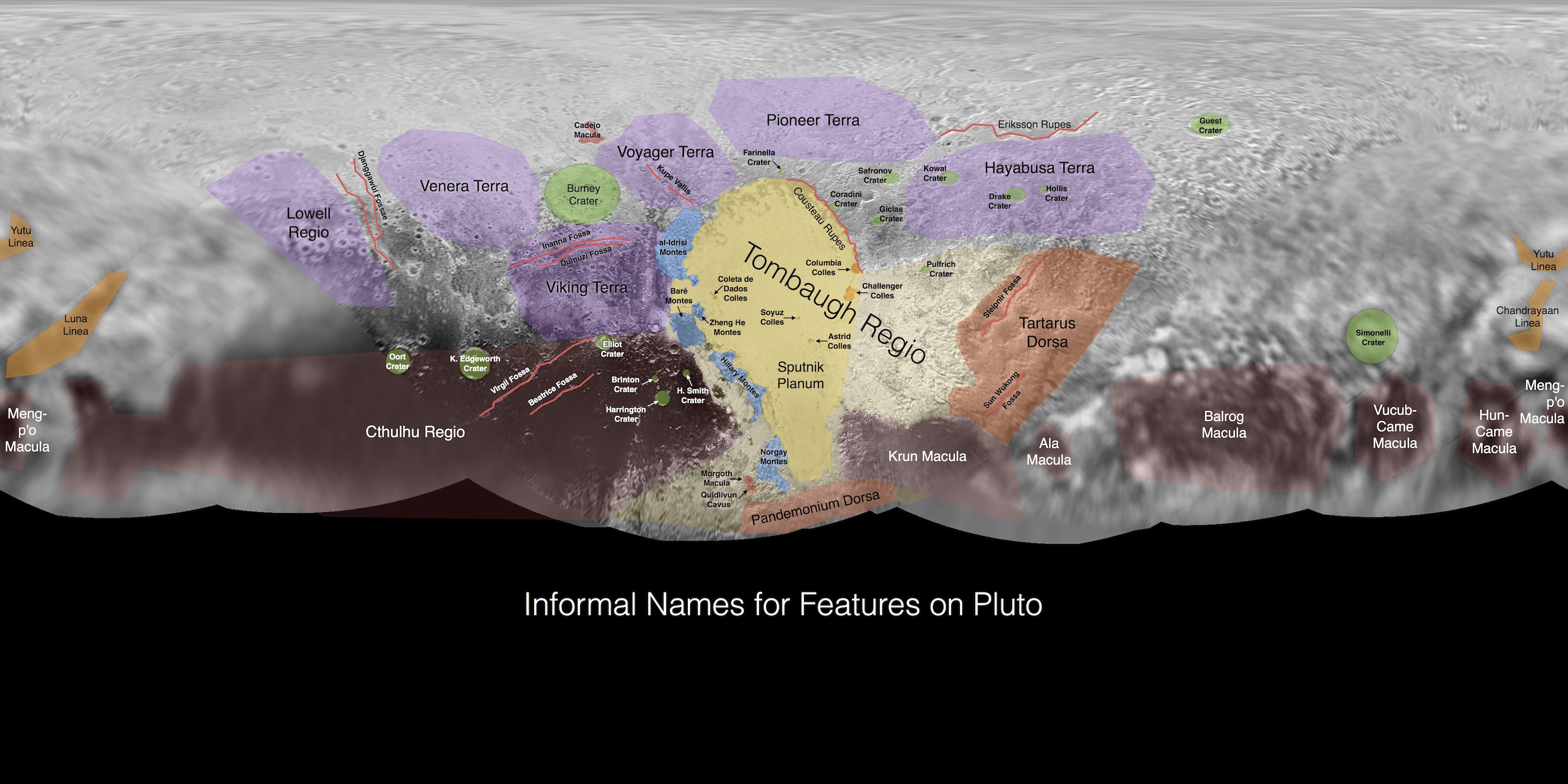
Pluto - map features
(context; 29 July 2015).
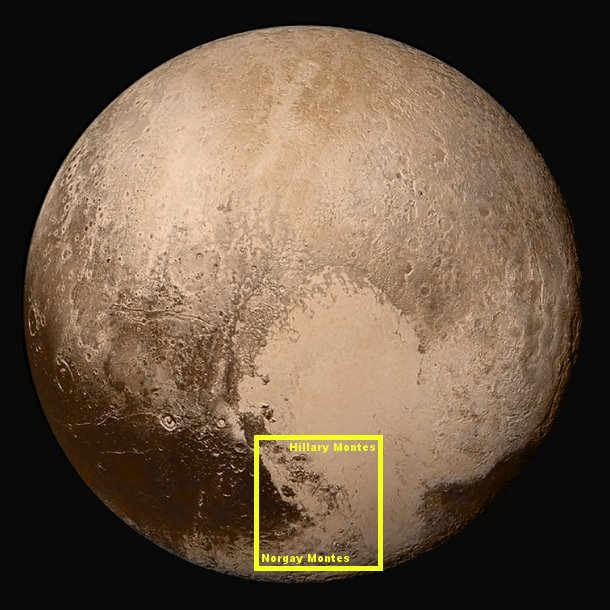
Pluto – Hillary Montes and Tenzing Montes
(context; 14 July 2015)

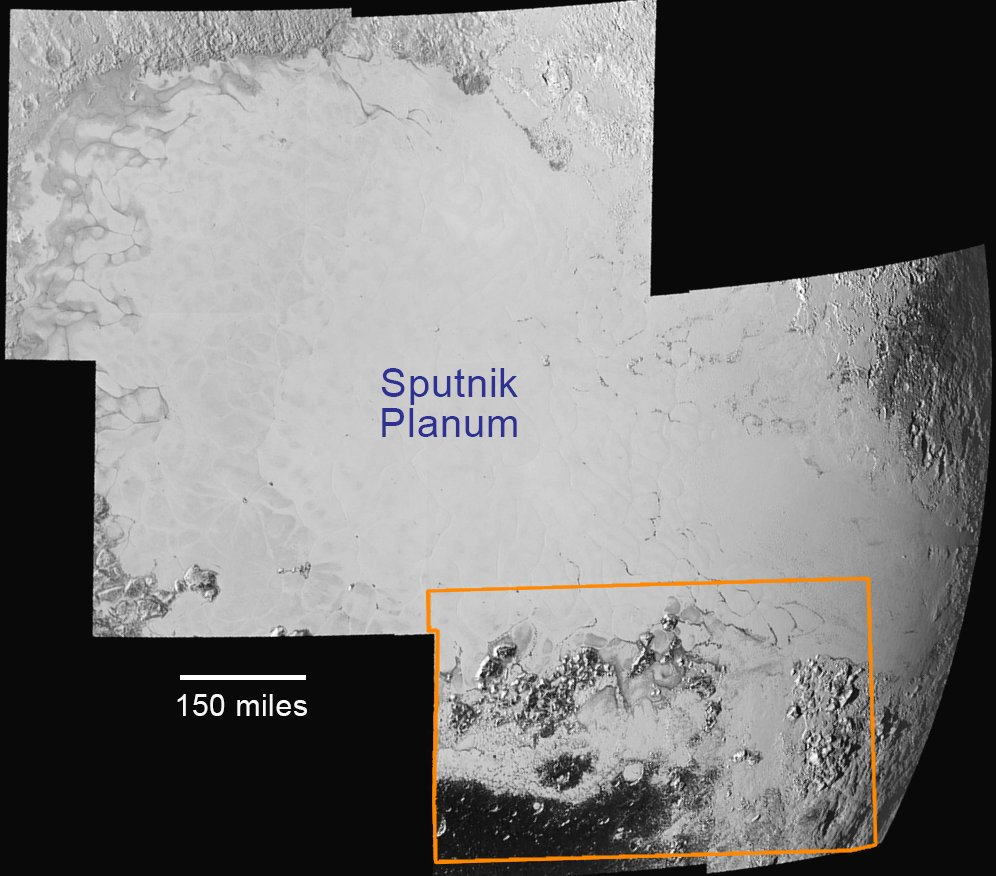
Hillary Montes and Tenzing Montes
(context; 14 July 2015)

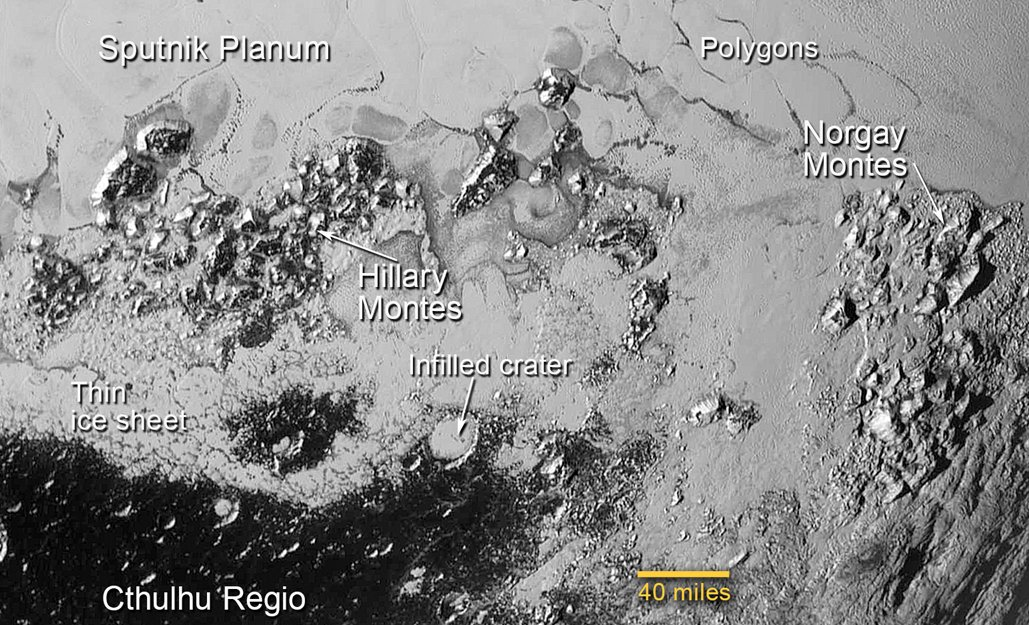
Hillary Montes and Tenzing Montes on Pluto
(context; 14 July 2015).
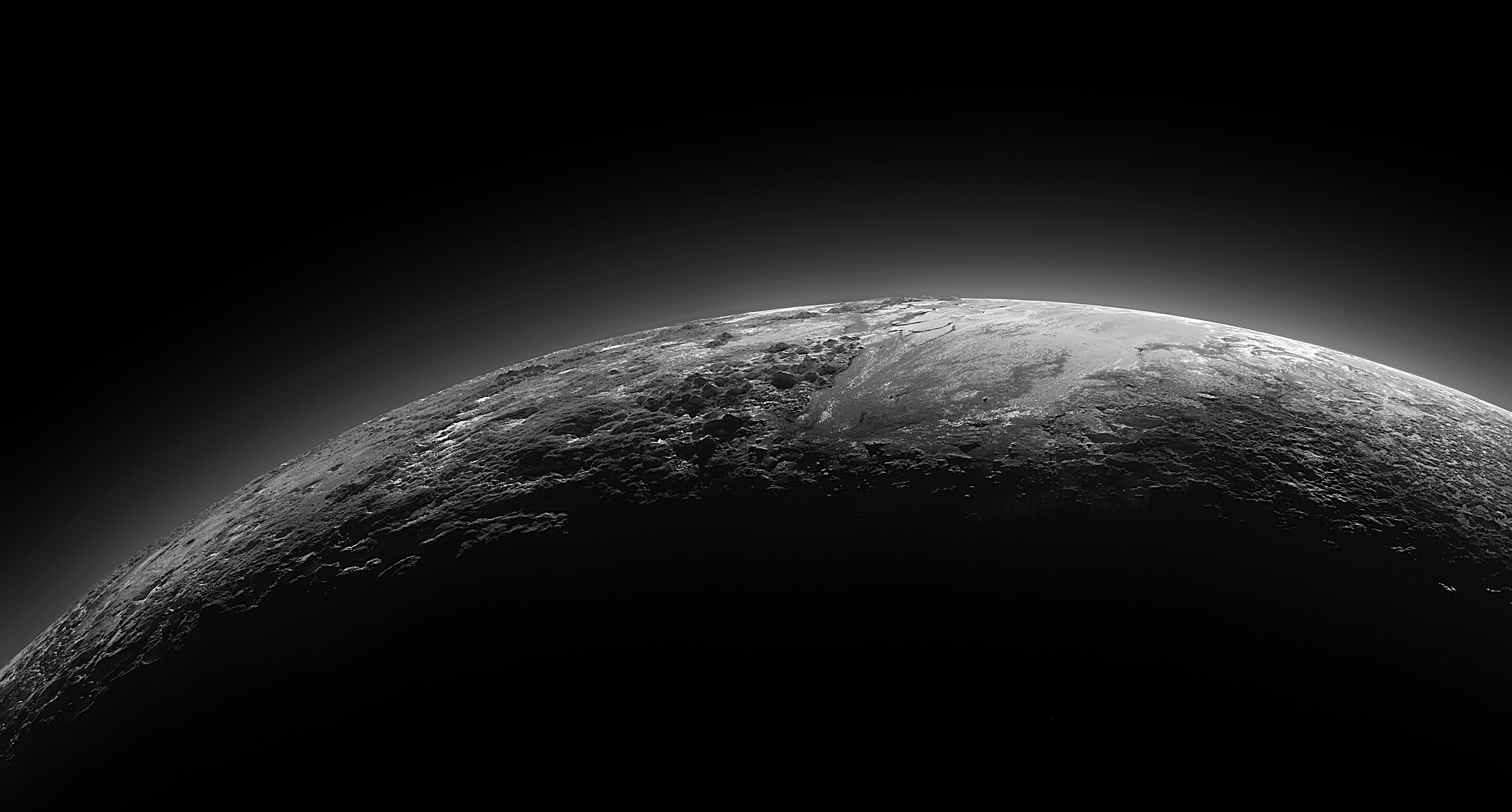
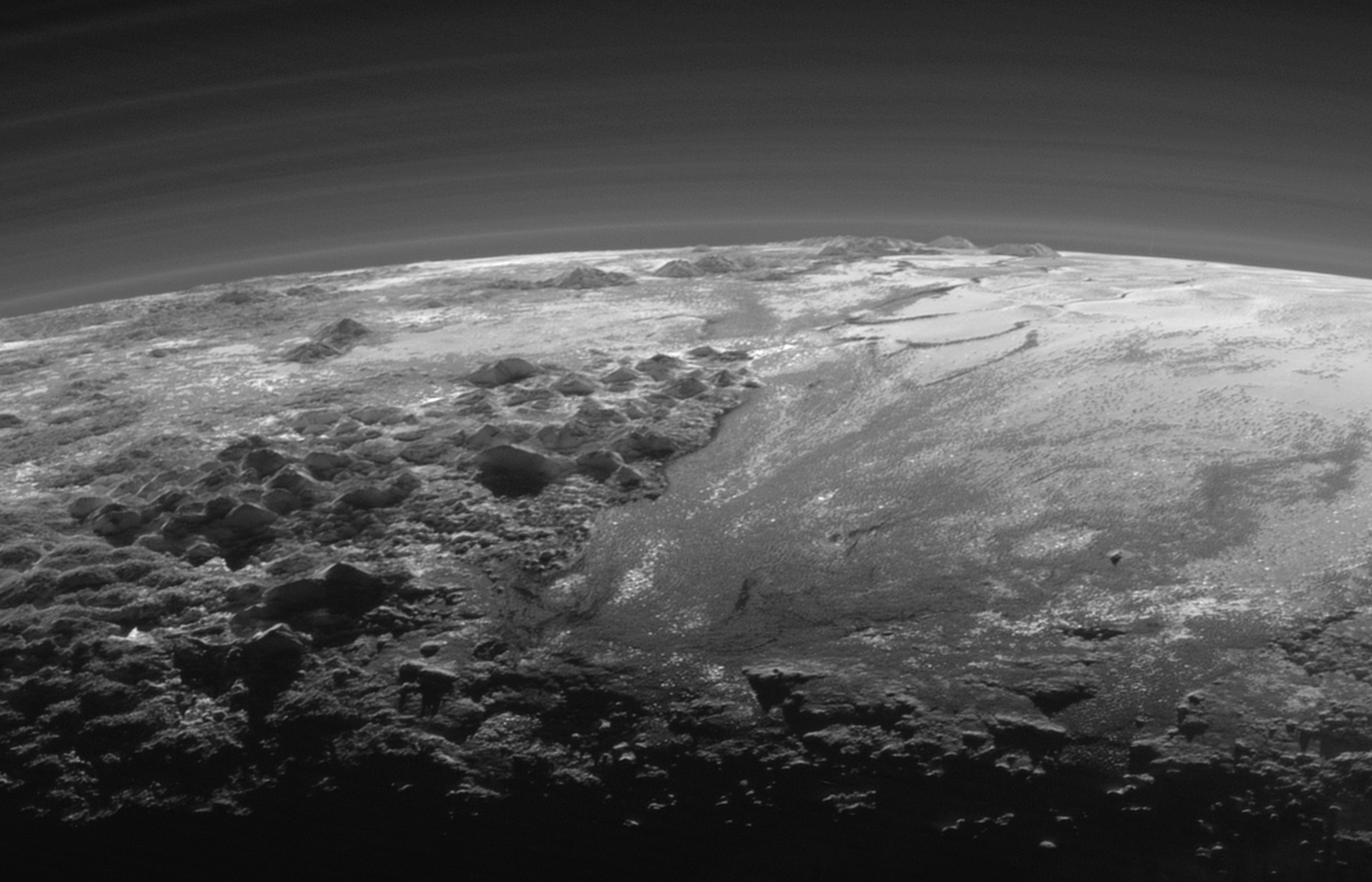
Pluto - Tenzing Montes (left foreground); Hillary Montes (skyline); Sputnik Planitia (right)
Near-sunset view includes several layers of atmospheric haze.

=== Videos ===
Pluto flyover (14 July 2015)

(00:30; released 18 September 2015)

(00:50; released 5 December 2015)

== See also ==
- Geography of Pluto
- Geology of Pluto
- List of geological features on Pluto
- List of tallest mountains in the Solar System
