= Sputnik Planitia =

Glaciated basin on Pluto

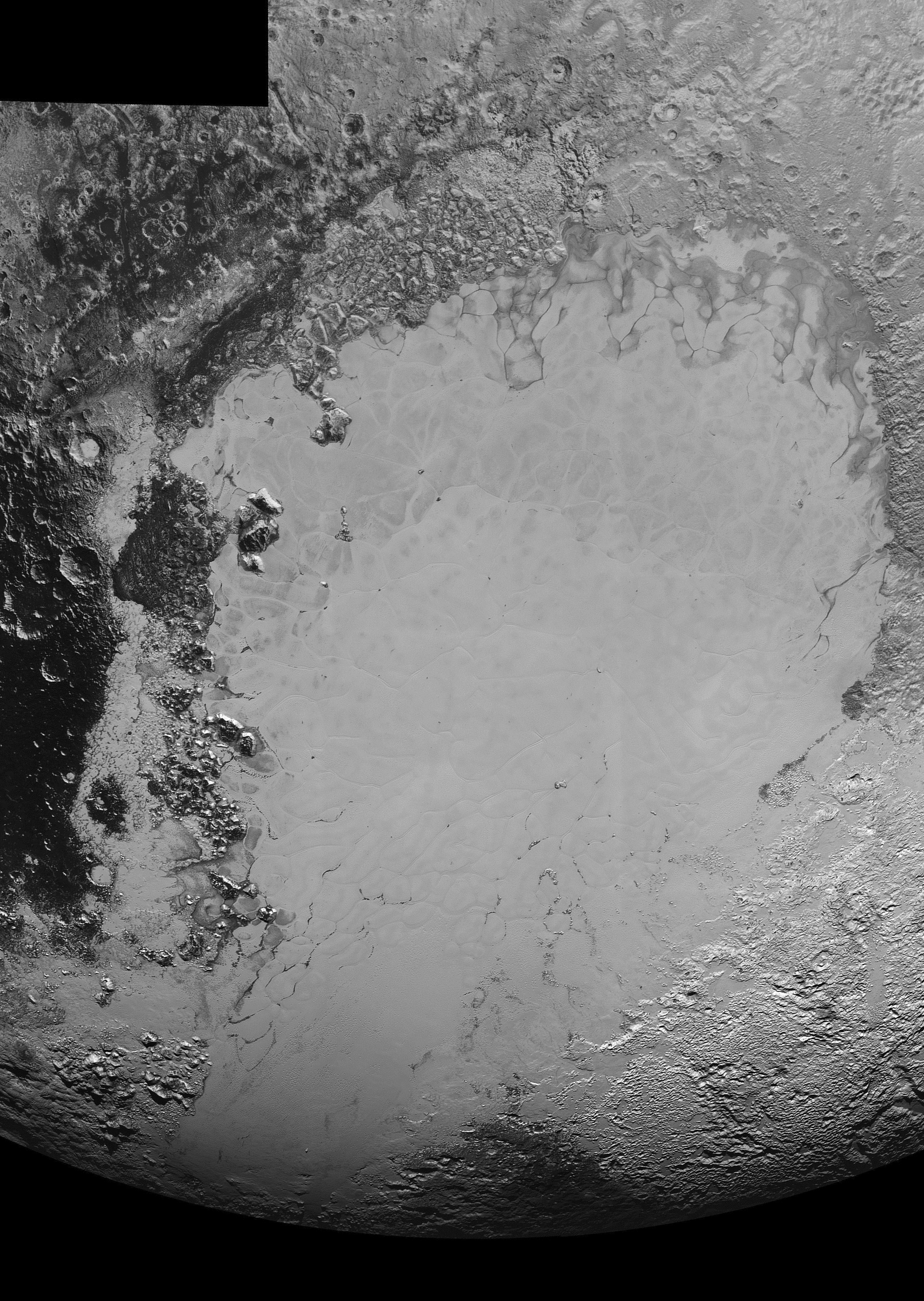
- New Horizons mosaic of the Sputnik Planitia basin
- Feature type: Planitia, impact basin
- Location: Tombaugh Regio, Pluto
- Coordinates: 20°N 180°E
- Diameter: 1492 km ~1300 km basin diameter
- Surface area: c. 5,278,000 km^{2} (Note: Calculated using the dimensions provided by MgGovern, White, and Schenk, and the formula for the area of an ellipse: $$A_\text{ellipse} = \pi ab$$)
- Dimensions: c. 1,400 x 1,200 km (Note: Glaciated terrain does not cover the entirety of the Sputnik Planitia impact basin)
- Age: c. 180,000 years
- Discoverer: New Horizons
- Eponym: Sputnik 1

Sputnik Planitia /ˈspʌtnɪk pləˈnɪʃiə, ˈspʊt-/ (formerly Sputnik Planum) is a large, partially glaciated basin on Pluto. About 1,400 by 1,200 km (870 by 750 mi) in size, Sputnik Planitia is partially submerged in large, bright glaciers of nitrogen ice. Named after Earth's first artificial satellite, Sputnik 1, it constitutes the western lobe of the heart-shaped Tombaugh Regio. Sputnik Planitia lies mostly in the northern hemisphere, but extends across the equator. Much of it has a surface of irregular polygons separated by troughs, interpreted as convection cells in the relatively soft nitrogen ice. The polygons average about 33 km (21 mi) across. In some cases troughs are populated by blocky mountains or hills, or contain darker material. There appear to be windstreaks on the surface with evidence of sublimation. The dark streaks are a few kilometers long and all aligned in the same direction. The planitia also contains pits apparently formed by sublimation. No craters were detectable by New Horizons, implying a surface less than 10 million years old. Modeling sublimation pit formation yields a surface age estimate of 180000+90000
−40000 years. Near the northwest margin is a field of transverse dunes (perpendicular to the windstreaks), spaced about 0.4 to 1 km apart, that are thought to be composed of 200–300 μm diameter particles of methane ice derived from the nearby Al-Idrisi Montes.

== Composition ==
The ice composing the basin is thought to consist primarily of nitrogen ice, with smaller fractions of carbon monoxide and methane ice, although relative proportions are uncertain. At Pluto's ambient temperature of 38 K (−235.2 °C; −391.3 °F), nitrogen and carbon monoxide ices are denser and much less rigid than water ice, making glacial-like flows possible; nitrogen ice is the most volatile. The nitrogen ice of the basin rests on Pluto's crust mostly composed of much more rigid water ice.

== Origin ==
Sputnik Planitia likely originated as an impact basin that subsequently collected volatile ices. The size of the hypothetical impactor has been estimated as 150–300 km. Alternatively, it has been suggested that the accumulation of ices in this location depressed the surface there, leading to the formation of a basin via a positive feedback process without an impact. The accumulation of several kilometers of nitrogen ice in the basin was in part a consequence of its higher surface pressure, which leads to a higher N_{2} condensation temperature. The positive temperature gradient of Pluto's atmosphere contributes to making a topographic depression a cold trap.

The terrain on Pluto antipodal to Sputnik Planitia may have been altered by the focusing there of seismic energy from the formative impact. While this suggestion is tentative in view of the poor resolution of the imaging of the antipodal region, the concept is similar to what has been proposed for areas antipodal to the Caloris basin on Mercury and Mare Orientale on the Moon.

A high seasonal thermal inertia of Pluto's surface is an important driver of deposition of nitrogen ice at low latitudes. These latitudes receive less annual insolation than Pluto's polar regions due to its high obliquity (122.5°). The coldest regions on Pluto, on average, are at 30° N. and S. latitude; early in Pluto's history, ice would tend to accumulate at these latitudes in a runaway process due to the positive feedback association of increased albedo, cooling and further ice deposition (similar to the ice segregation that occurred on Iapetus). Simulations suggest that over a period of about a million years, the runaway process would collect much of the ice into a single cap even in the absence of a preexisting basin.

The accumulation of dense nitrogen ice would have contributed to making Sputnik Planitia a positive gravity anomaly, but by itself would not have been sufficient to overcome the topographic depression associated with the basin. However, other effects of an impact event (see below) could have also contributed to such an anomaly. A positive gravity anomaly could have caused polar wander, reorienting the spin axis of Pluto to put the planitia near the Pluto-Charon tidal axis (the minimum-energy configuration). Sputnik Planitia is presently close to the anti-Charon point on Pluto, a result that has less than a 5% probability of arising by chance.

If Sputnik Planitia was created by an impact, then explaining the positive gravity anomaly requires the presence of a subsurface liquid water ocean below Pluto's water ice crust; isostatic uplift of the thinned crust and consequent intrusion of denser liquid water below the basin would account for most of the anomaly. Gradual freezing of such an ocean, in combination with polar wander and the loading of Sputnik Planitia with ice, would also explain the extensional tectonic features seen across Pluto. Alternatively, if the accumulation of ice in a single cap (without an impact) created a positive gravity anomaly that reoriented Pluto prior to formation of a basin, the tidal bulge raised by Charon might then have maintained Pluto's orientation even if the positive anomaly later disappeared.

The creation of the gravity anomaly is thought to require thinning the ice crust by ~90 km below Sputnik Planitia. However, the crust must be kept cool to maintain such variations in its thickness. Modeling has suggested that this can be explained if underneath Pluto's water ice crust is a layer of methane hydrate. This clathrate has insulating properties; its thermal conductivity is about 5–10 times less than that of water ice (it also has a viscosity roughly an order of magnitude greater than that of water ice). The additional insulation would help to maintain the layer of water below it in a liquid state, as well as keep the ice crust above it cool. A similar mechanism may contribute to the formation of subsurface oceans on other outer Solar System satellites and trans-Neptunian objects.

== Convection cells ==
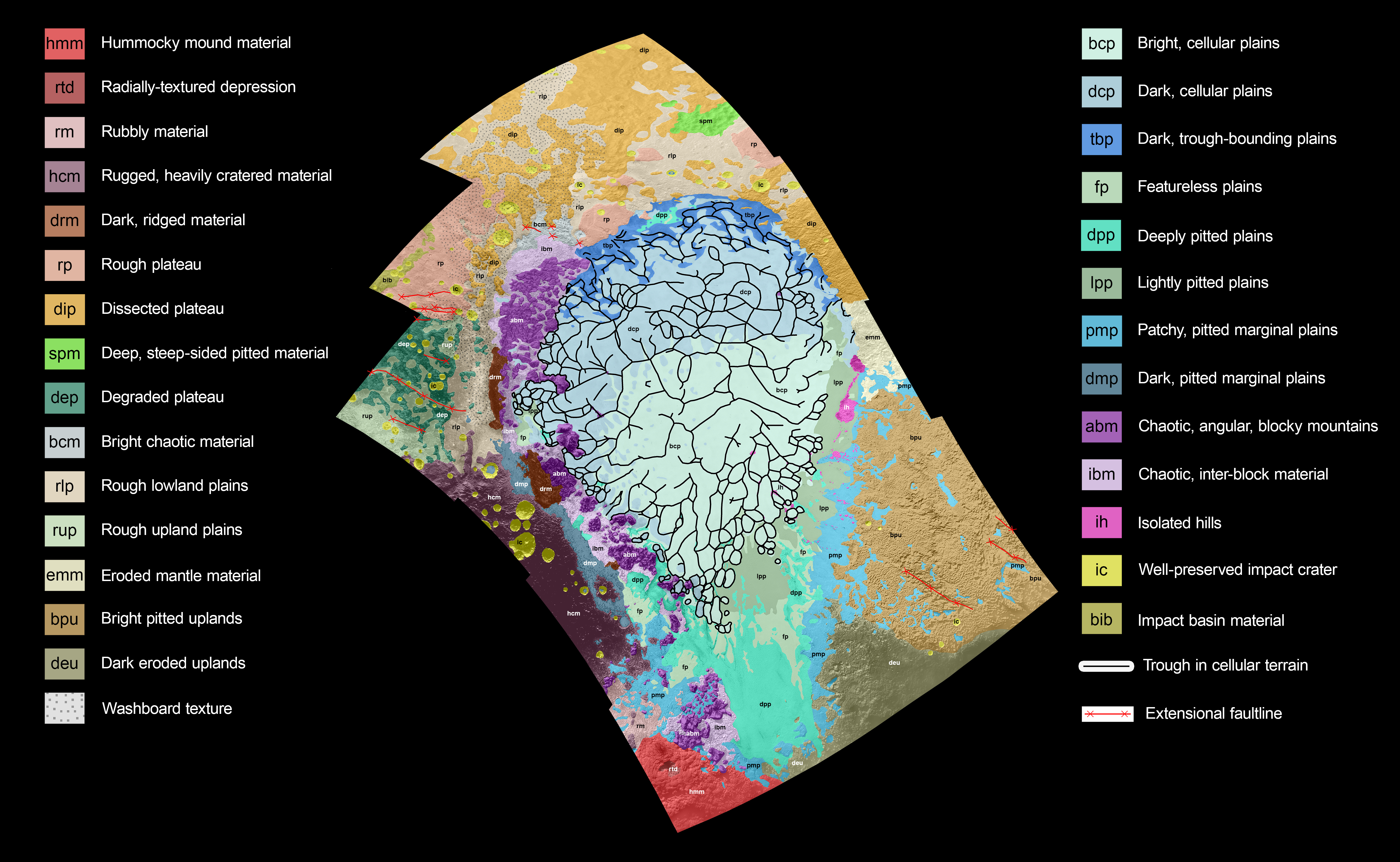
Geologic map of Sputnik Planitia and surroundings (context), with convection cell margins outlined in black

The polygonal structure is a sign of convection of the nitrogen/carbon monoxide ice, with ice warmed by heat from the interior welling up in the center of cells, spreading and then sinking at the ridged margins. Convection cells have about 100 meters of vertical relief, with the highest points being at their centers. Modeling of nitrogen ice convection cells suggests a depth of about one tenth their width, or 3–4 km for most of the planitia, and a maximum flow rate of about 7 cm per year. Cell margins can become pinched off and abandoned as cells evolve. Many of the cells are covered by sublimation pits. These pits grow larger by sublimation during transport from the centers to the edges of convection cells. Using their size distribution, scientists have estimated a convection velocity of 13.8+4.8
−3.8 cm per year, implying a surface age of 180000+90000
−40000 years. Other scientists have proposed that sublimation at the surface of the planitia is responsible for its convection by cooling the surface through latent heat consumption, instead of the driving source from the core originally proposed.

Other obvious indications of ice flow visible in images of the planitia include examples of valley-type glaciers flowing down into the basin from adjacent eastern highlands (the right lobe of Tombaugh Regio), presumably in response to deposition of nitrogen ice there, as well as ice from the planitia flowing into and filling adjacent depressions. The planitia has numerous blocky hills (one to several km across) that form aggregations at cell margins up to 20 km across; these may represent floating chunks of detached water ice crust that were carried onto the planitia by glacial flow and were then collected into troughs by the convection. In some cases the hills seem to form chains along the entry paths of glaciers. The hills may also congregate in nonconvecting regions when they get stuck at locations where the nitrogen ice becomes too shallow.

The planitia has numerous pits that are thought to result from fracturing and sublimation of nitrogen ice; these pits also collect in the margins of convection cells. Often the bottoms of the pits are dark, which may represent an accumulation of tholins left behind by the subliming ice, or a dark substrate below the planitia, if the pits penetrate all the way through the ice. In regions of the planitia where convection cells are not apparent, the pits are more numerous.

== Bordering montes ==
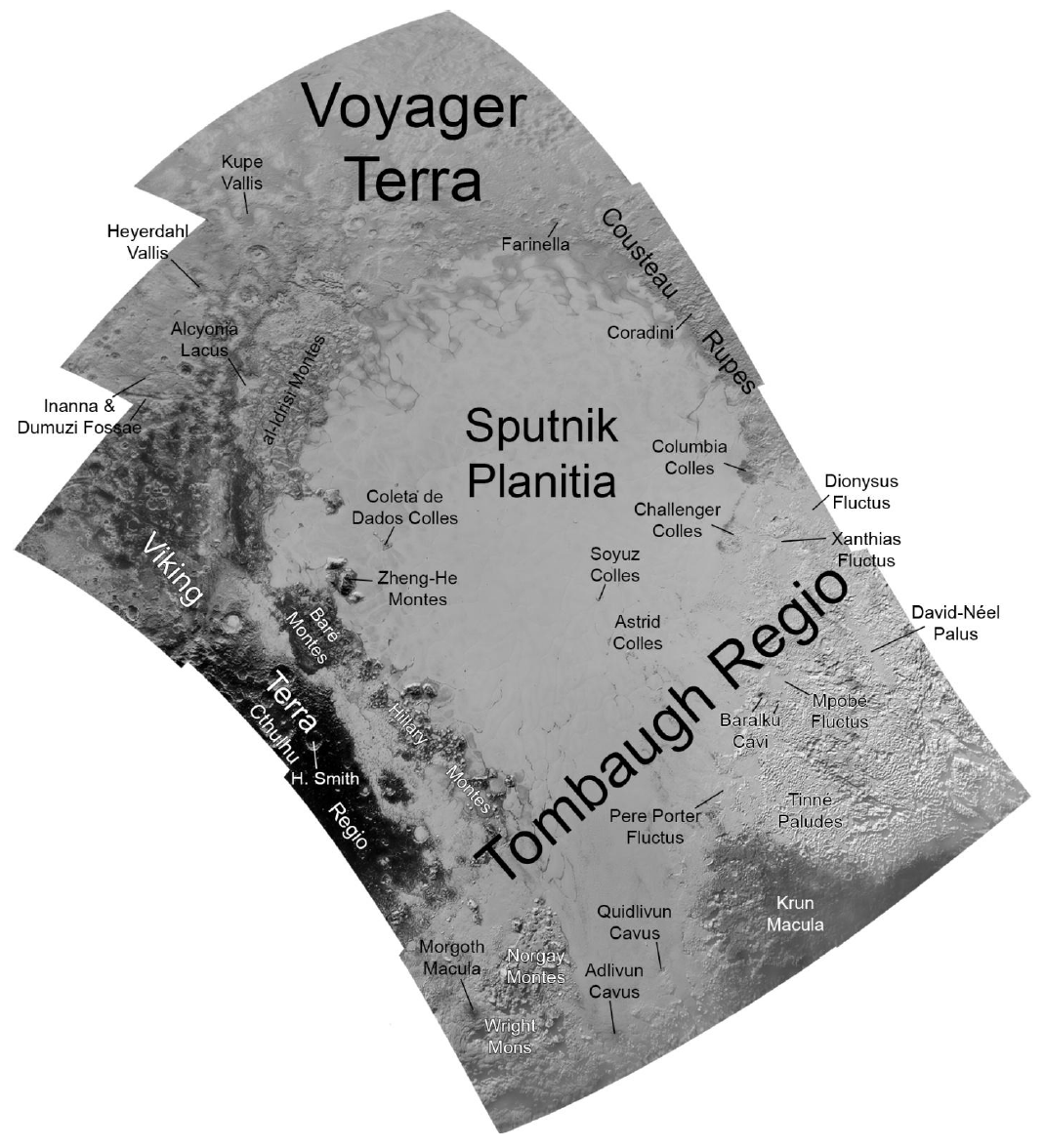
Annotated map of Sputnik Planitia and surrounding features

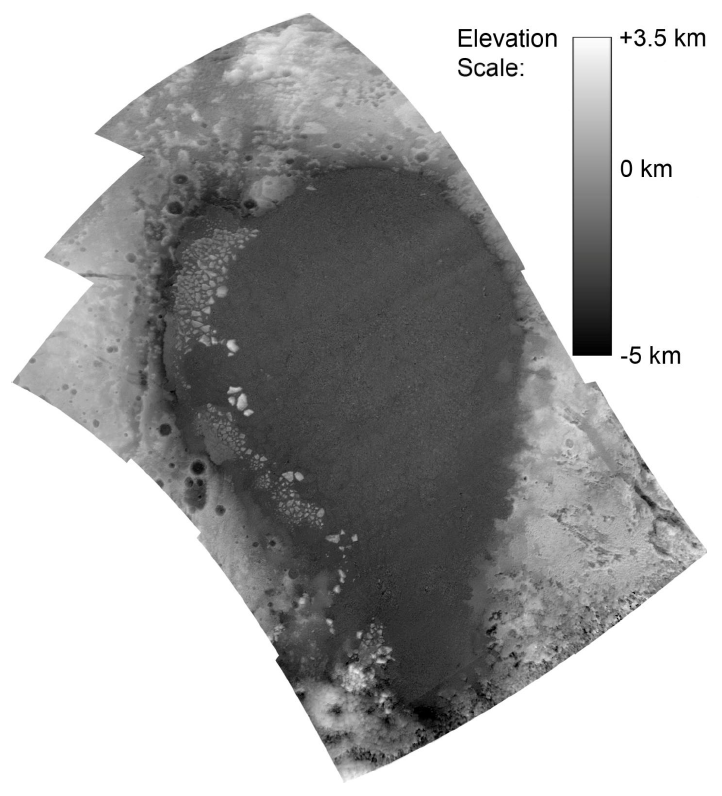
A topographic image of the Sputnik Planitia basin, showing the rising scarps bordering the glacial plains. The banding is an artefact of the camera.

On its northwest, Sputnik Planitia is bordered by a chaotic set of blocky mountains, the al-Idrisi Montes, which may have formed via the collapse of adjacent water ice highlands onto the planitia.

On its southwest, the planitia is bordered by the Hillary Montes, rising 1.6 km (0.99 mi; 5,200 ft) above the surface, and, further south, the Tenzing Montes, rising 3.4 km (2.1 mi; 11,000 ft) above the surface. These mountains also have a chaotic, blocky character. The mountains were named after Sir Edmund Hillary, New Zealand mountaineer, and Nepalese Sherpa mountaineer Tenzing Norgay, who were the first climbers to reach the summit of the highest peak on Earth, Mount Everest, on 29 May 1953. Some groups of hills in the basin are named after spacecraft; for example, "Coleta de Dados", in honor of the first Brazilian satellite launched into space.

Immediately to the southwest of the Tenzing Montes (context) is a large, circular mountain with a central depression, Wright Mons. It has been identified as a possible cryovolcano.

== Naming ==
The informal name Sputnik Planum was first announced by the New Horizons team on a press conference on 24 July 2015. A planum is a flat region of higher elevation (a plateau). When topographical data was analyzed in early 2016,it became clear that Sputnik is actually a basin, and the informal name was changed to Sputnik Planitia later that year. The name was still informal because it had not yet been adopted by the International Astronomical Union (IAU). On 7 September 2017, the name was officially approved together with the names of Tombaugh Regio and 12 other nearby surface features.

== See also ==
- Geography of Pluto
- Geology of Pluto
- List of geological features on Pluto
- List of largest craters in the Solar System
