= Tombaugh Regio =

Bright region on Pluto

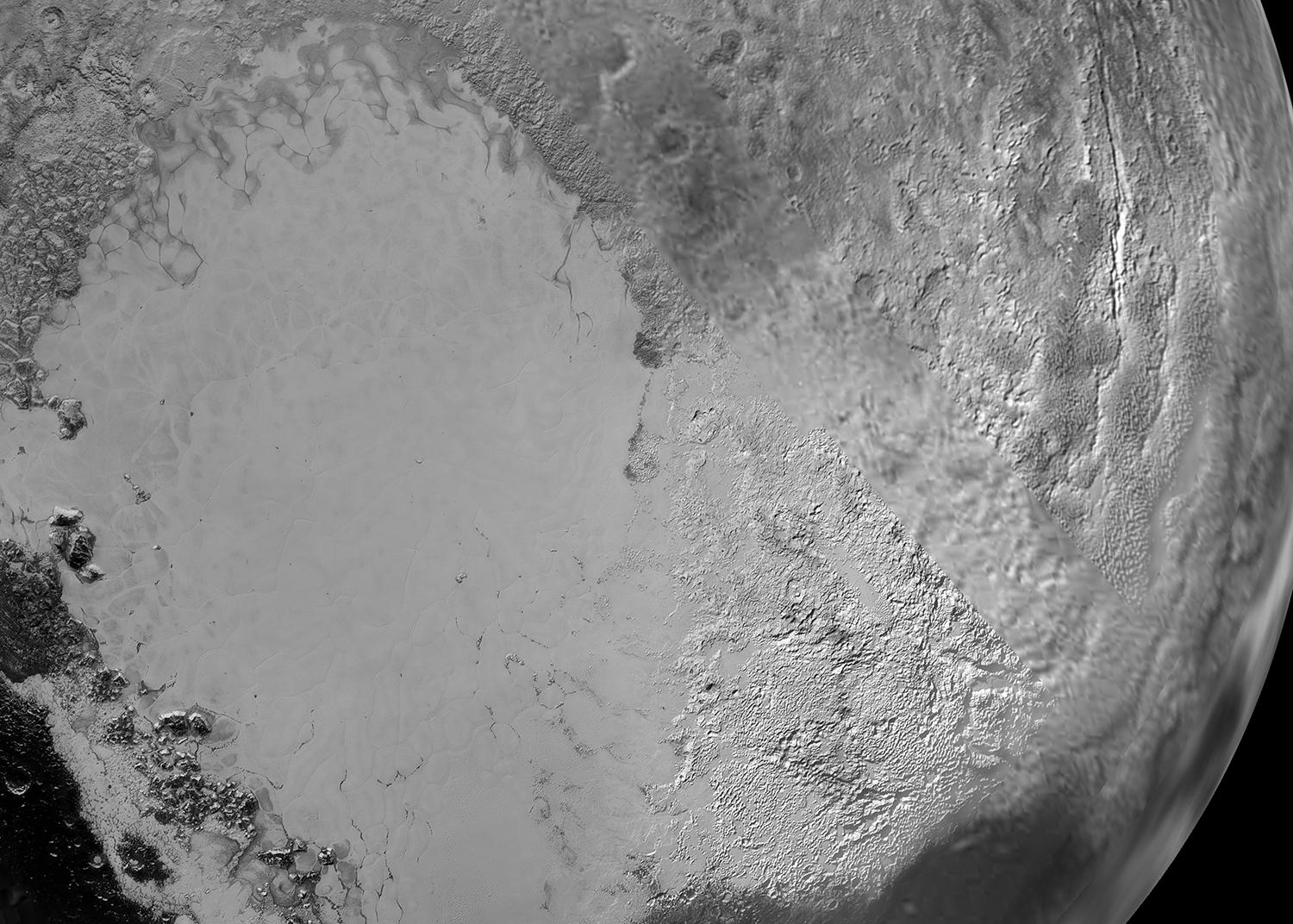
- A detailed view of Tombaugh Regio; a constructed mosaic of monochrome images by New Horizons.
- Feature type: Region
- Location: Anti-Charon hemisphere of Pluto
- Diameter: 1,590 km (990 mi)
- Discoverer: New Horizons
- Eponym: Clyde Tombaugh

Tombaugh Regio (/ˈtɒmbaʊ ˈrɛdʒioʊ/), sometimes nicknamed "Pluto's heart" after its shape, is the largest bright surface feature of the dwarf planet Pluto. It lies just north of Pluto's equator, to the northeast of Belton Regio and to the northwest of Safronov Regio, which are both dark features. Its western lobe, a 1,000-kilometre-wide (620-mile) plain of nitrogen and other ices lying within a basin, is named Sputnik Planitia. The eastern lobe consists of high-albedo uplands thought to be coated by nitrogen transported through the atmosphere from Sputnik Planitia, and then deposited as ice. Some of this nitrogen ice then returns to Sputnik Planitia via glacial flow. The region is named after Clyde Tombaugh, the discoverer of Pluto.

== Description ==
Tombaugh Regio is a large, light-colored region about 1,590 km (990 mi) across. The two lobes of the feature are geologically distinct. The western lobe, Sputnik Planitia, is smoother than the eastern, and they are of slightly different colors. Early speculation was that the western lobe may be a large impact crater filled with nitrogen snow. Bright spots within the region were initially speculated to be mountain peaks. Photos, released on 15 July 2015, revealed 3,400 m (11,000 ft) mountains made of water ice in the feature; they also showed no craters in this same region. Subsequent data indicated that the center of Sputnik Planitia is rich in nitrogen, carbon monoxide, and methane ices, and that features near the edges of the region show evidence of ice flow such as glaciers, and light material overlying the darker material at the eastern edge of Belton Regio. The surface of Sputnik Planitia is divided into polygonal convection cells and is less than 10 million years old, indicating that Pluto is geologically active.

The feature had been identified as a bright spot for six decades prior to the New Horizons flyby, although it was impossible to image it with enough resolution to determine its shape. Over these six decades the spot had been observed to be dimming.

In 2020, it was found that Tombaugh Regio controlled the wind circulation of Pluto, and could sculpt the landscape on its surface.

== Naming and shape ==
On 15 July 2015, the region was provisionally named "Tombaugh Regio" by the New Horizons team in honor of astronomer Clyde Tombaugh, the discoverer of Pluto, regio being Latin for "region". On 7 September 2017, the name was officially approved by the International Astronomical Union (IAU), together with names for 13 other surface features on Pluto.

NASA initially referred to the region as a "heart" in reference to its overall shape. Some people find that it also resembles the Disney character Pluto, an animated non-anthropomorphic dog which shares the name of the dwarf planet, in profile facing eastward. The Walt Disney Company acknowledged this perceived likeness in a short animation.

== Gallery ==
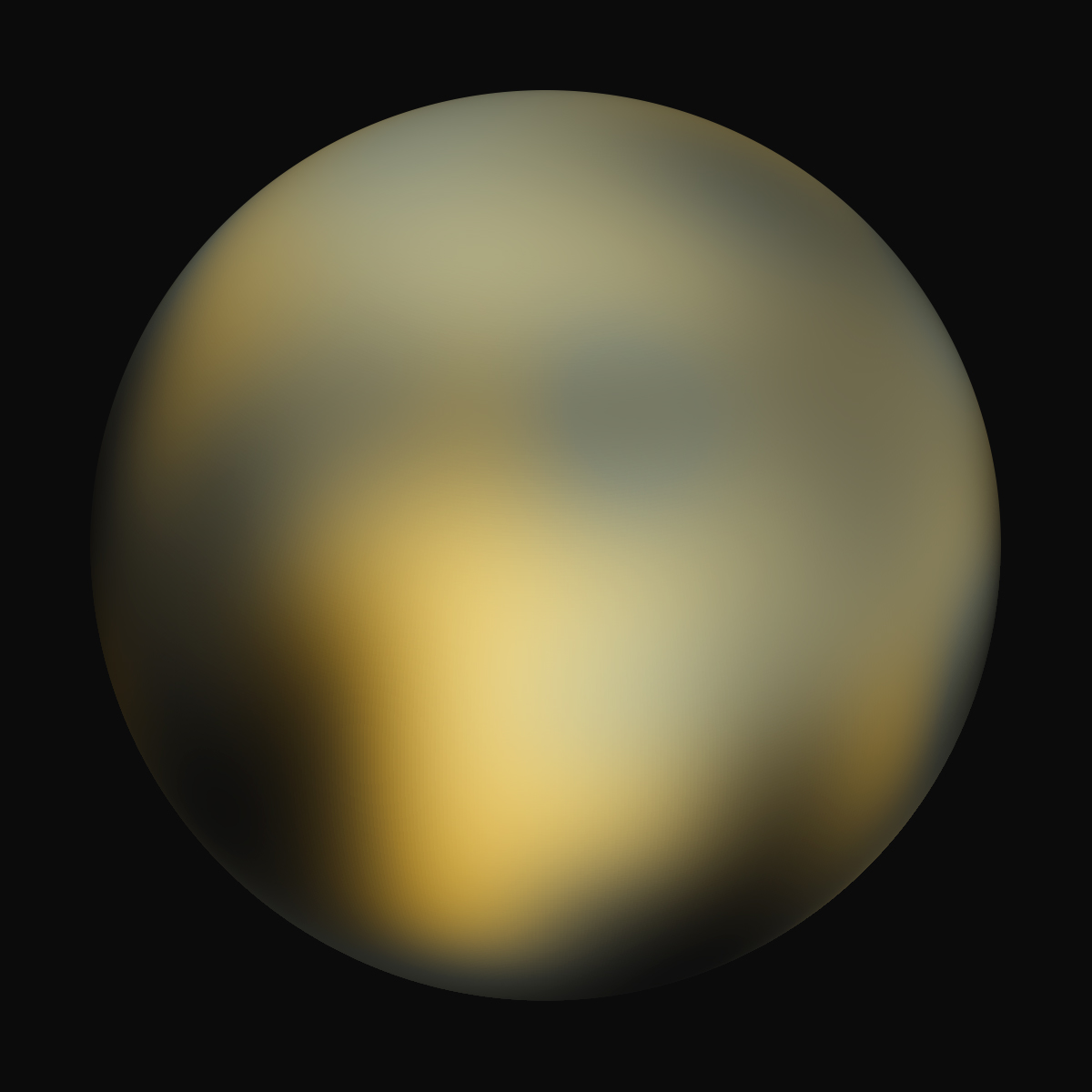
A 2010 map of Pluto reconstructed from Hubble Space Telescope data. Although it had not yet been named or identified as a distinct feature, Tombaugh Regio is discernible.

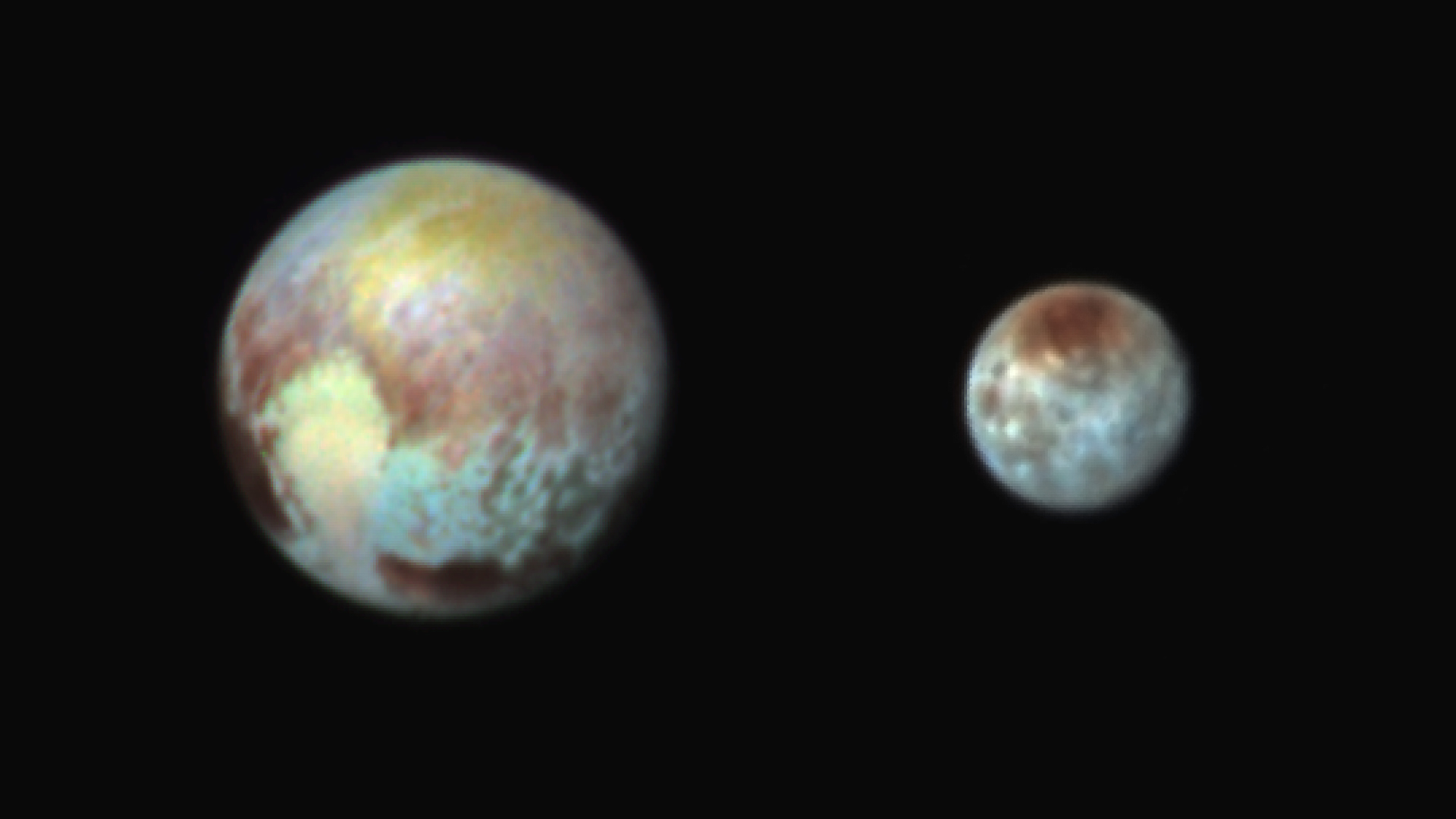
The two northern lobes of Tombaugh Regio can be seen to have different compositions in this false-color image
(13 July 2015).

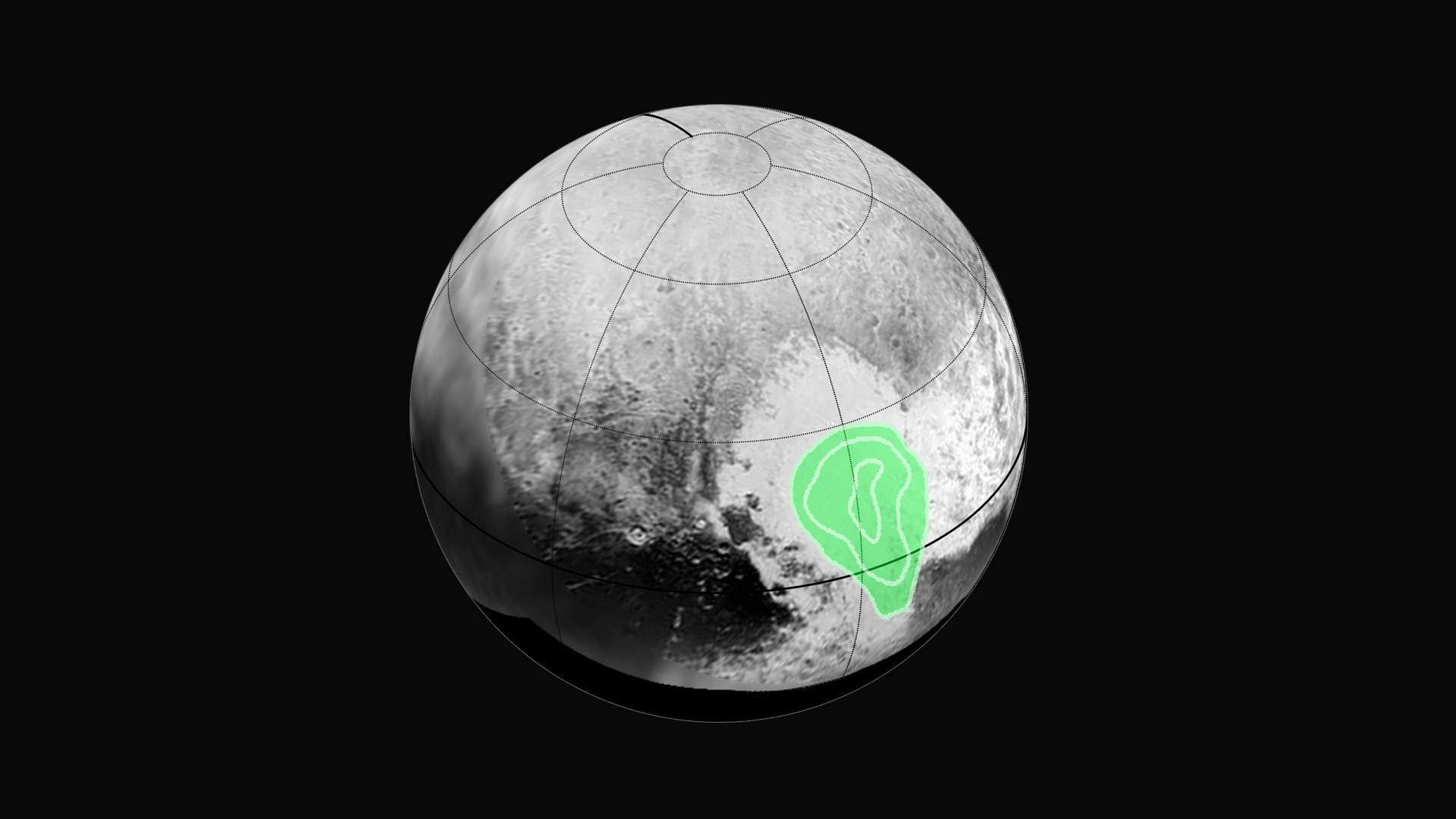
Carbon monoxide ice on Pluto (green) is concentrated in Sputnik Planitia.
(14 July 2015).
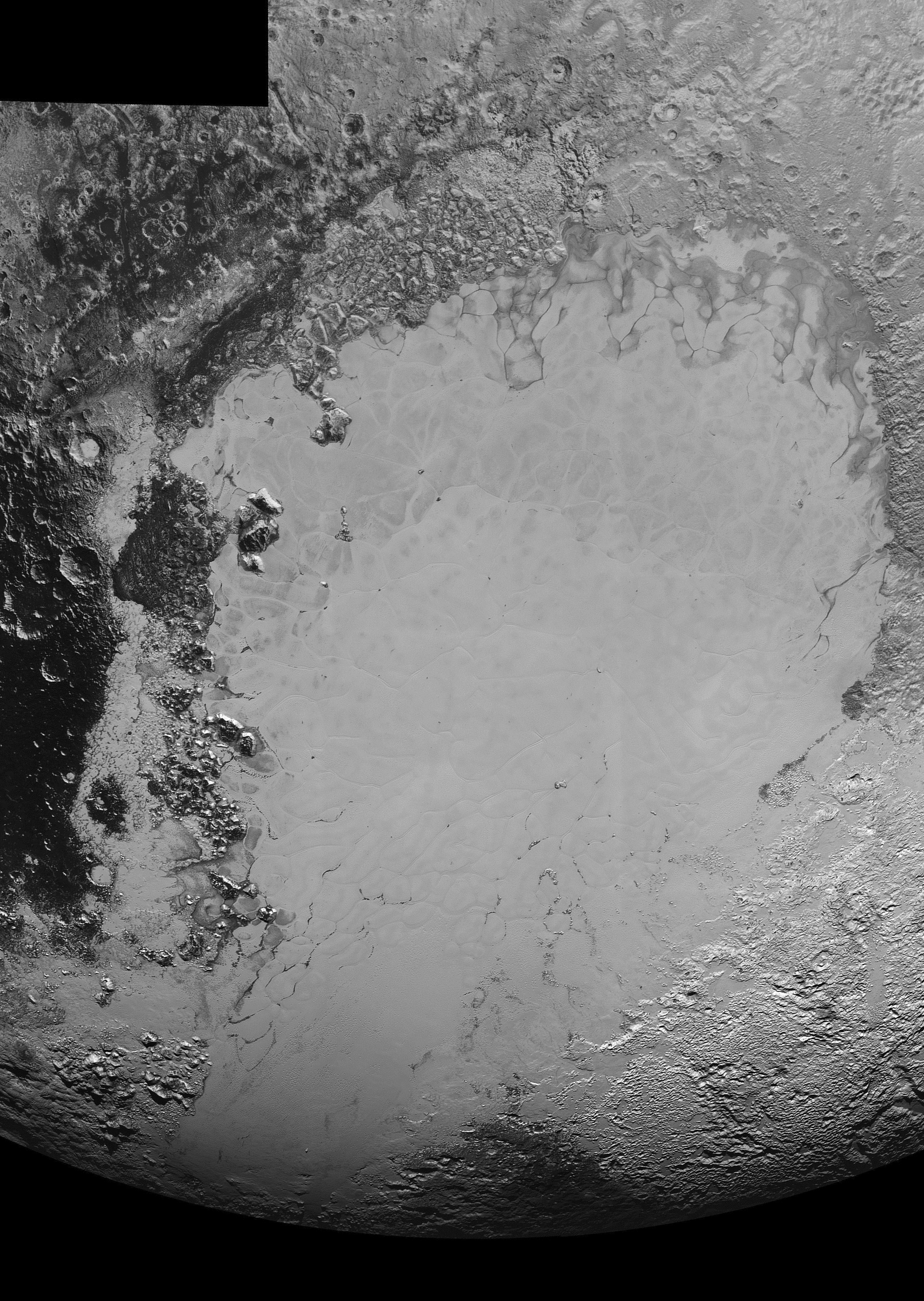
Mosaic of left lobe of Tombaugh Regio, showing the young plain Sputnik Planitia plus mountains to the south (Norgay Montes) and southwest (Hillary Montes), near the east margin of the older, dark cratered terrain of Belton Regio.

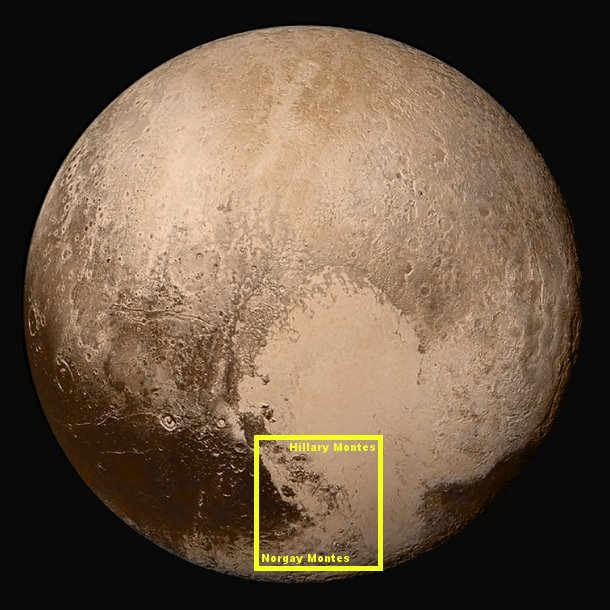
Pluto – location of Hillary Montes and Norgay Montes
(context; 14 July 2015).

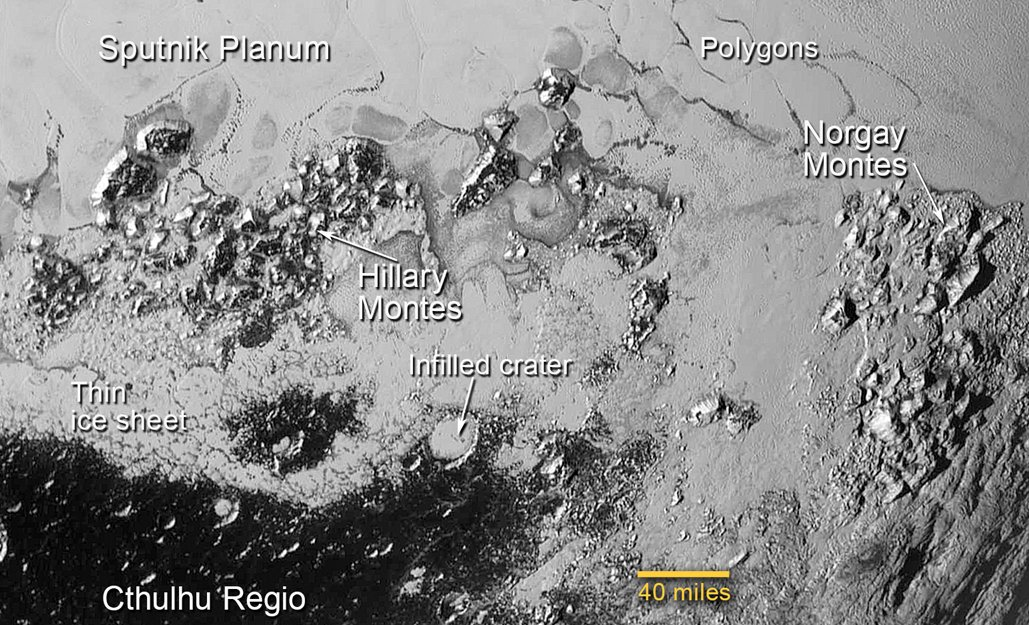
Hillary Montes and Norgay Montes
(14 July 2015).
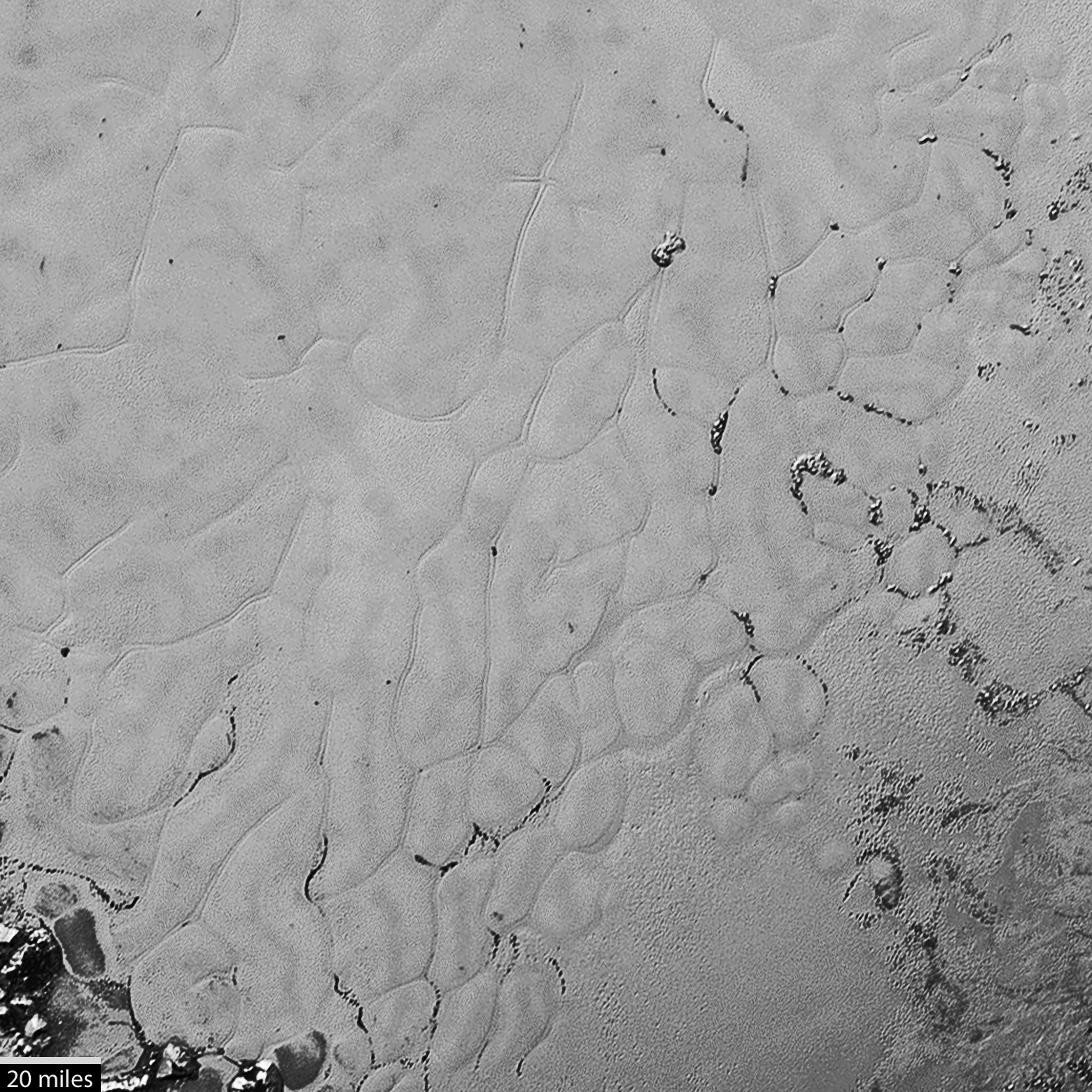
Close-up photograph (context) showing polygonal convection cells in the nitrogen ice of Sputnik Planitia, the western lobe of Tombaugh Regio
(14 July 2015).

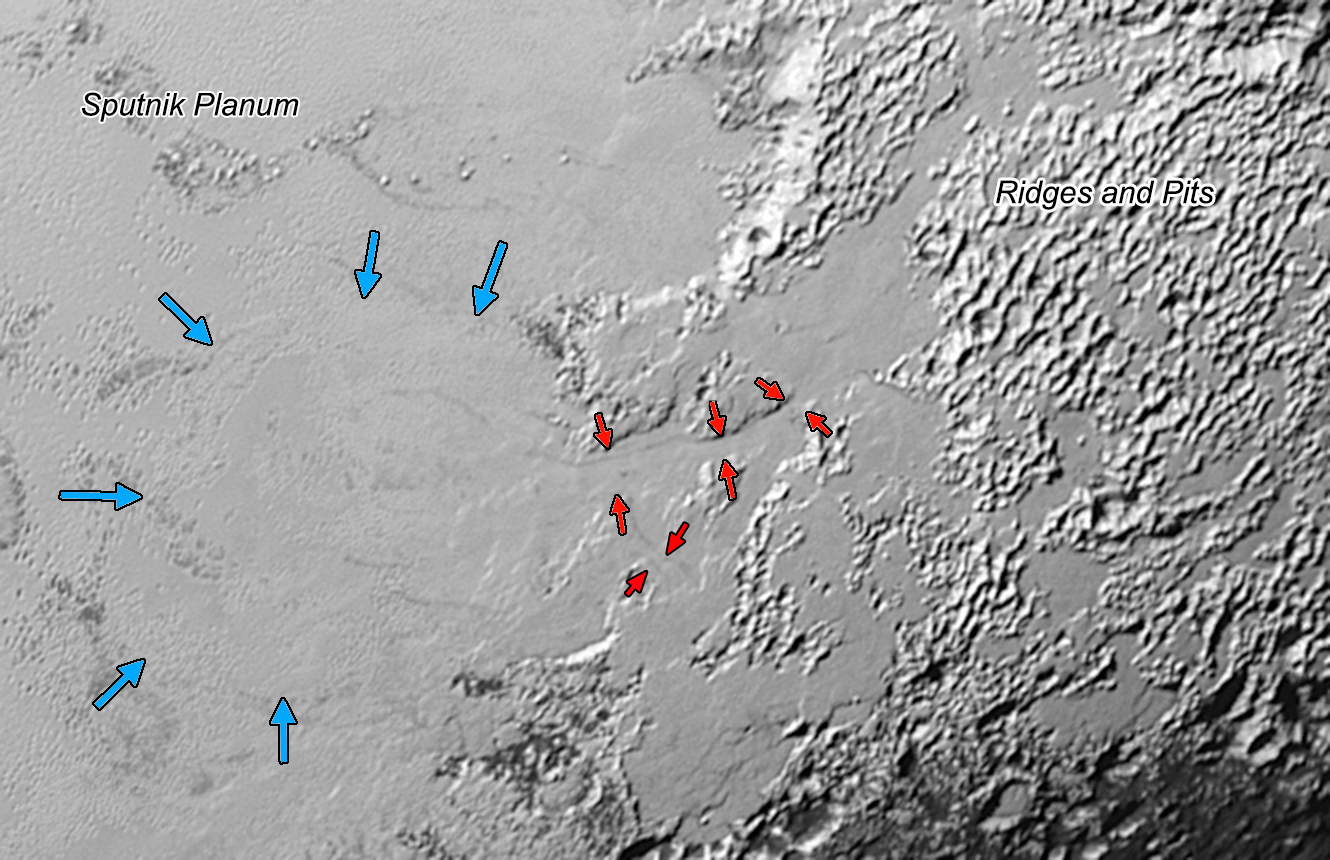
Glaciers return nitrogen ice from the eastern, upland, lobe of Tombaugh Regio through valleys into Sputnik Planitia on the west (context); red arrows show valley widths, blue arrows an apparent flow front on the planitia
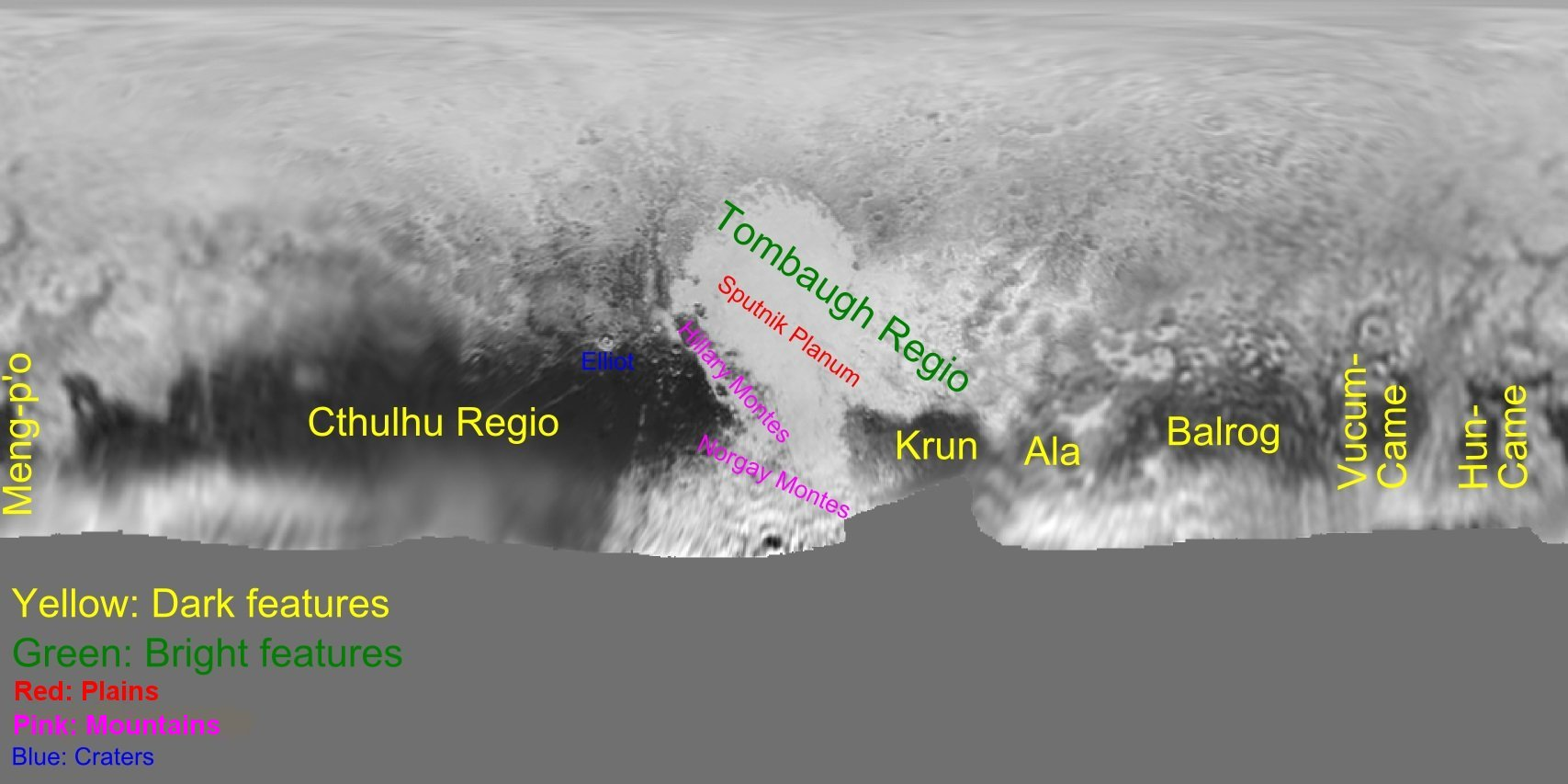
Pluto - map features
(context; 14 July 2015).
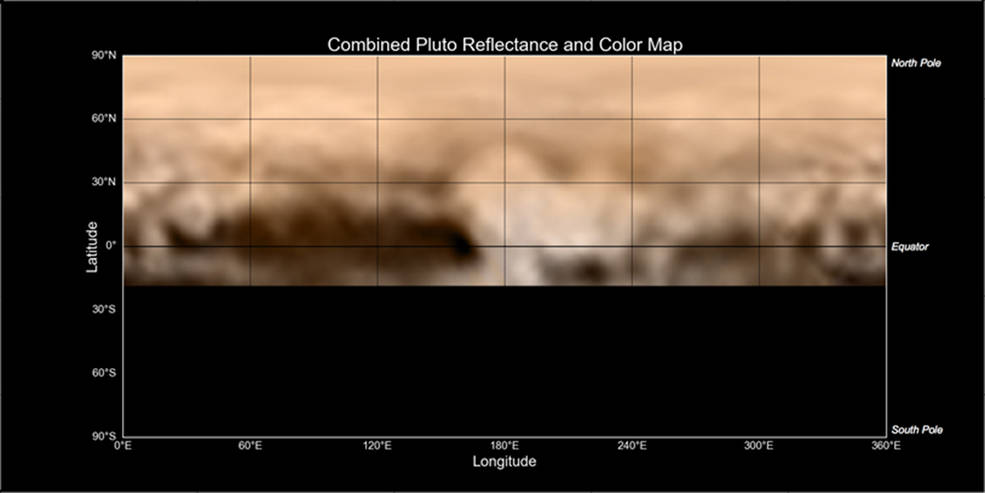
Pluto - Tombaugh Regio is prominent near the center of this map, which also gives coordinates.

== See also ==
- Geography of Pluto
- List of geological features on Pluto
