= Artificial Intelligence Cold War =

Geopolitical narrative

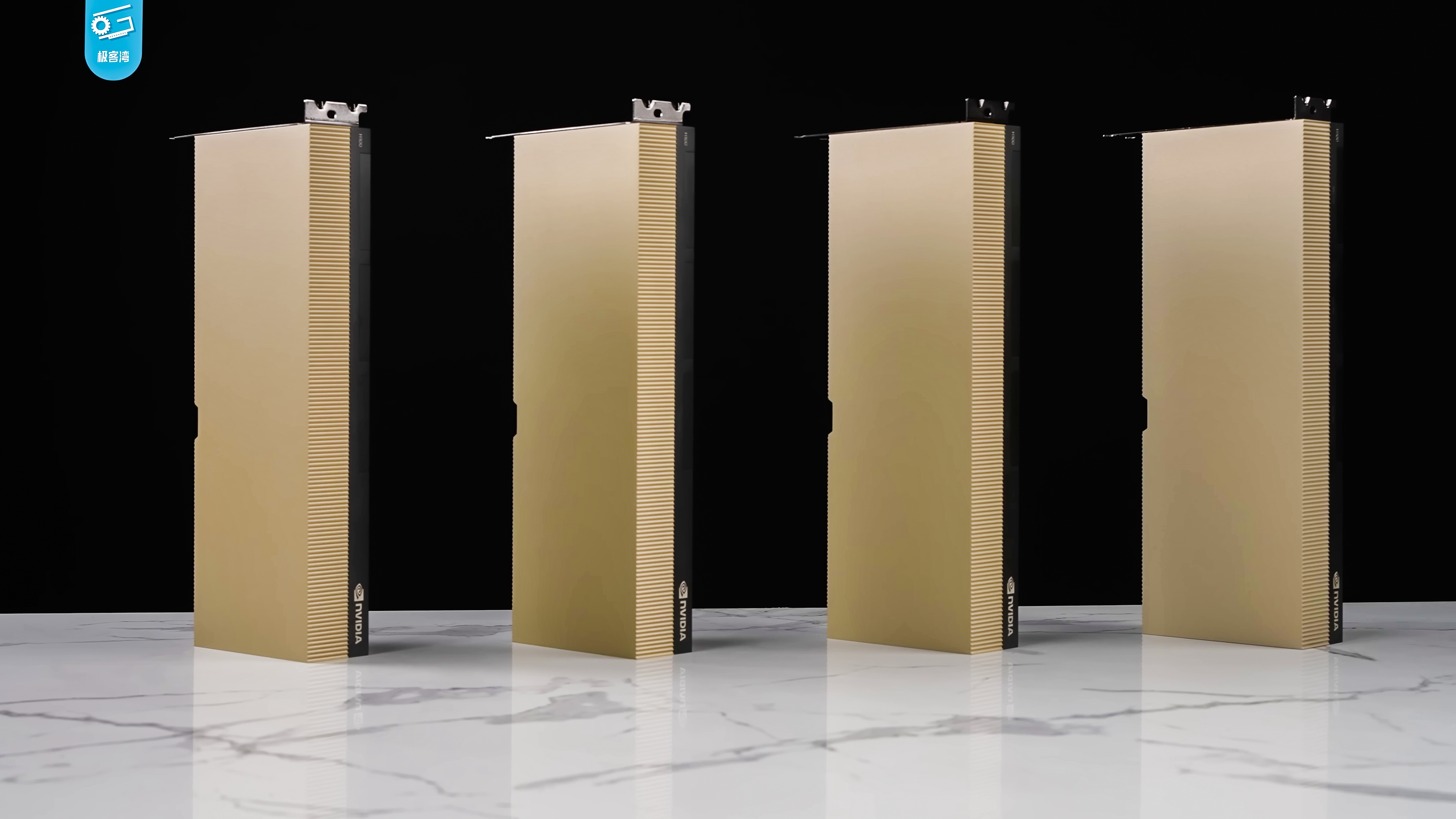
- Four NVIDIA H100 GPUs, one model of GPUs affected by US export controls of technology useful for the development of artificial intelligence
- Date: 2018–present
- Participants: United States; China
- Type: Technological and geopolitical great power competition
- Theme: AI Arms Race, Second Cold War
- Cause: Geopolitical great power competition
- Associated legislation: United States: Export Control Reform Act (2018); CHIPS and Science Act (2022); BIS Semiconductor Export Controls (2022, 2023); Executive Order 14110 (2023); Executive Order 14105 (2023); BIS AI "Diffusion Rule" (2025); China: PRC Export Control Law (2020); Generative AI Services Interim Measures (2023); Rare Earths and Magnet Export Restrictions (2025)

The Artificial Intelligence Cold War (AI Cold War) is a narrative in which geopolitical tensions between the United States and China could lead to a Second Cold War waged in the area of artificial intelligence technology rather than in the areas of nuclear capabilities or ideology. The context of the AI Cold War narrative is the AI arms race, which involves a build-up of military capabilities using AI technology by the US and China and the usage of increasingly advanced semiconductors which power those capabilities.

According to a February 2019 publication by the Center for a New American Security, General Secretary of the Chinese Communist Party Xi Jinping – believes that being at the forefront of AI technology will be critical to the future of China's global military and economic power competition.

== Origins of the term ==
The term AI Cold War first appeared in 2018 in an article in Wired magazine by Nicholas Thompson and Ian Bremmer. The two authors trace the emergence of the AI Cold War narrative to 2017, when China published its AI Development Plan, which included a strategy aimed at becoming the global leader in AI by 2030. While the authors acknowledge the use of AI by China to strengthen its authoritarian (totalitarian) rule, they warn against the perils for the US of engaging in an AI Cold War strategy. Thompson and Bremmer rather advocate for a technological cooperation between the US and China to encourage global standards in privacy and ethical use of AI.

Shortly after the publication of the article in Wired magazine, the former U.S. Treasury Secretary Hank Paulson referred to the emergence of an ‘Economic Iron Curtain’ between the US and China, reinforcing the new AI Cold War narrative.

== Proponents of the AI Cold War narrative ==
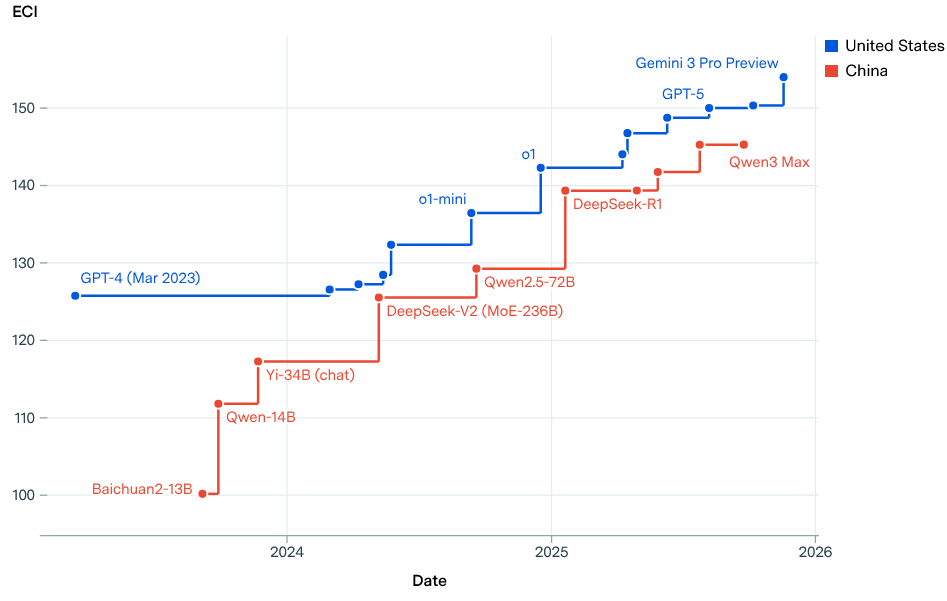
Comparison of AI frontier model development between the United States and China (2023–2026) based on the Epoch Capabilities Index (ECI). The chart illustrates a consistent lead by U.S. proprietary models (e.g., GPT-5, Gemini 3 Pro), while Chinese open-weight models (e.g., DeepSeek-R1, Qwen2.5) trail by an average of 7 months, with a lag ranging from 4 to 14 months.

Politico contributed to reinforcing the AI Cold War narrative. In 2020, the paper argued that because of the increasing AI capabilities of China, the US and other democratic countries have to create an alliance to stay ahead of China.

Former Google chief executive Eric Schmidt, together with Graham T. Allison alleged in an article in Project Syndicate that, in the context of the COVID-19 pandemic, the AI capabilities of China are ahead of the US in most critical areas.

Scientists who have immigrated to the U.S. play an outsize role in the country's development of AI technology. Many of them were educated in China, prompting debates about national security concerns amid worsening relations between the two countries.

Policy and technology experts have pointed to concerns about unethical use of AI which would be primarily associated with China. Ethics would therefore constitute a major ideological divide in the upcoming AI Cold War.

Fears around disrupting supply chains and a global semiconductor shortage are linked to Taiwan's critical role in the production of semiconductors. 70% of semiconductors are either produced in Taiwan or transfer through Taiwan, where TSMC, world's largest chipmaker is headquartered. The PRC does not recognize the sovereignty of Taiwan and trade restrictions by the US on companies selling semiconductors to the PRC have disrupted in the past the commercial relationships between TSMC and Huawei.

== Reactions to the AI Cold War ==
=== Review of the validity of the AI Cold War narrative ===
Academics and observers expressed concerns about the validity and soundness of the AI Cold War narrative. Denise Garzia expressed concern in Nature that the AI Cold War narrative will undermine the efforts by the US to establish global rules for AI ethics. Researchers have warned in MIT Technology Review that the breakdown in international collaboration in the area of science because of the threat of the alleged AI Cold War would be detrimental to progress. Additionally, the AI Cold War narrative impacts on many more areas including the planning of supply chains and the proliferation of AI. The dissemination of the AI Cold War narrative could therefore be costly and destructive and exacerbate existing tensions.

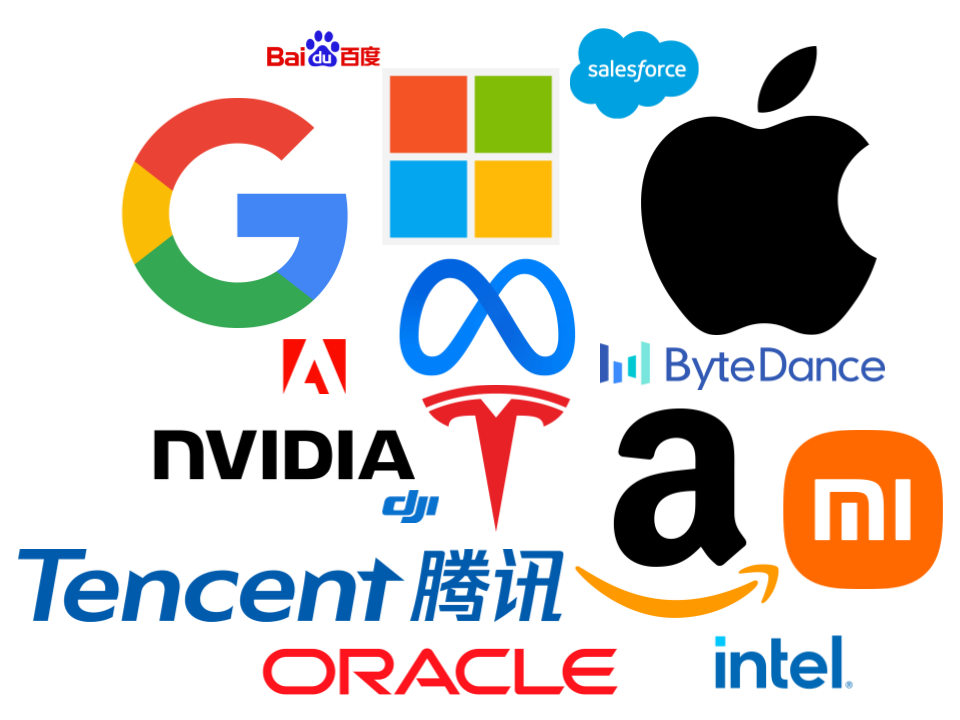
Large technology companies could have a commercial interest to push the AI Cold War narrative.

Joanna Bryson and Helena Malikova have pointed to Big Tech's potential interest in promoting the AI Cold War narrative, as technology companies lobby for less onerous regulation of AI in the US and the EU. A factual assessment of the existing AI capabilities of different countries shows a less binary reality than portrayed by the AI Cold War narrative. The AI Cold War started as a narrative but it could turn into a self-fulfilling prophecy and fuel an arms race, not only because of corporate interests but also because of the existing interests at different national security departments.

Regarding cyber power, the International Institute for Strategic Studies published a study in June 2021, which argued that the online capabilities of China have been exaggerated and that Chinese cyber power is at least a decade behind the US, largely due to lingering security issues.

=== Restrictions to trading with China ===
US politicians and European industry players have invoked the looming AI Cold War as a reason to ban procurement by public authorities in Europe of Huawei 5G technology due to concerns over the Chinese state-sponsored surveillance industry.

In 2019, the Trump administration successfully lobbied the Dutch government into stopping the Netherlands-based company ASML from exporting equipment to China. ASML manufactures a machine called an extreme ultraviolet lithography system used by semiconductor producers, including TSMC and Intel to produce state-of the-art microchips. The Biden administration adopted the same course of action as the Trump administration and requested the Netherlands to restrict sales by ASML to China, invoking national-security concerns.

The trade restrictions imposed by the Trump administration affected semiconductors imports from China to the US and raised concerns by the US industry that supply chains will be disrupted in case of an AI Cold War. This prompted US technology companies to develop mitigation strategies including hoarding semiconductors and trying to set up local semiconductor production facilities, with the support of government subsidies.

=== Industrial policy initiatives ===
==== United States ====
Member States of Pax Silica

In June 2021, the US Senate approved the U.S. Innovation and Competition Act providing around 250 billion US dollars public money support to the US technological and manufacturing industry. The alleged Chinese threat in the area of technology helped secure a strong bipartisan support for the new legislation, amounting to the largest industrial policy move by the US in decades. Chinese authorities reproached to the US that the bill was “full of cold war zero-sum thinking”.

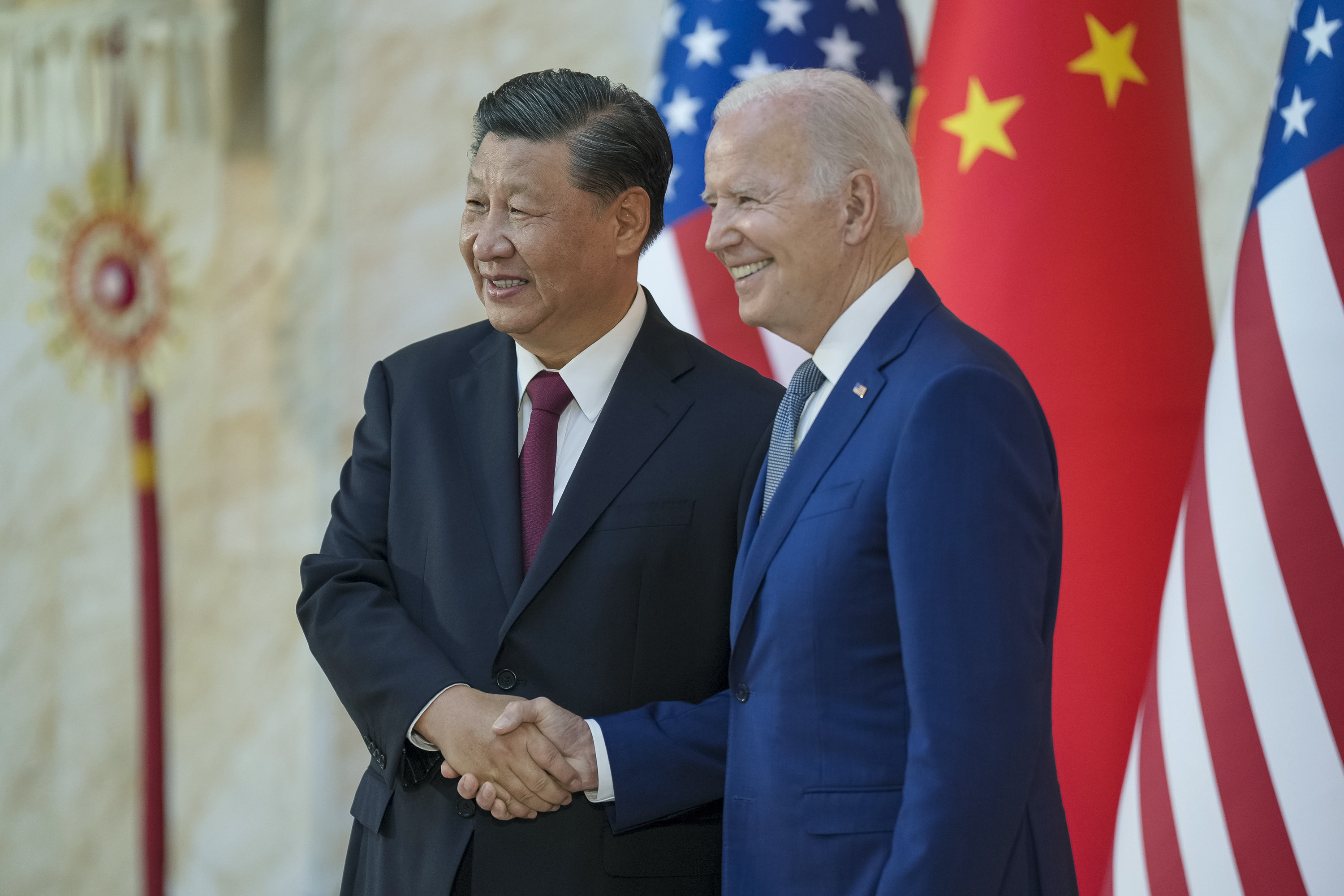
Meeting between US President Joe Biden and CCP General Secretary Xi Jinping in 2022

The legislative bill is aimed at strengthening capabilities in the area of technology, such as quantum computing and AI specifically to face the competitive threat from China perceived as urgent. Senator Chuck Schumer, the leader of the Senate majority and one of the sponsors of the industrial policy bill invoked the threat of authoritarian regimes that want “grab the mantle of global economic leadership and own the innovations”. In 2022, U.S. Innovation and Competition Act was amended and turned into the Chips and Science Act with planned spending of 280 billion US dollars, 53 billion thereof are allocated directly to subsidies for semiconductors manufacturing.

Commentators identified possible positive effects on innovation from the US attempts to compete with China in a perceived rivalry.

Among the main beneficiaries of the US CHIPS Act are the semiconductor producers Intel, TSMC and Micron Technology.

In November 2024, President of the United States Joe Biden and General Secretary of the Chinese Communist Party Xi Jinping affirmed the need to maintain human control over the use of nuclear weapons as opposed to artificial intelligence.

==== European Chips Act ====
In February 2022, the European Union introduced its own European Chips Act initiative. The background of the initiative would be the objective of European strategic autonomy. The EU's initiative puts forward subsidies of 30 billion euros to encourage manufacturing of semiconductors in the EU. The US company Intel is one beneficiary of the initiative.

The US and European chips acts raise concerns of protectionism and a risk of a subsidies "race to the bottom".

=== New world order ===
Member states of the World Artificial Intelligence Cooperation Organization (WAICO)

The AI Cold War heralds a new world order in geopolitics, according to Hemant Taneja and Fareed Zakaria. This new world order is a departure from the unipolar system dominated by the US. It is characterized by existence of two parallel digital ecosystems, ran by China and the US.

In order to succeed countries that consider themselves as democracies are to align their technological ecosystems to that of the US, in a process labelled re-globalization.

The US leads Pax Silica, whereas China initiated the World Artificial Intelligence Cooperation Organization (WAICO).

== See also ==
- China–United States trade war
- Kondratiev wave
- CHIPS and Science Act
- Global Partnership on Artificial Intelligence
- Partnership on AI
- AI nationalism
- AI tiger
