= Arms race =

Competition between two or more parties to have superior armed forces

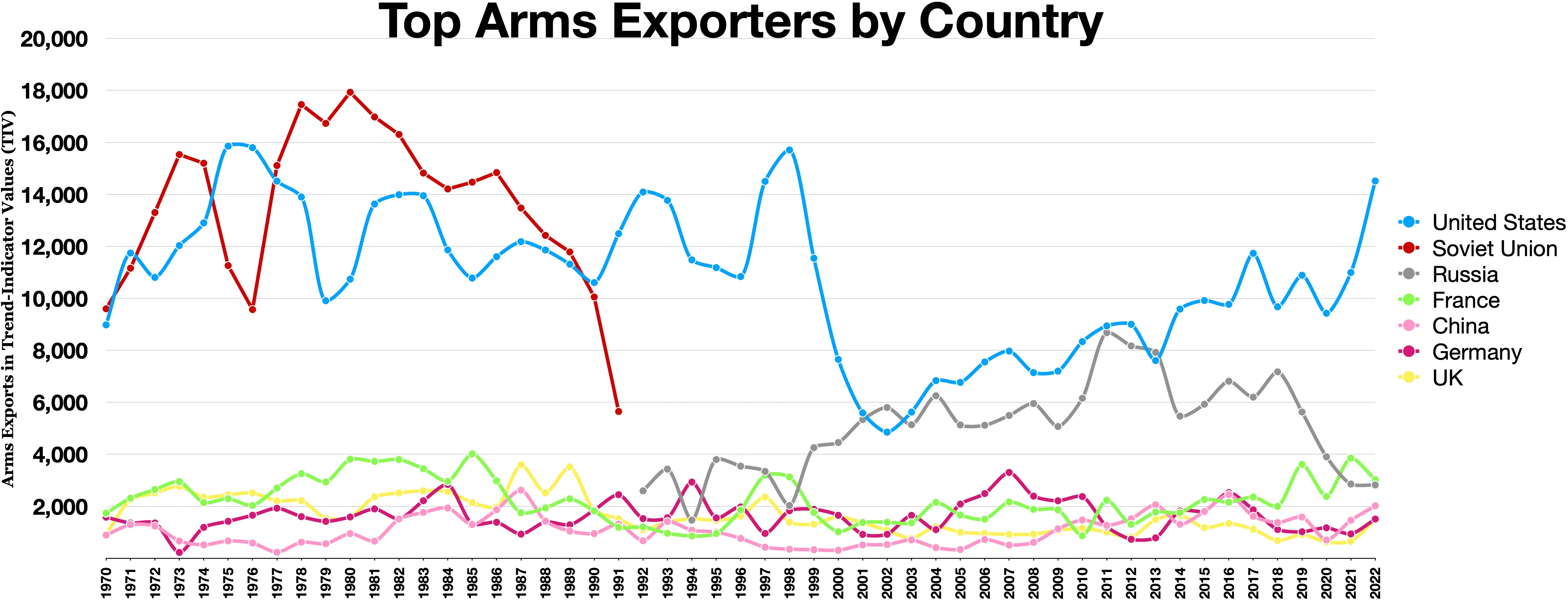
Top arms exporters by country in Trend-Indicator Values (TIV)

An arms race is a competition between two or more states to have superior armed forces, concerning production of weapons, the growth of a military, and the aim of superior military technology. Unlike a sporting race, which constitutes a specific event with winning interpretable as the outcome of a singular project, arms races constitute spiralling systems of on-going and potentially open-ended behavior. Examples include the nuclear arms race.

The existing scholarly literature is divided as to whether arms races correlate with war. International-relations scholars explain arms races in terms of the security dilemma, engineering spiral models, states with revisionist aims, and deterrence models.

== Examples ==
=== Pre–First World War naval arms race ===
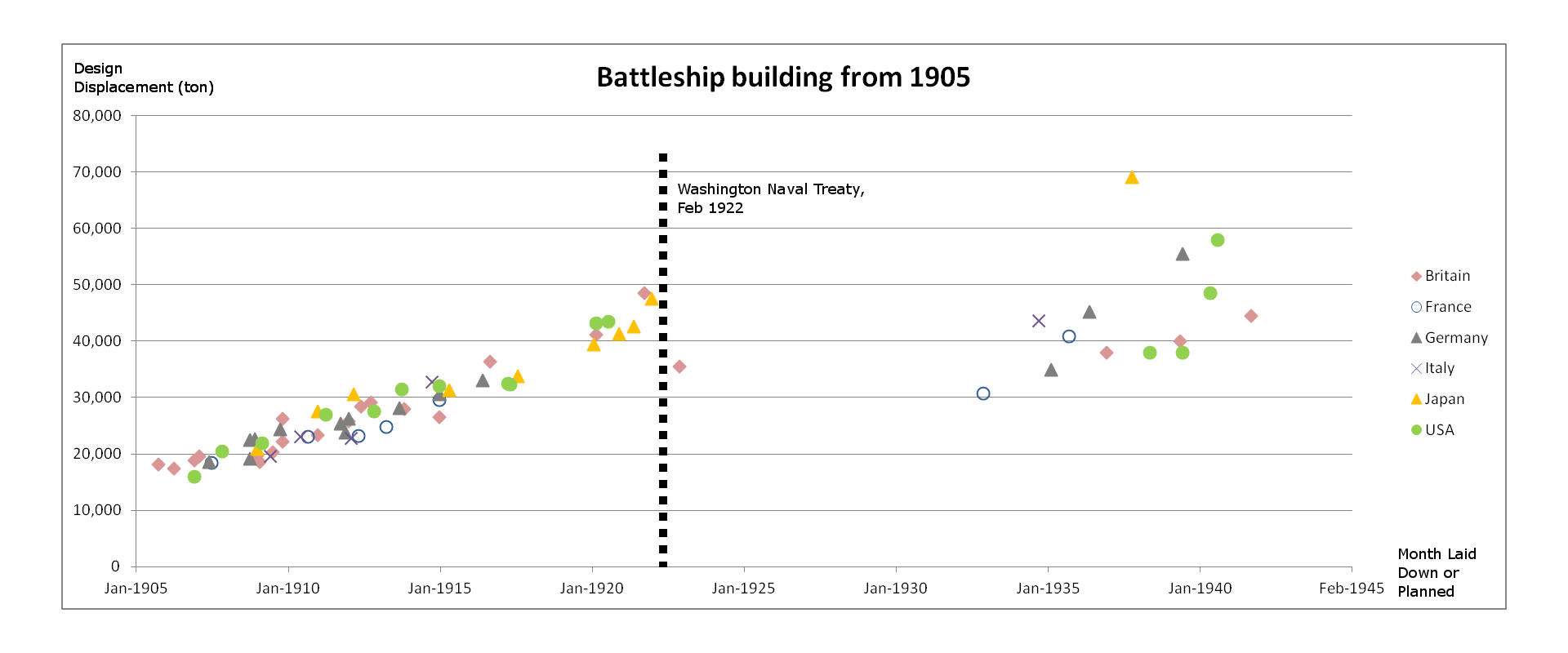
The size and power of battleships grew rapidly before, during, and after World War I: a result of competitive shipbuilding among a number of naval powers, brought to an end by the Washington Naval Treaty

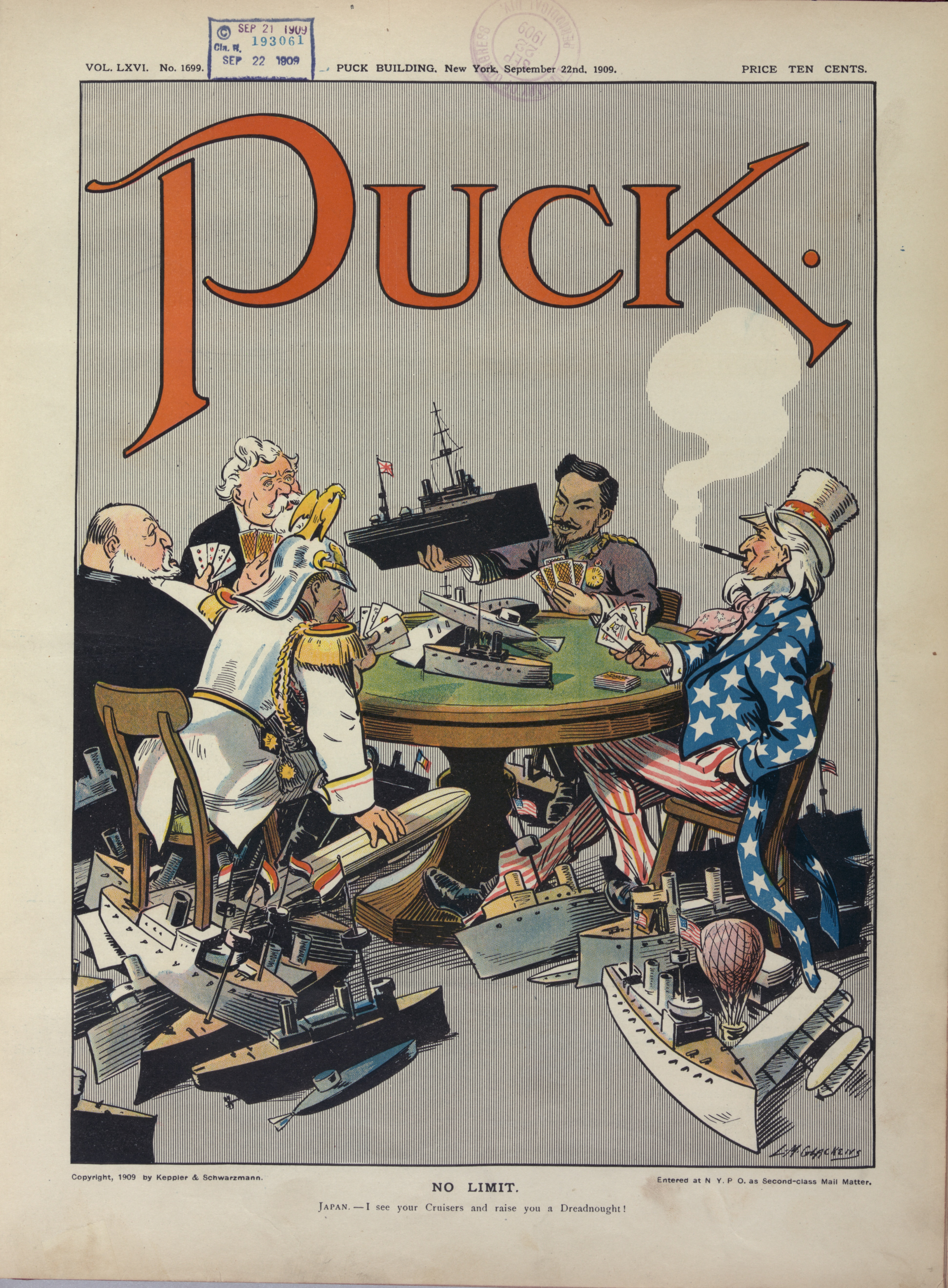
1909 cartoon in Puck shows (clockwise) Japan, US, Germany, Britain, and France engaged in naval race in a "no limit" game.

From 1897 to 1914, a naval arms race between the United Kingdom and Germany took place. British concern about rapid increase in German naval power resulted in a costly building competition of Dreadnought-class ships. This tense arms race lasted until 1914, the outbreak of the First World War. After the war, a new arms race developed among the victorious Allies, which was temporarily ended by the Washington Naval Treaty.

In addition to the British and Germans, contemporaneous but smaller naval arms races also broke out between Russia and the Ottoman Empire; the Ottomans and Greece; France and Italy; the United States and Japan in the 1930s; and Brazil, Argentina, and Chile.

=== Nuclear arms race ===
United States and Soviet Union/Russia nuclear weapon stockpiles

This contest of the advancement of offensive nuclear capabilities occurred during the Cold War, an intense period between the Soviet Union and the United States and some other countries. This was one of the main causes that began the Cold War, and perceived advantages of the adversary by both sides (such as the missile gap and bomber gap) led to large spending on armaments and the stockpiling of vast nuclear arsenals. Proxy wars were fought all over the world (e.g. in the Middle East, Korea, and Vietnam) in which the superpowers' conventional weapons were pitted against each other. After the dissolution of the Soviet Union and the end of the Cold War, tensions decreased and the nuclear arsenal of both countries were reduced.

Charles Glaser argues that numerous cases of arms races were suboptimal, as they entailed a waste of resources, damaged political relations, increased the probability of war, and hindered states in accomplishing their goals. However, arms races can be optimal for security-seeking states in situations when the offense-defense balance favors offense, when a declining state faces a rising adversary, and when advances in technology make existing weapons obsolete for the power that had an advantage in the existing weaponry.

=== Artificial intelligence arms race ===
A military artificial intelligence arms race is an arms race between two or more states to develop and deploy lethal autonomous weapons systems (LAWS). Since the mid-2010s, many analysts have noted the emergence of such an arms race between global superpowers for better military AI, driven by increasing geopolitical and military tensions. An AI arms race is sometimes placed in the context of an AI Cold War between the US and China.

== Other uses ==
An evolutionary arms race is a system where two populations are evolving in order to continuously one-up members of the other population. This concept is related to the Red Queen's Hypothesis, where two opposing organisms evolve in parallel to overcome each other but both fail to progress relative to the other.

In technology, there are close analogues to the arms races between parasites and hosts, such as the arms race between writers of computer viruses and antivirus software, or spammers against Internet service providers and E-mail software writers.

More generically, the term is used to describe any competition where there is no absolute goal, only the relative goal of staying ahead of the other competitors in rank or knowledge. An arms race may also imply futility as the competitors spend a great deal of time and money, yet with neither side gaining an advantage over the other.

== See also ==
- Nuclear arms race
- Arms control
- Arms industry
- Cyber arms race
- Driver safety arms race
- AI arms race
- Lewis Fry Richardson for his mathematical analysis of war
- Second Cold War
- Military–industrial complex
- Missile gap
- One-upmanship
- Revolution in military affairs
- Security dilemma
- Space race
- Weaponization of artificial intelligence
- Saint Petersburg Declaration of 1868
