= List of Belt and Road Initiative member states =

Countries participating in China's Belt and Road Initiative

Countries in the Belt and Road Initiative are in dark green, countries that have officially withdrawn are in light green, and countries that have de facto withdrawn but still have active MoUs or other agreements are in yellow.

This is a list of countries that have signed a memorandum of understanding (MoU) with China to participate in the Belt and Road Initiative (BRI), including countries that have since withdrawn.

Countries join the BRI by signing an MoU with China regarding their participation in it. The government of China maintains a list of all involved countries on its Belt and Road Portal, and the state media outlet Xinhua News Agency issues a press release whenever a BRI-related MoU is signed with a new country. As of May 2025, according to observers at Fudan University's Green Finance & Development Center, between 146 and 150 states were members of the BRI.

== Current and previous members ==
Countries; Signature, Date of Exit, and Status; & Income Level and Region
Country	Date of Signature (Note: Countries join China's Belt and Road Initiative by signing the Memorandum of Understanding.)	Date of Exit	Member Status	Income Level (Note: According to World Bank classifications.)	Region
Afghanistan	1 May 2023	—	Signatory	Low income	South Asia
Albania	1 May 2017	—	Signatory	Upper middle income	Europe & Central Asia
Algeria	10 July 2018	—	Signatory	Upper middle income	Middle East & North Africa
Angola	1 September 2018	—	Signatory	Lower middle income	Sub-Saharan Africa
Antigua and Barbuda	1 June 2018	—	Signatory	High income	Latin America & Caribbean
Argentina	6 February 2022	—	Signatory	High income	Latin America & Caribbean
Armenia	1 December 2015	—	Signatory	Upper middle income	Europe & Central Asia
Austria	—	—	Unclear	High income	Europe & Central Asia
Azerbaijan	1 December 2015	—	Signatory	Upper middle income	Europe & Central Asia
Bahrain	1 July 2018	—	Signatory	High income	Middle East & North Africa
Bangladesh	1 March 2019	—	Signatory	Lower middle income	South Asia
Barbados	1 February 2019	—	Signatory	High income	Latin America & Caribbean
Belarus	1 December 2013	—	Signatory	Upper middle income	Europe & Central Asia
Benin	1 September 2018	—	Signatory	Low income	Sub-Saharan Africa
Bolivia	1 June 2018	—	Signatory	Lower middle income	Latin America & Caribbean
Bosnia and Herzegovina	1 May 2017	—	Signatory	Upper middle income	Europe & Central Asia
Botswana	7 January 2021	—	Signatory	Upper middle income	Sub-Saharan Africa
Brunei	1 November 2018	—	Signatory	High income	East Asia & Pacific
Bulgaria	1 November 2015	—	Signatory	Upper middle income	Europe & Central Asia
Burundi	1 September 2018	—	Signatory	Low income	Sub-Saharan Africa
Cabo Verde	1 September 2018	—	Signatory	Lower middle income	Sub-Saharan Africa
Cambodia	1 December 2013	—	Signatory	Lower middle income	East Asia & Pacific
Cameroon	1 August 2015	—	Signatory	Lower middle income	Sub-Saharan Africa
Central African Republic	1 November 2021	—	Signatory	Low income	Sub-Saharan Africa
Chad	1 September 2018	—	Signatory	Low income	Sub-Saharan Africa
Chile	6 November 2018	—	Signatory	High income	Latin America & Caribbean
China	1 December 2013	—	Signatory	Upper middle income	East Asia & Pacific
Colombia	14 May 2025	—	Signatory	Upper middle income	Latin America & Caribbean
Comoros	1 December 2015	—	Signatory	Low income	Sub-Saharan Africa
Democratic Republic of the Congo	6 January 2021	—	Signatory	Low income	Sub-Saharan Africa
Republic of the Congo	—	—	Unclear	Lower middle income	Sub-Saharan Africa
Cook Islands	1 November 2018	—	Signatory	Upper middle income	East Asia & Pacific
Costa Rica	1 September 2018	—	Signatory	Upper middle income	Latin America & Caribbean
Côte d'Ivoire	23 May 2017	—	Signatory	Lower middle income	Sub-Saharan Africa
Croatia	1 May 2017	—	Signatory	High income	Europe & Central Asia
Cuba	20 June 2019	—	Signatory	Upper middle income	Latin America & Caribbean
Cyprus	1 April 2019	—	Signatory	High income	Europe & Central Asia
Czech Republic	1 November 2015	—	Signatory	High income	Europe & Central Asia
Djibouti	1 September 2018	—	Signatory	Lower middle income	Middle East & North Africa
Dominica	13 July 2018	—	Signatory	Upper middle income	Latin America & Caribbean
Dominican Republic	1 December 2019	—	Signatory	Upper middle income	Latin America & Caribbean
Ecuador	1 December 2018	—	Signatory	Upper middle income	Latin America & Caribbean
Egypt	1 January 2016	—	Signatory	Lower middle income	Middle East & North Africa
El Salvador	1 November 2018	—	Signatory	Lower middle income	Latin America & Caribbean
Equatorial Guinea	1 April 2019	—	Signatory	Upper middle income	Sub-Saharan Africa
Eritrea	25 November 2021	—	Signatory	Low income	Sub-Saharan Africa
Estonia	1 November 2017	11 November 2022 (Note: Estonia left the 17+1 agreement on 11 August 2022 and the BRI Memorandum of Understanding expired on 27 August 2022.)	Exited (de facto from leaving 17+1 and MoU expiration)	High income	Europe & Central Asia
Ethiopia	1 September 2018	—	Signatory	Low income	Sub-Saharan Africa
Fiji	1 November 2018	—	Signatory	Upper middle income	East Asia & Pacific
Gabon	1 September 2018	—	Signatory	Upper middle income	Sub-Saharan Africa
The Gambia	1 September 2018	—	Signatory	Low income	Sub-Saharan Africa
Georgia	1 December 2016	—	Signatory	Lower middle income	Europe & Central Asia
Ghana	1 September 2018	—	Signatory	Lower middle income	Sub-Saharan Africa
Greece	1 August 2018	—	Signatory	High income	Europe & Central Asia
Grenada	1 September 2018	—	Signatory	Upper middle income	Latin America & Caribbean
Guinea	1 September 2018	—	Signatory	Low income	Sub-Saharan Africa
Guinea-Bissau	24 November 2021	—	Signatory	Low income	Sub-Saharan Africa
Guyana	1 July 2018	—	Signatory	Upper middle income	Latin America & Caribbean
Honduras	18 October 2023	—	Signatory	Lower middle income	Latin America & Caribbean
Hungary	1 June 2015	—	Signatory	High income	Europe & Central Asia
Indonesia	1 March 2015	—	Signatory	Upper middle income	East Asia & Pacific
Iran	1 November 2018	—	Signatory	Upper middle income	Middle East & North Africa
Iraq	1 December 2015	—	Signatory	Upper middle income	Middle East & North Africa
Italy	1 March 2019	6 December 2023 (Note: Italy announced its intent not to renew the BRI's Memorandum of Understanding of 6 December 2023. The Memorandum was up for renewal March 2024, therefore formally causing Italy to not longer be signed to the BRI as of 1 April 2024.)	Exited (de facto from MoU expiration)	High income	Europe & Central Asia
Jamaica	1 April 2019	—	Signatory	Upper middle income	Latin America & Caribbean
Jordan	2 December 2023	—	Signatory	Upper middle income	Middle East
Kazakhstan	1 August 2015	—	Signatory	Upper middle income	Europe & Central Asia
Kenya	1 June 2017	—	Signatory	Lower middle income	Sub-Saharan Africa
Kiribati	1 January 2020	—	Signatory	Lower middle income	East Asia & Pacific
Kuwait	1 September 2018	—	Signatory	High income	Middle East
Kyrgyzstan	1 December 2013	—	Signatory	Lower middle income	Europe & Central Asia
Laos	1 September 2018	—	Signatory	Lower middle income	East Asia & Pacific
Latvia	1 November 2016	11 November 2022	Exited (de facto from leaving 17+1 and MoU expiration)	High income	Europe & Central Asia
Lebanon	1 September 2017	—	Signatory	Upper middle income	Middle East & North Africa
Lesotho	1 June 2019	—	Signatory	Lower middle income	Sub-Saharan Africa
Liberia	1 April 2019	—	Signatory	Low income	Sub-Saharan Africa
Libya	1 July 2018	—	Signatory	Upper middle income	Middle East & North Africa
Lithuania	1 November 2017	2 March 2021	Exited (de facto from leaving 17+1 and MoU expiration)	High income	Europe & Central Asia
Luxembourg	1 March 2019	—	Signatory	High income	Europe & Central Asia
Madagascar	1 March 2017	—	Signatory	Low income	Sub-Saharan Africa
Malawi	24 March 2022	—	Signatory	Low income	Sub-Saharan Africa
Malaysia	1 May 2017	—	Signatory	Upper middle income	East Asia & Pacific
Maldives	1 August 2017	—	Signatory	Upper middle income	South Asia
Mali	26 July 2019	—	Signatory	Low income	Sub-Saharan Africa
Malta	1 November 2018	—	Signatory	High income	Middle East & North Africa
Mauritania	1 September 2018	—	Signatory	Lower middle income	Sub-Saharan Africa
Micronesia	1 November 2018	—	Signatory	Lower middle income	East Asia & Pacific
Moldova	1 December 2013	—	Signatory	Lower middle income	Europe & Central Asia
Mongolia	1 December 2013	—	Signatory	Lower middle income	East Asia & Pacific
Montenegro	1 May 2017	—	Signatory	Upper middle income	Europe & Central Asia
Morocco	1 November 2017	—	Signatory	Lower middle income	Middle East & North Africa
Mozambique	1 September 2018	—	Signatory	Low income	Sub-Saharan Africa
Myanmar	1 August 2016	—	Signatory	Lower middle income	East Asia & Pacific
Namibia	1 September 2018	—	Signatory	Upper middle income	Sub-Saharan Africa
Nepal	1 May 2017	—	Signatory	Low income	South Asia
New Zealand	1 March 2017	—	Signatory	High income	East Asia & Pacific
Nicaragua	6 January 2022	—	Signatory	Lower middle income	Latin America & Caribbean
Niger	—	—	Unclear	Low income	Sub-Saharan Africa
Nigeria	1 September 2018	—	Signatory	Lower middle income	Sub-Saharan Africa
Niue	1 July 2018	—	Signatory	Lower middle income	East Asia & Pacific
North Macedonia	1 December 2013	—	Signatory	Upper middle income	Europe & Central Asia
Oman	1 May 2018	—	Signatory	High income	Middle East & North Africa
Pakistan	1 December 2013	—	Signatory	Lower middle income	South Asia
Panama	1 June 2017	3 February 2025	Exited (de facto from Panamanian desire to decrease Panama-China ties and MoU expiration)	High income	Latin America & Caribbean
Papua New Guinea	1 July 2016	—	Signatory	Lower middle income	East Asia & Pacific
Peru	1 May 2019	—	Signatory	Upper middle income	Latin America & Caribbean
Philippines	1 November 2017	2 November 2023	Exited (de facto from rising tensions and MoU expiration)	Lower middle income	East Asia & Pacific
Poland	1 November 2015	—	Signatory	High income	Europe & Central Asia
Portugal	1 December 2018	—	Signatory	High income	Europe & Central Asia
Qatar	1 January 2019	—	Signatory	High income	Middle East & North Africa
Romania	1 June 2015	—	Signatory	Upper middle income	Europe & Central Asia
Russia	—	—	Unclear	High income	Europe & Central Asia
Rwanda	1 July 2018	—	Signatory	Low income	Sub-Saharan Africa
Samoa	1 October 2018	—	Signatory	Upper middle income	East Asia & Pacific
Saudi Arabia	1 August 2018	—	Signatory	High income	Middle East & North Africa
Senegal	1 July 2018	—	Signatory	Low income	Sub-Saharan Africa
Serbia	1 November 2015	—	Signatory	Upper middle income	Europe & Central Asia
Seychelles	1 September 2018	—	Signatory	High income	Sub-Saharan Africa
Sierra Leone	1 August 2018	—	Signatory	Low income	Sub-Saharan Africa
Singapore	1 April 2018	—	Signatory	High income	East Asia & Pacific
Slovakia	1 November 2015	—	Signatory	High income	Europe & Central Asia
Slovenia	1 November 2017	—	Signatory	High income	Europe & Central Asia
Solomon Islands	1 October 2019	—	Signatory	Lower middle income	East Asia & Pacific
Somalia	1 August 2015	—	Signatory	Low income	Sub-Saharan Africa
South Africa	1 December 2015	—	Signatory	Upper middle income	Sub-Saharan Africa
South Sudan	1 September 2018	—	Signatory	Low income	Sub-Saharan Africa
Sri Lanka	1 April 2017	—	Signatory	Lower middle income	South Asia
Sudan	1 September 2018	—	Signatory	Lower middle income	Sub-Saharan Africa
Suriname	1 July 2018	—	Signatory	Upper middle income	Latin America & Caribbean
Syria	6 January 2022	—	Signatory	Low income	Middle East & North Africa
Tajikistan	1 October 2018	—	Signatory	Low income	Europe & Central Asia
Tanzania	1 September 2018	—	Signatory	Low income	Sub-Saharan Africa
Thailand	1 December 2014	—	Signatory	Upper middle income	East Asia & Pacific
Timor-Leste	1 April 2017	—	Signatory	Lower middle income	East Asia & Pacific
Togo	1 September 2018	—	Signatory	Low income	Sub-Saharan Africa
Tonga	1 March 2018	—	Signatory	Upper middle income	East Asia & Pacific
Trinidad and Tobago	1 May 2018	—	Signatory	High income	Latin America & Caribbean
Tunisia	1 July 2018	—	Signatory	Lower middle income	Middle East & North Africa
Turkey	1 November 2015	—	Signatory	Upper middle income	Europe & Central Asia
Turkmenistan	1 June 2017	—	Signatory	Upper middle income	Europe & Central Asia
Uganda	1 September 2018	—	Signatory	Low income	Sub-Saharan Africa
Ukraine	1 December 2017	—	Signatory	Lower middle income	Europe & Central Asia
United Arab Emirates	1 July 2018	—	Signatory	High income	Middle East & North Africa
Uruguay	1 February 2018	—	Signatory	High income	Latin America & Caribbean
Uzbekistan	1 June 2015	—	Signatory	Lower middle income	Europe & Central Asia
Vanuatu	1 November 2018	—	Signatory	Lower middle income	East Asia & Pacific
Venezuela	1 September 2018	—	Signatory	Upper middle income	Latin America & Caribbean
Vietnam	1 November 2017	—	Signatory	Lower middle income	East Asia & Pacific
Yemen	1 November 2017	—	Signatory	Low income	Middle East & North Africa
Zambia	1 September 2018	—	Signatory	Lower middle income	Sub-Saharan Africa
Zimbabwe	1 September 2018	—	Signatory	Low income	Sub-Saharan Africa
