= World Artificial Intelligence Cooperation Organization =

China-led international artificial intelligence organization

World Artificial Intelligence Cooperation Organization 世界人工智能合作组织
- Member states of WAICO Observers
- Headquarters: Shanghai, China
- Type: Intergovernmental organization
- Membership: 37 member states

Leaders
  - Governing body: Council of Member States
  - Executive body: Secretariat

Establishment
  - WAICO Agreement signing: July 16, 2026; 3 months ago

The World Artificial Intelligence Cooperation Organization (WAICO) is an international organization focused on artificial intelligence (AI) established in July 2026. Proposed by China prior to its 2026 World Artificial Intelligence Conference, it is headquartered in Shanghai and oriented toward the Global South.

The organization is viewed by analysts as a rival to the US-led Pax Silica initiative, aiming to counterbalance Western influence across global supply chains for rare-earth elements, semiconductors, and AI governance.

== History ==
The World Artificial Intelligence Cooperation Organization was first proposed by Chinese Premier Li Qiang in July 2025. CCP General Secretary Xi Jinping reiterated the proposal at the 32nd meeting of the Asia-Pacific Economic Cooperation in October 2025.

On 16 July 2026, 29 countries signed the agreement on the creation of the WAICO on the eve of the annual World Artificial Intelligence Conference in Shanghai. United Nations Secretary-General António Guterres attended the signing ceremony as an invited guest. Chinese Foreign Minister Wang Yi signed the agreement alongside senior representatives from founding members, including Kazakh Deputy Prime Minister Jaslan Mädiev, Pakistani Foreign Minister Ishaq Dar, Russian official Maxim Oreshkin, and Indonesian Coordinating Minister Airlangga Hartarto. The establishment of WAICO was widely seen as Beijing's strategic response to the US-led Pax Silica framework.

The agreement establishes WAICO as a China-led intergovernmental organization, designed to be open to all sovereign states while primarily focusing on digital development in the Global South. China's positioning within the organization heavily emphasizes the adoption of open-source artificial intelligence. This focus coincided with increasing international adoption of Chinese open-weight models, such as those from DeepSeek, Kimi, and Z.ai, which grew to account for around 40% of token usage among surveyed US firms by mid-2026.

Following the initial ceremony, several additional states acceded to the agreement in late July 2026, including Iran, whose ambassador Abdolreza Rahmani Fazli signed the charter following bilateral meetings with Deputy Foreign Minister Liu Bin.

== Membership ==
Twenty-nine countries signed the founding agreement on 16 July 2026 in Shanghai, followed by eight additional signatories later that month, bringing the total membership to 37 countries.

=== Founding member states ===
The 29 countries that signed the founding agreement on 16 July 2026:

- Algeria
- Belarus
- Brazil
- Cambodia
- Cameroon
- China
- Republic of the Congo
- Cuba
- Ethiopia
- Indonesia
- Kazakhstan (also member of Pax Silica)
- Kenya
- Kyrgyzstan
- Laos
- Lesotho
- Malaysia
- Mozambique
- Myanmar
- Nicaragua
- Oman
- Pakistan
- Russia
- Senegal
- Serbia
- South Africa
- Tajikistan
- Uzbekistan
- Venezuela
- Zambia

=== Later signatory members ===
30 July 2026:

- Dominica

31 July 2026:

- Brunei
- Georgia
- Iran
- Sudan
- Tanzania
- Togo
- Vietnam

=== Observer states ===
- Bangladesh – Joined as an observer state on 1 August 2026

=== Invitees ===
- Singapore (also member of Pax Silica)

== Structure ==
As specified by the founding treaty, WAICO consists of a council and a secretariat. The council consists of all member states and serves as the highest decision-making authority, responsible for admitting new members and observers, appointing the secretary-general and deputy secretaries-general, and establishing subsidiary bodies or working groups.

The secretariat is headed by one secretary-general and two deputy secretaries-general, each serving three-year terms.

== Reactions ==
Arindrajit Basu, writing for the Carnegie Endowment for International Peace, suggested that the Chinese government might intend to use WAICO to expand its network of bilateral AI cooperation centers and shape multilateral AI policy discussions at the United Nations.

Science policy analyst Elizabeth Gibney, writing in Nature in 2025, speculated that WAICO would likely not govern the international AI industry in an enforceable manner, but rather focus on technical cooperation and capacity-building.

Indonesian digital and telecommunications analyst Heru Sutadi highlighted that the global AI ecosystem remains heavily concentrated in hardware, compute capacity, and foundational models dominated by a handful of Western tech firms. In an interview with Majalah ICT, he warned that this risks creating a severe "AI divide", and commented:

"WAICO must be more than just an international organization discussing AI developments. It must be a platform that champions the interests of the Global South so that it is not left further behind in the artificial intelligence revolution. AI must be a technology that empowers all countries, not just strengthens the dominance of a handful of global technology companies."

== See also ==
- Artificial Intelligence Cold War
- Artificial intelligence arms race
- Global Partnership on Artificial Intelligence
- Pax Silica
- Second Cold War
