= Silicon shield =

Aspect of the politics of Taiwan

Silicon shield is the principle in geopolitical relations regarding Chinese unification that the semiconductor industry in Taiwan is important enough to global economic prosperity that it would deter an attempt by China to seize Taiwan by force, and if not would induce foreign powers, particularly the United States, to defend Taiwan in order to preserve the stability of the semiconductor supply chain.

== Background ==
Taiwan's semiconductor industry accelerated in the 1990s, with the foundry model, when manufacturer TSMC began manufacturing chips to American designs. By the end of the decade, the industry was sufficiently matured that the term "silicon shield" had been used in commentary in the context of economic risks of a Chinese invasion. TSMC's manufacturing and design capabilities continued to advance, and by the 2020s its facilities in Taiwan manufactured the most advanced chips in production. As a whole, Taiwanese manufacturers accounted for about 60% of all semiconductors manufactured globally in the early 2020s, by multiple estimates, and TSMC produced over 90% of the most advanced generation of chips.

== Principle ==
According to the New York Times, "Taiwan has relied on its dominance of the microchip industry for its defense," and that "because its semiconductor industry is so important to Chinese manufacturing and the United States consumer economy, actions that threaten its foundries would be too risky." The logic behind the principle relies on the collective dependence of the global economy on the chips manufactured in Taiwan, particularly China and the United States, the other two primary players in a potential Taiwanese armed conflict. While American industry accounting for only 12% of global chip production in 2021, American companies remained prominent in development while outsourcing the production, and Taiwanese companies accounted for about 65% of this contract manufacturing in the early 2020s. In parallel, Chinese development of domestic semiconductor technology lagged, forcing its manufacturers of computer hardware to import the required chips, including over $100 billion worth of Taiwanese chips in 2021. The collective dependence by all parties is deep enough that a United States government analysis found a potential Taiwanese conflict in the form of a blockade by China would cost the global economy as much as $2.5 trillion, while a report from Bloomberg projected a cost of $5 trillion.

The potential effects of a conflict are presumed to support a continuation of Taiwan's independently governed status quo by incentivizing restraint by China, as a result of its dependence on steady supplies of chips from Taiwan, and the interest of foreign powers in intervening to prevent a disruption to their imports. As a result, Taiwan's government has referenced the value of its semiconductor industry in protecting its sovereignty; President Tsai Ing-wen referred to the industry as supporting national security, and her government considered it to be a "divine mountain that guards the nation" while her successor Lai Ching-te suggested that other global powers had an incentive to prevent a conflict.

By the mid-2020s, the shield was seen as being at risk due to the turn of the United States under the administrations of Joe Biden and Donald Trump towards domestic manufacturing and economic protectionism. Under the Biden administration, the US government provided about $50 billion in subsidies via the CHIPS and Science Act for manufacturers including TSMC to build chip production facilities in the country; according to Commerce Secretary Gina Raimondo the administration saw imports from Taiwan as "untenable." The second Trump administration similarly prioritized American manufacturing, leading TSMC to announce further investments, including factories capable of producing its latest generation chips. Additionally, US export controls on technology developed by American companies led to a ban on the sale to China of certain chips for use in artificial intelligence applications, a move seen as providing further incentive for China to invest in its domestic chip industry. Though both administrations used policy measures to lessen US dependence on imports from Taiwan, President Biden indicated willingness to use military force in defense of Taiwan, while President Trump returned to the more typical American stance of strategic ambiguity.

== Reception ==
In 2022 Matthew Pottinger challenged the existence of a Silicon Shield arguing that China does not behave in ways which appear rational to audiences in democratic countries.

== See also ==
- Geostrategy in Taiwan
- Semiconductor industry in Taiwan
- TSMC Arizona
- Pax Silica
