= Minerals Security Partnership =

Transnational association

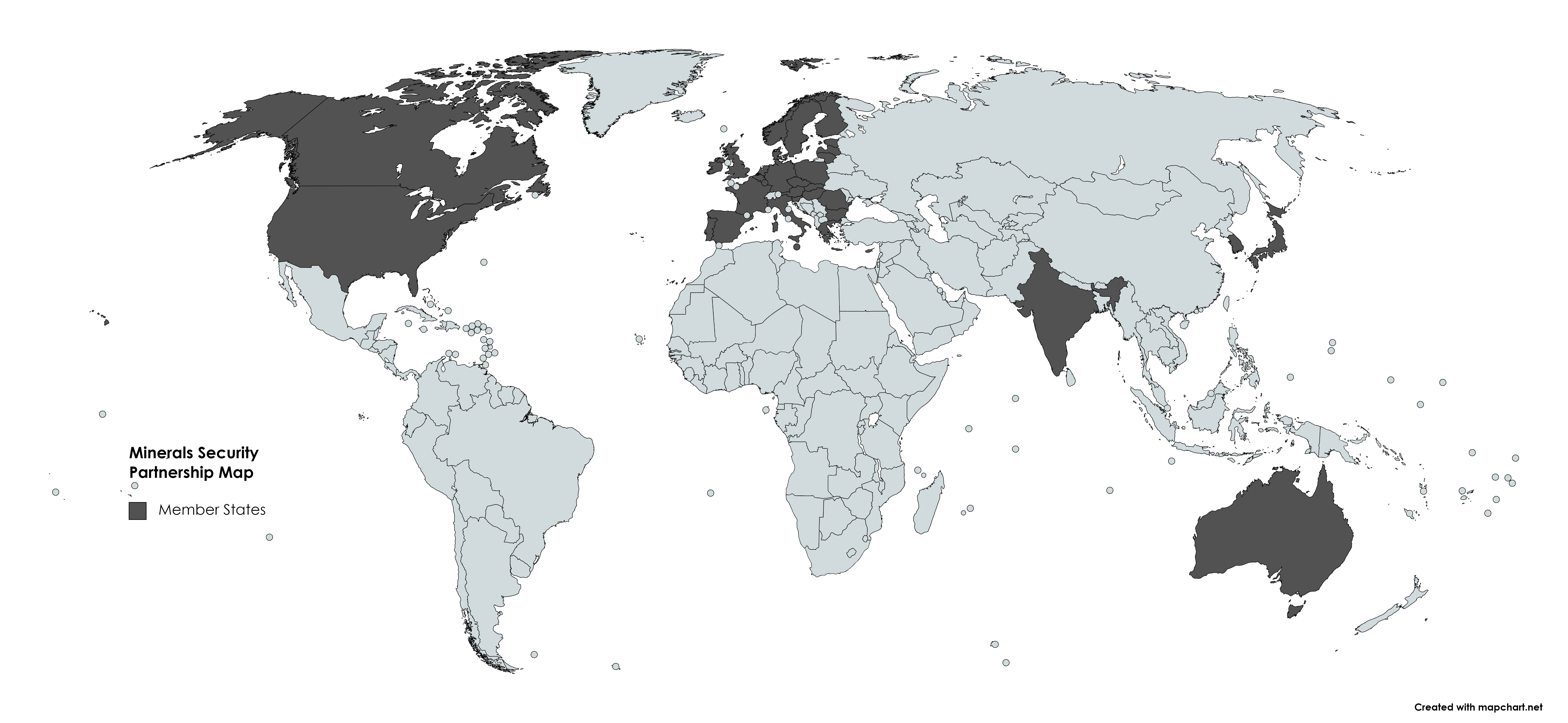
Minerals Security Partnership Map

The Minerals Security Partnership (MSP) was a transnational association whose members sought to secure a stable supply of raw materials for their economies. The MSP was composed of 14 countries and the EU: Australia, Canada, Estonia, Finland, France, Germany, India, Italy, Japan, Norway, South Korea, Sweden, the United Kingdom, the United States, and the European Union. Members professed a commitment to high Environmental, social, and corporate governance (ESG) standards. In 2026, the MSP was succeeded by the Forum on Resource Geostrategic Engagement (FORGE).

== History ==
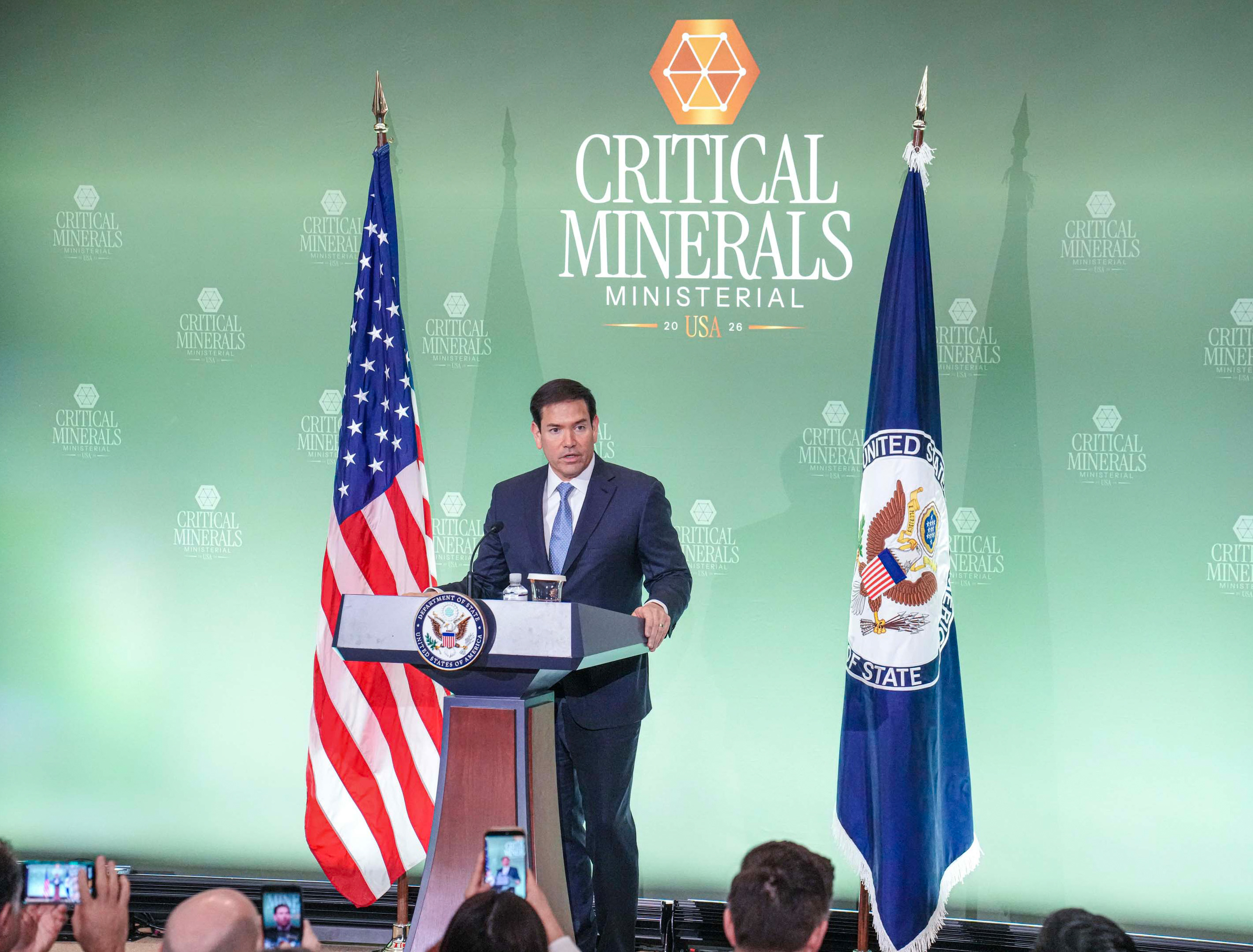
United States Secretary of State Marco Rubio at the "2026 Critical Minerals Ministerial".

According to the inaugural announcement made at the Prospectors and Developers Association of Canada convention in June 2022, the goal of the MSP "is to ensure that critical minerals are produced, processed, and recycled in a manner that supports the ability of countries to realize the full economic development benefit of their geological endowments."

India was inducted into the MSP in June 2023. Estonia joined the MSP in early March 2024.

On 4 February, during the "2026 Critical Minerals Ministerial", United States Secretary of State Marco Rubio announced the creation of the Forum on Resource Geostrategic Engagement (FORGE) as the successor to the Minerals Security Partnership (MSP). Building on the MSP, FORGE partners will collaborate at the policy and project levels to advance initiatives that strengthen diversified, resilient, and secure critical minerals supply chains.

== Activities ==
The governments of Angola, Botswana, the Democratic Republic of Congo, South Africa, Tanzania, Uganda and Zambia met with the MSP members at Investing in African Mining Indaba on 7 February 2023.

== Reactions ==
The head of the Alaska Miners Association on 1 November 2022 said that "I worry that the MSP will prompt decision makers within the federal administration to prioritize mining in other countries in an attempt to walk a line between getting the minerals we must have but not developing ones in America under the name of conservation."

== See also ==
- Pax Silica
- San Francisco Declaration on the Secure Foundations of Enduring Prosperity
