= Cooperation between China and Central and Eastern European Countries =

Initiative by the Chinese Ministry of Foreign Affairs

Cooperation between China and Central and Eastern European Countries 中国－中东欧国家合作
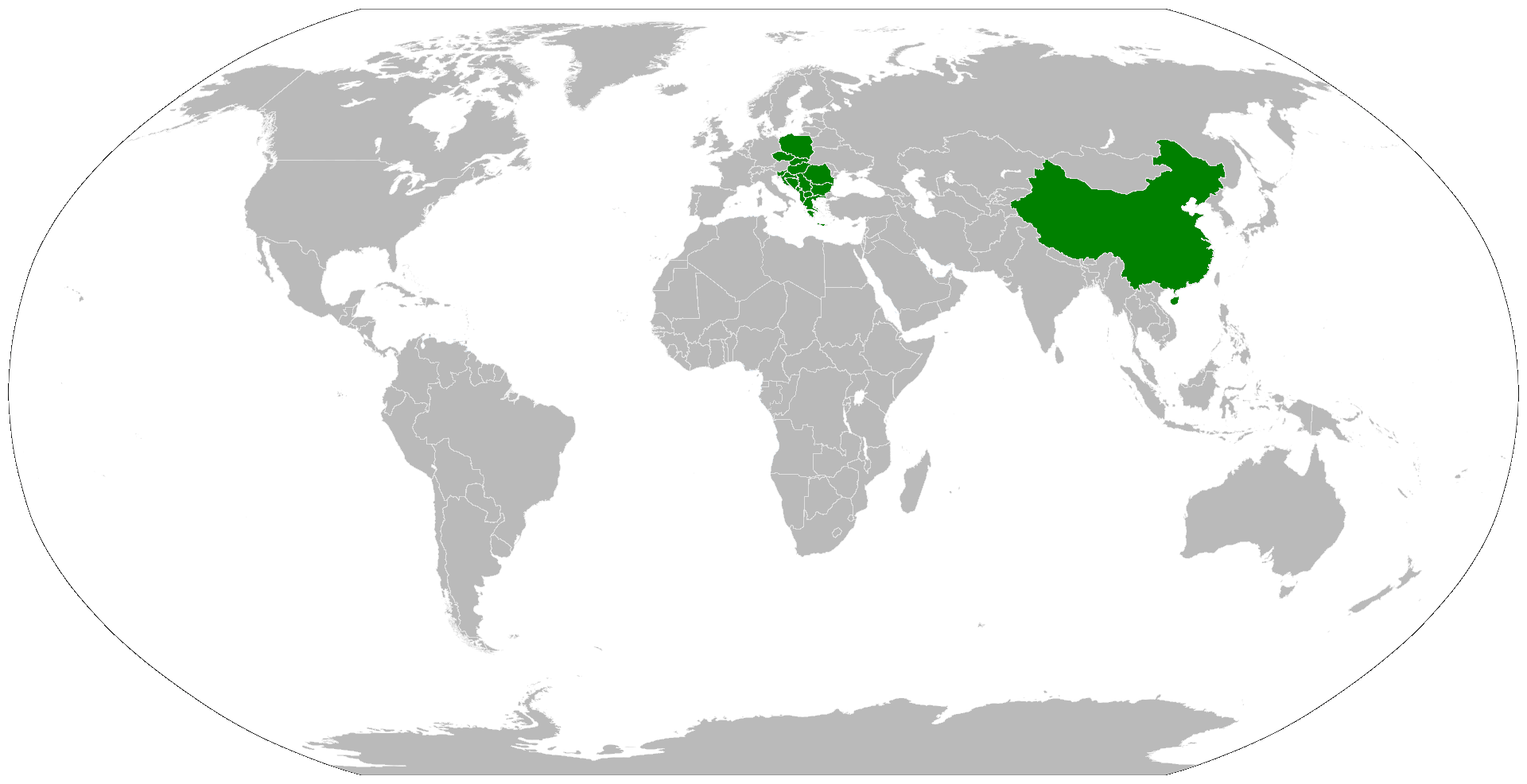
- Abbreviation: 14+1 →17+1 →16+1 →14+1
- Formation: 26 April 2012
- Purpose: Regional Cooperation
- Headquarters: Beijing, PRC (Secretariat/秘书馆)
- Members: China 14 CEE Members: Albania; Bosnia and Herzegovina; Bulgaria; Croatia; Czech Republic; Greece; Hungary; Montenegro; North Macedonia; Poland; Romania; Serbia; Slovakia; Slovenia; 6 Observers: Austria; Belarus; Switzerland; Georgia; European Union; European Bank for Reconstruction and Development; 3 Former Members: Estonia; Lithuania; Latvia
- Secretary (秘书长): (China) Deng Li
- Website: china-ceec

Cooperation between China and Central and Eastern European Countries (China-CEE, China-CEEC, also 14+1; formerly 17+1 from 2019 to 2021 and 16+1 from 2021 to 2022) is an initiative by the Chinese Ministry of Foreign Affairs to promote business and investment relations between China and 14 countries of Central and Eastern Europe (CEE, CEEC): Albania, Bosnia and Herzegovina, Bulgaria, Croatia, the Czech Republic, Greece, Hungary, Montenegro, North Macedonia, Poland, Romania, Serbia, Slovakia, and Slovenia. Prior to their 2022 withdrawal, Estonia, Latvia, and Lithuania were members of the initiative.

== Format ==
The format was founded in 2012 in Budapest to push for cooperation of the "16+1" (the 16 CEE countries and PRC). In 2019 at the Dubrovnik Summit, Greece joined the grouping, while in 2021, Lithuania left it. The 16+1 meet annually; summits were held in Dubrovnik (2019), Sofia (2018), Budapest (2017), Riga (2016), Suzhou (2015), Belgrade (2014), Bucharest (2013), and Warsaw (2012). The China-CEE secretariat is in Beijing, with 16 "national coordinators" in each of the partner CEE countries.

The format's goals are to promote the Chinese Belt and Road Initiative and enhance cooperation in the fields of infrastructure, transportation and logistics, trade, and investment". These goals are supported by "growing ties in the areas of culture, education, and tourism ... cultural exchanges, think tanks, and NGOs."

=== Summit ===
Order	Hosting Country	City	Date	Theme
1	Poland	Warsaw	2012.4.26	
2	Romania	Bucharest	2013.11.26	"Win-Win Cooperation and Common Development"
3	Serbia	Belgrade	2014.12.16	"New Power, New Platform, New Engine"
4	China	Suzhou	2015.11.24	"New Starting Point, New Field, New Vision"
5	Latvia	Riga	2016.11.5	"Interconnection, Innovation, Integration and Mutual Aid"
6	Hungary	Budapest	2017.11.27	"Deepen Economic, Trade and Financial Cooperation and Promote Mutually Beneficial and Win-Win Development"
7	Bulgaria	Sofia	2018.7.7	"Deepening Open and Pragmatic Cooperation to Jointly Promote Shared Prosperity and Development"
8	Croatia	Dubrovnik	2019.4.12	"Building a Bridge of Openness, Innovation and Partnership"
9	China	Video conference	2021.2.9 (postponed due to COVID)	

=== Enlargement ===
==== Greece ====
In the 2019 summit (Dubrovnik), Greece, previously an observer, became a full member of the mechanism.

=== Withdrawals ===
==== Lithuania ====
In March 2021, the Lithuanian National Radio and Television (LRT) reported that in February, the Lithuanian parliament agreed to leave what was previously China's 17+1 format. Foreign minister Gabrielius Landsbergis said the cooperation between Beijing and Lithuania has brought "almost no benefits". At the same time, it was also reported that Lithuania would open a trade representative office in Taiwan, formally known as the Republic of China (ROC), to boost unofficial relations with Taipei.

The incident led to a diplomatic row with China and further trade disputes, including Chinese boycotts of Lithuanian components, dragging the European Union into the dispute. Lithuanian President Gitanas Nausėda stated in January 2022 that it was a mistake in allowing Taiwan to open a representative office under the 'Taiwan' name, and that he was not consulted on the decision. Furthermore, a January 2022 poll commissioned by the Lithuanian Ministry of Foreign Affairs found that a large majority of Lithuanian citizens were critical of the government's policy towards China at the time, leading to opposition figures calling for the repair of bilateral relations. Later on, a poll that was conducted soon after the 2022 Russian invasion of Ukraine showed that 20% of Lithuanian respondents viewed China very negatively and 44% rather negatively.

According to the Centre for European Policy Studies, Lithuania has been noted as a target of Chinese influence activities along with many countries in Europe.

==== Estonia and Latvia ====
On 11 August 2022, Estonia and Latvia stepped out of the format.

=== Inactive members ===
==== Czech Republic ====
In January 2023, Czech presiden Miloš Zeman spoke with General Secretary of the Chinese Communist PartyXi Jinping through a video conference to promote trade and bilateral relations Following the end of Zeman's term in March 2023 however, the foreign ministry of the Czech Republic said it is "not an active member" of the format in the wake of the Russian invasion of Ukraine. The format was publicly panned by the foreign minister of the Czech Republic as lacking substance or a future.

==== Romania ====
Since the government structure changed from left-wing Victor Ponta cabinet to a predominantly right-wing one in 2015, most projects revolving around China-Romania relations were scrapped in favour of strengthening ties with USA.

== Infrastructure, investment, and trade ==
This includes (as of 2017) Serbia's E763 Highway project, the Budapest–Belgrade railway, and the China–Europe Land–Sea Express Route. In Croatia, a Chinese consortium led by China Road and Bridge Corporation (CRBC) was contracted for the first phase of the construction of Pelješac Bridge and its access roads. In Poland, Chinese companies acquired Huta Stalowa Wola's civil engineering machinery division and Poland's PBF bearings.

According to China Customs' statistics, China's trade volume with CEEC totaled $67.98 billion in 2017, a 15.9 percent increase compared to that of 2016. According to the Chinese Ministry of Commerce, in 2016 China-CEE trade increased to $58.7 billion (from $43.9 billion in 2010), while its investment in CEE countries has accumulated to more than $8 billion, covering industries such as machinery, chemical, telecom, and new energy.

== Cultural links ==
All CEEC countries host at least one Confucius Institute, and some (Serbia, Bosnia and Herzegovina, Hungary, and Romania) host multiple of them.

From 2012 to 2017, six new direct flight routes between China and CEEC have been opened, the number of Chinese tourists visiting CEEC increased from 280,000 to 930,000, and the number of exchange students doubled as well. A China-CEEC Coordination Center for Cultural Cooperation was opened in North Macedonia. In China, the China-CEEC training center for young artists and China-CEEC Cultural and Creative Industries Exchanges and Cooperation Center were opened in the southwestern city of Chengdu.

== Reaction ==
Jeremy Garlick, a British associate professor at the Prague University of Economics and Business, examined accusations that China is pursuing an assertive strategy of 'divide and conquer' tactics designed to benefit China at the EU's expense and concluded that this is not proven, but that China's investments demonstrate elements of offensive mercantilism. These include "support for national champions, close coordination between Chinese stakeholders, large credit lines, the acquisition of strategic assets, infrastructure building, the signing of bilateral trade agreements, some efforts to gain access to energy and raw materials, increased exports of Chinese manufactured products and attempts to build political influence via economic means." Others such as the European Commission, European Parliament, and several scholars, dispute the Chinese view that China–EU cooperation is 'win–win' and mutually beneficial for China, the countries involved, and the European Union (EU).

== See also ==
- Belt and Road Initiative
- China–European Union relations
- Northern Future Forum
- Three Seas Initiative

== Publications ==
- Weiqing Song (eds.),China's Relations with Central and Eastern Europe: From "Old Comrades" to New Partners, Routledge, October 2017.
- Anastas Vangeli, Central and Eastern Europe as a New Frontier of China's Multilateral Diplomacy, Guest Editor: Dragan Pavlićević, Global China and Symbolic Power: The Case of 16 + 1 Cooperation, Journal of Contemporary China, 11 April 11, 2018, Global China and Symbolic Power: The Case of 16 + 1 Cooperation
- Anastas Vangeli, China's Engagement with the Sixteen Countries of Central, East and Southeast Europe under the Belt and Road Initiative, 19 September 2017, China's Engagement with the Sixteen Countries of Central, East and Southeast Europe under the Belt and Road Initiative, in: China & World Economy, Volume 25, Issue 5, Special Issue: Eurasian Perspectives on China's Belt and Road Initiative, September–October 2017, pp. 101–124.
- Jean-Paul Larçon (eds.), The New Silk Road: China Meets Europe in the Baltic Sea Region – A Business Perspective, HEC Paris, France, World Scientific, July 2017
- Radu Sava, Romanian rhetoric on China's 16+1. Diffraction of politics and economics in Studia Universitatis Babes-Bolyai 1/2019, pp. 132–155.
- Emilian Kavalski, China's "16+1" Is Dead? Long Live the "17+1.", The Diplomat, March 29, 2019.
- Ivana Karaskova, Engaging China in 17+1: Time for the ACT Strategy, The Diplomat, April 7, 2020.
- Keegan Elmer, Europe's '17+1' countries dissatisfied with China relations, report says, as summit is postponed, South China Morning Post, April 7, 2020.
