= San Francisco Declaration on the Secure Foundations of Enduring Prosperity =

2026 artificial intelligence agreement

San Francisco Declaration
San Francisco Declaration on the Secure Foundations of Enduring Prosperity
- Signed: November 15, 2026
- Location: San Francisco, California
- Parties: Australia; India; Israel; Japan; Qatar; Singapore; South Korea; United Arab Emirates; United Kingdom; United States
- Language: English

The San Francisco Declaration on the Secure Foundations of Enduring Prosperity is an agreement signed on November 15, 2026, by the United States and nine partner nations to safeguard sensitive technologies, critical infrastructure, and supply chains underpinning artificial intelligence. The pact was announced during the Pax Silica Founders Retreat led by U.S. Under Secretary of State for Economic Affairs Jacob Helberg.

The San Francisco Declaration calls for participants to establish working groups on AI policy, adoption, supply chains, security hubs, and resilience, to ultimately reduce reliance on U.S. adversaries for critical minerals, AI models, and semiconductor chips. In a statement from the State Department Spokesperson, the U.S. Department of State said "with the San Francisco Declaration, the coalition cements its shared principles into a working partnership with a common baseline and a path to act on it. No nation can secure the foundations of the SI era alone, and the prosperity SI makes possible will only be as durable as the supply chains and infrastructure beneath it. By agreeing on what must be protected and committing to protect it together, participants are laying the secure foundations on which partner nations can innovate, invest, and grow."

== Signatories ==
- United States of America
- Australia
- India
- Israel
- Japan
- South Korea
- Qatar
- Singapore
- United Arab Emirates
- United Kingdom

Germany, Sweden, the Netherlands, and the European Commission are slated to sign the agreement later in November.

== External link ==
- The San Francisco Declaration on the Secure Foundations of Enduring Prosperity

== See also ==
- Economic security
- Friendshoring
- Minerals Security Partnership
- Pax Silica
