= Second Cold War =

Term referring to heightened tensions in the 21st century

The terms Second Cold War, Cold War II, and New Cold War have been used by scholars and journalists to describe heightened geopolitical tensions in the 21st century post–Cold War era, usually between the United States and NATO on one side and Russia or China (or both) on the other. Some commentators have used the terms as a comparison to the original Cold War, while others have discouraged their use to refer to any ongoing tensions. In the 20th century, the terms were previously referred to one of later phases of the original Cold War. In the early post-Cold War era, the terms were used sparingly and variously for past predictions.

Over the years, the terms have been increasingly used to describe the United States's and NATO's heightened tensions with Russia, which is regarded as the successor state to the Soviet Union, which led the Eastern Bloc during the original Cold War. However, such use to describe the tensions between NATO and Russia or between the US and Russia, especially in relations to the Russo-Ukrainian war, has been criticised. When the terms have been used to describe the US's heightened tensions with China, which has been a communist state since the Chinese Civil War concluded in 1949 with the Communist victory, the context has been often used to criticise foreign policies of the US president Donald Trump. The terms have been sometimes used to describe tensions in multilateral relations, including China–Russia relations, or in the context of international conflicts.

== Usage during original Cold War ==
The phrase "new Cold War" was first used in 1955 by US secretary of state John Foster Dulles, and in a 1956 New York Times article warning of Soviet propaganda promoting the Cold War's resurgence. Other analysts, such as academics Fred Halliday, Alan M. Wald, David S. Painter, and Noam Chomsky, used the interchangeable terms to refer to the 1979–1985 or 1985–1991 phases of the Cold War. Some other analysts used similar terms to refer to the Cold War of the mid-1970s. Columnist William Safire argued in a 1975 New York Times editorial that the Nixon administration's policy of détente with the Soviet Union had failed and that "Cold War II" was then underway. Academic Gordon H. Chang used the term "Cold War II" to refer to the Cold War period after the 1972 meeting in China between US president Richard Nixon and Chinese Communist Party chairman Mao Zedong.

== Past predictions ==
In May 1998, George Kennan described the US Senate vote to expand NATO to include Poland, Hungary, and the Czech Republic as "the beginning of a new cold war", and predicted that "the Russians will gradually react quite adversely and it will affect their policies". In 2001, foreign policy and security experts James M. Lindsay and Ivo Daalder described counterterrorism as the "new Cold War". British journalist Edward Lucas wrote in February 2008 that a new cold war between Russia and the West had already begun.

== Usage in a multilateral context ==
=== Before 2021 ===
The Independent in 2008 described the Russo-Georgian War as "reviv[ing] the spectre of the most tense days of the Cold War" and described it as the beginning of a "new Cold War".

In a 2016 op-ed for The Straits Times, Kor Kian Beng wrote that the phrase "new Cold War" between US-led allies versus Beijing and Moscow did not gain traction in China at first when it first emerged in 2014. He says this changed in 2016 after the United States announced its plan to deploy Terminal High Altitude Area Defense (THAAD) in South Korea against North Korea, but China and Russia found the advanced anti-missile system too close for comfort. The US also supported a tribunal ruling against China in favor of the Philippines in the South China Sea. Afterwards, he wrote, the term "new Cold War" appeared in Chinese media more often.

In a June 2019 interview with a college magazine, University of Southern California (USC) professors Steven Lamy and Robert D. English agreed that talk of a "new Cold War" was intended to distract political publics from bigger issues such as globalisation, global warming, global poverty and increasing inequality. Lamy said there was no new Cold War ("although it serves a purpose for some people to suggest that, especially those who want to increase military budgets") but instead described the heightened global tension as a period of great power rivalry between the US, China and Russia. English said that a new Cold War had already begun, and that China poses a far greater threat to the West than Russia in cyberwarfare but not as much as far-right populism does from within liberal states.

=== 2021–2025 ===
In his September 2021 speech to the United Nations General Assembly, US president Joe Biden said that the US is "not seeking a new Cold War or a world divided into rigid blocs". Biden further said that the US would cooperate "with any nation that steps up and pursues peaceful resolution to shared challenges", despite "intense disagreement in other areas, because we'll all suffer the consequences of our failure".

In May 2022, David Panuelo, President of Micronesia, used the term to state his opposition to a proposed cooperation agreement between China and ten island nations, by claiming it could create a "new 'cold war' between China and the West".

In June 2022, journalist Michael Hirsh used the term "Global Cold War" to refer to tensions between leaders of NATO (North Atlantic Treaty Organization) and China and its ally Russia, both countries striving to challenge the US's role as a superpower. Hirsh further cited growing tensions between the US and China as one of the causes of the newer Cold War alongside NATO's speech about China's "systemic challenges to the rules-based international order and to areas relevant to alliance security". He further cited the Russian invasion of Ukraine in 2022 as one of factors of the newer Cold War's rise.

In July 2022, James Traub used the term while discussing how the ideas of the Non-Aligned Movement, a forum of neutral countries organised during the original Cold War, can be used to understand the reaction of democratic countries in the developing world to current tensions.

In the same month, France, the United States and Russia scheduled high-level, multi-country diplomatic visits in Africa. Reporting on these trips, Associated Press quoted William Gumede of Democracy Works saying "It’s like a new Cold War is playing out in Africa, where the rival sides are trying to gain influence" used the term "new Cold War"; AP commented "some say is the most intense competition for influence [in Africa] since the Cold War".

An editorial by Christian Breuer said "It is conceivable that we see the rebirth of a new era of conflict, the end of the late 20th century unipolar international security architecture under the hegemony of the United States, the end of globalisation and the beginning of a new cold war between the West and the East."

In August 2022, an analysis by journalist Anshel Pfeffer in Haaretz used the term to refer to the US's "open confrontation with Russia and China", concluding that "in the new Cold War, [Israel] cannot allow itself to be neutral". In the same month, Katrina vanden Heuvel cautioned against what she perceived as a "reflexive bipartisan embrace of a new Cold War" against Russia and China among US politicians.

In September 2022, Greek civil engineer and politician Anna Diamantopoulou stated that, despite unity of NATO members, "the West has lost much of its normative power", citing her "meetings with politicians from Africa, Latin America, and the Middle East". She further stated that the West will risk losing "a new cold war" unless it overcomes challenges that would give Russia and China a greater world advantage.

In September 2023, a USC professor Brett L. Carter wrote on his Foreign Affairs piece how the second cold war, exacerbated by China's influence in African affairs, would cause weakened democracy in Africa to recede back to authoritarianism, leading to potential economic hindrance for the continent. As further noted by Carter, while China had been "the Soviet Union's junior partner" to rival the US in the original Cold War, the Soviet Union's successor Russia in the newer cold war has had "more narrow" interests in Africa than China has. Nevertheless, Carter noted how China's and Russia's own domestic situations would hamper Africa's long-term goals. Carter further suggested that the US do more to counter the influences of China and Russia toward Africa.

In the same period, General Secretary of the Workers' Party of Korea Kim Jong Un called for an accelerated increase in the production of domestic nuclear weapons in response to the world entering a "new Cold War" between the United States and a "coalition of nations" including China, Russia, and North Korea.

In December 2023, Gita Gopinath, first deputy managing director of the International Monetary Fund (IMF), warned that the deepening "fragmentation" between the two power blocs—one by the United States and European allies; another by China and Russia—would lead to "cold war two", impacting "gains from open trade" and risking potentially loss of up to US$7 trillion.

In a June 2024 article in The Diplomat, University of Bonn (Germany) professor Maximilian Mayer and Jagiellonian University (Poland) professor Emilian Kavalski opined that the China–Russia relations have been stronger than before and that Xi's China will "fully back Putin's effort to threaten and undermine liberal democratic states", threatening European security and dashing any hopes that the relations between the two countries would become further strained. Mayer and Kavalski criticised Europe for lacking "historical templates" and its "tripartite approach to China—as [its] partner, competitor, and rival" as "woefully outdated because it [the approach] lacks a security angle altogether". Both the professors further advised Europe to address China's strong ties with and strong support for Russia's further aggressive plans toward Europe.

=== 2025–present ===
Further divisions that outlets described as such occurred after the launch of international artificial intelligence and technology initiatives of Pax Silica by US in December 2025, and subsequent WAICO by China seven months later. As of 2026, US-led organisation consist of twenty-four countries—most of them also members of NATO or European Union—while Chinese bloc contains thirty-seven. Kazakhstan is the only country to be a member of both agreements.

In February 2026, before an upcoming US–Brazil meeting, the Brazilian president Luiz Inácio Lula da Silva told a news conference in New Delhi that Brazil wants neither "a new Cold War" nor any country's intervention but rather be "treated equally" like all other countries. He declared this a message to the second administration of Donald Trump, who became the US president again in 2025, succeeding Biden.

== Usage in the context of Russia–United States/NATO tensions ==
Some analysts used the term to describe the worsening relations between Russia on one side and the West or NATO, or more specifically the United States on the other since the 2014 Russian annexation of Crimea and intervention in Eastern Ukraine, which started the Russo-Ukrainian war. Others argue that the term is not appropriate.

=== In relation to the Russo-Ukrainian war (2014–2021) ===
Analysts disagree as to whether a period of global tension analogous to the Cold War is possible in the future, while others, like Carnegie Moscow Center director Dmitri Trenin, used the term to describe the ongoing renewed tensions and hostilities that rose dramatically in 2014 between Russia and the West. Some political analysts argue that Russia's 2014 annexation of Crimea, which started the Russo-Ukrainian war, marked the beginning of a new Cold War between Russia and the West or NATO. By August 2014, both sides had implemented economic, financial, and diplomatic sanctions upon each other: virtually all Western countries, led by the US and European Union, imposed punitive measures on Russia, which introduced retaliatory measures.

In 2014, notable figures such as Mikhail Gorbachev warned, against the backdrop of a confrontation between Russia and the West over the Russo-Ukrainian War, that the world was on the brink of a new cold war, or that it was already occurring. The American political scientist Robert Legvold also believes a new cold war between Russia and the West started in 2014 when Russia annexed Crimea and supported an insurgency in eastern Ukraine. Ian Bremmer, president of the Eurasia Group, argued that the Ukraine conflict did not fit his definition of a cold war.

Stephen F. Cohen, Robert D. Crane, and Alex Vatanka, among others, have all referred to a "US–Russian Cold War". Those opposed to the term argue that while new tensions between Russia and the West over the Ukraine conflict have similarities with those during the Cold War, there are also major differences, and provide Russia with new avenues for exerting influence, such as in Belarus and Central Asia, which have not seen the type of direct military action in which Russia engaged in less cooperative former Soviet states like Ukraine and the Caucasus region.

In June 2014, the Ministry of Defense of North Macedonia published an article asserting that the term "Cold War II" was as a misnomer. In February 2016, at the Munich Security Conference, NATO secretary general Jens Stoltenberg said that NATO and Russia were "not in a cold-war situation but also not in the partnership that we established at the end of the Cold War", while Russian Prime Minister Dmitry Medvedev, speaking of what he called NATO's "unfriendly and opaque" policy on Russia, said "One could go as far as to say that we have slid back to a new Cold War". In October 2016 and March 2017, Stoltenberg said that NATO did not seek "a new Cold War" or "a new arms race" with Russia.

In February 2016, a Higher School of Economics university academic and Harvard University visiting scholar Yuval Weber wrote on E-International Relations that "the world is not entering Cold War II", stating that the current tensions and ideologies of Russia and Western countries are not similar to those of the original Cold War, that conflicts in Europe and the Middle East do not destabilise other areas geographically, and that Russia "is far more integrated with the outside world than the Soviet Union ever was". However, he suggested that Russia and the West were in the midst of a "mini-Cold War".

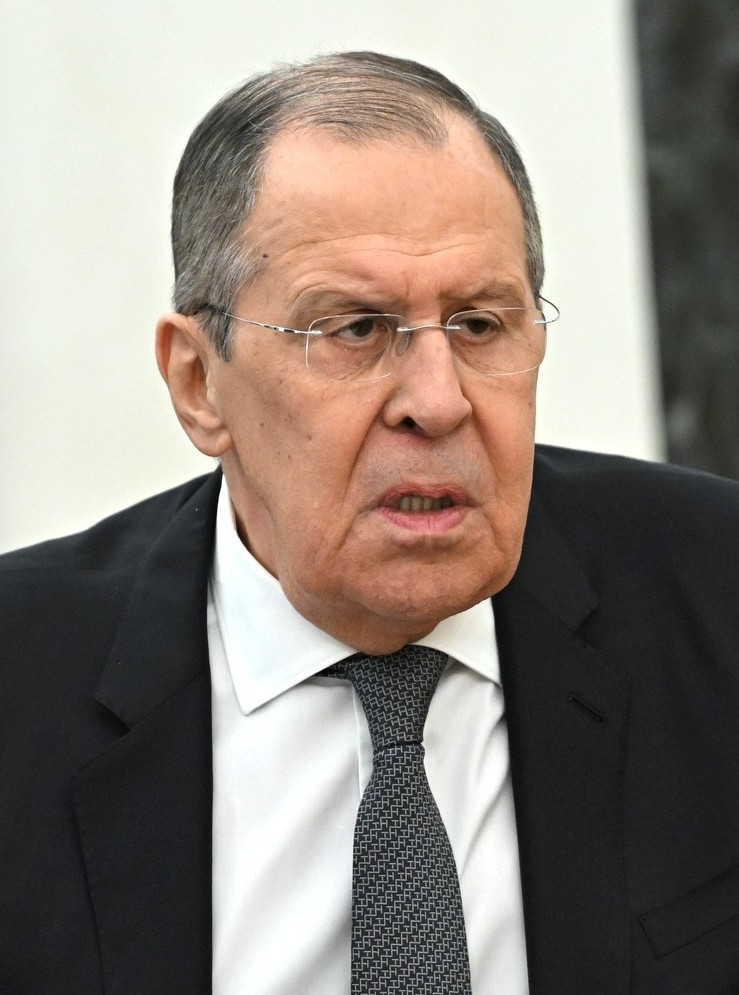
Sergey Lavrov, Russian Foreign Minister since 2004, criticized the term "new cold war".

In September 2016, when asked if he thought the world had entered a new cold war, Russian Foreign Minister, Sergey Lavrov, argued that current tensions were not comparable to the Cold War. He noted the lack of an ideological divide between the United States and Russia, saying that conflicts were no longer ideologically bipolar. In August 2016, Daniel Larison of The American Conservative magazine wrote that tensions between Russia and the United States would not "constitute a 'new Cold War'" especially between democracy and authoritarianism, which Larison found more limited than and not as significant in the 2010s as that of the Soviet-Union era. Andrew Kuchins, an American political scientist and Kremlinologist speaking in December 2016, believed the term was "unsuited to the present conflict" as it may be more dangerous than the Cold War.

In October 2016, John Sawers, a former MI6 chief, said he thought the world was entering an era that was possibly "more dangerous" than the Cold War, as "we do not have that focus on a strategic relationship between Moscow and Washington". Similarly, Igor Zevelev, a fellow at the Wilson Center, said that "it's not a Cold War [but] a much more dangerous and unpredictable situation". CNN opined: "It's not a new Cold War. It's not even a deep chill. It's an outright conflict", due to "competing military operations in Syria, disputes over Eastern European independence and escalating cyber breaches".

In January 2017, former US government adviser Molly K. McKew said that "Putin and his minions have spent the past 15 years ranting about how the West (specifically NATO) wants a new Cold War". She suggested that "fighting a new Cold War would be in America's interest", adding "We won the last Cold War. We will win the next one too". The New Republic editor Jeet Heer criticised McKew's suggestion as "troubling" and for "wildly overstating the extent of Russian ambitions and power". Heer said that unlike the old Cold War, "Current U.S. troubles with Russia aren't the result of ideological differences ... and are intensely localized along Russia's borders, in countries like the Ukraine and Georgia". Jeremy Shapiro, a senior fellow in the Brookings Institution, wrote in his blog post at RealClearPolitics, referring to the US–Russia relations: "A drift into a new Cold War has seemed the inevitable result" of "Russian–Western confrontation" over Eastern European counties such as Ukraine, Moldova and Georgia.

In August 2017, Russian Deputy Foreign Minister Sergei Ryabkov denied claims that the US and Russia were having another cold war, despite ongoing tensions between the two countries over Ukraine and Syria, and newer US sanctions against Russia. The University of East Anglia graduate student Oliver Steward, as well as the Casimir Pulaski Foundation senior fellow Stanisław Koziej, attributed the Russia's Zapad 2017 exercise in Belarus as part of the new Cold War between Russia and the West. In March 2018, Russian president Vladimir Putin told journalist Megyn Kelly in an interview: "My point of view is that the individuals that have said that a new Cold War has started are not analysts. They do propaganda." Michael Kofman, a senior research scientist at the CNA Corporation and a fellow at the Wilson Center's Kennan Institute said that the causes and character of the new conflict between Russia and the West over Ukraine and Georgia are different from the Cold War. He said the Cold War "was a battle for global dominance between two universalist ideologies" while this new conflict for Russia "is about its survival as a power in the international order, and also about holding on to the remnants of the Russian empire". Lyle Goldstein, a research professor at the US Naval War College said that the situations in Georgia and Ukraine "seemed to offer the requisite storyline for new Cold War" between Russia and the West.

Also in March 2018, Harvard University professors Stephen Walt, and then Odd Arne Westad, criticised the application of the term to increasing tensions between Russia and the West as "misleading", "distract[ing]", and too simplistic to describe the more complicated contemporary international politics. In October 2018, Russian military analyst Pavel Felgenhauer told Deutsche Welle that "we have a new Cold War, so the treaties that ended the previous one are irrelevant because they correspond to a totally different world situation", referring to the Intermediate-Range Nuclear Forces (INF) Treaty and others. In February 2019, Sergey Lavrov stated that the withdrawal from the INF Treaty would not lead to "a new Cold War".

The Russian news agency TASS reported the Russian Foreign Minister Sergey Lavrov stating: "I don't think that we should talk about a new Cold War", adding that the US development of low-yield nuclear warheads (the first of which entered production in January 2019) had increased the potential for the use of nuclear weapons. Speaking to the press in Berlin on 8 November 2019, a day before the 30th anniversary of the fall of the Berlin Wall, US secretary of state Mike Pompeo warned of the dangers posed to the West by Russia and China. He said: "Today, Russia – led by a former KGB officer once stationed in Dresden [Vladimir Putin] – invades its neighbours and slays political opponents". Jonathan Marcus of the BBC opined that Pompeo "appeared to be declaring the outbreak of a second [Cold War]".

=== In relation to the Syrian civil war ===
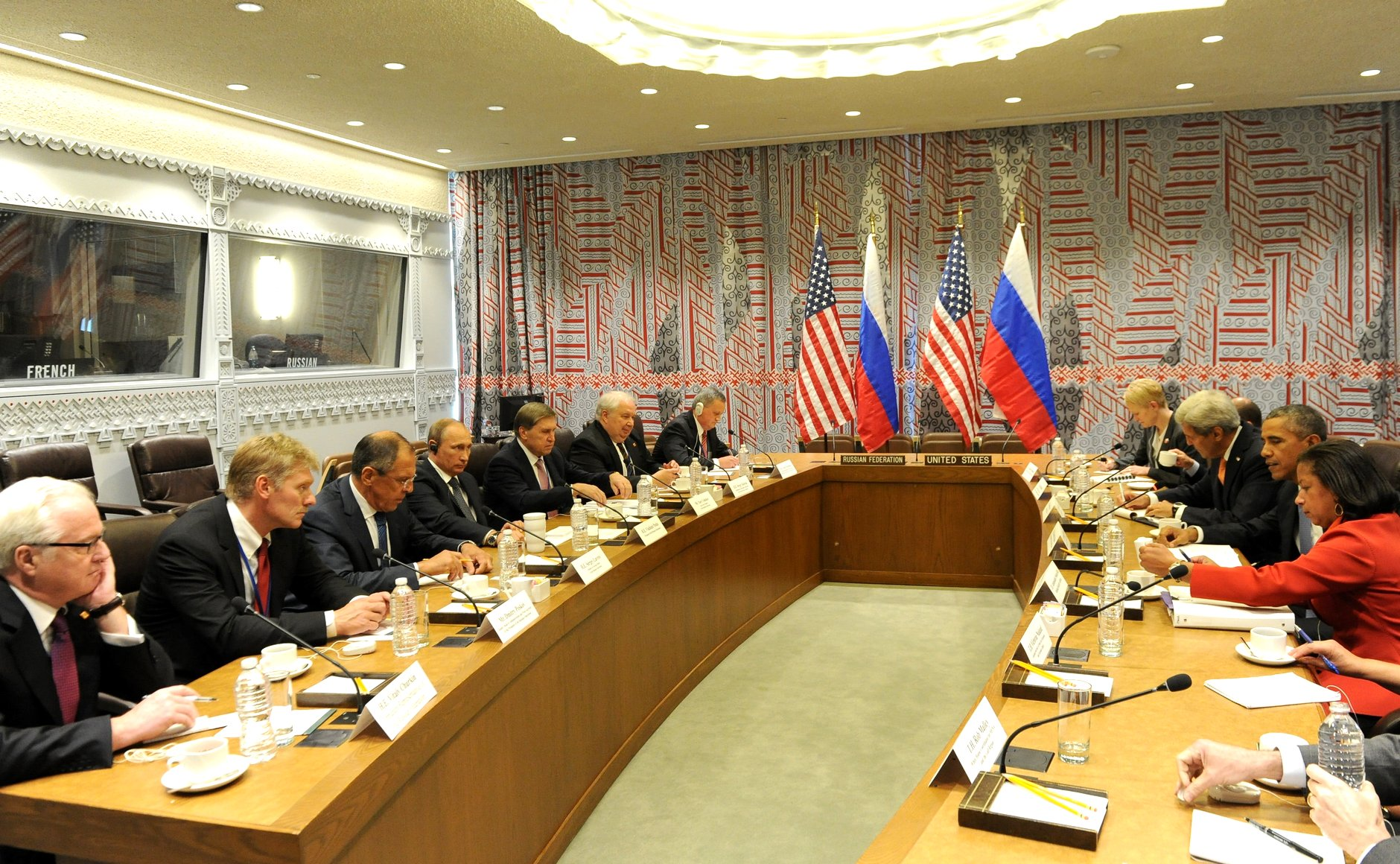
Russian and U.S. representatives meet to discuss the situation in Syria on 29 September 2015

In 2013, Michael Klare compared in RealClearPolitics tensions between Russia and the West to the ongoing proxy conflict between Saudi Arabia and Iran. Oxford Professor Philip N. Howard argued that a new cold war was being fought via the media, information warfare, and cyberwar. Some observers, including Syrian president Bashar al-Assad, judged the Syrian civil war to be a proxy war between Russia and the United States, and even a "proto-world war". In January 2016, senior UK government officials were reported to have registered their growing fears that "a new cold war" was now unfolding in Europe: "It really is a new Cold War out there. Right across the EU we are seeing alarming evidence of Russian efforts to unpick the fabric of European unity on a whole range of vital strategic issues".

In April 2018, relations deteriorated over a potential US-led military strike in Middle East after the Douma chemical attack in Syria, which was attributed to the Syrian Army by rebel forces in Douma, and poisoning of the Skripals in the UK. The secretary-general of the United Nations, António Guterres, told a meeting of the UN Security Council that "the Cold War was back with a vengeance". He suggested the dangers were even greater, as the safeguards that existed to manage such a crisis "no longer seem to be present". Dmitri Trenin supported Guterres' statement, but added that it began in 2014 and had been intensifying since, resulting in US-led strikes on the Syrian government on 13 April 2018. In February 2022, journalist Marwan Bishara held the US and Russia responsible for pursuing "their own narrow interests", including then-US president Trump's recognition of Jerusalem as capital of Israel as well as Putin's Russian invasion of Ukraine, and for "pav[ing] the way for, well, another Cold War".

=== In relation to the Russo-Ukrainian war (since 2022) ===
On 24 February 2022, Russia launched a full-scale invasion of Ukraine, occupying large parts of the country and unilaterally declaring the annexation of southeastern Ukraine in September that year. Soon after, journalist H. D. S. Greenway cited the Russian invasion of Ukraine and 4 February joint statement between Russia and China (under Putin and Xi Jinping) as one of the signs that Cold War II had officially begun. Jaro Bilocerkowycz, Associate Professor of Political Science at the University of Dayton, wrote that the invasion of Ukraine could be the start of a "new Cold War", placing Ukraine "at the center of a geopolitical struggle reminiscent of the Cold War days when Germany and its capital city Berlin were split in two".

In March 2022, Harvard historian Fredrik Logevall asserted that the conflict over Ukraine was "fundamentally different from the Cold War" because it did not have the "massive arms race and a general absence of diplomacy, and a deep ideological schism". Yale historian Arne Westad agreed and said that Putin's statements about Ukraine resembled late 19th- and early 20th-century colonial and imperial ideas, rather than those of the Cold War. In June 2022, journalist Gideon Rachman asserted the Russian invasion of Ukraine as the start of a second Cold War.

In response to US plans to deploy long-range missiles in Germany, including SM-6 and Tomahawk cruise missiles and developmental hypersonic weapons, Putin stated in July 2024 that the situation was reminiscent of the Cold War. Russian and US diplomats said their diplomatic relations were worse than during the 1962 Cuban Missile Crisis. Kremlin spokesperson Dmitry Peskov told a reporter of a Russian state-run television network, "We are taking steady steps towards the Cold War ... All the attributes of the Cold War with the direct confrontation are returning."

Polish retired general and defense analyst Stanisław Koziej wrote in 2024 that "A second cold war against the West is intensifying in Europe. Russia launched it by annexing Crimea in 2014 and following up with a full-scale armed invasion of Ukraine". He said that "this cold war is similar to the first one" but differs in that "it employs a bigger toolbox of activities that are often referred to as 'hybrid' or in the gray zone". Koziej highlighted recent Russian hybrid warfare operations against eastern NATO states, including sabotage, cyberattacks, airspace violations, espionage, weaponized migration, disinformation operations and nuclear blackmail.

Sabine Siebold, Senior European Security correspondent for Reuters, also cited Russian hybrid warfare and NATO troop build-ups as evidence that there was a "new Cold War" between Russia and NATO. She added, "in some ways, it even feels hotter than the Cold War in the 80s. This time we have a war raging on European territory involving Russian forces and Western weapons and many arms control treaties that were in place in the 80s have collapsed in the meantime". In October 2025, Russian Foreign Ministry spokeswoman Maria Zakharova said there was no cold war with NATO because it had already developed into a "firey" conflict, and accused NATO of lying about Russian sabotage to justify vast military spending.

== Usage in the context of China–United States tensions ==
The US senior defense official Jed Babbin, Yale University professor David Gelernter, Firstpost editor R. Jagannathan, Subhash Kapila of the South Asia Analysis Group, and former Australian Prime Minister Kevin Rudd, among other sources, have used the term (occasionally using the term "Pacific Cold War") to refer to tensions between the United States and China, along with Eastern allies North Korea and Russia with Western allies Taiwan, South Korea, Japan, the Philippines and Australia, in the 2000s up until the present day.

=== First Trump presidency (2017–2021) ===
Donald Trump, who was inaugurated as US president in 2017, had repeatedly said during his presidential campaign that he considered China a threat, a stance that heightened speculations of the possibility of a "new cold war with China". Claremont McKenna College professor Minxin Pei said that Trump's election win and "ascent to the presidency" may increase chances of the possibility. In March 2017, a self-declared socialist magazine Monthly Review said, "With the rise of the Trump administration, the new Cold War with Russia has been put on hold", and also said that the Trump administration has planned to shift from Russia to China as its main competitor.

External videos
- "Vice President Mike Pence's Remarks on the Administration's Policy Towards China"

In July 2018, Michael Collins, deputy assistant director of the CIA's East Asia mission center, told the Aspen Security Forum in Colorado that he believed China under General Secretary of the Chinese Communist Party Xi Jinping, while unwilling to go to war, was waging a "quiet kind of cold war" against the United States, seeking to replace the US as the leading global power. He further elaborated: "What they're waging against us is fundamentally a cold war — a cold war not like we saw during [the] Cold War (between the U.S. and the Soviet Union) but a cold war by definition". In October 2018, Hong Kong's Lingnan University professor Zhang Baohui told The New York Times that a speech by United States Vice-president Mike Pence at the Hudson Institute "will look like the declaration of a new Cold War".

In January 2019, Robert D. Kaplan of the Center for a New American Security wrote that "it is nothing less than a new cold war: The constant, interminable Chinese computer hacks of American warships' maintenance records, Pentagon personnel records, and so forth constitute war by other means. This situation will last decades and will only get worse". In February 2019, Joshua Shifrinson, an associate professor from Boston University, said concerns over a new cold war was "overblown", saying US–China relations were different from that of US–Soviet Union relations during the original Cold War, and that ideology would play a less prominent role in their bilateral relationship. In June 2019, academic Stephen Wertheim called President Trump a "xenophobe" and criticised Trump's foreign policy toward China for heightening risks of a new Cold War, which Wertheim wrote "could plunge the United States back into gruesome proxy wars around the world and risk a still deadlier war among the great powers".

In August 2019, Yuan Peng of the China Institute of International Studies said that the 2008 financial crisis "initiated a shift in the global order". Yuan predicted the possibility of the new cold war between both countries and their global power competition turning "from 'superpower vs. major power' to 'No. 1 vs. No. 2'". On the other hand, scholar Zhu Feng said that their "strategic competition" would not lead to the new Cold War. Zhu said that the US–China relations have progressed positively and remained "stable", despite disputes in the South China Sea and Taiwan Strait and US president Trump's aggressive approaches toward China.

In January 2020, columnist and historian Niall Ferguson opined that China is one of the major players of this Cold War, whose powers are "economic rather than military", and that Russia's role is "quite small". Ferguson wrote: "[C]ompared with the 1950s, the roles have been reversed. China is now the giant, Russia the mean little sidekick. China under Xi remains strikingly faithful to the doctrine of Marx and Lenin. Russia under Putin has reverted to Tsarism." Ferguson wrote that this Cold War is different from the original Cold War because the US "is so intertwined with China" at the point where "decoupling" is as others argued "a delusion" and because "America's traditional allies are much less eager to align themselves with Washington and against Beijing". He further wrote that the new Cold War "shifted away from trade to technology" when both the US and China signed their Phase One trade deal.

In a February 2020 interview with The Japan Times, Ferguson suggested that, to "contain China", the US "work intelligently with its Asian and European allies", as the US had done in the original Cold War, rather than on its own and perform something more effective than "tariffs, which are a very blunt instrument". He also said that the US under Trump has been "rather poor" at making foreign relations. On 24 May 2020, Chinese Foreign Minister Wang Yi said that relations with the US were on the "brink of a new Cold War" after it was fueled by tensions over the COVID-19 pandemic. In June 2020, Boston College political scientist Robert S. Ross wrote that the US and China "are destined to compete [but] not destined for violent conflict or a cold war". In July, Ross said that the Trump "administration would like to fully decouple from China. No trade, no cultural exchanges, no political exchanges, no cooperation on anything that resembles common interests."

In August 2020, a La Trobe University professor Nick Bisley wrote that the US–China rivalry "will be no Cold War" but rather will "be more complex, harder to manage, and last much longer". He further wrote that comparing the old Cold War to the ongoing rivalry "is a risky endeavour". In September 2020, the UN secretary-general António Guterres warned that the increasing tensions between the US under Trump and China under Xi were leading to "a Great Fracture" which would become costly to the world. CCP general secretary Xi Jinping replied by saying that "China has no intention to fight either a Cold War or a hot one with any country".

=== Biden presidency (2021–2025) ===
In March 2021, Columbia University professor Thomas J. Christensen wrote that the cold war between the US and China "is unlikely" in comparison to the original Cold War, citing China's prominence in the "global production chain" and absence of the authoritarianism vs. liberal democracy dynamic. Christensen further advised those concerned about the tensions between the two nations to research China's role in the global economy and its "foreign policy toward international conflicts and civil wars" between liberal and authoritarian forces. In September 2021, former Portuguese defence and foreign minister Paulo Portas described the announcement of the AUKUS security pact and the ensuing unprecedented diplomatic crisis between the signatories (Australia, the United Kingdom, and the United States) and France (which has several territories in the Indo-Pacific) as a possible formal starting point of a new Cold War. On 7 November 2021, President Biden's national security adviser Jake Sullivan stated that the US does not pursue system change in China anymore, marking a clear break from the China policy pursued by previous US administrations. Sullivan said that the US is not seeking a new Cold War with China, but is looking for a system of peaceful coexistence.

In November 2021, Hal Brands and Yale professor John Lewis Gaddis wrote in Foreign Affairs that while it was no longer debatable that the United States and China has been entering into their "own new cold war", it was not clear that the world has also been following suit and entering into a new cold war. In a December 2022 editorial published just before being elected US House speaker, Kevin McCarthy wrote that "China and the US are locked in a cold war". The op-ed also announced the creation of the United States House Select Committee on Strategic Competition between the United States and the Chinese Communist Party. In early 2023, Jorge Heine, former Chilean ambassador to China and professor of international relations at Boston University, said the looming new Cold War between the US and China has become apparent to "a growing consensus", and described the new Cold War as "more alike than [it is] different" from the one fought between the US and Soviet Union, and saying the presence of "ideological-military overtones is now widely accepted".

After the 2023 Chinese balloon incident, Evan Osnos wrote for The New Yorker "The blocs in this new cold war are hardening." Shortly after the Russian invasion of Ukraine, Germany had "announced a 'turning point'" in its relationship with Russia. The 2022 Madrid NATO summit hosted leaders from South Korea, Australia, Japan, and New Zealand, who all "voiced unprecedented concern about China's ambitions". The Biden administration strengthened the U.S.'s military ties and activities with Australia, Japan, India, and the Philippines, to "bolster its ability to defend Taiwan".

In the October 2024 article for the TomDispatch blog, a history professor Alfred W. McCoy wrote that, despite rising renewed tensions between China and the US, the Asia-Pacific allies of the US would be likely losers. McCoy warned that, if China's numerous breaches on Taiwan become "a crippling embargo of Taiwan", the US would lose Taiwan, risking a break of "America's island chain in the Pacific littoral, pushing it back to a 'second island chain' in the mid-Pacific", regardless of the US's decisions on Taiwan. He further cited growing anti-American sentiment in the Philippines, the opposition toward AUKUS (trilateral security partnership between Australia, the United Kingdom, and the United States) from certain members of the Labor Party as a threat to Australia's sovereignty, and the Republican Party populism in the US under Trump (or his successor-in-line JD Vance) potentially curtailing the US's ability to maintain its alliance with the Asia-Pacific countries.

In January 2025, almost two weeks before Biden ended his term, Hoover Institution senior fellow Niall Ferguson wrote that the US has had "a second cold war" with China for at least six years and that the war further intensified under the Biden administration. Ferguson drew comparisons between Trump and then-US president Ronald Reagan, like assassination attempts on them, but further suggested that Trump use the Reagan administration's past approach in foreign policy.

=== Second Trump presidency (2025–present) ===
In early February 2025, Michael McFaul, a Stanford University political science professor and former US ambassador to Russia from 2012 to 2014, wrote via The Dispatch that Trump still viewed China as a major rival during his second term. McFaul criticised the second Trump administration for risking its chances to win "Cold War 2.0". He further criticised the administration's foreign policy decisions—for example, calling Canada a potential 51st state candidate, announcing possibility of obtaining Greenland from a NATO ally Denmark by either sale or military force, and attempts to shut down the United States Agency for International Development (USAID)—for giving China and its ally Russia more advantage and risking ties with longtime US allies. McFaul further wrote, "We will not be able to win Cold War 2.0 on our own."

An academic Tim Zajontz in his June 2025 article about Kenya's relations with China and the US noted that the Africa theatre "is not solely reactive to, but co-constitutive of, the Second Cold War". Zajontz further noted how alarming President Trump's second term was to "Kenya's geopolitical vulnerability" and how willing Trump would disengage from "longstanding security cooperation with Kenya" as part of his "disruptive foreign policy arsenal".

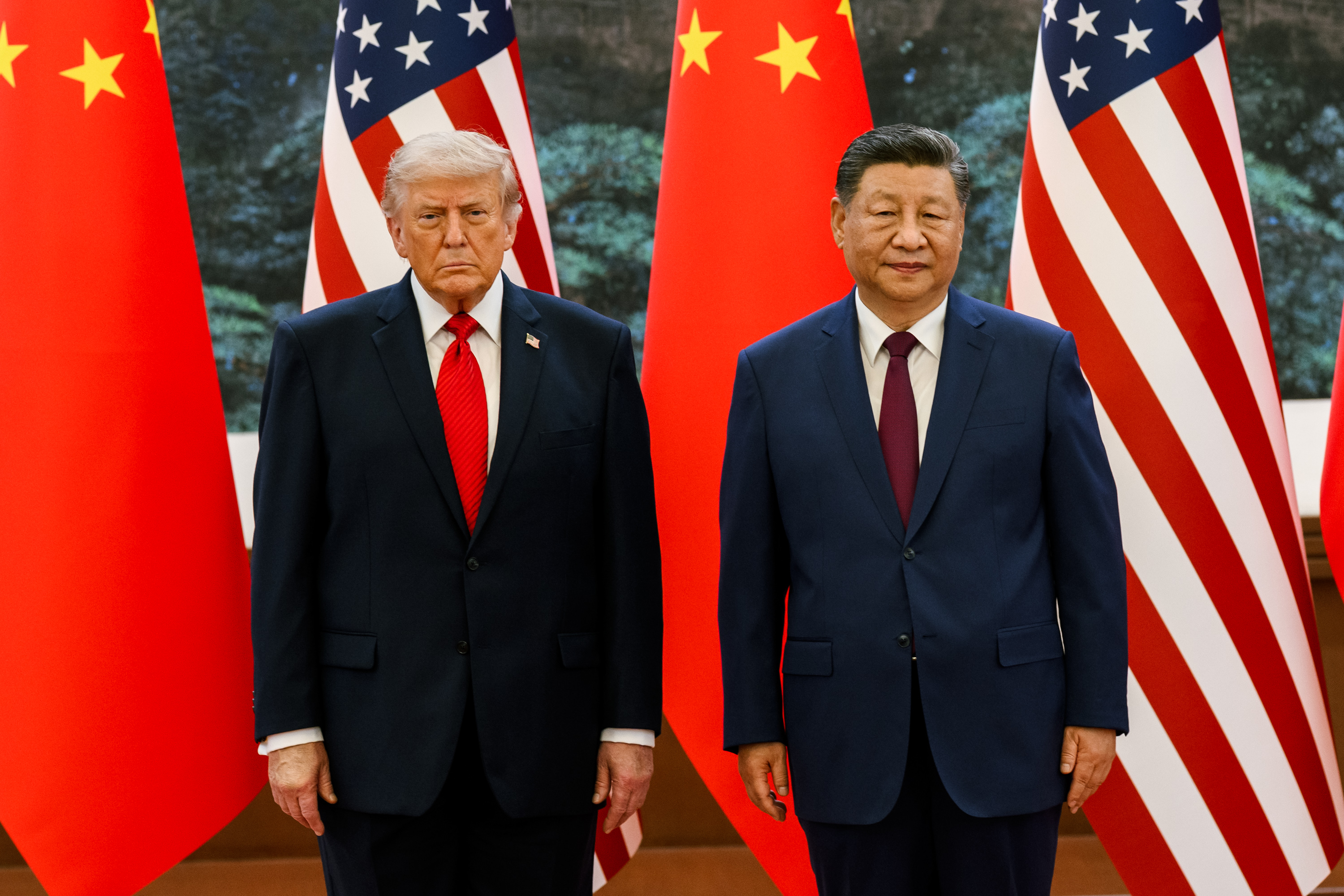
U.S. president Donald Trump and Chinese leader Xi Jinping during the former's state visit.

In January 2026, as academic Suisheng Zhao wrote in his Journal of Contemporary China editorial piece, the second Trump administration's approach to China and own governance had been much different from the first administration. Rather than depict China as "an ideological and geopolitical adversary", the US under "Trump increasingly framed China as an economic competitor". Furthermore, as Zhao further noted, the administration prioritised more on strengthening the US's authoritarianism and weakening its own democratic and liberal commitments, i.e. transforming the US into more China-like instead of the other way around.

Zhao further alleged Trump intending "a tripolar world dominated by three great powers—China in the Asia–Pacific, Russia in Eurasia, and the United States in the Western Hemisphere—echoing nineteenth-century spheres of influence". As Zhao further noted, Trump's pressures on close US allies, especially NATO, to increase their "defense spending to 5% of GDP" per country or organisation exemplified his "shift of policy priorities [that] eroded confidence in US commitments among allies in Europe and the Indo-Pacific, generating a perception that US security guarantees are now tenuously contingent on payment rather than shared strategic interests".

In March 2026, Bloomberg Opinion columnist Thomas Black questioned the United States's ability to keep stockpiles high in the light of the recent war against Iran. As Black further noted, the weapons have been "expensive to operate and complex to manufacture". As he further noted, China "has a much more developed manufacturing base than the old Soviet Union", making a Second Cold War "potentially more dangerous than the" original Cold War, and China's manufacturing capabilities have surpassed those of the US, which "has allowed its industrial base to be hollowed out over the years while supply chains splintered and moved overseas".

== Comparison to the first Cold War ==
An academic Barry Buzan wrote in the International Politics journal article that, similar to the original Cold War, the Second Cold War is deterred from turning into a "hot" war between superpowers due to the threat of mutually assured destruction and nuclear deterrence. Buzan further determined that proxy wars and half-proxy wars are found both in the first Cold War and the Second Cold War. Historian Hope M. Harrison stated in 2023 that the Cold War and the "new Cold War" between Russia and the West both have an ideological component. She said that former US presidents had spoken of the Cold War as a conflict between democracy and tyranny, Western leaders such as US president Joe Biden have called the war in Ukraine a "battle between democracy and autocracy". Putin, she says "finds the West decadent, devoid of morals and trying to impose itself on Ukraine, Russia and the rest of the world", adding that "[c]onservative parties around the world join him in criticising 'liberal extremists'".

Historian Antony Beevor stated in October 2022 that "it is no longer [about] the old divide between left and right" but rather "a change in the direction of autocracy versus democracy", a change made apparent by the Russian invasion of Ukraine; in his opinion, this cold war is "much scarier" than the first, as "one of the most worrying aspects" of the new cold war is a total disregard for diplomatic agreements. Historian Niall Ferguson said: "Cold War II is different, because in Cold War II, China's the senior partner, and Russia's the junior partner", and "in Cold War II, the first hot war breaks out in Europe, rather than Asia". Another difference in the Second Cold War is the higher economic "interdependence and centrality of network-based competition, particularly in infrastructure, finance, production, and digital networks", as stated in a September 2023 journal article of Geopolitics.

== See also ==
- CRINK
- Russia-China relations
- International relations since 1989
- List of conflicts in territory of the former Soviet Union
- List of ongoing armed conflicts
- Post–Cold War era
- Post-Western era
- Red Sea crisis
- World War III
