= Pax Silica =

US-led technology and artificial intelligence supply-chain initiative

- Motto: "Securing the Silicon Supply Chain"
- Member states of Pax Silica
- Type: International economic-security initiative
- Membership: Signatories; Argentina; Australia; Chile; Costa Rica; El Salvador; Finland; Germany; Greece; India; Israel; Italy; Japan; Kazakhstan; Netherlands; Norway; Panama; Paraguay; Philippines; Portugal; Qatar; South Korea; Singapore; Sweden; United Arab Emirates; United Kingdom; United States; European Union; Observers; Canada; Estonia; Taiwan

Leaders
  - Under Secretary of State for Economic Growth, Energy, and the Environment: Jacob Helberg

Establishment
  - Pax Silica Declaration: December 12, 2025; 11 months ago
- Website www.state.gov/pax-silica
- Today part of: Post-Cold War era

Pax Silica (Latin for 'Silicon Peace') is a United States-led international initiative focused on securing supply chains for advanced technologies such as semiconductors, artificial intelligence (AI), and rare earth elements. The initiative implicitly targets reducing reliance on China and countering its dominance in these industries.

The initiative is coordinated by the U.S. Department of State and was launched in December 2025 alongside the signing of the non-binding Pax Silica Declaration by an initial group of partner countries. It is the U.S.-led counterpart to the World Artificial Intelligence Cooperation Organization.

"We believe in mobilizing the immense creative and financial power of private industry and entrepreneurship to make our citizens more prosperous, our nations stronger, and our supply chains more secure. We seek scalable approaches and solutions to supply chain security by mobilizing the complementary industrial and technological strengths of strategic companies and firms from our respective economies"

— Pax Silica declaration

== Launch and background ==
During the 2020s, governments increasingly treated supply-chain resilience in semiconductors, critical minerals, and AI-related computing infrastructure as a national-security priority, amid export controls, industrial policy measures, and geopolitical competition over the technologies underpinning advanced manufacturing and AI. Pax Silica was presented by U.S. officials as an economic-security framework aimed at aligning policies and investment among "trusted partners" that host major technology firms and key industrial capacity. Pacific Forum's analyst Akhil Ramesh, writing for the National Interest magazine, described the initiative as understanding that: "economic security today is inseparable from control over energy, critical minerals, high-end manufacturing, and advanced models."

On December 11, 2025, the U.S. Department of State announced the inaugural Pax Silica Summit and a planned signing of the Pax Silica Declaration, describing Pax Silica as the Department's flagship effort on AI and supply-chain security. The initial summit was held in Washington, D.C. on December 12, 2025. The State Department fact sheet described cooperation areas including connectivity and data infrastructure, compute and semiconductors, advanced manufacturing, logistics, mineral refining and processing, and energy.

The initiative describes itself as a "positive-sum" partnership intended to reduce "coercive dependencies" and improve resilience across the full technology stack, from mineral extraction and processing through chip manufacturing and computing infrastructure. U.S. officials described Pax Silica as a framework for coordinating flagship projects and policy alignment across partner countries, including supply-chain mapping, investment and co-investment initiatives, and protection of critical infrastructure and sensitive technologies. Reuters reported discussions of projects linked to trade and logistics routes and an industrial park initiative in Israel. Gulf countries, such as the UAE and Qatar, are betting on attracting AI companies with cheap energy. Moreover, the UAE's potential to invest in Pax Silica's activities has been noted as a fundamental asset for the initiative. In early 2026, the U.S. announced plans to contribute $250M toward an investment consortium that's intended to strengthen energy and critical mineral supply chains.

== Membership ==
During the inauguration, seven countries signed the Pax Silica Declaration, while Taiwan, the European Union, Canada, and the Organisation for Economic Co-operation and Development participated as guests. In January 2026, Qatar and the United Arab Emirates were publicly identified as prospective signatories, with their accessions expected later that month.

=== Countries that signed the Pax Silica Declaration ===
Seven countries signed the declaration at the December 12, 2025, summit in Washington, D.C.:

- Australia
- Israel
- Japan
- South Korea
- Singapore (also member of WAICO)
- United Kingdom
- United States

Some countries who attended the initial conversations did not immediately sign, while additional countries were invited to join after the discussions concluded. The following are the later signatory members on the declaration:

- Netherlands (joined December 17, 2025; "non-signing partner")
- Qatar (joined January 13, 2026)
- United Arab Emirates (joined January 14, 2026)
- India (joined February 20, 2026)
- Sweden (signed March 17, 2026)
- Finland (signed April 16, 2026)
- Philippines (signed April 17, 2026)
- Norway (signed May 6, 2026)
- European Union (signed June 23, 2026)
- Germany (signed June 23, 2026)
- Greece (signed June 23, 2026)
- Argentina (signed June 26, 2026)
- Chile (signed June 26, 2026)
- Costa Rica (signed June 26, 2026)
- El Salvador (signed June 26, 2026)
- Kazakhstan (signed June 26, 2026; also member of WAICO)
- Panama (signed June 26, 2026)
- Paraguay (signed June 26, 2026)
- Portugal (signed June 26, 2026)
- Italy (signed July 31, 2026)

=== Countries invited / participating, but not yet signed ===
At launch, U.S. materials and contemporaneous reporting described additional invited participants and observers, including:

- Canada – observer/participant in related discussions, per U.S. briefing materials; not listed among signatories.
- Taiwan – participated in summit sessions according to a State Department briefing; not listed among signatories.
- Estonia – became an observer and signed the declaration on June 26, 2026
- Bangladesh - invited to join the initiative by U.S. special envoy Sergio Gor on August 1, 2026

The Organisation for Economic Co-operation and Development (OECD) and European Union were also noted by U.S. officials as present in an observer capacity, but are not countries.

== Reception ==
=== Pax Silica in the Philippines ===
The Pax Silica initiative in the Philippines is a proposed framework to develop a 4,000-acre industrial hub capable of supporting semiconductor manufacturing and other advanced electronic production in the Luzon Economic Corridor. Aiming to commence operations with a 1,619 hectare AI industrial hub in New Clark City, Tarlac, the agreement aims to eventually expand to support allied investment across the entire AI supply chain, seeking to reduce global reliance on Chinese made semiconductors in the process. In 2026, a report submitted by the Congressional Research Service projected that China could hold 38.2% of the global market share on mature-node chip production by 2030, a widely used category of semiconductor which accounted for 88% of global chip sales by volume in 2023.

While numerous previously established special economic zones in the Philippines exist, Pax Silica would make the designated area the first of its kind in the Philippines.

==== Reception ====
Protests against Pax Silica, November 16, 2026.

An Aeta leader speaking in a protest against Pax Silica in Manila, November 2026.

Proponents of Pax Silica argue that the attraction of foreign capital through the establishment of special economic zones (SEZ) could help stimulate the domestic semiconductor market through allowing the Philippines to move up in the production supply chain through expanding their production capabilities and technological knowledge. They emphasize, however, that the Philippine domestic market must seek policy in maintaining independence in domestic production.

Addressing growing environmental and resource concerns, Trade and Industry Undersecretary Ceferino Rodolfo maintained that the attracted foreign companies would be responsible for offsetting the social cost of the externalities brought about by their development without relying on additional governmental subsidies.

Following the Philippines' accession to the initiative in April 2026, the Pax Silica initiative was criticized by several farmers' organizations, environmental groups, civil society organizations, and political groups over issues including land use, environmental impacts, sovereignty, and foreign participation in strategic industries.

In April 2026, agricultural organizations including Kilusang Magbubukid ng Pilipinas (KMP), Pambansang Kilusan ng mga Samahang Magsasaka (PKSM), and Pambansang Lakas ng Kilusang Mamamalakaya ng Pilipinas (Pamalakaya) opposed the proposed conversion of agricultural and coastal land for industrial development. KMP described the proposed economic security zone within the Luzon Economic Corridor as a "massive sellout", stating that it could accelerate land conversion, resource extraction, environmental degradation, and the displacement of farming and fishing communities. The groups also expressed concern that the planned 4,000-acre (approximately 1,618-hectare) artificial intelligence and advanced manufacturing hub in New Clark City, Tarlac, could affect surrounding communities, food security, and existing land-use patterns.

In April 2026, the Scientists and Technologists Oppose the US War (STOP US War) coalition, a network of scientists, technologists, environmental advocates, and civil society organizations that includes AGHAM, the Computer Professionals' Union, and the Kalikasan People's Network for the Environment, opposed the initiative, stating that it could facilitate what the coalition described as "resource plunder" and environmentally harmful extractive activities. The coalition also expressed concern that the Philippines' deposits of nickel, copper, cobalt, chromite, and rare earth elements could become increasingly integrated into foreign-led supply chains supporting artificial intelligence, semiconductor manufacturing, and other advanced technologies. It further argued that the initiative could reinforce the country's role as a supplier of raw materials while higher-value manufacturing and technological development remained concentrated abroad.

Some advocacy groups also cited proposed cooperation with Israel on critical minerals, artificial intelligence, and cybersecurity as an additional concern. Their criticism followed remarks by Israeli Ambassador to the Philippines Dana Kursh, who said that the Philippines' abundant nickel and other critical minerals could complement Israel's expertise in artificial intelligence, chip design, cybersecurity, and other technological fields, describing the Philippines as a potential partner in the initiative.

Environmental organizations also raised concerns about the environmental impacts of semiconductor and artificial intelligence infrastructure, citing high electricity and water consumption, increased demand for critical minerals, and industrial waste management challenges associated with advanced manufacturing facilities.

Some activist groups also criticized the initiative's relationship with broader United States–Philippines economic and security cooperation. They argued that integrating critical-mineral extraction, semiconductor manufacturing, and artificial intelligence infrastructure with strategic economic corridors could increase the Philippines' exposure to geopolitical competition and make industrial facilities potential targets during regional conflicts.

In May 2026, members of the left-wing Makabayan Bloc raised concerns regarding sovereignty and governance arrangements associated with the initiative, including reports of proposed special legal arrangements for foreign personnel. Makabayan representatives argued that such arrangements could raise constitutional and sovereignty issues, while government agencies and project proponents maintained that the development would remain subject to Philippine law and regulatory oversight.

A dispute also emerged over the legal status of the proposed Pax Silica economic security zone in New Clark City. On May 18, 2026, during a site visit by U.S. Undersecretary of State for Economic Affairs Jacob Helberg, Bases Conversion and Development Authority (BCDA) President Joshua Bingcang said that the United States had requested that the zone operate under U.S. law and that U.S. personnel be granted diplomatic immunity. According to Bingcang, the Philippine government rejected the proposal and maintained that the project would remain subject to Philippine law and jurisdiction.

On May 25, 2026, Helberg denied reports that the United States had sought diplomatic immunity, stating in a post on X that his earlier remarks had been "taken out of context" and that the U.S. position was intended to provide legal certainty and predictability for investors rather than diplomatic immunity. A spokesperson for the United States Department of State later declined to directly address the discrepancy between Helberg's account and statements made by Philippine officials.

Protest of indigenous peoples against Pax Silica and Donald Trump, November 17, 2026

Massive anti-Pax Silica protests were held by progressive groups leading to the 49th ASEAN Summit from November 15-17 that also included the participation of US President Donald Trump. The protesters were met with force from the police. Political prisoners solidarity group KAPATID denounced the mass arrest in a single day as eclipsing the record of Marcos Jr.'s father, President Ferdinand Marcos Sr. under his martial law. They said that the jump from 551 to 857 political prisoners in a single day was an "international embarrassment."

=== European Union ===
In May and June 2026, some policymakers and analysts in the European Union raised concerns regarding regulatory autonomy and the bloc's relationship with United States technology policies as discussions on accession progressed. Critics argued that participation could affect the EU's strategic autonomy in areas such as export controls and semiconductor policy, while supporters maintained that the initiative would strengthen supply-chain resilience among partner economies.

=== Netherlands ===
In June 2026, discussion surrounding the initiative in the Netherlands focused on export-control policies affecting the Dutch semiconductor industry, particularly ASML. Some officials and industry representatives expressed concern that additional restrictions on technology exports to China could affect commercial operations and competitiveness.

=== India ===
From late 2025 through early 2026, discussion in India centered on the country's absence from the initiative's original membership. Some commentators and opposition politicians questioned India's exclusion despite its growing semiconductor sector and participation in other technology partnerships.

== See also ==
- CHIPS and Science Act
- Critical minerals
- Economic security
- Friendshoring
- List of DRAM manufacturers
- Minerals Security Partnership
- San Francisco Declaration on the Secure Foundations of Enduring Prosperity
- Second Cold War
- Silicon shield
- World Artificial Intelligence Cooperation Organization
