= Global Partnership on Artificial Intelligence =

International initiative

- Formation: 15 June 2020; 6 years ago
- Purpose: Intergovernmental cooperation in advancing the appropriate use of artificial intelligence
- Locations: Paris, France; Montreal, Canada
- Region served: Global
- Fields: Artificial intelligence
- Members: Countries: Argentina; Australia; Belgium; Brazil; Canada; Czech Republic; Denmark; France; Germany; India; Ireland; Israel; Italy; Japan; Mexico; Netherlands; New Zealand; Poland; South Korea; Senegal; Serbia; Singapore; Slovenia; Spain; Sweden; Turkey; United Kingdom; United States; European Union; Invited members: Austria; Chile; Finland; Malaysia; Norway; Slovakia; Switzerland
- Key people: Steering Committee Co-Chairs: Yoichi Iida Inma Martinez
- Main organ: A council and a steering committee
- Affiliations: Hosted by the Organisation for Economic Co-operation and Development (OECD)
- Website: gpai.ai

The Global Partnership on Artificial Intelligence (GPAI, pronounced "gee-pay") is an international initiative established to guide the responsible development and use of artificial intelligence (AI) in a manner that respects human rights and the shared democratic values of its members. The partnership was first proposed by Canada and France at the 2018 44th G7 summit, and officially launched in June 2020. GPAI is hosted by the Organisation for Economic Co-operation and Development (OECD).

GPAI seeks to bridge the gap between theory and practice by supporting research and applied activities in areas that are directly relevant to policymakers in the realm of AI. It brings together experts from industry, civil society, governments, and academia to collaborate on the challenges and opportunities presented by artificial intelligence.

== History ==
The Global Partnership on Artificial Intelligence was announced on the margins of the 2018 G7 Summit by Canadian Prime Minister Justin Trudeau and French President Emmanuel Macron. It officially launched on 15 June 2020 with fifteen founding members: Australia, Canada, France, Germany, India, Italy, Japan, Mexico, New Zealand, the Republic of Korea, Singapore, Slovenia, the United Kingdom, the United States, and the European Union.

The Organisation for Economic Co-operation and Development (OECD) hosts a dedicated secretariat to support GPAI's governing bodies and activities. UNESCO joined the partnership in December 2020 as an observer. On 11 November 2021, Czechia, Israel and few more EU countries also joined the GPAI, bringing the total membership to 25 countries. Since the November 2022 summit, the list of members stands at 29.

Austria, Chile, Finland, Malaysia, Norway, Slovakia and Switzerland were invited. The seven, however, are pending membership approval.

== Membership ==
The following 29 members of the GPAI are:

- Argentina
- Australia
- Austria
- Belgium
- Brazil
- Canada
- Chile
- Czech Republic
- Denmark
- Finland
- France
- Germany
- India
- (Republic of Ireland) Ireland
- Israel
- Italy
- Japan
- Mexico
- Netherlands
- New Zealand
- Norway
- Poland
- (South Korea) Republic of Korea
- Senegal
- Serbia
- Singapore
- Slovakia
- Slovenia
- Spain
- Sweden
- Switzerland
- Turkey
- United Kingdom
- United States
- European Union

Invited members:

- Malaysia (pending membership approval)

== Organization ==
GPAI's experts collaborate across several Working Groups themes: Responsible AI (including an ad-hoc subgroup on AI and Pandemic Response), Data Governance, Future of Work, and Innovation & Commercialization. GPAI's Working Groups are supported by two Centres of Expertise: one in Montreal that supports the first two Working Groups, and one in Paris that supports the latter two. It also has a Steering Committee, the elected chair of which has also been to date elected chair of the Multi Stakeholder Group (MEG). These chairs have been:

- Jordan Zed and Baroness Joanna Shields (Shields, MEG chair; 2020-2021),
- Joanna Shields and Renaud Vedel (Shields, MEG chair; 2021-2022),
- Yoichi Iida and Inma Martinez (Martinez, MEG chair; 2023-2024)

GPAI has a rotating presidency and host (much like the G7). The presidencies to date have been:

- Canada (2020)
- France (2021)
- Japan (2022)
- India (2023)

== See also ==
- World Artificial Intelligence Cooperation Organization - an international organization focused on artificial intelligence headquartered in Shanghai and oriented toward the Global South.
