= Igor Zevelev =

Russian political scientist

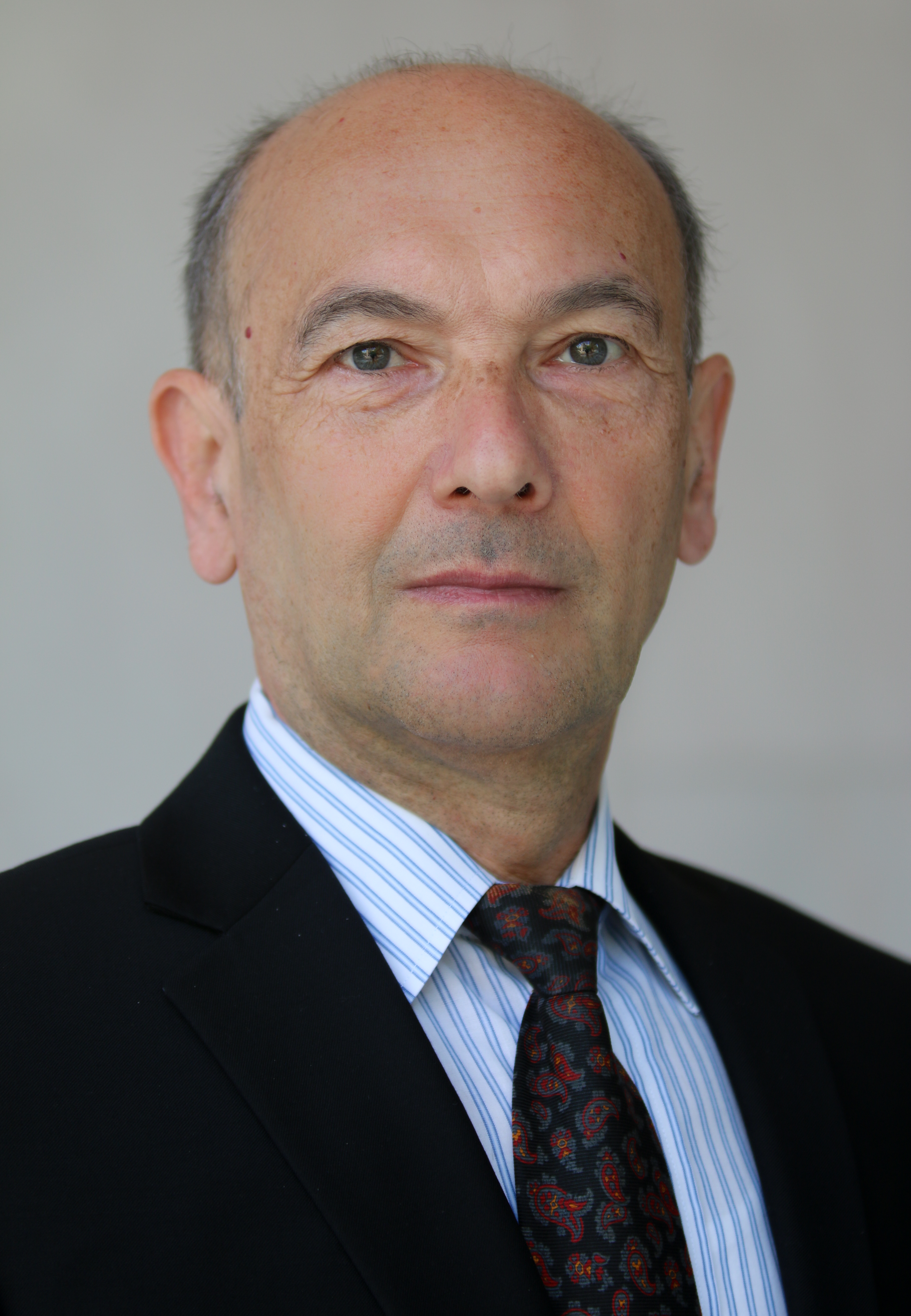
- Born: Tashkent, former Soviet Union
- Education: The Institute of Asian and African Countries at Lomonosov Moscow State University
- Occupations: Political scientist and author
- Spouse: Galina Zeveleva
- Scientific career
- Fields: Political science, security studies, international relations

Igor Alexandrovich Zevelev (Russian: Игорь Александрович Зевелëв) is a Russian political scientist.

== Youth and education ==
Igor Zevelev was born in Tashkent, former USSR. In 1966, when he was ten years old, he moved to Moscow with his parents and sister. In 1978 he graduated from the Institute of Asian and African Countries at Lomonosov Moscow State University, where he majored in history and studied Burmese, Chinese, and English. Zevelev defended his Ph.D. in history at Lomonosov Moscow State University in 1982.

In 1992, he defended his Doctor of Sciences degree (the highest academic rank in Russia) in political science at the Institute of World Economy and International Relations (IMEMO) in Moscow.

== Career ==
Igor Zevelev has had an academic and research career intertwined with leadership positions in the fields of philanthropy and journalism.

After graduating from Lomonosov Moscow State University's Institute of Asian and African Countries, Igor Zevelev embarked upon an academic career. From 1981 to 1988, he worked as a research fellow at Moscow Institute of Oriental Studies. From 1988 to 1999, he served as Deputy Director and Head of Department at the Center for Developing Countries at the Moscow Institute of World Economy and International Relations (IMEMO).

In 1992, Igor Zevelev was invited as visiting professor to the University of Washington in Seattle, Washington. This was the first of several visiting professorships in the United States. Throughout the 1990s, he taught at San Jose State University, at the University of California, Berkeley, at the Jackson School of International Studies of the University of Washington, and at Macalester College. Zevelev taught courses pertaining to Russian area studies and security studies, international relations, nationalism, human rights, great powers and comparative democracy.

In 2000, Zevelev left the United States for a teaching position at the George C. Marshall European Center for Security Studies in Garmisch-Partenkirchen, Germany, where he worked as professor of Russian studies for five years.

In 2005, Zevelev returned to Washington, DC to serve as Washington Bureau Chief for the RIA Novosti Russian News and Information Agency.

In 2008, Igor Zevelev returned to Moscow from the United States and took up the position of Director of the John D. and Catherine T. MacArthur Foundation's Russia office. The MacArthur Foundation has awarded more than $173 million in grants to further higher education in Russia, advance human rights, and limit the proliferation of nuclear weapons. After the Foundation’s Russia office was closed down, Igor Zevelev continued his research in the United States.

He was a Fellow at the Woodrow Wilson International Center for Scholars and the Center for Security and International Studies (CSIS) in Washington in 2016-2017. He also taught at the School of Advanced International Studies (SAIS) of Johns Hopkins University in 2017. In 2017–2019, Igor Zevelev worked as Professor of National Security Studies at the George C. Marshall European Center for Security Studies. He was a Global Fellow at the Wilson Center in 2020-2022.

Igor Zevelev has been awarded several research grants in the United States and Europe for research topics pertaining to Russian foreign policy, international relations and security studies. These awards include the Woodrow Wilson Fellowship (1996–1997 and 2016–2017) and the Jennings Randolph Program for International Peace Senior Fellowship (1997–1998).

Igor Zevelev was a member of the Valdai Discussion Club in 2005–2013. He was also the Donors Forum Council member in 2009-2014 and a member of the Sustainable Partnership with Russia (SuPR) Group at the PIR Center in 2010–2014.

== Research focus ==
Igor Zevelev has published five books and about sixty academic articles. Coming from an academic background in history and Asian studies, Igor Zevelev began his research with the topics of urbanization and development in Southeast Asia and human rights in Asian countries during the late 1980s and early 1990s. More recently Zevelev has turned to international politics and worked on Russian foreign policy, Russia–United States relations, Russia-US-China relations and international security.

One of his major contributions to the fields of political science and post-Soviet studies was his single-authored book Russia and its New Diasporas (US Institute of Peace Press 2001), written during Zevelev’s stay at the United States Institute of Peace and the Wilson Center. In this book, he examines the political significance of new ethnic Russian “diaspora” communities for the future of Eurasian and international security. Zevelev poses questions about Russia’s national identity, territorial reach, and political influence. Zevelev draws from literature on ethnicity, identity and nationalism analyses the Russian Federation’s official policies towards Russian diaspora over time.

Most of Igor Zevelev’s current work focuses on Russian-American and Russian-Chinese relations, as well as Russian national identity and foreign policy. He places these problems into a broad international comparative context. These efforts are reflected in “Russia’s Contested National Identity and Foreign Policy,” (co-authored with Andrew Kuchins), in Henry Nau and Deepa Ollapally, eds., Worldviews of Aspiring Powers (New York, NY: Oxford University Press, 2012); “Russian Perspectives on US-China Relations and the Twenty-First-Century Global System,” in Aharon Klieman, ed., Great Powers and Geopolitics. International Affairs in a Rebalancing World (Springer, 2015); and Russian National Identity and Foreign Policy (Washington, DC: CSIS Report, 2016).

== Books ==
- Russia and Its New Diasporas (Washington, DC: The United States Institute of Peace Press, 2001).
- Co-edited with Sharyl Cross, Global Security Beyond the Millennium: American and Russian Perspectives (London: Macmillan Press, 1999).
- Modern Asia: Political Development and Human Rights (Moscow: IMEMO, 1991), in Russian.
- Urbanization and Development in Asia (Moscow: Progress Publishers, 1989), in English; (Moscow: Progress Publishers, 1990), in Bengali; (Moscow-Delhi-Jaipur: Progress Publishers-People's Publishing House-Rajasthan People's Publishing House, 1990), in Hindi.
- Southeast Asia: Urbanization and Problems of Social Development (Moscow: Nauka Publishers, 1985), in Russian.
