= Emilian Kavalski =

Bulgarian-Australian political scientist and international relations scholar

Academic background
- Education: Veliko Tarnovo University; University of Warwick; Loughborough University
- Thesis: Peace in the Balkans: the influence of Euro-Atlantic actors in the promotion of security-community-relations in southeastern Europe (2005)
- Doctoral advisor: Mark Webber

Emilian Kavalski is a Bulgarian-Australian political scientist and international relations scholar. He is Professor of International Relations at Tampere University, Finland . Since 2014, he has served as the book series editor for Routledge’s Rethinking Asia and International Relations series. Prior to joining Tampere University, Emilian was the inaugural NAWA Chair Professor in the Centre for International Studies and Development at the Jagiellonian University in Krakow, Poland, the Li Dak-Sum Chair Professor in China-Eurasia Relations and International Studies and the founding Director of the Global Institute of Silk Roads Studies at the University of Nottingham Ningbo China (2018-2021). In 2006, he completed his PhD in International Relations at the Loughborough University. Kavalski was a Senior Lecturer in Politics and International Relations at the Western Sydney University (2008-2013), and then a Research Associate Professor of Global Studies in the Institute for Social Justice at the Australian Catholic University (2014-2018).

Emilian's work explores the interconnections between the simultaneous decentering of International Relations by post-Western perspectives and non-anthropocentric approaches.

== Works ==
=== Monographs ===
- The Guanxi of Relational International Theory (2021)
- Central Asia and the Rise of Normative Powers: Contextualizing the Security Governance of the European Union, China, and India (2012)
- India and Central Asia: The Mythmaking and International Relations of a Rising Power (2009)
- Extending the European Security Community: Constructing Peace in the Balkans (2008)

=== Single-edited books ===
- The Ashgate Research Companion to Chinese Foreign Policy (2016)
- Stable Outside, Fragile Inside? Post-Soviet Statehood in Central Asia (2016)
- China and the Global Politics of Regionalization (2016)
- World Politics at the Edge of Chaos: Reflections on Complexity and Global Life (2015)
- Encounters with World Affairs: An Introduction to International Relations (2015)
- The New Central Asia: The Regional Impact of International Actors (2010)

=== Co-edited books ===
- The Routledge Handbook on Global China (2025) with Maximilian Mayer, Marina Rudyak, and Xin Zhang
- China’s Rise and Rethinking International Relations Theory (2022) with Chengxin Pan
- Posthuman Dialogues in International Relations (2021) with Erika Cudworth and Stephen Hobden
- Defunct Federalisms: Critical Perspectives on Federal Failure (2016) with Magdalena Zolkos
- Power Transition in Asia(2016) with David Walton
- Asian Thought on China's Changing International Relations (2014) with Niv Horesh
