= Endless Frontier =

Endless Frontier may refer to:

- Science, The Endless Frontier, a 1945 report by Vannevar Bush to the President of the United States
- Endless Frontier: Vannevar Bush, Engineer of the American Century
- U.S. Innovation and Competition Act. formerly known as the Endless Frontier Act
- Super Robot Taisen OG Saga: Endless Frontier
- Endless Frontier, an ongoing sci-fi fantasy series by Brett Lurie.
