= CHIPS and Science Act =

United States legislation promoting the semiconductor industry and public basic research

- Other short titles: CHIPS Act of 2022; Research and Development, Competition, and Innovation Act; Supreme Court Security Funding Act of 2022
- Long title: Making appropriations for Legislative Branch for the fiscal year ending September 30, 2022, and for other purposes
- Nicknames: CHIPS-Plus
- Enacted by: the 117th United States Congress
- Effective: August 9, 2022

Citations
- Public law: Pub. L. 117–167 (text) (PDF)
- Statutes at Large: 136 Stat. 1366

Legislative history
- Introduced in the House of Representatives as H.R. 4346 the Supreme Court Security Funding Act of 2022 by Tim Ryan (D–OH) on July 1, 2021; Committee consideration by House Appropriations; Passed the House on July 28, 2021 (215–207); Passed the Senate as the Chips and Science Act on July 27, 2022 (64–33) with amendment; House agreed to Senate amendment on July 28, 2022 (243–187–1); Signed into law by President Joe Biden on August 9, 2022

The CHIPS and Science Act is a U.S. federal statute enacted by the 117th United States Congress and signed into law by President Joe Biden on August 9, 2022. The act authorizes roughly $280 billion in new funding to boost domestic research and manufacturing of semiconductors in the United States, for which it appropriates $52.7 billion. The act includes $39 billion in subsidies for chip manufacturing on U.S. soil along with 25% investment tax credits for costs of manufacturing equipment, and $13 billion for semiconductor research and workforce training, with the dual aim of strengthening American supply chain resilience and countering China. It also invests $174 billion in the overall ecosystem of public sector research in science and technology, advancing human spaceflight, quantum computing, materials science, biotechnology, experimental physics, research security, social and ethical considerations, workforce development and diversity, equity, and inclusion efforts at NASA, NSF, DOE, EDA, and NIST.

The act does not have an official short title as a whole but is divided into three divisions with their own short titles: Division A is the CHIPS Act of 2022 (where CHIPS stands for the former "Creating Helpful Incentives to Produce Semiconductors" for America Act); Division B is the Research and Development, Competition, and Innovation Act; and Division C is the Supreme Court Security Funding Act of 2022.

By March 2024, analysts estimated that the act incentivized between 25 and 50 separate potential projects, with total projected investments of $160–200 billion and 25,000–45,000 new jobs. However, these projects are faced with delays in receiving grants due to bureaucratic hurdles, shortages of skilled workers, and congressional funding deals that have limited or cut research provisions of the Act by tens of billions of dollars.

== History ==
The CHIPS and Science Act combines two bipartisan bills: the Endless Frontier Act, designed to boost investment in domestic high-tech research, and the CHIPS for America Act, designed to bring semiconductor manufacturing back to the U.S. The act is aimed at competing with China.

The Endless Frontier Act was initially presented to senators Chuck Schumer (D-NY) and Todd Young (R-IN) by Under Secretary of State Keith Krach in October 2019, as part of the Global Economic Security Strategy to boost investment in high-tech research vital to U.S. national security. The plan was to grow $150 billion in government R&D funding into a $500 billion investment, with matching investments from the private sector and a coalition of technological allies dubbed the "Techno-Democracies-10" (TD-10). On May 27, 2020, Young and Schumer, along with Congressmen Ro Khanna (D-CA) and Mike Gallagher (R-WI.), introduced the bipartisan, bicameral Endless Frontier Act to solidify the United States' leadership in scientific and technological innovation through increased investments in the discovery, creation, and commercialization of technology fields of the future.

The United States Innovation and Competition Act of 2021 (USICA) (S. 1260), formerly known as the Endless Frontier Act, was United States legislation sponsored by Schumer and Young authorizing $110 billion for basic and advanced technology research over a five-year period. Investment in basic and advanced research, commercialization, and education and training programs in artificial intelligence, semiconductors, quantum computing, advanced communications, biotechnology and advanced energy, amounts to $100 billion. Over $10 billion was authorized for appropriation to designate ten regional technology hubs and create a supply chain crisis-response program.

The CHIPS for America Act portion stemmed from Krach and his team brokering the $12 billion on-shoring of TSMC (Taiwan Semiconductor Manufacturing Company) to secure the supply chain of sophisticated semiconductors, on May 15, 2020. Krach's stated strategy was to use the TSMC announcement as a stimulus for fortifying a trusted supply chain by attracting TSMC's broad ecosystem of suppliers; persuading other chip companies to produce in U.S., especially Intel and Samsung; inspiring universities to develop engineering curricula focused on semiconductor manufacturing and designing a bipartisan bill (CHIPS for America) to provide the necessary funding. This led to Krach and his team's close collaboration in creating the CHIPS for America component with senators John Cornyn (R-TX) and Mark Warner (D-VA). In June 2020, Senator Warner joined U.S. senator John Cornyn in introducing the $52 billion CHIPS for America Act. Elements of the Bioeconomy Research and Development Act of 2021 were also included.

Both bills were eventually merged into the U.S. Innovation and Competition Act (USICA). On June 8, 2021, the USICA passed 68–32 in the Senate with bipartisan support. The House version of the Bill, America COMPETES Act of 2022 (H.R. 4521), passed on February 4, 2022. The Senate passed an amended bill by substituting the text of H.R. 4521 with the text of the USICA on March 28, 2022. A Senate and House conference was required to reconcile the differences, which resulted in the bipartisan CHIPS and Science Act, or "CHIPS Plus". The bill passed the U.S. Senate by a vote of 64–33 on July 27, 2022. On July 28, the $280 billion bill passed the U.S. House by a vote of 243–187–1. On August 1, 2022, the magazine EE Times (Electronic Engineering) dubbed Under Secretary of State Keith Krach (as of February 2023, now the current Chairman of the Krach Institute for Tech Diplomacy at Purdue University) the architect of the CHIPS and Science Act. The bill was signed into law by President Joe Biden on August 9, 2022.

== Background and provisions ==
President Joe Biden delivers remarks on the CHIPS and Science Act at a semiconductor fabrication plant in Clay, New York, April 25, 2024.

The law constitutes an industrial policy initiative which takes place against the background of a perceived AI Cold War between the US and China, as artificial intelligence technology relies on semiconductors. The law was considered amidst a global semiconductor shortage and intended to provide subsidies and tax credits to chip makers with operations in the United States. The U.S. Department of Commerce was granted the power to allocate funds based on companies' willingness to sustain research, build facilities, and train new workers.

For semiconductor and telecommunications purposes, the CHIPS Act designates roughly $106 billion. The CHIPS Act includes $39 billion in tax benefits, loan guarantees and grants, administered by the DOC to encourage American companies to build new chip manufacturing plants in the U.S. Additionally, $11 billion would go toward advanced semiconductor research and development, separable into $8.5 billion of that total going to the National Institute for Standards and Technology, $500 million to Manufacturing USA, and $2 billion to a new public research hub called the National Semiconductor Technology Center. $24 billion would go to a new 25 percent advanced semiconductor manufacturing tax credit to encourage firms to stay in the United States, and $200 million would go to the National Science Foundation to resolve short-term labor supply issues.

According to McKinsey, "The CHIPS Act allocates $2 billion to the Department of Defense to fund microelectronics research, fabrication, and workforce training. An additional $500 million goes to the Department of State to coordinate with foreign-government partners on semiconductor supply chain security. And $1.5 billion funds the USA Telecommunications Act of 2020, which aims to enhance competitiveness of software and hardware supply chains of open RAN 5G networks." (The open RAN research innovation fund is controlled by the National Telecommunications and Information Administration.) Companies are subjected to a 10-year ban prohibiting them from producing chips more advanced than 28 nanometers in China and Russia if they are awarded subsidies under the law.

The law authorizes $174 billion for uses other than semiconductor and telecom technologies. It authorizes, but does not appropriate, extended NASA funding for the International Space Station to 2030, partially funds the Artemis program returning humans to the Moon, and directs NASA to establish a Moon to Mars Program Office for a human mission to Mars beyond the Artemis program. The law also obligates NASA to perform research into further domesticating its supply chains and diversifying and developing its workforce, reducing the environmental effects of aviation, integrating unmanned aerial vehicle detection with air traffic control, investigating nuclear propulsion for spacecraft, continuing the search for extraterrestrial intelligence and xenology efforts, and boosting astronomical surveys for Near-Earth objects including the NEO Surveyor project.

The law could potentially invest $67 billion in accelerating advanced zero-emissions technologies (such as improved energy storage, hydrogen economy technologies, and carbon capture and storage) to mass markets, advancing building efficiency, and improving climate science research, according to the climate action think tank Rocky Mountain Institute. The law would invest $81 billion in the NSF, including new money for STEM education (it recommends $100 million in rural schools, a 50 percent increase in Noyce Teaching Scholarships, and $300 million in a "STEM Teacher Corps") and defense against foreign intellectual property infringement, and $20 billion in the new Directorate for Technology, Innovation, and Partnerships, which would be tasked with deploying the above technologies as well as promoting social and ethical considerations, and authorizes but does not appropriate $12 billion for ARPA-E. For the United States Department of Energy the law creates a new 501(c)(3) organization, the Foundation for Energy Security and Innovation, to leverage philanthropy for improving the workforce and bolstering energy research. It contains annual DOE budget increases for other purposes including supercomputer, nuclear fusion and particle accelerator research as well as minority-serving institution outreach and workforce development for teachers, and directs the DOC to establish $10 billion worth of research hubs in post-industrial rural and urban communities that have been subjected to historical underinvestment.

As a national security law, the law contains a variety of provisions related to research ethics, foreign talent recruitment, restrictions on Confucius Institutes, and establishing new research security initiatives in the DOE, NIST, and the NSF.

The law makes extensive recommendations to the NSF to add social, legal, and ethical considerations to the award process in all of its research activities, hinting at an embrace of public participatory technology assessment; the law does not invoke an NSF doctrine called the "broader impacts criterion" to do so. The law invests roughly $90 billion in strengthening and diversifying the STEM workforce through 33 programs, many of them incorporated deeply in the aforementioned semiconductor incentive, NSF labor supply, Tech Hubs, and DoD microelectronics R&D efforts; beyond those, the law authorizes $2.8 billion for standalone education projects, creates a Chief Diversity Officer position and codifies the Eddie Bernice Johnson INCLUDES Network to serve as the NSF's main diversity, equity, and inclusion program. The law expands NSF demographic data collection and workplace inclusion efforts, and help to grantees in caregiver roles and the fight against sexual harassment. The law emphasizes skilled technical jobs that do not require a bachelor's degree, and directs grant applicants to closely integrate workforce initiatives with job training; notably, it does not invest in the United States Department of Labor to carry this out.

== Passage ==
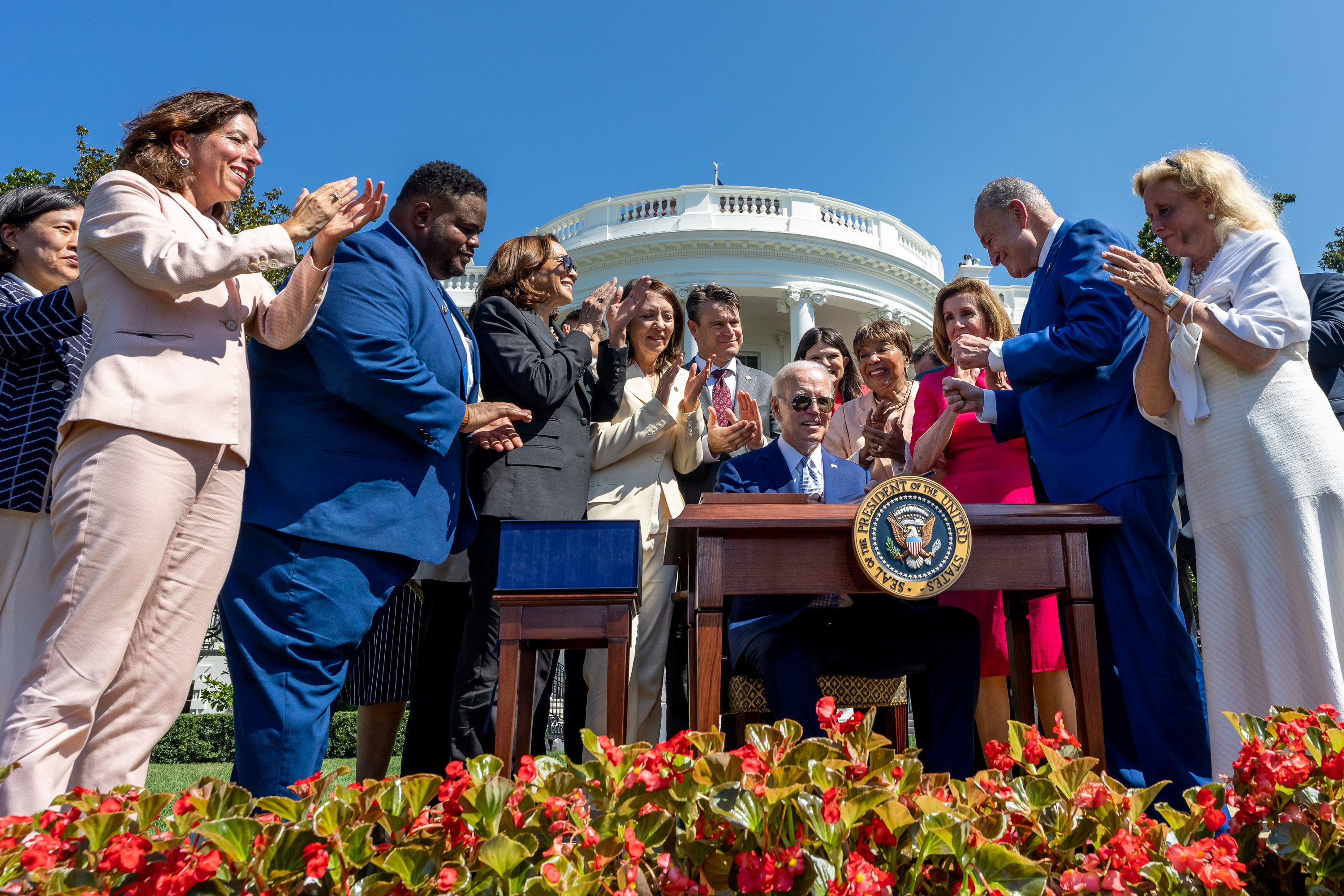
President Joe Biden signing the bill into law on the South Lawn of the White House on August 9, 2022

July 27, 2022 Senate vote by state Two yeas Yea and not voting Yea and nay Two nays Nay and not voting

July 28, 2022 House vote by congressional district Democratic yea (219) Democratic "present" (1) Republican yea (24) Republican nay (187)

Every senator in the Senate Democratic Caucus except for Bernie Sanders voted in favor of passing the CHIPS Act, and they were joined by seventeen Republican senators, including Senate Republican leader Mitch McConnell, Utah senator Mitt Romney, and South Carolina senator Lindsey Graham.

== Reception ==
=== Support ===
Many legislators and elected officials from across both the federal government and various state governments endorsed the passage. A large group of governors consisting of Pennsylvania's Tom Wolf, Alabama's Kay Ivey, California's Gavin Newsom, Kentucky's Andy Beshear, Michigan's Gretchen Whitmer, Wisconsin's Tony Evers, Illinois' J. B. Pritzker, Kansas' Laura Kelly, and North Carolina's Roy Cooper pushed for the passage of the bill back in November 2021.

Separately, Ohio governor Mike DeWine, whose state became the home of Intel's newest semiconductor fabrication plant in the Columbus suburb of New Albany, as well as Texas governor Greg Abbott and Texas senator John Cornyn, whose state was the home of a major investment from Samsung, each pushed for the bill to be passed and applauded its advancement through Congress. It has received widespread support from chip firms, though they were concerned about the provision banning them from further investments in China.

Intel's then-CEO Pat Gelsinger said during an earnings call on September 30, 2022, that CHIPS Act subsidies were leading the company to explore building empty fab buildings (known as a "shell-first strategy") and aggressively acquire smaller competitors before installing any equipment, to avoid contributing to a predicted semiconductor glut.

=== Opposition ===
The bill was criticized by Republican House leader Kevin McCarthy and senator Bernie Sanders as a "blank check", which the latter equated to a bribe to semiconductor companies. China lobbied against the bill and criticized it as being "reminiscent of a 'Cold War mentality'".

=== Concerns of protectionism ===
In a piece for the Brookings Institution on December 20, 2022, Sarah Kreps and Paul Timmers expressed concerns regarding the protectionist provisions of the CHIPS and Science Act and the risk of a subsidy race with the EU, which proposed its own European Chips Act in 2022.

=== Concerns of poor workforce development ===
In a piece for Brookings on May 25, 2023, Annelies Goger and Banu Ozkazanc-Pan found the Act was vague in many of its workforce development provisions, and criticized the statute for failing to offer a comprehensive, 'wraparound' approach to workforce development. They focused on its lack of supportive provisions for closing racial and gender gaps in STEM, its lack of requirements for equitable access to child care and non-academic mentorship programs beyond well-resourced communities, and its piecemeal approach to the innovation cycle. Seven months later, Brookings staffers Martha Ross and Mark Muro also said the act's workforce provisions reflected a fragmented approach and their costs were difficult to determine. The Department of Commerce's Office of the Inspector General criticized the CHIPS Program and R&D Offices in particular for not crafting a plan for their own workforce development, though the OIG did note that they exceeded their hiring goals due to optimizing for speed and meeting national security goals.

=== Environmental concerns ===
Writing in the Substack climate and finance newsletter The Gigaton, Stanford MBA students Georgia Carroll and Zac Maslia criticized the Act for lacking incentives to add renewable energy to chipmakers' base loads, and reclaimed water and PFAS alternatives to their material inputs, and noted the extensive environmental impact of the chipmaker and data center industry was at odds with the output from the new research programs of the Act.

=== Concerns of inaction on unions, stock buybacks ===
Robert Kuttner, economic nationalist commentator and editor of The American Prospect, expressed concerns that the bill did not provide enough resources to allow local residents near fabs to organize or form a trade union (thereby making unions rely too heavily on community benefits agreements compared to federal policy), that the Commerce Department would be too friendly to states with right-to-work laws (where the first new fabs would be built), that the bill did not restrictively define a "domestic company" regarding financing, and that fab owners would simply use CHIPS Act money to buy back stocks. In response to these concerns, on February 28, 2023, United States Secretary of Commerce Gina Raimondo published the first application for CHIPS Act grants, which encourages fab operators to use Project Labor Agreements for facilitating union negotiations during construction, outline their plans to curtail stock buybacks, share excess profits with the federal government, and open or point out nearby child care facilities. The application led to over 200 statements of interest from private companies within the first month and a half, looking to invest across the entire semiconductor supply chain in 35 states; by June 2023, the number had reached over 300. The Prospect later covered the lack of progress in PLA talks between key investor TSMC and local unions in Phoenix, and included both author Lee Harris's claim that the Raimondo guidance was insufficient in helping the talks, and liberal commentator Ezra Klein's criticism of the Raimondo guidance as excessive. Harris later reported that as a consequence TSMC and its non-union subcontractors had routinely engaged in alleged wage theft, underreported safety violations, and cut out various installation procedures that would have prevented costly repairs, delaying its projects.

=== Antitrust concerns ===
In February 2024, the antitrust think tank American Economic Liberties Project released a report evaluating the state of the semiconductor industry after the CHIPS and Science Act passed. It found that the Act was insufficient in dealing with what it saw as the effective monopolization and monopsony of the American semiconductor industry by TSMC and by 'fabless' semiconductor firms that practiced routine outsourcing, such as Nvidia and Apple Inc., the result of shareholder-driven decisions. It also found the Act was insufficient in shoring up American mid-level, consumer market-oriented manufacturing by increasing competition and resiliency there. It recommended that the Commerce Department increasingly involve the Federal Trade Commission and other antitrust agencies in its decision-making, incubate four mid-size competitors to TSMC, require 'fabless' firms to double their source numbers, and strategically levy tariffs and fees on select consumer electronics deemed lacking in American sourcing.

== Impact ==
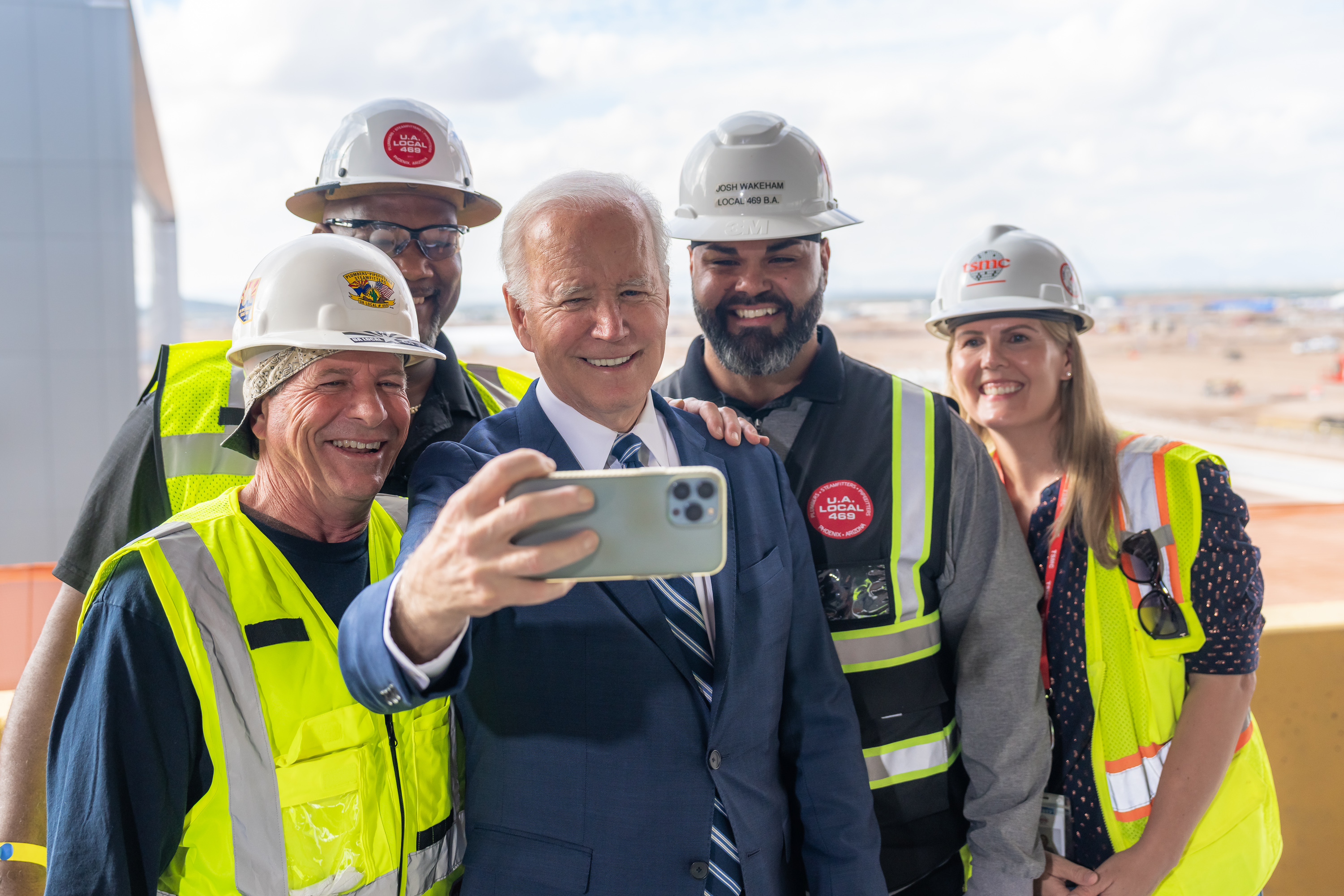
President Biden taking a selfie with construction workers at a TSMC plant in Arizona, December 2022

=== Science impact ===
In August 2023, around the one-year anniversary of the act becoming law, the NSF released a fact sheet outlining what it had done in the first year. Notably, the Technology, Innovation and Partnerships Directorate had awarded more than 760 grants and signed 18 contracts in research and development, and incentivized $4 billion in private capital and 35 exits from federal seed funding for private companies; the NSF issued two letters to employees on research security, increased STEM scholarship amounts, and created a National Secure Data Service per the act's directives. The DOE also issued a press release to commemorate the anniversary, noting materials science, quantum computing and biotechnology had received major attention from the act, as well as efforts to improve energy use, materials sourcing transparency and recycling of computer chips.

On the second anniversary of the Act becoming law, the NSF put out an updated fact sheet. The TIP Directorate had now awarded a two-year total of 2,455 grants and signed 25 contracts in research and development, and incentivized $8.15 billion in private capital and more than 75 exits from federal seed funding; the NSF also designated 10 new Regional Innovation Engines in January 2024, issued the first 40 awards in the ExLENT program promoting experiential learning in semiconductor engineering at universities, launched the NSF SBIR/STTR Fast-Track pilot program for certain startups and the APTO program promoting technology prediction, and signed a memorandum of understanding with the Commerce Department for further action in workforce development.

In September 2024, the National Academies of Sciences, Engineering, and Medicine produced a report on NASA's organizational efficiency mandated by the law, which found several critical weaknesses, namely, in long-term planning, workforce retention, headquarters staffing levels, budgetary support from Congress, aging infrastructure, and emphasis on research and development as part of instrument planning.

=== Project announcements ===
Many companies and ecosystem suppliers have announced investment plans since May 2020, when TSMC announced that it would build a fab in Arizona, which upon completion began producing Apple A16 chips in earnest in mid-September 2024, according to independent journalist Tim Culpan, achieving 4 percent higher production yields than the average in Taiwan by late October.

These include (before the act passed on August 9, 2022):

- In July 2021, GlobalFoundries announced plans to build a new $1 billion fab in Upstate New York.
- In November 2021, Samsung announced plans to build a $17 billion semiconductor factory to begin operations in the second half of 2024. It is the largest foreign direct investment ever in the state of Texas.
- In January 2022, Intel announced an initial $20 billion investment that will generate 3,000 jobs, the largest investment in Ohio's history, with plans to grow to $100 billion investment in eight fabrication plants.
- In May 2022, Purdue University launched the nation's first comprehensive semiconductor degrees program in anticipation of the CHIPS Act spurring the creation of jobs for 50,000 trained semiconductor engineers in the United States.
- In May 2022, Texas Instruments broke ground on new 300-mm semiconductor wafer fabrication plants in Sherman, Texas, and projected its investments will reach $30 billion and create as many as 3,000 jobs.
- In July 2022, SkyWater announced plans to build an advanced $1.8 billion semiconductor manufacturing facility with the government of Indiana and Purdue University to pursue CHIPS funding.

After the act passed:

- In September 2022, Wolfspeed announced it will build the world's largest silicon carbide semiconductor plant in Chatham County, North Carolina. By 2030, the company expects to occupy more than one million square feet of manufacturing space across 445 acres, at a cost of $1.3 billion. The first phase of development is supported by about $1 billion in incentives from state, county, and local governments, and the company intends to apply for CHIPS act money.
- In October 2022, Micron Technology announced it will invest $20 billion in a new chip factory in Clay, New York, to take advantages of the subsidies in the Act and signaled it could expand its investments to $100 billion over 20 years. The state of New York granted the company $5.5 billion in tax credits as an incentive to move there, if it meets employment promises.
- In December 2022, TSMC announced the opening of the company's second chip plant in Arizona, raising its investments in the state from $12 billion to $40 billion. At that time, company officials said that construction costs in the U.S. were four to five times those in Taiwan (due to alleged higher costs of labor, red tape, and training) and that they were having difficulty finding qualified personnel (so some U.S. hires were sent for training in Taiwan for 12–18 months), so it will cost at least 50% more to make a TSMC chip in the United States than in Taiwan. It was also reported that the project faced significant delays due to TSMC engaging in routine wage theft and not hiring unionized subcontractors to carry out pipe-fitting and other construction work properly, among other issues such as withholding necessary skills training; while in January 2024, TSMC said it had delayed the opening from 2026 to 2028 in order to evaluate the Biden administration's shifting approach to tax credits. In April 2024, multiple TSMC employees attested to the deep workplace cultural differences between Taiwanese and American engineers as a key factor in these delays. In March 2025, TSMC announced it would invest $100 billion more in the Arizona site, including more fabs and packaging facilities and a research center.
- In February 2023, Texas Instruments announced an $11 billion investment in a new 300-mm wafer fab in Lehi, Utah.
- In February 2023, Integra Technologies announced a $1.8 billion proposal for expanding their Outsourced Semiconductor Assembly and Test (OSAT) operation in Wichita, Kansas.
- In February 2023, EMP Shield announced a $1.9 billion proposal for a new campus in Burlington, Kansas.
- In April 2023, Bosch announced it was acquiring TSI Semiconductors and investing $1.5 billion in upgrades geared toward making silicon carbide chips at the TSI plant in Roseville, California.
- In June 2023, the French company Mersen, a subsidiary of Le Carbone Lorraine, announced it would spend $81 million on an expansion project in Bay City and Greenville, Michigan due to Michigan's state implementation of the CHIPS Act.

The following projects were announced after the Act's first anniversary:

- In November 2023, Amkor Technology announced they would apply for CHIPS Act funding to build a $2 billion chip packaging and testing facility in Peoria, Arizona, motivated by their work with Apple and TSMC.
- In December 2023, BAE Systems announced they had received $35 million in national security-related grants from the Act to upgrade their Nashua, New Hampshire plant.
- In January 2024, Microchip Technology announced they had received $162 million in similar grants to upgrade their Gresham, Oregon and Colorado Springs, Colorado plants.
- In February 2024, GlobalFoundries announced they had received $1.5 billion in similar grants to build a new fab in Malta, New York and upgrade their Essex Junction, Vermont plant.
- In March 2024, Intel announced they had received $8.5 billion from the Act to build four new highly advanced semiconductor fabs in Chandler, Arizona and New Albany, Ohio and upgrade plants in Hillsboro, Oregon and Rio Rancho, New Mexico.
- In April 2024, TSMC announced they had received $6.6 billion to build a third fab in Arizona, with the intent to host the 2 nm process, and construction slated to begin in 2028. The grant was finalized on November 15.
- In April 2024, Samsung announced they had received $6.4 billion in grants from the Act to invest in additional capacity at its new Texas factory site, which had been revealed to be located in Taylor, and at their existing factory in nearby Austin.
- In April 2024, Micron Technologies announced a federal CHIPS and Science Act grant of $6.1 billion toward building a new semiconductor chip manufacturing campus in Clay, New York, a northern suburb of Syracuse in Upstate New York, along with a new leading-edge fab in Boise, Idaho; it also announced it would progress its worldwide investments by $100 billion.
- In May 2024, the Biden administration and Polar Semiconductor agreed to establish a new foundry creating 160 new jobs in Bloomington, Minnesota using $120 million in CHIPS Act funding.
- In May 2024, the administration and SK Group subsidiary Absolics announced an agreement to build glass wafers in a new factory creating 1,200 new jobs in Covington, Georgia using $75 million in CHIPS Act money.
- In June 2024, the administration and Rocket Lab announced an agreement to expand production of solar cells in Albuquerque, New Mexico using $23.9 million in CHIPS Act money.
- In January 2025, the Department of Commerce announced a $325 million award under the Act to Hemlock Semiconductor to help build a new polysilicon crystal factory in Hemlock, Michigan.

On May 13, 2024, Bloomberg News found a total of $32.8 billion had been allocated from the CaSA's $39 billion fund, with federal loans and tax credits set to reach $75 billion. Boston Consulting Group and the Semiconductor Industry Association estimated that by 2033, the United States would attain 28 percent of the world's market for advanced logic chips, and its share of the world's fabs would grow to 14 percent of the total (compared to a baseline scenario of 8 percent if the Act had not passed).

=== Tech Hubs ===
On October 23, 2023, the Biden administration announced that it directed the Economic Development Administration to focus on 31 areas (across 32 states and Puerto Rico) that it designated "Tech Hubs", for the purposes of spreading development evenly around the country, and incubating advanced technology and research. The Tech Hubs' organizers competed for a total of about $500 million in implementation grants, the first such appropriation out of a budgeted $10 billion over the next five years. The Biden administration also gave out "Strategy Development Grants" to 29 consortia of businesses, labor unions and governments in areas that lost out, encouraging further organizational improvements before trying again to become a Tech Hub.

On July 2, 2024, the Biden administration announced that it would award $504 million in additional grants to 12 of the Tech Hubs to further their research. It also announced that the Tech Hub program had already attracted $4 billion in private sector investments.

=== Macroeconomic impact ===
Estimates of the results of the CHIPS Act vary. The trade group Semiconductor Industry Association, which analyzed announced investments from May 2020 to December 2022, claimed the CHIPS Act had led to more than 50 projects worth more than $200 billion that would create 44,000 jobs. By December 4, 2025, the SIA had updated its figures, saying that since 2020 the numbers had risen to more than $630 billion invested in 140 projects, creating 500,000 jobs across 28 states. By the count of policy researcher Jack Conness, the CHIPS Act led to 37 projects worth $272 billion and a predicted 36,300 jobs as of November 14, 2024; when considered together with Inflation Reduction Act investments, the total comes out to 218 projects worth $388 billion creating 135,800 jobs.

Arizona is in line for the largest individual investment (TSMC's $65 billion investment, predicted to create 6,000 jobs), the most total jobs created (above 11,000) and the most dollars overall ($97.5 billion). Counties that voted for Biden in 2020 received more dollars from the Act ($227.9 million) than counties that voted for Donald Trump ($44 million).

In December 2023, the Financial Times found the IRA and CaSA together catalyzed over $224 billion in investments and over 100,000 new jobs by the preceding July.

According to the New Democrat-linked think tank Center for American Progress, the CHIPS and Science Act, the Inflation Reduction Act, and the Infrastructure Investment and Jobs Act have together led to more than 35,000 public and private investments. The Biden administration itself claimed that as of January 10, 2025, the IIJA, CaSA, and IRA together catalyzed $1 trillion in private investment (including $449 billion in electronics and semiconductors, $184 billion in electric vehicles and batteries, $215 billion in clean power, $93 billion in clean energy tech manufacturing and infrastructure, and $51 billion in heavy industry) and over $756.2 billion in public infrastructure spending (including $99 billion in energy aside from tax credits in the IRA).

=== California ===
==== Manufacturing ====
In California, where the semiconductor industry was founded in Silicon Valley, experts say that it is very unlikely that any new manufacturing facilities will be built, due to tight regulations, high costs of land and electricity, and unreliable water supplies. These factors have contributed to the state's 33% decline in manufacturing jobs since 1990.

==== Research ====
In May 2023, Applied Materials announced it would build a new collaborative advanced research and development center (distinct from traditional fabs) named the "EPIC Center", short for "Equipment and Process Innovation and Commercialization Center", by 2026, next to its existing facility in Sunnyvale, California. The first known CHIPS Act-linked investment in Silicon Valley, the EPIC Center is worth $4 billion and is projected to create 2,000 jobs.

== Implementation ==
=== Underfunding of research agencies ===
In June 2023, after the passage of the debt-ceiling deal, Federation of American Scientists analysts Matt Hourihan and Melissa Roberts Chapman and Brookings Institution analyst Mark Muro noted that the Consolidated Appropriations Act, 2023 had underfunded three key agencies to the Science Act (the NSF, the DOE's Office of Science, and NIST) by $2.7 billion, or 12 percent compared to the Act's intent, and that the President's proposal for the 2024 United States federal budget would likely shortchange them by $5.1 billion, or 19 percent compared to the Act's intent. Upon reviewing the effects the shortfalls would bring on defense policy and the economy, they recommended that more science and technology spending be moved into the mandatory category, as had been done with some semiconductor spending.

In March 2024, Politico contributor Christine Mui cited Hourihan in detailing how the Science Act interacted with later spending deals. In the actual 2024 budget, the NSF was underfunded by 42 percent compared to the Act's authorization and by 11 percent compared to its budget request; the Department of Energy's Office of Science was underfunded by 13 percent compared to the Act's authorization, while the Economic Development Administration's regional hubs program was funded with $41 million ($541 million since 2022) against an annual authorization of $2 billion ($4 billion from 2022); NIST's budget, for which the 2023 Appropriations Act appropriated $1.564 billion and the Science Act authorized $1.562 billion, saw an 11 percent cut and NASA's budget fell 9 percent short of its request. As of April 2024, CHIPS research agencies have been underfunded by over $8 billion.

In April, Commerce Secretary Raimondo revealed the CHIPS Program Office would no longer fund commercial research and development investments via the Act's $39 billion fund, due to high demand totaling $70 billion, and said applicants must seek other sources of R&D funding.

=== National Semiconductor Technology Center ===
The Act creates a National Semiconductor Technology Center to perform advanced research and development on semiconductors. In order to implement it, the Department of Commerce created a nonprofit public–private partnership within NIST called Natcast in April 2023, putting out a call for volunteers to select the board members. In June, the selection committee was announced as Janet Foutty of Deloitte, John L. Hennessy of Alphabet, Jason Gaverick Matheny of RAND Corporation, Don Rosenberg of the University of California, San Diego, and Brenda Darden Wilkerson of AnitaB.org. In September, the selection committee's activities were closed. By the White House's announcement date, the board of trustees was finalized as Robin Abrams of Analog Devices Inc., Craig Barrett of Intel, Reggie Brothers of the MIT Lincoln Lab, Nick Donofrio of IBM, Donna Dubinsky of Palm and Handspring, and Erica Fuchs of Carnegie Mellon University. They selected Deirdre Hanford of Synopsys to serve as Natcast's CEO. As of October 24, 2024, Natcast was promised at least $5 billion from the Biden administration, and has established a Workforce Center of Excellence and "Community of Interest", beginning its first $100 million grant competition in the summer, with a focus on improving artificial intelligence and making cutting-edge research cheaper. It prepared its strategic plan for fiscal years 2025–2027, outlining goals that range from scaling up multi-process wafer access to computer-aided design of chips to organizing the Workforce Center of Excellence.

The headquarters of Natcast were in a strip mall in Portola Valley, California. States that have received huge amounts of semiconductor investments such as New York, Ohio, Arizona and Texas vied to have the headquarters relocated in them. In October, the first flagship NSTC site was announced, an extreme ultraviolet lithography research lab at the Albany Nanotech Complex in Albany, New York. The second flagship site was announced the next day as a chip design lab in Sunnyvale, California. In January 2025, the third flagship site, a lab for chip packaging, was announced as Arizona State University Research Park in Tempe.

Arrian Ebrahaimi and Jordan Schneider, writing for the Institute for Progress, recommended the NSTC be structured with more centralization, work quickly and ambitiously to address market failures and externalities in chip research, and follow the management model of the similar Belgian company IMEC.

In August 2025, the second Trump administration and Commerce Secretary Howard Lutnick moved to close Natcast and cut off most of its funding, citing alleged Biden-era cronyism. CEO Hanford disputed this assertion in a letter to Natcast's members; layoffs began the next month. Dubinsky, writing for the IFP, suggested that if Congress had passed more explicit enabling legislation, allowed Biden-era trustees to stay longer, and allowed the Commerce Department more power relative to the DoD, DOE and NSF in shaping strategy, Natcast might have survived an additional nine months.

=== Metrology, packaging and digital twins initiatives ===
The Biden administration also invested at least $200 million in a new Manufacturing USA Institute under the Act, focused on spreading the use of digital twins in semiconductor design, and $300 million in the NIST Advanced Packaging Manufacturing Program, focused on researching new substrate chemistries for semiconductor packaging. The Commerce Department also awarded $100 million to 29 research projects in advanced metrology by February, and released a new notice of opportunity for metrology research funding on April 16.

=== Rule on business deals with countries of concern ===
In September 2023, the Commerce Department finalized its rule prohibiting Act funding recipients from expanding their manufacturing presence by more than 5 percent for advanced and 10 percent for mid-market chips through deals worth $100,000 or more, and brokering licensing agreements for technology transfers in China and other "countries of concern", as well as setting out how the Secretary would be notified of violations.

=== Stock buybacks and economic equality ===
In October 2022, Senators Elizabeth Warren and Tammy Baldwin and Representatives Sean Casten, Jamaal Bowman, Pramila Jayapal and Bill Foster sent a letter to Secretary Raimondo urging her to detail how the Commerce Department would enforce the law's provisions preventing companies from using CHIPS Act money directly on stock buybacks (they noted the law does not prevent recipients from using the money to free up their own funds for stock buybacks), as well as whether the department would claw back misused funds and resolve conflicts of interest. On February 10, 2023, they and Senators Bernie Sanders and Ed Markey repeated many of the same points to Michael Schmidt, head of the Department's CHIPS Program Office, and urged even stronger action, outlining what regulatory crackdowns the law authorizes the department to do.

In January 2024, Warren and Jayapal wrote to Secretary Raimondo, Schmidt, and CHIPS Program Office investment head Todd Fisher expressing their concerns over who was staffing the main funds allocator, which reporting from The Wall Street Journal and Bloomberg News the previous summer and fall had found to be a small collection of elite bankers, consultants and lobbyists from Wall Street firms with potential conflicts of interest.

At the time BAE Systems was announced to be receiving a CHIPS Act grant, Warren and Casten wrote to CEO Tom Arsenault that they wanted BAE Systems to conform with the spirit of the Act, noting that BAE had engaged in $9.4 billion in stock buybacks the previous year. Journalist Les Leopold later cited the letter and Senator Chris Van Hollen's statements to denounce Intel's engagement in similar practices netting them nearly $153 billion since 1990 and their recent mass layoffs, following the $8.5 billion grant receipt announcement.

=== Grant delays ===
As of January 2024 only two small grants had been awarded, neither for production of the most advanced chips.

One hurdle delaying the release of award monies is the National Environmental Policy Act, which requires that projects receive federal approvals before any funds can be dispersed. A federal government analysis cited by The Wall Street Journal found that these approvals, from 2013 to 2018, have taken an average of 4.5 years to receive.

In April 2024, Commerce Secretary Gina Raimondo told CNBC at Samsung's grant announcement on the Taylor fab site that she expected all CHIPS Act grant money to be awarded by the end of the year, with most of the remaining funding going to equipment suppliers, wafer makers, and chemical engineering firms. However, by mid-November 2024, only Polar Semiconductor and TSMC's grant deals had been finalized by the Biden administration. This changed by the end of the month, as the Biden administration finalized its fifth and sixth grant agreements, with GlobalFoundries for its New York and Vermont projects, and with Intel for its Arizona, New Mexico, Ohio, and Oregon projects.

=== Shortage of skilled workers ===
The US lacks the workforce required for fulfilling fab projects, with one study estimating a need of 300,000 additional skilled workers just to complete ongoing fab projects, not including new projects. Comparatively, the number of US students pursuing relevant degrees has been stagnant for 30 years, while international students face difficulties in staying to work. Plants planned by both TSMC and Intel have reportedly been struggling to find qualified workers. Even after completion, in the operational/manufacturing stage, 40% of the permanent new workers will need two-year technician degrees and 60% will need four-year engineering degrees or higher.

In Arizona, local unions clashed with TSMC after it reported that fab construction in Arizona was running behind schedule due to "an insufficient amount of skilled workers" with the expertise needed to install specialized equipment. TSMC planned to send experienced Taiwanese technicians to train local workers, which local unions characterized as "a lack of respect for American workers". The Arizona Building and Construction Trades Council subsequently asked Congress to block visas for 500 Taiwanese workers. TSMC reported that due to issues with labor, its investment in the first Arizona fab is expected to be delayed into 2025, with the second fab delayed from 2026 to 2027. (A third fab intended for hosting the 2 nm process would be announced in April 2024, though construction would not start until 2028.) In contrast, in February 2024 TSMC completed construction of its first fab in Japan, located in the Kumamoto region, in 20 months, by running 24-hour shifts, helped by the Japanese government and locals being welcoming to the influx of skilled Taiwanese workers needed for the project.

Intel similarly experienced delays from labor issues, with its planned Ohio fab expected to be delayed into 2026 due to a lack of skilled workers, as well as delays in grant funding.

=== Labor relations results ===
On December 6, 2023, the Arizona Building Trades Council and TSMC announced a deal to ensure a union-run workforce development program, improvements to transparency, and increased communications with the company's Taiwanese management, would proceed at the Arizona site.

In August 2024, the Prospect reported on several effects of the CaSA on unionization, neutrality on which the CaSA does not require of grant recipients; more specifically, it covered Secretary Raimondo's lack of enforcement of the Commerce Department's Good Jobs Principles. Workers at an Analog Devices, Inc. fab in Beaverton, Oregon protested unsafe working conditions the previous June, and are lobbying Oregon state legislators to add unionization neutrality provisions to their state-level version of the Act. Microchip Technology Vice President Dan Malinaric was recorded in July as pressuring workers to not form a union, a violation of the Wagner Act. The Communications Workers of America union was only able to reach community benefits agreements with a select few firms benefiting from the Act, including Akash Systems.

=== Secure enclave issue ===
In March 2024, Bloomberg News reported that Intel was poised to receive $3.5 billion from the CaSA in the year's federal budget (specifically the second 'minibus') as part of a "secure enclave" program which Intel claimed would help facilitate national security through carrying out United States Department of Defense contracts with high levels of secrecy. Citing interviews of Charles Wessner of the Center for Strategic and International Studies and key congressional aides, and a risk assessment report from the United States Department of the Air Force, Austin Ahlman of the antitrust think tank Open Markets Institute criticized the plan, not least because it would take up more than 10 percent of the $39 billion in grants the Act designates for domestic semiconductors, as well as increase concentration in the domestic semiconductor industry. GlobalFoundries executives also criticized the plan. The DoD later withdrew its $2.5 billion contribution to the secure enclave plan and gave it to the Commerce Department, which allowed Intel to finalize the funding agreement on September 16, 2024, amid concerns of its shaky financial performance and lagging customer outreach. The funding agreement resulted in a reduction of Intel's later grant from an announced $8.5 billion to $7.86 billion in November.

== International collaboration and geopolitical context ==
=== State Department funds ===
The State Department has awarded $200 million in partnerships to academia and foreign companies as of July 2024 under the Act's International Technology Security and Innovation Fund. The State Department has partnered with the governments of Costa Rica, Panama, Vietnam, Indonesia, the Philippines and Mexico to distribute these funds, for technology incubation purposes.

=== India-US defense fab partnership ===
In order to manufacture chips for national security needs, the US military has partnered with Indian startups to establish a semiconductor fabrication plant in India. With assistance from the India Semiconductor Mission and a strategic technology cooperation between the United States Space Force (USSF), Bharat Semi, and 3rdiTech, the fabrication plant would produce silicon carbide, infrared, and gallium nitride chips. The plant will prioritize supplying the high-voltage power electronics, advanced communications, and advanced sensors that are the three fundamental foundations of modern warfare. The chips will also be utilized in data centers, communications infrastructure, green energy systems, and railroads. It will support the development of a reliable and robust supply chain in the crucial area of national security.

The two-way cooperation is part of the CHIPS and Science Act and United States–India Initiative on Critical and Emerging Technology. In order to design and develop military-grade semiconductor for night vision devices, missile guidance, space sensors, drones, fighter aircraft, electric vehicles, military communications, radars, and jammers, the collaboration involves setting up design hubs, testing centers, centers of excellence, and two fabrication units. The project will receive a 50% capital expenditure subsidy from the India Semiconductor Mission.

To address the defense demands of the United States and its allies, the Shakti Semiconductor Fab will acquire complete expertise in the development of compound semiconductors. The factory will begin phase one production in 2027, with an annual target of 50,000 units. The establishment of the facility would cost $500 million in investments. General Atomics is 3rdiTech's technology validation partner. The company has worked under the DoD and the Ministry of Defence in the United Kingdom.

Designed for national security, the fabrication plant is the first multi-material fabrication facility in the world. On September 21, 2024, at a bilateral meeting between President Joe Biden and Prime Minister Narendra Modi in Delaware, the blueprint for the Bharat Semi Fab was revealed. The strategic significance of this project is further enhanced by the fact that it represents the US Space Force's first-ever international technology partnership.

=== Chip 4 Alliance ===
The United States, under the Biden administration, proposed a joint multilateral framework referred to as the “Chip 4 Alliance”, after semiconductor supply-chain vulnerabilities were revealed during the COVID-19 pandemic. Led by the United States, the initiative's purpose was to establish a coalition between Taiwan, South Korea, and Japan; such a coalition was seen as complementary to the CHIPS and Science Act by the Center for Strategic and International Studies. Following the announcement, participating governments held several rounds of consultations beginning with an initial session in September 2022 focused on enhancing semiconductor supply chain stability.

In February 2023, senior officials continued alliance discussions in a video conference format, reiterating the importance of resilient supply chains while also considering additional avenues for future multilateral cooperation among alliance members.

Including semiconductor production by the United States, the Chip 4 alliance accounts for an estimated 82 percent of all global semiconductor production. During the February alliance meeting, South Korea and Taiwan's assigned roles were to focus on semiconductor production, while Japan was to prioritize the acquisition and production of semiconductor materials. Taiwan's semiconductor industry, led by TSMC, plays a central role in global chip production. TSMC alone accounted for 54 percent of worldwide foundry revenue in 2020 and is one of the primary manufacturers of the world's most advanced 5 nanometer semiconductors. South Korea is a leading producer of memory semiconductors; Samsung Electronics and SK Hynix are collectively responsible for 73 percent of the global DRAM market share and 51 percent of the NAND flash market. Japan maintains a key upstream role in the supply chain, supplying over 35 percent of semiconductor manufacturing equipment and approximately half of the world's semiconductor material supply.

In October 2022, the U.S. Department of Commerce's Bureau of Industry and Security imposed export restrictions on the People's Republic of China preventing the purchase or manufacturing of high-end chips used in military applications. Additionally, U.S. professionals were barred from aiding in the development of integrated circuits for Chinese firms without a license. In 2023, Japan and the Netherlands introduced comparable restrictions on advanced semiconductor equipment, aligning their policies with the U.S. framework. Although neither Japan nor the Netherlands formally identified China as a target of the export controls, Chinese foreign ministry spokesperson, Mao Ning, threatened to retaliate against both countries. Chip 4 meetings have been characterized by experts as additional opportunities for participating governments to exchange views on semiconductor-related regulatory issues and to advance the long-term goal of diversifying supply chains away from China.

An estimated 35 to 40 percent of Samsung Electronics’ NAND flash and 40 percent of SK Hynix's DRAM is manufactured in Chinese facilities. In addition, approximately 70 percent of South Korea's memory-chip exports were exported to China, while over 75 percent of its semiconductor raw materials imports were sourced from China. Analysts have noted that this level of economic dependence has complicated South Korea's participation in the Chip 4 alliance's coordinated export-control discussions. China remains Taiwan's largest trading partner in commodities including integrated circuits, leading senior Taiwanese officials to acknowledge that a complete severance of the countries' interconnected technology sectors remains challenging, further complicating the formalization of the Chip 4 alliance; commentator Zoe Weaver said the Act's International Technology Security and Innovation Fund could be one source of funds to help defray these complications.

== Follow-up environmental bill ==
On July 11, 2023, after complaints from semiconductor lobbyists on CHIPS Act-related permitting issues, Senators Mark Kelly, Sherrod Brown, Todd Young, Ted Cruz, and Bill Hagerty introduced the Building Chips in America Act, which would designate the Commerce Department the lead agency for major fab projects, limit the scope of NEPA reviews for certain fab projects, and cut judicial review times for them. The Senate passed the bill once on July 28, 2023 and again in December 2023. The House passed the companion bill on September 23, 2024, with a vote of 275–125. Amid protests from Representative Zoe Lofgren, the Sierra Club, Center for Biological Diversity, CHIPS Communities United, and two dozen other environmental groups, President Biden signed the bill into law on October 2.

== Subsequent developments ==
During Donald Trump's 2025 speech to a joint session of Congress, the president asked House Speaker Mike Johnson to "get rid" of the subject act. However, as of October 2025 the Trump administration has instead preserved the Act, even adding an additional 10 percentage points to the advanced semiconductor manufacturing tax credit.

In August 2025, the U.S. government acquired a 9.9% stake in Intel at a share price of $20.47 paid for with $11.1 billion in grants from the Act. That same month, the Trump administration and Commerce Secretary Howard Lutnick moved to close Natcast, the nonprofit semiconductor research entity, denying it $7.4 billion in funding for what Lutnick claimed to be Biden-allied cronyism after months of suppressing its research agenda.

Per Dubinsky, "the Industrial Advisory Committee has been disbanded, the National Advanced Packaging Manufacturing Program is not active, the new semiconductor-focused Manufacturing USA Institute has been discontinued, and the Consortium Steering Committee has not met since the change of administration."

In November 2025, the Institute for Progress launched a Substack newsletter, Factory Settings, written by three former CHIPS Program Office staffers Mike Schmidt, Sara Meyers and Todd Fisher, detailing their experiences implementing the Act and criticizing many of its procedural obstacles.

=== Quantum computing ===
In May 2026, the Trump administration announced that nine major quantum computing firms would receive $2 billion in CHIPS Act grants. In return, the government will take varying equity stakes in each of the companies. IBM will receive half the award, putting it toward a new IBM subsidiary called Anderon. Venture capital-backed startups such as Quantinuum, PsiQuantum, and Atom Computing each received $100 million; Diraq received $38 million.

== See also ==
- America COMPETES Act of 2022 – original House version
- European Chips Act
- Infrastructure Investment and Jobs Act and Inflation Reduction Act of 2022 – other major acts in industrial policy signed by Biden
- Technology policy
- Technology education
- Techno-nationalism
- Pax Silica – Trump-era multilateral initiative to secure critical minerals
- United States Innovation and Competition Act – original Senate version
- Artificial Intelligence Cold War
- National Artificial Intelligence Initiative Act of 2020
- List of semiconductor companies in the United States
- List of semiconductor occupations
