= Blue Origin Federation, LLC v. United States =

2021 U.S. court case

- Court: United States Court of Federal Claims
- Full case name: Blue Origin LLC v. United States of America & Space Exploration Technologies Corporation
- Decided: 4 November 2021

Case opinions
- Complaint from Blue Origin is dismissed, NASA is allowed to award SpaceX for developing Starship HLS

On 13 August 2021, Blue Origin filed a complaint to the United States Court of Federal Claims about NASA's award of $2.9 billion to SpaceX. The award was used by the company to develop Starship HLS, a lunar lander that NASA selected for the Artemis program. On 4 November 2021, the Court of Federal Claims dismissed the complaint, and the accompanying memorandum opinion was titled Blue Origin v. United States & Space Exploration Technologies Corp. Blue Origin's complaint and prior actions have received attention from the news media and spaceflight industries.

== Background ==
In December 2018, NASA announced that it was seeking proposals for lunar landing systems under the Artemis program, which it released under Appendix E of its NeXTSTEP-2 program. Project funding of $3.3 billion was requested but by the time an omnibus appropriations bill was passed in December 2020, only $850 million was available.

== Government Accountability Office ==
On 26 April 2021, Blue Origin and Dynetics both filed formal protests with the US Government Accountability Office claiming that NASA had improperly evaluated aspects of the proposals. On 30 April 2021, NASA suspended the Starship HLS contract and funding until such time as the GAO could issue a ruling on the protests. In May 2021, Sen. Cantwell, from Blue Origin's state of Washington, introduced an amendment to the "Endless Frontier Act" that directed NASA to reopen the HLS competition and select a second lander proposal, authorized spending of an additional US$10 billion. This funding would require a separate appropriations act. Sen. Sanders criticized the amendment as a "multibillion dollar Bezos bailout", as the money would likely go to Blue Origin, which was founded by Jeff Bezos. The act, including this amendment, was passed by the Senate on 8 June 2021.

On 30 July 2021, the GAO rejected the protests and found that "NASA did not violate procurement law" in awarding the contract to SpaceX, who bid a much lower cost and more capable system. NASA made the contracted initial payment of US$300M to SpaceX the same day.

CNBC reported on 4 August that "Jeff Bezos' space company remains on the offensive in criticizing NASA's decision to award Elon Musk's SpaceX with the sole contract to build a vehicle to land astronauts on the moon" and that the company had produced an infographic promoting Blue Origin's design over SpaceX's design while leaving out the difference in contract bid prices.

== Filing ==
On 13 August 2021, Blue Origin filed a lawsuit in the US Court of Federal Claims challenging "NASA's unlawful and improper evaluation of proposals". Blue Origin asked the court for an injunction to halt further spending by NASA on the existing contract with SpaceX. Reaction to the lawsuit was mostly negative in the space community, at NASA, and among Blue Origin employees according to space journalist Eric Berger. The judge dismissed the suit on 4 November 2021 and NASA was allowed to resume working with SpaceX.

== Outcome ==
According to a filing in the Court of Federal Claims dated November 4, 2021, the case was dismissed. The decision was made after the facts of the case were considered by the Court of Federal Claims. The presiding judge was Richard A. Hertling. The court's finding provided in the document clarified that Blue Origin failed to establish foul play by NASA. Therefore, Blue Origin failed on merits, and its complaint was dismissed.

NASA Office of Inspector General stated that Blue Origin and Dynetics's bid protests had caused a 4-month delay in the program. About two years later in May 2023 NASA awarded Blue Origin a $3.4 billion contract to develop a competing Moon lander, compared to the $2.89 billion of the original bid that lead to the lawsuit. NASA noted that "adding another human landing system partner to NASA’s Artemis program will increase competition, reduce costs to taxpayers, support a regular cadence of lunar landings, further invest in the lunar economy, and help NASA achieve its goals on and around the Moon in preparation for future astronaut missions to Mars."

== Prominence ==
According to Eric Berger from Ars Technica many in the space community, including some of Blue Origin's employees, reacted negatively to the company's complaint and related actions.

== See also ==
- Artemis HLS development history
- Billionaire space race § SpaceX vs. Blue Origin
- Lunar Gateway
