= Bioeconomy Research and Development Act =

2021 bill in the US Congress

The Bioeconomy Research and Development Act was a bill introduced in the U.S. Congress in 2021.

== Overview ==
The bill aims to establish an initiative through the Office of Science and Technology Policy to promote research and development in biomanufacturing, build a future bioeconomy workforce, and address ethical, legal, environmental, safety, security, and societal concerns. It also directs the National Academies of Sciences, Engineering, and Medicine to review these issues in the context of engineering biology and assigns OSTP to lead an interagency coordination committee, outlining the roles of participating agencies.

== Legislative activity ==
Senator Ed Markey introduced S. 1418 on April 28, 2021. A companion bill, H.R. 4521, was introduced in the House of Representatives by Representative Eddie Bernice Johnson.

Elements of the bill were included in the CHIPS and Science Act, which passed into law in 2022.
