= The Space Barons =

2018 book about space companies

The Space Barons: Elon Musk, Jeff Bezos, and the Quest to Colonize the Cosmos
- Author: Christian Davenport
- Language: English
- Genre: Non-fiction
- Publisher: PublicAffairs
- Publication date: March 20, 2018
- Publication place: United States
- Pages: 336
- ISBN: 978-1-61039-829-9

The Space Barons: Elon Musk, Jeff Bezos, and the Quest to Colonize the Cosmos is a 2018 book by Christian Davenport. It covers the rise of the commercial space companies Blue Origin, led by Amazon founder Jeff Bezos, and SpaceX, led by PayPal and Tesla Motors founder Elon Musk.

== See also ==
- Billionaire space race
