= America COMPETES Act =

American act to provide research and development

The America COMPETES Act (formally America Creating Opportunities to Meaningfully Promote Excellence in Technology, Education, and Science Act of 2007) was authored by Bart Gordon and signed into law on August 9, 2007, by President George W. Bush. The act aimed to invest in innovation through research and development and improve the competitiveness of the United States.

On May 29, 2010, the U.S. House passed a measure to reauthorize the America COMPETES Act. On July 22, 2010, the U.S. Senate Committee on Commerce, Science, and Transportation approved the America COMPETES Reauthorization Act of 2010 and sent it to the U.S. Senate for a vote. On January 4, 2011, President Barack Obama signed the America COMPETES Reauthorization Act of 2010 into law.

On February 4, 2022, the House passed the America COMPETES Act of 2022, followed by the Senate on March 28, 2022.

== America COMPETES Act of 2007 ==
America COMPETES Act

United States Congress
- Long title: An Act to invest in innovation through research and development, and to improve the competitiveness of the United States
- Citation: 121 Stat. 572
- Enacted: August 9, 2007
- Bill citation: Pub. L. 110–69 (text) (PDF)

The provisions of The America COMPETES Act of 2007 covered a wide range of activities of a number of federal agencies and offices, including:

- Office of Science and Technology Policy (Title I)
- National Aeronautics and Space Administration (Title II)
- National Institute of Standards and Technology (Title III)
- National Oceanic and Atmospheric Administration (NOAA; Title IV)
- Department of Energy (Title V)
- National Science Foundation (Title VII)

In many places, the Act mandates that each agency cooperate with its partner agencies and offices, calling attention to the importance of high-risk, high-reward research in areas of national importance. The American COMPETES Act of 2007 also appropriated funds to the Department of Commerce.

=== General provisions ===
The America COMPETES Act of 2007 created the President's Council on Innovation and Competitiveness. The council was never formed. Instead, the President's Council of Advisors on Science and Technology (PCAST) was formed in 2010 by President Barack Obama to serve in its place.

It called for a National Science and Technology Summit; numerous reports on the state of innovation and competitiveness in the United States; and assessments of each unit's effective support of the Act's science, technology, engineering, and mathematics (STEM) education agenda. In several places, it called for the enhancement of research capabilities and coordination and emphasized the importance of undergraduate research experiences as tools that promote careers in STEM fields.

The act also set baselines for targeted funding appropriations. The act aimed to double the annual appropriations for the National Science Foundation by the year 2011.

=== Education provisions ===
The act addressed efforts each agency makes in the area of educating future STEM wage workers. In addition, the act addressed education and, placing it at the same level of prominence in the act as the federal agencies.

Title VI, Subtitle A is titled "Teacher Assistance" and is divided into parts, each of which addresses separate provisions:

- Part I: Teachers for a Competitive Tomorrow aimed to develop and implement programs to increase the production of professionals with both a baccalaureate degree in STEM and critical foreign languages and teaching certification; to develop 2–3 year part-time masters programs in teaching; and to develop professional science master's degree programs.
- Part II: Advanced Placement and International Baccalaureate Programs aimed to raise the achievement of secondary students through AP and IB programs by increasing the number of qualified teachers; increasing the success rate of students from high-need schools in AP and IB programs; and increasing availability of and enrollment in pre-AP, pre-IB, AP, and IB courses in high-need schools.
- Part III: Promising Practices in STEM Teaching established a panel of experts to provide information on promising practices for strengthening teaching and learning in STEM at the elementary school and secondary school levels.

Title VI, Subtitle B of the act, titled Mathematics, aimed to enable all elementary and middle school students to reach or exceed grade-level academic achievement standards and to prepare the students to enroll in and pass algebra; to provide summer term programs in mathematics, technology, and problem-solving; and to provide targeted support for low-income and special needs middle school students and their teachers. Subtitle C of the act is titled Foreign Language Partnership Program. It aimed to increase opportunities to study critical foreign languages. Subtitle D of the act is called Alignment of Education Programs, and it aimed to coordinate learning outcomes and assessments across state and federal stakeholders. Subtitle D of the act called Mathematics and Science Partnership Bonus Grants, sets awards for high-need schools in each state which show the greatest improvement on assessments in mathematics and science.

=== Provisions for the National Science Foundation ===
The National Science Foundation's (NSF) FY2008 appropriation was set at $6.6 billion by the act, and $8.132 billion in FY2010. The act mandated new proposal requirements such as a mentoring plan for all postdoctoral positions, that institutions receiving funding have plans to provide training on the responsible conduct of research, and the sharing of final project reports. The act also mandated that the NSF commission a report from the National Academies of Sciences about barriers to increasing the number of underrepresented minorities in STEM fields.

In Sec. 6002, the act made specific provisions on the appropriation of funds for the following NSF programs for FY2008–2010:

- Major Research Instrumentation program
- Faculty Early Career Development (CAREER) Program
- Research Experiences for Undergraduates program
- Experimental Program to Stimulate Competitive Research
- Integrative Graduate Education and Research Traineeship program
- Mathematics and Science Education Partnerships
- NSF Graduate Research Fellowship Program
- Robert Noyce Scholarship Program
- Science, Mathematics, Engineering, and Technology Talent Expansion Program
- Advanced Technological Education program

== America COMPETES Act of 2010 ==
America COMPETES Reauthorization Act of 2010

United States Congress
- Long title: An Act to invest in innovation through research and development, to improve the competitiveness of the United States, and for other purposes.
- Citation: 124 Stat. 3982
- Enacted: January 4, 2011
- Bill citation: Pub. L. 111–358 (text) (PDF)

The House reauthorized the act on May 28, 2010, by a vote of 262–150. On December 17, 2010, the Senate passed an amended version of H.R. 5116 by unanimous consent. Then, on December 22, the House voted 228–130 to pass the Senate's version and allow it to become law.

Reauthorization of America COMPETES Act provided increased funding, expanding the authorization of committees involved in STEM and business fields, and established an undersecretary position. There are two authorization acts: one for the National Institute of Standards and Technology (NIST), an agency of the Department of Commerce, and one for the National Science Foundation. The act laid out several studies to be completed and establishes a new office in the Department of Commerce. The act mainly affected the Department of Commerce, Department of Energy, National Science Foundation, and the White House.

The act requires the White House's Office of Science and Technology Policy to establish a committee to coordinate federal programs and activities in support of STEM education. The committee was to include representatives of the National Science Foundation, Department of Energy, NASA, NOAA, Department of Education, OMB, and other agencies. Sec 102 of Title I established the Committee on Technology under the National Science and Technology Council to coordinate federal agencies with advanced manufacturing research and development progress.

=== Grants and fellowships ===
Several merit-based partnerships between the federal government and higher education institutions or businesses were extended or created under COMPETES.

==== Manufacturing education ====
In order to help ensure a well-trained manufacturing workforce, the director will award grants to strengthen and expand scientific and technical education and training in advanced manufacturing, including through the Foundation's Advanced Technological Education program.

Merit-based grants and funding were made available to higher education institutions that promote innovation and increase the impact of research by developing tools and resources to connect new scientific discoveries to practical uses. Also, merit-based grants are made available to support research into green and sustainable chemistry which will lead to clean, safe, and economical alternatives to traditional chemical products and practices.

Title V also continues the support of the Louis Stokes Alliance for Minority Participation Program, which permits specialized STEM high schools conducting research to participate in major data collection initiatives. It also provides merit-based grants for institutions providing STEM education research and internship opportunities for undergraduates.

==== STEM Training grant program ====
The STEM Training grant program is designed to recruit and prepare students who pursue a STEM baccalaureate degree to become certified as elementary and secondary teachers. The program requires its trainees to complete a final evaluation of their teaching proficiency based on their classroom teaching performance and a portfolio of their accomplishments. The program awards grants annually on a competitive basis to institutions of higher education in the amount of $2,000,000 per institution.

=== National Aeronautics and Space Administration ===
Under Title II, NASA must carry out education programs that are designed to increase student interest and participation in STEM, improve literacy in STEM, and provide curriculum support and materials. NASA must also conduct an assessment of the impediments to the space science workforce for minority and underrepresented groups.

=== National Oceanic and Atmospheric Administration ===
The act directed NOAA to identify emerging and innovative research and development priorities to enhance the United States' competitiveness. The act also aimed for NOAA to promote United States leadership in oceanic and atmospheric science and competitiveness in the applied uses of such knowledge. The act also directed NOAA to collaborate with other relevant federal agencies, academic institutions, the private sector, and nongovernmental programs. Under the act, NOAA must also continue to carry out and support research-based programs and activities designed to increase student interest and participation in STEM and improve public literacy in STEM.

=== National Institute of Standards and Technology ===
Referred to as the National Institute of Standards and Technology Authorization Act of 2010, it authorizes an appropriations to the Secretary of Commerce for the NIST.

Funds authorized to be appropriated to the Secretary of Commerce for the NIST
| FY | Total | Scientific and technical research | Construction and maintenance | Industrial technology services | | Malcolm Baldrige National Quality Award |
| FY | Total | Scientific and technical research | Construction and maintenance | Manufacturing Extension Partnership | Total | Malcolm Baldrige National Quality Award |
|---|---|---|---|---|---|---|
| 2011 | $918.9 million | $584.5 million | $124.8 million | $141.1 million | $209.6 million | $10 million |
| 2012 | $970.8 million | $661.1 million | $84.9 million | $155.1 million | $224.8 million | $10.3 million |
| 2013 | $1.04 billion | $676.7 million | $121.3 million | $165.1 million | $241.7 million | $10.6 million |

Section 403 of Title IV established the Under Secretary of Commerce for Standards and Technology. Section 405 established a research initiative to support the development of emergency communication and tracking technologies for use in locating trapped individuals in confined spaces where conventional radio communication is limited. Section 408 states the Director will carry out a green manufacturing and construction initiative to develop accurate sustainability metrics and advanced standards for use in manufacturing.

=== National Science Foundation ===
Funds authorized to be appropriated to the National Science Foundation
| FY | Total | Research and related activities | Education and human resources | Major research equipment and facilities construction | Agency operations and award management | Office of the National Science Board | Office of the Inspector General |
|---|---|---|---|---|---|---|---|
| 2011 | $7.42 billion | $5.97 billion | $937.9 million | $164.7 million | $327.5 million | $4.8 million | $14.7 million |
| 2012 | $7.80 billion | $6.23 billion | $979.0 million | $225.5 million | $341.7 million | $4.8 million | $14.7 million |
| 2013 | $8.30 billion | $6.64 billion | $1.04 billion | $236.8 million | $363.7 million | $4.9 million | $15.0 million |

=== Innovation ===
Through the COMPETES Act, the Secretary of Commerce established an Office of Innovation and Entrepreneurship to foster innovation and the commercialization of new technologies, products, processes, and services to promote productivity and economic growth in the United States. The Office of Innovation and Entrepreneurship is responsible for developing policies to advance the commercialization of research and development, including federally funded research and development. Additionally, the secretary shall establish a program to provide loan guarantees for obligations to small- or medium-sized manufacturers for the use or production of innovative technologies.

Under the COMPETES Act, the federal government encourages and supports the development of regional innovation strategies, including regional innovation clusters and science and research parks. Grants awarded under this subsection may be used for activities determined appropriate by the Secretary of Commerce. The maximum amount of loan principal guaranteed under this subsection may not exceed $50 million for a single project and $300 million for all projects.

==== United States innovation and competitive capacity ====
Section 604 of the COMPETES Act required a study on the competitive and innovative capacity of the United States. The Economic and Statistics Administration in the Department of Commerce completed the report. The report included an analysis of the United States economy and innovation infrastructure. The report also assessed various matters, including the United States' economic competitiveness, various impacts on economic competitiveness, export policies and programs, the effectiveness of federally-funded research and development centers in supporting and promoting technology commercialization, domestic and international intellectual property policies and practices, US manufacturing capacity and supply chain dynamics of major export sectors, and policies related to STEM and the promotion of commercial innovation. The report developed recommendations on how the US should invest in human capital, how the US should facilitate entrepreneurship and innovation, how to develop opportunities for local and regional innovation through federal support, how to strengthen the economic infrastructure of the US, and how to improve the international competitiveness of the US.

The report was released on January 6, 2012, by Secretary of Commerce John Bryson. The report outlined the major accomplishments of the American model and offered brief recommendations for ensuring future success. The COMPETES report advocated for increased federal support for basic research, the redoing of the American education system, and the reallocation of wireless spectrum.

==== Innovation Advisory Board ====
The innovation advisory board was a fifteen-member group of business and nonprofit leaders in the fields of science, technology and innovation: Robert Atkinson, Rebecca Bagley, Jim Clements, Abby Joseph Cohen, Larry Cohen, Judy Estrin, Rebecca Henderson, Irwin Jacobs, Arthur Levinson, James Manyika, Natalia Olson-Urtecho, Kim Polese, Lucy Sanders, Julie Shimer, and Stephen Tang.

=== Department of Energy ===
The COMPETES 2010 reauthorization increased funding for STEM education programs, the Nuclear Science Talent Program, Hydrocarbon Systems Talent Program, Protecting America's Competitive Edge (PACE) Graduate Student Fellowship, Distinguished Scientist Program, and the Advanced Research Project Agency–Energy (ARPA-E).

== America COMPETES Act of 2022 ==
America COMPETES Act of 2022

Legislative history
- Introduced in the House as H.R. 4521 by Eddie Bernice Johnson (D–TX) on July 19, 2021; Committee consideration by House Science, Space, and Technology, House Agriculture, and House Energy and Commerce; Passed the House on February 4, 2022 (222-210); Passed the Senate on March 28, 2022 (68-28)

On January 25, 2022, The House Committee on Science, Space, and Technology, voted to advance H.R. 4521 America COMPETES Act of 2022. The bill has bipartisan support and is primarily focused on encouraging and strengthening American scientific and technological innovation, research, and development. The bill passed the House on February 4, 2022. The Senate passed an amended bill by substituting the text of H.R. 4521 for the text of the U.S. Innovation and Competition Act on March 28, 2022. The differences between the House and Senate bills were worked out in a congressional conference committee. It was signed into law by President Joe Biden as the CHIPS and Science Act, with CHIPS standing for Creating Helpful Incentives to Produce Semiconductors.

=== Provisions ===
Main provisions include:

- CHIPS for America Fund
  - Provides $76 billion in support of US fabrication of semiconductors
- $45 billion authorized to improve the US supply chain
- $2 billion to support critical components in the production of many automobiles, consumer electronics, and defense systems

==== Removed provisions ====
- Provision to lift the cap on green cards for people who have been in the queue for more than two years, if they paid a fee.

=== Lacey Act revisions ===
In addition to aspects related to semiconductors, the America COMPETES Act of 2022 contains a rider revising the Lacey Act. If adopted, this bill would create a whitelist of animal species that would be legal to import into the United States. Additionally, the bill expands the authority of the US Fish and Wildlife Service and will limit interstate transit of any species not included in the whitelist.

== See also ==
- DARPA prize competitions
