= Billionaire space race =

Billionaire space rivalry

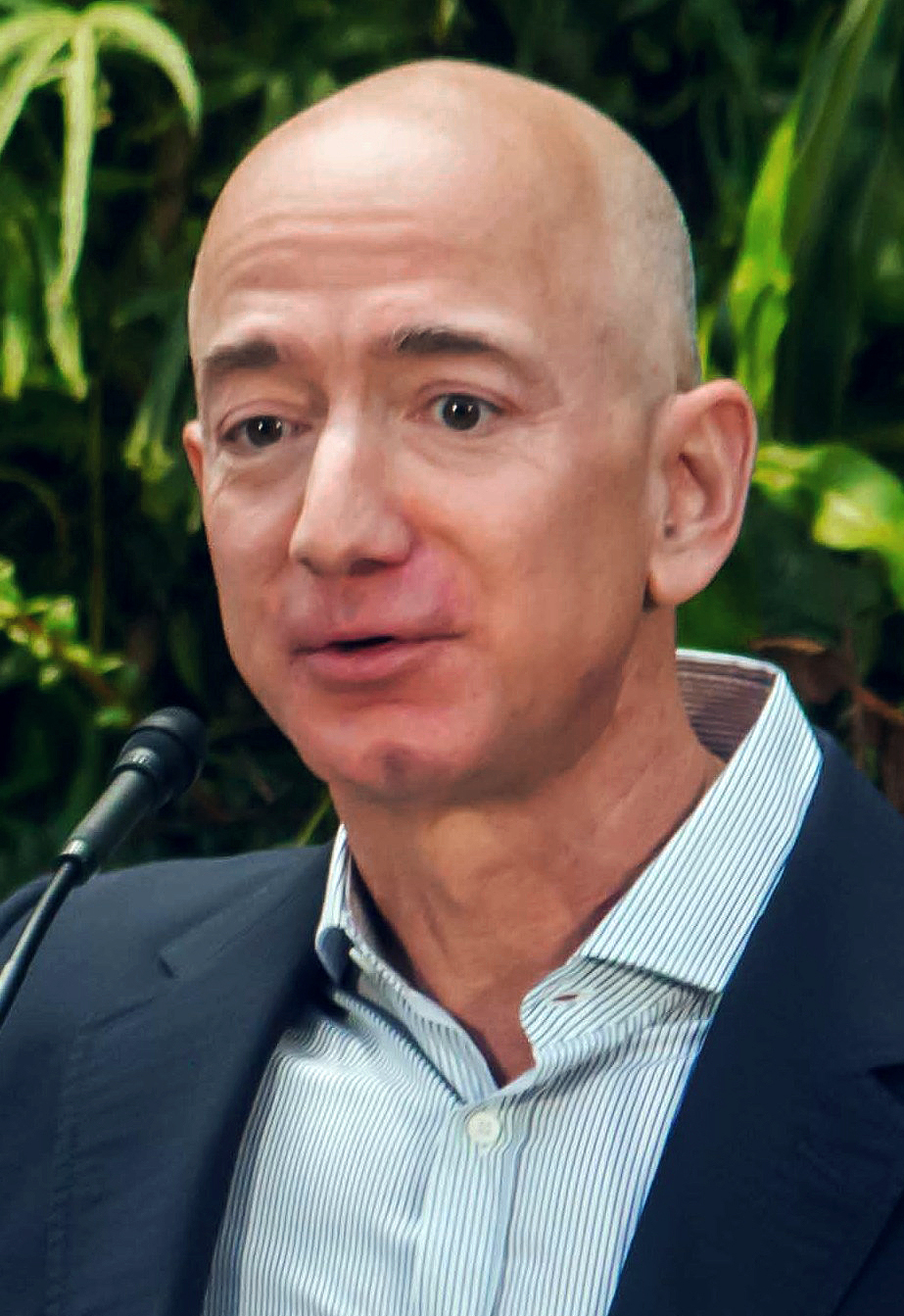
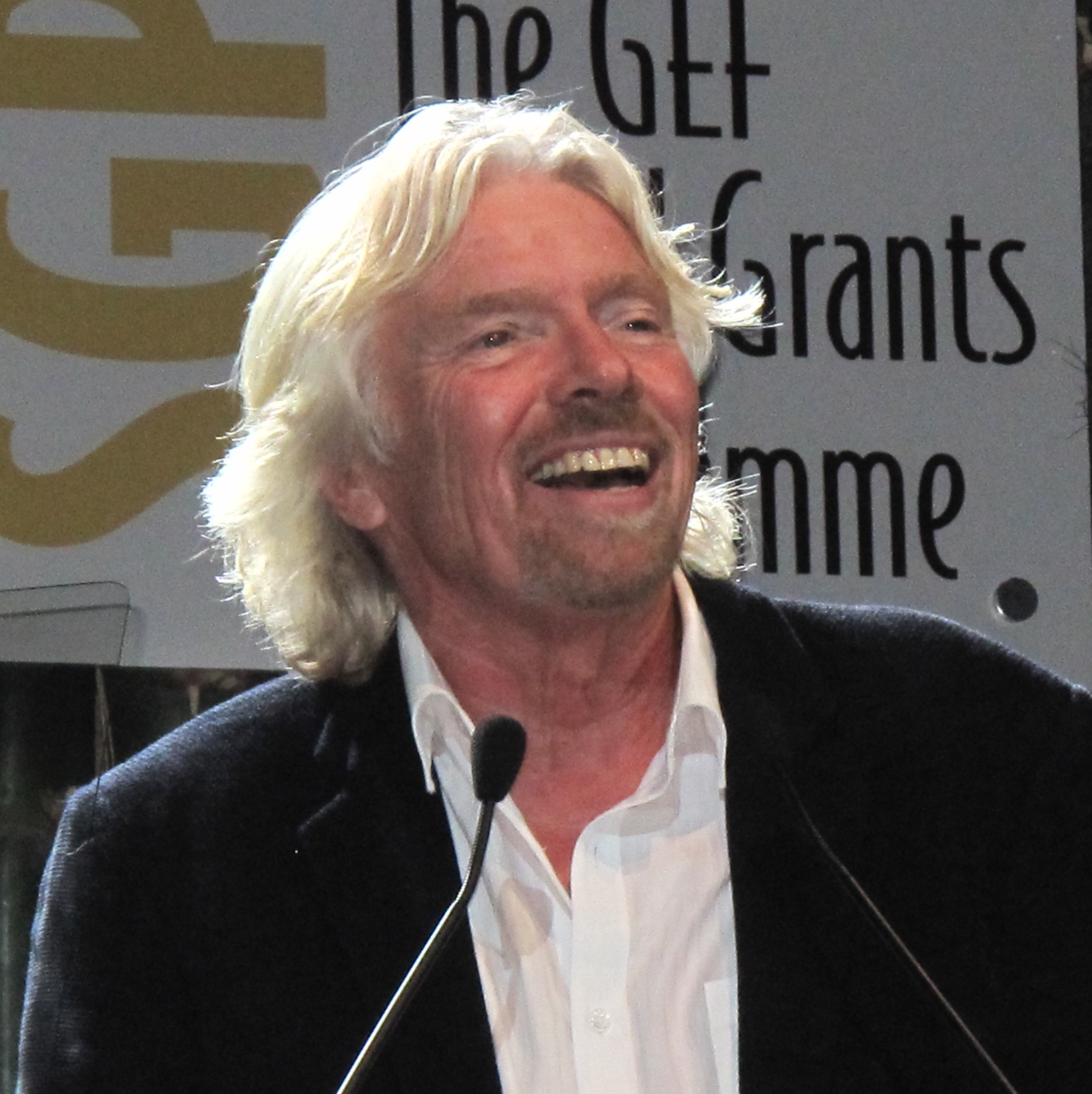
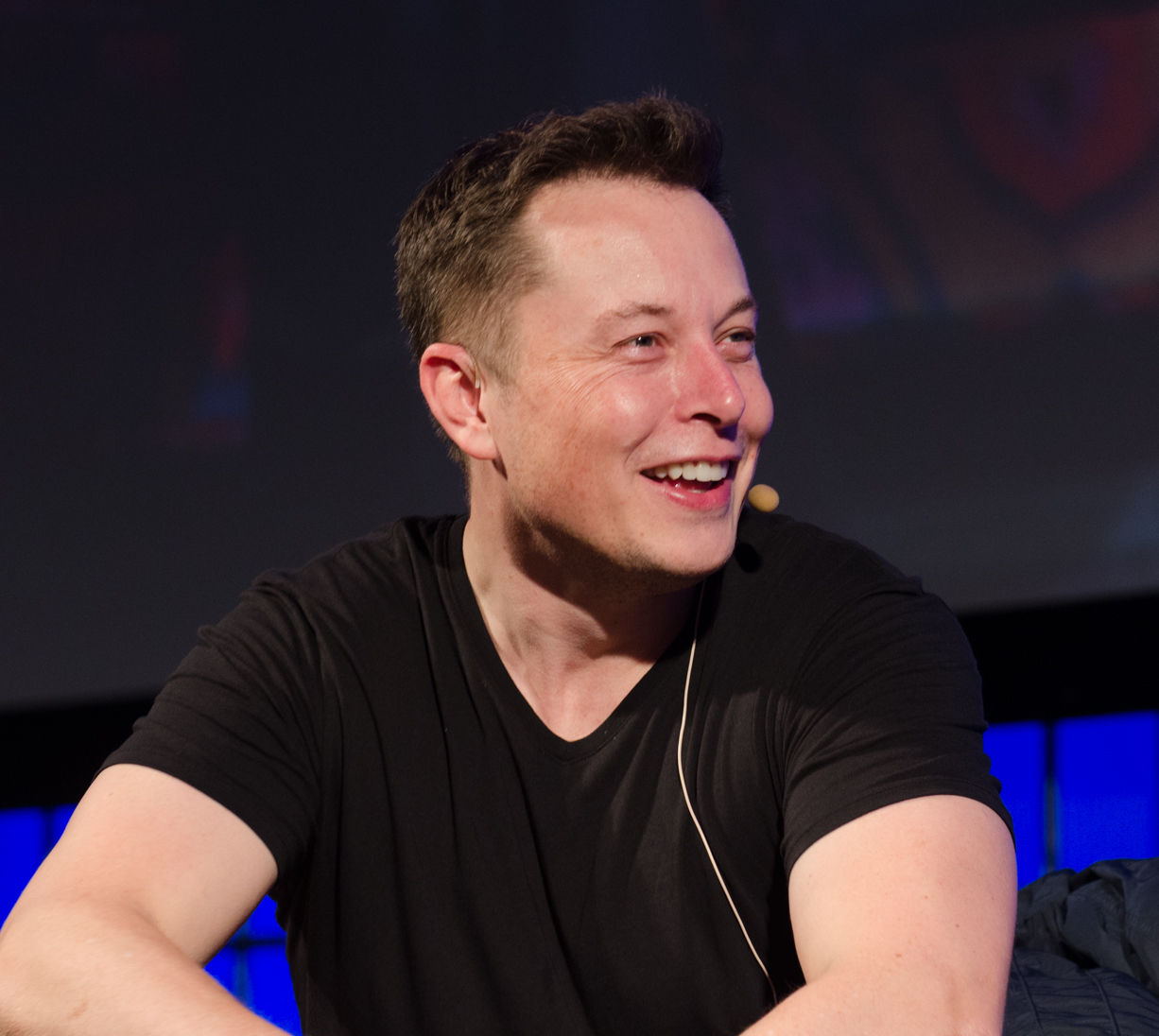
Jeff Bezos (top), Richard Branson (middle) and Elon Musk (bottom), widely seen as the main competitors of the billionaire space race

The billionaire space race is the rivalry among entrepreneurs who have entered the space industry from other industries – particularly computing. This private spaceflight race involves sending privately developed rockets and vehicles to various destinations in space, often in response to government programs or to develop the space tourism sector. Some of this competitiveness is part of the New Space Race.

Since 2018, the billionaire space race has primarily been between three billionaires and their respective firms:

- Jeff Bezos (2026 net worth ~$260B)'s Blue Origin, which is seeking to establish an industrial base in space, and his Amazon Leo subsidiary of Amazon seeking to provide satellite-based internet
- Richard Branson (2026 net worth ~$3B)'s Virgin Group (through Virgin Galactic and the now cancelled Virgin Orbit), which seeks to dominate space tourism, low-cost small orbital launch vehicles, and intercontinental sub-orbital spaceflight.
- Elon Musk (2026 net worth ~$900B)'s SpaceX, which seeks to colonize Mars as well as provide satellite-based internet through its Starlink project.

Prior to his death in 2018, Paul Allen was also a major player in the billionaire space race through the aerospace division of his firm Vulcan and his financing of programs such as Scaled Composites Tier One. Allen sought to reduce the cost of launching payloads into orbit.

== Background ==
The groundwork for the billionaire space race and private spaceflight was arguably laid by Peter Diamandis, an American entrepreneur. In the 1980s, he founded an American national student space society, the Students for the Exploration and Development of Space (SEDS). Later, Jeff Bezos became a chapter president of SEDS. In the 1990s, Diamandis, disappointed with the state of space development, spurred it on and sparked the suborbital space tourism market, by initiating a prize, the X Prize. This led to Paul Allen becoming involved in the competition, creating the Scaled Composites Tier One platform of SpaceShipOne and White Knight One which won the Ansari X-Prize in 2004. The technology of the winning entrant was then licensed by Richard Branson's Virgin Group as a basis to found Virgin Galactic. The base techniques of Tier One also form the basis for Stratolaunch Systems (formerly of Vulcan Aerospace).

Elon Musk's SpaceX was established in 2002, last among the three main rivals. Speaking at Cape Canaveral Space Force Station and without reference to private spaceflight, Elon Musk expressed excitement for a new space race in 2018.

Government programs have also fueled the billionaire space race. NASA programs such as the Commercial Crew Program (created in 2010, with grants mostly won by SpaceX and partially by Blue Origin) and the Artemis HLS program (awarded to SpaceX in 2021 and also to Blue Origin in 2023) have pushed the billionaires to compete against each other to be selected for those multi-billion dollar procurement programs. The competition has also resulted in court battles such as Blue Origin v. United States & SpaceX. Those government programs have provided critical funding for the new private space industry and its development.

== Major milestones ==
- 21 June 2004 – Scaled Composites Tier One, funded by Paul Allen, achieves the first entirely privately funded crewed flight to space (suborbital, crossing the 100 km Kármán line) with the SpaceShipOne flight 15P. The program won the Ansari X Prize later that year.
- 30 May 2020 – SpaceX successfully launches a Falcon 9 rocket carrying the Crew Dragon space capsule during the Demo-2 mission, marking the first privately developed crewed mission to orbit and to visit the International Space Station (ISS).
- 11 July 2021 – Richard Branson made a successful sub-orbital spaceflight as a member of Virgin Galactic Unity 22.
- 20 July 2021 – Jeff Bezos made a successful sub-orbital spaceflight aboard Blue Origin's NS-16, becoming the first billionaire space company founder to cross the Karman Line.
- 16 September 2021 – SpaceX operates the Inspiration4 mission, the first orbital spaceflight with only private citizens aboard.
- April 2023 – On its inaugural flight, Starship becomes the most powerful launch vehicle ever flown.
- May 2024 – Boosters (1st stage) of the Falcon 9 family of rockets have been reused over 300 times. Certification is in progress to be able to reuse a single booster 40 times.
- September 2024 – SpaceX operates the Polaris Dawn mission, which performs the first private spacewalk and becomes the furthest crewed mission from Earth since Apollo 17.
- January 2025 – First launch of New Glenn, Blue Origin's heavy lift reusable launcher contracted for the U.S. NASA Artemis program, NSSL, and other planetary missions.
- April 2025 At 01:46 (UTC), Fram2 launched aboard a SpaceX Falcon 9 rocket, becoming the first crewed spaceflight to enter a polar retrograde orbit, i.e., to fly over Earth's poles.

== Rivalries ==
=== SpaceX vs. Blue Origin ===
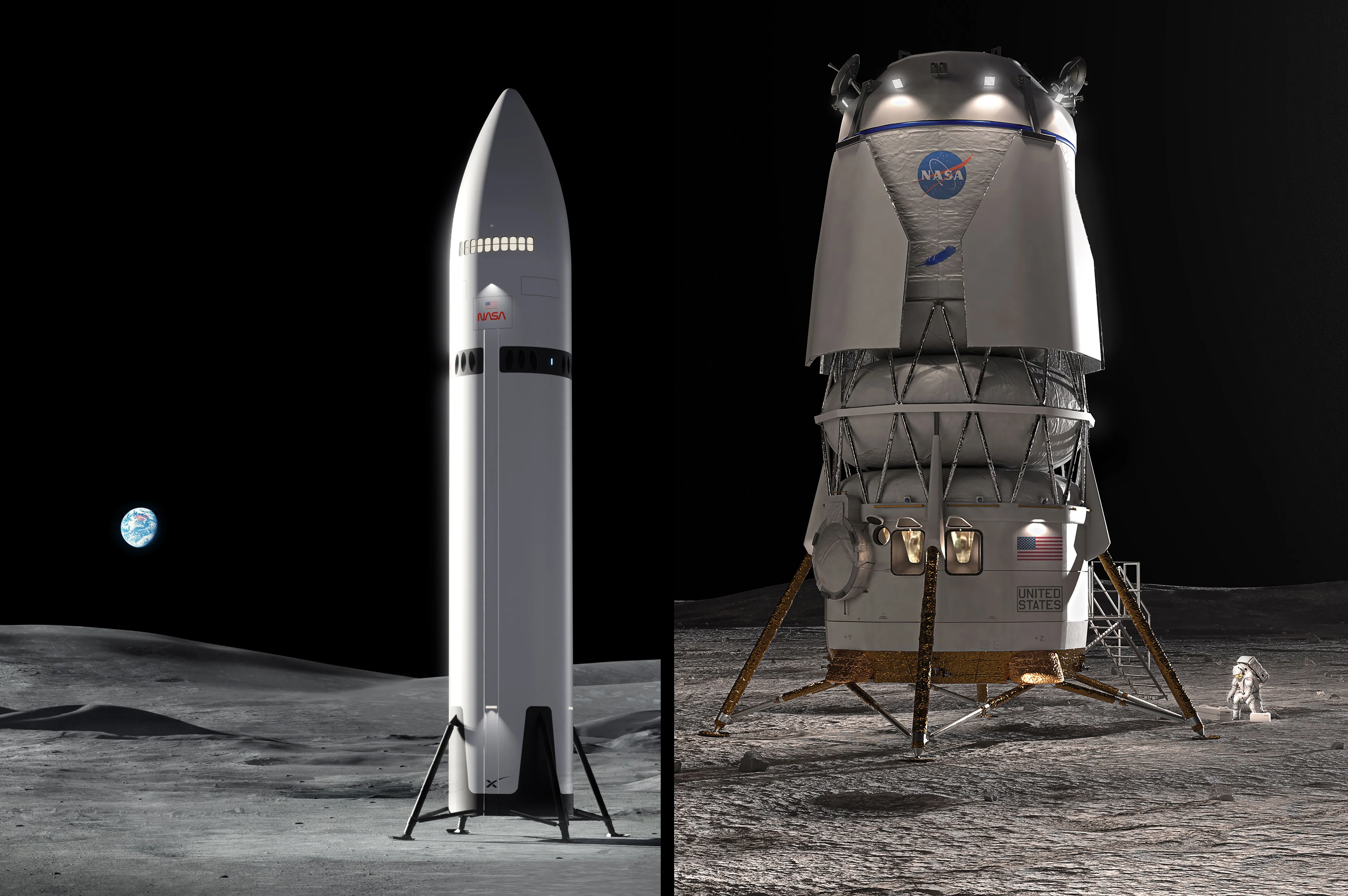
Renderings of the Human Landing System spacecraft: SpaceX's Starship HLS (left) and Blue Origin's Blue Moon Mark 2 (right)

SpaceX and Blue Origin have had a history of conflict. Blue Origin and SpaceX have had dueling press releases that compete with each other's announcements and events.

SpaceX and Blue Origin battled for the right to lease Kennedy Space Center LC-39A, the rocket launch platform that was used to launch the Apollo Moon missions. SpaceX won the lease in 2013, but Blue Origin filed suit in court against that. It is currently in the hands of SpaceX, while Blue Origin rented SLC-36 instead.

SpaceX filed suit against Blue Origin to invalidate their patent on landing rockets aboard ships at sea. They won their court fight in 2014. SpaceX had been attempting to land rockets at sea since 2014, finally succeeding in 2016, before Blue Origin first built a sea-going platform for landing rockets.

SpaceX and Blue Origin got into a Twitter battle about the meaning of a used rocket, landed rocket, and spacerocket, at the end of 2015, when New Shepard successfully landed, after a suborbital jaunt into space. SpaceX had previously launched and landed its Grasshopper rocket multiple times without reaching space. Then SpaceX landed a Falcon 9 first stage, which had been used to launch a satellite into orbit, prompting more Twitter battles at the start of 2016, such as Bezos tweeting "welcome to the club".

In late 2016, Blue Origin announced the New Glenn, directly competing against SpaceX's Falcon Heavy, with a larger rocket but lower payload.

At the 2016 International Astronautical Congress in Guadalajara, Mexico, Blue Origin President Rob Meyerson elaborated on the Bezos vision previously outlined in the New Glenn announcement. The Blue Origin New Armstrong would be similar in function to the SpaceX Interplanetary Transport System that Elon Musk unveiled at the same conference.

In April 2021, SpaceX beat Blue Origin to a $2.9 billion contract to build the lunar lander for NASA's Artemis program. In August 2021, Blue Origin subsequently began a legal case against NASA and SpaceX in the Court of Federal Claims, which was dismissed in November of the same year. About two years later in May 2023, NASA awarded Blue Origin a $3.4 billion contract to develop a competing Moon lander, noting that "adding another human landing system partner to NASA's Artemis program will increase competition, reduce costs to taxpayers, support a regular cadence of lunar landings, further invest in the lunar economy, and help NASA achieve its goals on and around the Moon in preparation for future astronaut missions to Mars."

=== Blue Origin vs. Virgin Galactic ===
Blue Origin and Virgin Galactic are in the same market, suborbital space tourism, with the space capsule New Shepard and the spaceplane SpaceShipTwo, respectively. The two systems made their first flights with multiple passengers within 10 days of each other: SpaceShipTwo flew on July 11, 2021, and New Shepard followed on July 20, both carrying their billionaire founders and a few other passengers. As of July 2023, SpaceShipTwo has made three tourism flights with two pilots and four passengers each, while New Shepard has made six flights with six passengers each.

In May 2023, Richard Branson ended Virgin Orbit in bankruptcy, and then in December 2023, he announced that he would not invest more money in Virgin Galactic. Having already put one billion dollars into the project, he said that they should have enough money to continue without more from him.

== Former rivalries ==
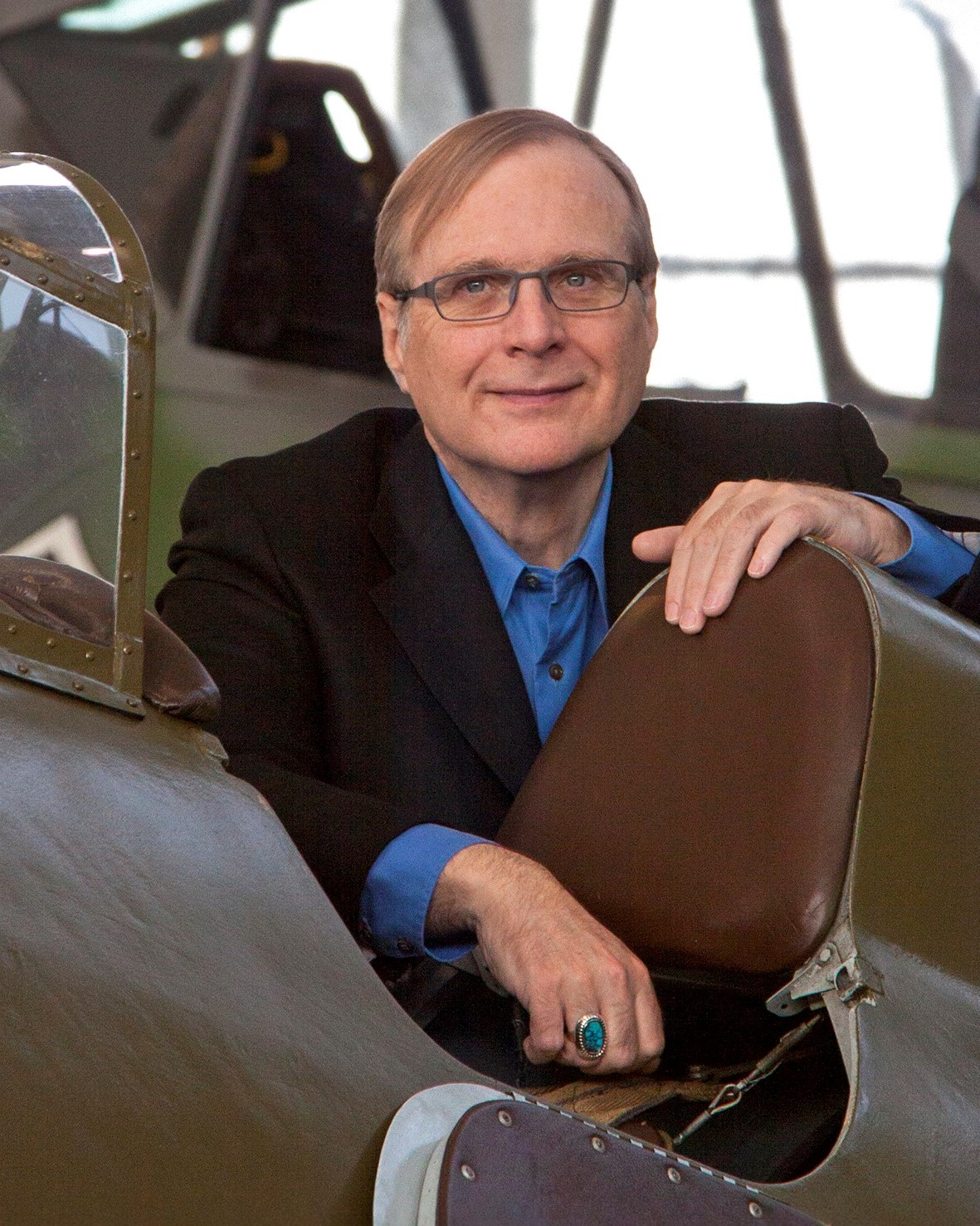
Paul Allen, co-founder of Microsoft, was an active early participant in the billionaire space race.

=== Stratolaunch vs. Virgin Orbit ===
The Stratolaunch rivalries are no longer part of the billionaire space race, after 2019, having been suspended at the time of Paul Allen's death. The Stratolaunch company has since continued operations under new ownership, but does not focus on orbital space launches anymore.

Vulcan Aerospace subsidiary Stratolaunch Systems planned to air-launch satellite launcher rockets, the same profile as planned by Virgin Orbit for its LauncherOne operations. While LauncherOne was developed and launch aircraft procured (once White Knight Two, now 747 Cosmic Girl), the Scaled Composites "Roc" Model 351 is still being developed (as of 2022) and the rocket to mate to it (the company has refocused away from orbital spaceflight) has yet to be selected. After the death of Paul Allen in 2018, Stratolaunch was sold, and is no longer a billionaire insurgent venture.

== Criticism ==
The critical response to space tourism has lambasted billionaire founders (e.g., Richard Branson and Jeff Bezos) and questioned their environmental, financial, and social/ethical practices.

== See also ==
- The Space Barons, 2018 book by Christian Davenport
- Cold War Space Race; between the US and USSR; leading to the Race to the Moon
- Space launch market competition
- Commercialization of space
- Mars race
- List of billionaire spacetravellers
