= United States–India Initiative on Critical and Emerging Technology =

Bilateral collaborative framework

United States–India Initiative on Critical and Emerging Technology, or iCET, is a collaborative framework established by the United States and India to enhance cooperation in developing fields of technology. These areas encompass artificial intelligence, quantum computing, semiconductors, and wireless telecommunication.

== Background ==
In May 2022, United States President Joe Biden and Prime Minister of India Narendra Modi jointly unveiled the iCET. Subsequently, on January 31, 2023, the inaugural iCET meeting took place in Washington, D.C., led by the respective National Security Advisors of both countries.

Also, to promote research and collaboration in the field of quantum technology, the two countries created a collaborative Indo-U.S. quantum coordination mechanism. This mechanism involves participants from various sectors, including industry, academia, and government, who work together to facilitate joint efforts and partnerships.

== Collaboration ==
In order to manufacture chips for national security needs, the US military has partnered with Indian startups to establish a semiconductor fabrication plant in India. With assistance from the India Semiconductor Mission and a strategic technology cooperation between the United States Space Force (USSF), Bharat Semi, and 3rdiTech, the fabrication plant would produce silicon carbide, infrared, and gallium nitride chips. The plant will prioritize supplying the high-voltage power electronics, advanced communications, and advanced sensors that are the three fundamental foundations of modern warfare. The chips will also be utilized in data centers, communications infrastructure, green energy systems, and railroads. It will support the development of a reliable and robust supply chain in the crucial area of national security. The two-way cooperation is part of the CHIPS and Science Act and United States–India Initiative on Critical and Emerging Technology. In order to design and develop military-grade semiconductor for night vision devices, missile guidance, space sensors, drones, fighter aircraft, electric vehicles, military communications, radars, and jammers, the collaboration involves setting up design hubs, testing centers, centers of excellence, and two fabrication units. The project will receive a 50% capital expenditure subsidy from India Semiconductor Mission.

To address the defense demands of the United States, its allies, and India, the Shakti Semiconductor Fab will acquire complete expertise in the development of compound semiconductors. The factory will begin phase one production from 2027, with an annual target of 50,000 units. The establishment of the facility would cost $500 million in investments. General Atomics is 3rdiTech's technology validation partner. The company has worked under United States Department of Defense and Ministry of Defence in UK.

Designed for national security, the fabrication plant is the first multi-material fabrication facility in the world. On September 21, 2024, at a bilateral meeting between President Joe Biden and Prime Minister Narendra Modi in Delaware, the blueprint for the Bharat Semi Fab was revealed. The strategic significance of this project is further enhanced by the fact that it represents the US Space Force's first-ever international technology partnership.

Under iCET, United States and India announced setting aside more than $2 million in 2024 for collaborative research initiatives that will advance AI and quantum technology.

== See also ==
- India-United States Defense Acceleration Ecosystem
