= India–United States Defense Acceleration Ecosystem =

Bilateral alliance between India and the United States

India–United States Defense Acceleration Ecosystem (INDUS-X) is a strategic alliance in technology and defense industry collaboration between the U.S. Department of Defense (DoD) and the Indian Ministry of Defense (MoD). The INDUS-X platform promotes collaboration among defense firms, startups and academic institutions.

== Background ==
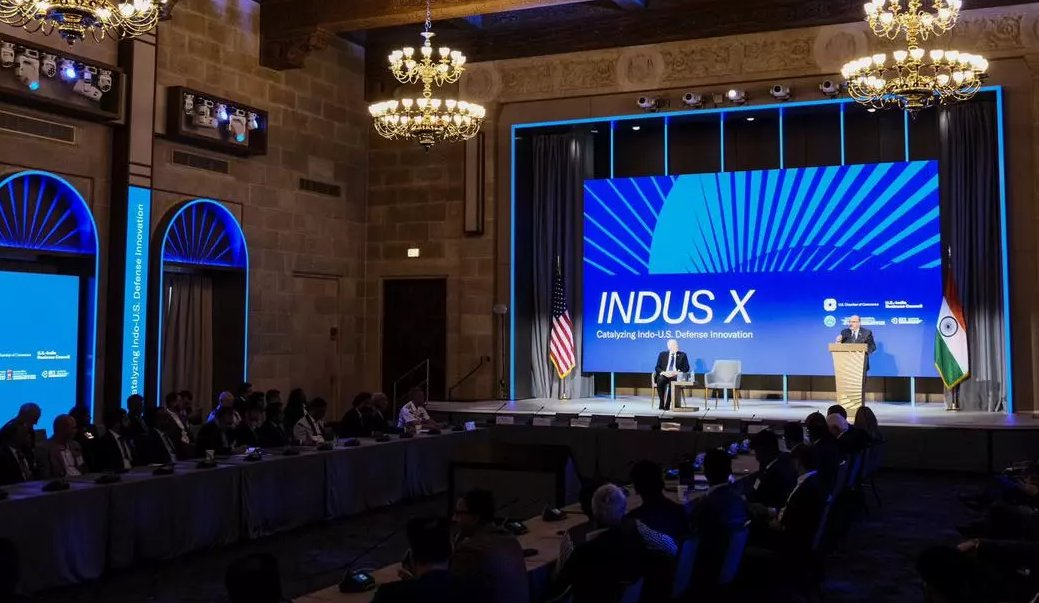
Launch of INDUS-X at USCC in June 2023

The alliance was launched on 21 June 2023 in Washington, D.C. by the United States Department of Defense and the Ministry of Defence at an event hosted by the U.S.-India Business Council. During the event a factsheet was disseminated that detailed the collaboration plan for INDUS-X participants. This plan is centered around two main themes: 'Bilateral Cooperation Mechanism,' and 'Public–Private Partnerships.' Representatives of more than 30 U.S. and Indian start-ups, government, academic, business, and leaders participated in the event.

The inauguration of INDUS-X occurred concurrently with a three-day state visit to the United States by Indian prime minister Narendra Modi hosted by president Joe Biden, shortly after the activation of the United States-India Initiative on Critical and Emerging Technology (iCET).
