= Endless Frontier: Vannevar Bush, Engineer of the American Century =

Book by G. Pascal Zachary

- 1997 Free Press book jacket
- Author: G. Pascal Zachary
- Subject: Vannevar Bush; History of technology, art, science, and militaries
- Genre: Biography
- Set in: the United States and Washington D.C.
- Published: 1997, 1999
- Publisher: Free Press, MIT Press
- Publication place: United States
- Media type: Print, Ebook
- Pages: 518
- ISBN: 9780684828213
- OCLC: 36521020
- Website: Official website

Endless Frontier: Vannevar Bush, Engineer of the American Century is a 1997 non-fiction book written by G. Pascal Zachary, published by The Free Press. It is a biography of Vannevar Bush

Zachary described how the internet was preceded by the memex and rapid selector, things created by Bush.

== Book organization ==
The narrative of this biography is divided into four parts:

- Part 1. The education of an engineer
- Part 2. Preparing for war
- Part 3. Modern arms and free men
- Part 4. The new world

== Reception ==
Thomas P. Hughes of the University of Pennsylvania wrote in The New York Times that the book "captured the spirit of Bush and his times" and that author was "Deeply informed and insightful". Zachary believed that Bush's views of giving supremacy to intellectuals and universities would not be tolerated by federal politicians in the 1990s and that, in Hughes's words, the author was "Zachary is impatient with Bush for resisting people whom he considered government interventionists".

Kirkus Reviews stated that the "biography demonstrates" how Bush is "a complex, deeply controversial, and profoundly influential figure."
