= Les Leopold =

American journalist and activist

Les Leopold is the co-founder and executive director of the Labor Institute. He is a graduate of Oberlin College and the Woodrow Wilson School of Public and International Affairs at Princeton University.

== Books ==
- Wall Street's War on Workers: How Mass Layoffs and Greed Are Destroying the Working Class and What to Do About It (2024)
- Runaway Inequality: An Activist's Guide to Economic Justice (Labor Institute Press, 2015)
- How to Make a Million Dollars an Hour: Why Financial Elites Get Away With Siphoning off America's Wealth (John Wiley and Sons, 2013)
- The Looting of America: How Wall Street's Game of Fantasy Finance destroyed our Jobs, Pensions and Prosperity, and What We Can Do About It (Chelsea Green Publishing, 2009)
- The Man Who Hated Work and Loved Labor: The Life and Times of Tony Mazzocchi (Chelsea Green Publishing, 2006)
