= United States Innovation and Competition Act =

United States legislation

U.S. Innovation and Competition Act
- Long title: To establish a new Directorate for Technology and Innovation in the National Science Foundation, to establish a regional technology hub program, to require a strategy and report on economic security, science, research, innovation, manufacturing, and job creation, to establish a critical supply chain resiliency program, and for other purposes.
- Number of co-sponsors: 13

Legislative history
- Introduced in the Senate as S. 1260 by Chuck Schumer (D–NY) on April 20, 2021; Committee consideration by Senate Commerce; Passed the Senate with amendment on June 8, 2021 (68–32)

The United States Innovation and Competition Act of 2021 (USICA) (S. 1260), formerly known as the Endless Frontier Act, was United States legislation sponsored by Senators Chuck Schumer (D-NY) and Todd Young (R-IN) authorizing $110 billion for basic and advanced technology research over a five-year period. Investment in basic and advanced research, commercialization, and education and training programs in artificial intelligence, semiconductors, quantum computing, advanced communications, biotechnology and advanced energy, amounts to $100 billion. Over $10 billion was authorized for appropriation to designate ten regional technology hubs and create a supply chain crisis-response program. The act was aimed at competing with China by bolstering American technology and manufacturing.

A modified version of the bill became law on August 9, 2022, as the CHIPS and Science Act.

== Legislative history ==
Before the full Senate vote, some Republican lawmakers such as Marco Rubio called for provisions that would prevent the allocation of grants to companies with financial ties to the People's Republic of China. Rubio's amendment to limit the Director of National Intelligence from issuing grants to companies invested in the People's Republic of China was tabled 55–40. On June 8, 2021, the USICA passed 68–32 in the Senate with bipartisan support.

The America COMPETES Act of 2022 (H.R.4521) passed the House on February 4, 2022. The Senate passed an amended bill by substituting the text of H.R.4521 with the text of the USICA on March 28, 2022. A Senate and House conference was required to reconcile the differences.

Congress	Short title	Bill number(s)	Date introduced	Sponsor(s)	# of cosponsors	Latest status
116th Congress	Endless Frontier Act of 2020	H.R. 6978	May 22, 2020	Ro Khanna (D-CA)	12	Died in committee
116th Congress	Endless Frontier Act of 2020	S.3832	May 21, 2020	Chuck Schumer (D-NY)	7	Died in committee
117th Congress	Endless Frontier Act of 2021	H.R.2731	April 21, 2021	Ro Khanna (D-CA)	24	Referred to committees of jurisdiction.
117th Congress	America COMPETES Act of 2022	H.R.4521	July 19, 2021	Eddie Bernice Johnson (D-TX)	101	Enacted as part of CHIPS and Science Act
117th Congress	United States Innovation and Competition Act of 2021	S.1260	April 20, 2021	Chuck Schumer (D-NY)	13	Passed in the Senate (68–32).

== Responses ==
President Joe Biden released a statement supporting the bill saying "I'm heartened by Congress’ bipartisan work so far, and its commitment to quick action to get this to my desk as soon as possible. Together, we have an opportunity to show China and the rest of the world that the 21st century will be the American century – forged by the ingenuity and hard work of our innovators, workers, and businesses."

The bill has been described by the New York Times as “the most expansive industrial policy legislation in U.S. history.”

Organizations which have supported USICA include the AFL-CIO, National Association of Manufacturers, Semiconductor Industry Association, Thurgood Marshall College Fund and American Association of Universities. A letter organized by the Semiconductor Industry Association which called on Congress to pass the bill was signed by more than 100 CEOs.

A poll conducted by the left wing think tank Data for Progress showed that 73% of respondents supported the bill. The editorial boards of the Seattle Times and Buffalo News have both called for the passage of the bill into law.

The Chinese government has criticized the bill for its provisions on Taiwan and "Cold War mentality and ideological prejudice", and has warned of retaliation if it becomes law. Schumer, one of the co-sponsors of the bill, has dismissed those threats, saying “No one will stand in the way of America strengthening our innovation capacity and domestic production so that we can launch a new era of leadership.”

In November 2021, it was reported that some U.S. executives received letters from China's embassy in Washington, D.C., which pressed U.S. businesses to lobby, in possible violation of the Foreign Agents Registration Act (FARA), members of the Congress to alter or drop specific bills that seek to enhance U.S. competitiveness. The Chinese embassy explicitly asked companies to oppose the USICA and the Eagle Act (H.R. 3524), and warned that if the legislation passed, U.S. companies would risk losing market shares or revenues in China.

== See also ==
- America COMPETES Act of 2022
- Science, The Endless Frontier, a 1945 report by Vannevar Bush to the President of the United States
- New Frontier
- Sputnik crisis, National Defense Education Act
- Project 985, Project 211, Made in China 2025, Belt and Road Initiative
