= Aldebaran (rocket) =

Rocket

Aldebaran logo

Aldebaran is a proposed air-launched microsatellite launch vehicle testbed studied by CDTI, CNES and DLR for a future launcher capable of lifting up to 300 kilograms (660 lb) into Low Earth Orbit.

== Development ==
The project began in 2007 to develop a microsatellite launch vehicle for Europe. Current launch vehicles Ariane 5, Soyuz and Vega are able to cover all commercial missions, except small (300 kilograms (660 lb)) and nano (50 kilograms (110 lb)) satellites. Aldebaran is supposed to help by developing means of filling that gap which is especially important due to progressing miniaturization of satellites and the success of numerous science and defense experiments based on microsats.

Microsatellite launcher became an interest because of numerous successful technology experiences based on microsats, for science or defense with gradual increase in instrument performance with constant improvement of quality to price ratio. Rebirth of interest for constellations (like Orbcomm) and formation flying, with increasing number of operational applications accessible: communications, intelligence gathering, early warning, space surveillance, different type of observation, etc. New evidence of the vulnerability of the big space systems and an increasing interest for the "responsive space" approach in the US and other countries (China, etc.), which prefer small size in order to reduce global costs et delays, and facilitate the implementation of new technologies.

Aldebaran is not a commercial project; its primary goal is to focus technologies on a flight test bed developing future technologies, industrial skills and competencies of research centres. In total, development costs were planned to be below €400 million with launch costs between €2.5 and €7 million.

== Selection of concepts ==
At the beginning of 2009, 2 concepts and a backup have been selected for a phase A study focusing on the choice of technologies, with a more detailed definition of the associated concept and the launch of preliminary technological experimentations.

At the end of the phase A, one single concept will finally be retained for the development phases (B/C/D) starting in late 2010. The first technological flight is foreseen around 2015. Following three concepts were initially considered:

- MLA, for Airborne Micro Launcher, used a fighter aircraft and a high subsonic flight path releasing a rocket-propelled launcher. It is the smallest system identified as able to reach orbit thanks to the help of the aircraft (human scale).
- CATS, for Cheap Access to Space, was a conventional expendable launch system launched from a classical launch pad, probably in Guiana Space Centre. The definition of this second concept is already in discussion and will be fixed during the first part of the phase A.
- HORVS, for High Operational Responsive and Versatile System, was another airborne launch system retained as a backup of the first one. It was a rocket dropped from inside of an Airbus A400M Atlas cargo bay with a drogue parachute to slow it down and align vertically before ignition. The concept presents higher risk and complexity due to the method of extraction and safety rules but will have a better performance potential compared to the fighter option.

== MLA ==
Developed by Astrium and Dassault Aviation MLA would be fighter-launched multistage launch vehicle capable of placing 50–70 kg or 150 kg into Low Earth Orbit depending on a configuration. French military officials have signaled some interest in a responsive space launcher concept similar to what the United States is investigating.

Fighter aircraft offers an ability to maximize the gain due to airborne launch thanks achieving optimal altitude, velocity and flight path angle offering the possibility of a simplified sequence for jettisoning the launcher without important aerodynamic support like a big wings on Pegasus. Additional advantages include a possibility of fighter in-flight refueling, low infrastructure requirements and an ability of returning to any fighter-capable airfield in case of launch abort.

However launch vehicle mass and volume capacity is limited due to the generally small size of the plane and any constraint such as the train trap deployment, aerobrakes or ground clearance.

=== MLA-D ===
Launch vehicle proposed by Astrium, also known as MLA-D, would be 6.5 metres (21 ft) long, 0.9 metres (2 ft 11 in) in diameter, and weigh 4 tonnes. The first stage would consist of a 3-tonne Solid rocket booster with gimbaled nozzle. The upper stage would use a liquid fuel engine with up to 600 kg fuel reserve and largely composite structure. Fairing could be either cylindrical (0.94 m diameter, 1.8 m length) or elliptical (1.05 x 2 x 1.8 m). Fighter used to lift the rocket would be either Dassault Rafale with rocket under the fuselage or Eurofighter Typhoon with rocket under the wing.

=== MLA-Trimaran ===
Dassault Aviation configuration, also known as MLA-Trimaran, or simply MLA, was a 3-stage rocket composed of core stage under the fighter fuselage and two connected boosters under the wings. With a launcher mass close to the maximum capacity of Dassault Rafale it could lift up to 150 kg into LEO.

Typical mission profile would include fighter lifting the rocket up to 12 km at a speed of Mach 0.7 pulling up to release MLA at an optimum angle. 4 seconds after the separations boosters would ignite accelerating rocket to Mach 6.5 at 36 km altitude in 42 seconds. After boosters separation 2nd stage would ignite achieving velocity of 4.5 km/s at the altitude of 78.5 km. Following fairing separation and 3rd stage ignition rocket would achieve transfer orbit 359 seconds into the flight at the altitude of 250 km at speed of 7.9 km/s shutting down for a ballistic phase. Circulation would be completed at a final 800 km orbit.

Many aspects of the proposition have been completed including deep studies on possible critical aspects such as stability, interaction with the aircraft or separation phases with no stoppers identified. Fighter flight qualities are similar to these with three external 2000 liter fuel tanks.

Orbit	Performance
Low Earth Orbit 300 km x 300 km x 28.5°	250 kg
Sun-synchronous orbit 300 km x 300 km	180 kg
Sun-synchronous orbit 800 km x 800 km	150 kg

== Related projects ==
- Future Launchers Preparatory Programme
- FESTIP
- ASTRA programme

== Comparable rockets ==
- Pegasus
- LauncherOne

=== Canceled or under development ===
- Falcon 9 Air
- Airborne Launch Assist Space Access
- MAKS
- Pegasus II
- XCOR Lynx Mark III
