= Hermes (spacecraft) =

French crewed spaceplane concept (1975–1992)

- Artist's impression of Hermes
- Designer: Centre National d'Études Spatiales
- Country of origin: France

Specifications
- Spacecraft type: Spaceplane
- Launch mass: 21,000 kg (46,000 lb)
- Payload capacity: 3,000 kg (6,600 lb)
- Crew capacity: 3
- Design life: 30 to 90 days

Production
- Status: Cancelled

Hermes was a proposed spaceplane designed by the French Centre National d'Études Spatiales (CNES) in 1975, and later by the European Space Agency (ESA). It was superficially similar to the American Boeing X-20 Dyna-Soar and the larger Space Shuttle.

In January 1985, CNES proposed to proceed with Hermes development under the auspices of the ESA. Hermes was to have been a crewed spaceflight program launched by an Ariane 5 launch vehicle. In November 1987, the project was approved for pre-development from 1988 to 1990, after which authorisation for full development was required. However, the project experienced numerous delays and funding issues.

In 1992, Hermes was cancelled due to high cost and unachievable performance, as well as a partnership with the Russian Aviation and Space Agency (RKA) which reduced the need for an independent spaceplane. As a result, no Hermes shuttles were ever built. During the 2010s, it was proposed to resurrect the Hermes vehicle as a partially reusable air-launched spaceplane launch system, known as SOAR.

== Development ==
=== Origins ===
During the 1960s and 1970s, there was increasing recognition by European nations that more international cooperation would be necessary for large space projects. In 1973, the European Space Research Organisation (ESRO) — a precursor to the European Space Agency (ESA) — commenced development of a heavy expendable launch system later named the Ariane. The French space agency Centre National D'études Spatiales (CNES), desired greater autonomy to avoid overreliance upon NASA, and envisaged a European-built human-capable space vehicle that would operate in conjunction with other ESA assets such as Ariane.

In 1976, CNES commenced studies into a crewed version of Ariane. Two different concepts included a capsule and a glider. In 1983, CNES opted to focus on a space plane that would deliver greater convenience, comfort, and cost-effectiveness. A space plane would simplify recovery by having the necessary cross-range manoeuvrability to reach a given point on the Earth within a single day, while providing for a less challenging re-entry environment for the crew and payload. Reusability would also reduce the cost of successive missions. Critical technologies identified included thermal protection, environmental controls, life support systems, aerodynamics, and power.

During the mid-1980s, in addition to the Columbus Man-Tended Free Flyer (an independent European space station) and the Ariane 5 heavy launch vehicle, CNES championed the development and production of the Space Shuttle as a European initiative akin to the reusable space vehicle programs of the Soviet Union's Buran and the US Space Shuttle.

=== Selection ===
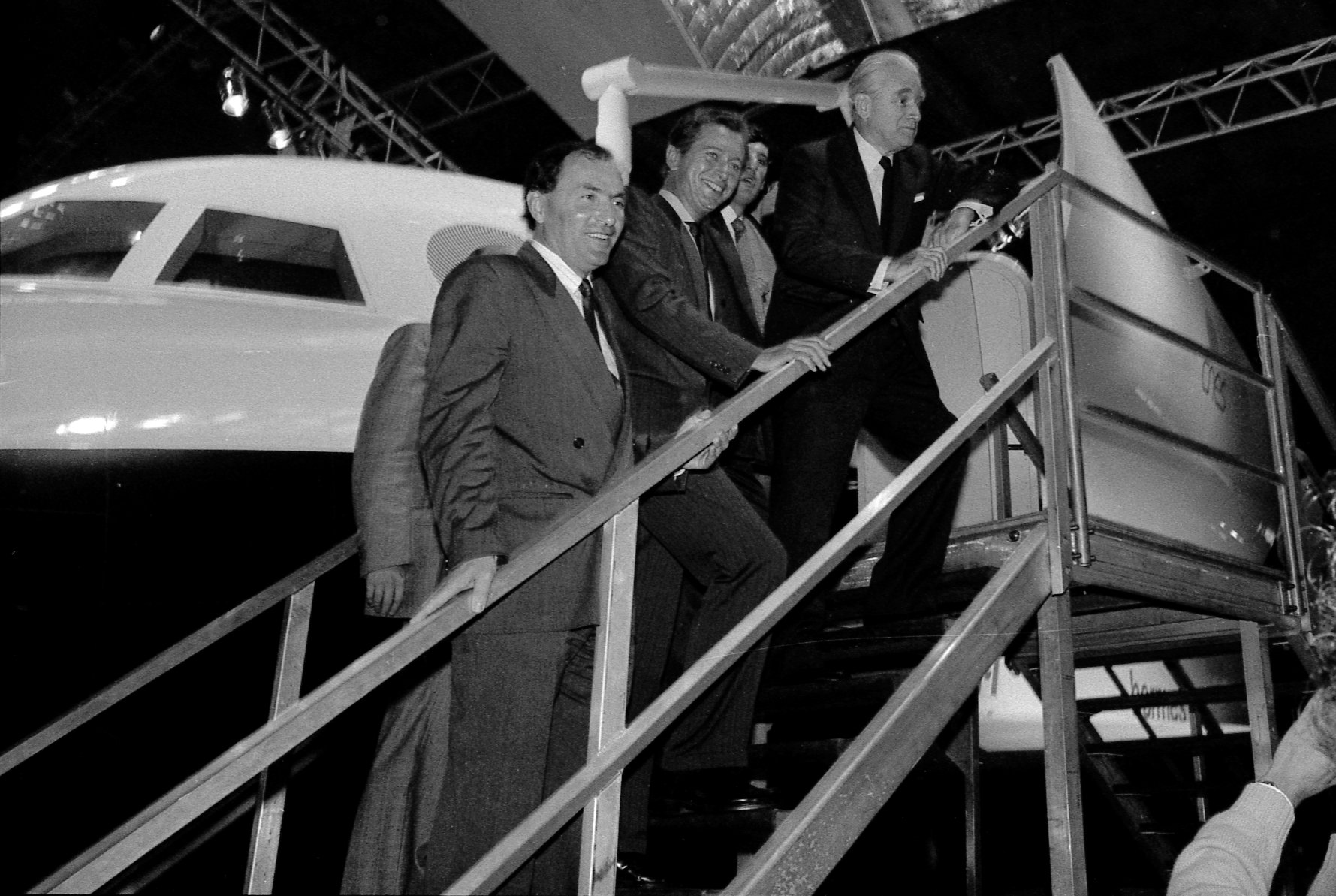
Jacques Chaban-Delmas and Dominique Baudis in front of a full-scale mock-up in Toulouse, October 1987

On 18 October 1985, CNES appointed French aerospace company Aérospatiale as the primary contractor for Hermes, the name that had been given to the spacecraft. French aircraft manufacturer Dassault-Breguet was awarded responsibility for the aerodynamic and aerothermal aspects of the design. Arianespace was responsible for the Ariane 5 launcher and a strong candidate to manage operation of the infrastructure for Hermes.

On 25 October 1985, the proposal for Hermes was presented to the partner nations of the ESA. A deadline of March 1987 was set for the 'Europeanisation' of the programme, under which portions of work for Hermes was assigned. The work share was attributed 15% to West Germany, 13% to Italy, 7% to Belgium, 5% to the Netherlands, 4% each to the United Kingdom, Spain, and Sweden, and 2% or less to Switzerland, Austria, Denmark and Ireland. Potential participation by Norway and Canada was mooted. France held a 50 percent share of the work, although CNES was open to further redistribution of the work dependent upon individual partners increasing their stake in the programme. Early on, there was optimism that securing the funding from ESA members to proceed would not be difficult.

In November 1987, the ESA issued its approval. As envisaged, by 1995 Hermes would enable the ESA to service the planned Columbus Man-Tended Free Flyer (MTFF) (the MTFF was restructured and ultimately manufactured as the Columbus module of the International Space Station). Development of Hermes was to proceed in two phases:

=== Phase 1: Study and pre-development ===
Phase 1 was scheduled to end in 1990. Its plans called for the capability to lift six astronauts and 4,550 kg (10,030 lb) of cargo, but after the Challenger disaster, an ejection capacity was added to give astronauts at least a small chance of survival in case of catastrophe. Accordingly, the six seats were curtailed to three regular ejection seats, which were chosen over an ejectable crew capsule that would have offered an escape option at heights above 28 km (17 mi). The cargo capacity was reduced to 3,000 kg (6,600 lb). Hermes would not be able to place objects into orbit because its cargo hold could not be opened; that option was abandoned due to weight concerns.

Although Hermes was originally viewed as fully reusable (up to 30 re-entries before major service), the limited capacity of the Ariane 5 launcher forced it to leave the Resource Module in orbit. A new resource module would be attached to the Hermes and the entire structure would be launched again.

Phase 1 was not completed until the end of 1991 and by then the political climate had changed considerably. The Iron Curtain had been lifted and the Cold War was ending. As a result, ESA commenced a year-long "reflection" period to determine whether it still made sense for Europe to build its own space shuttle and space station or if new partners could be found to share cost and development. Officially, Phase 1 completed at the end of 1992.

=== Phase 2: Final development, manufacture and initial operations ===
Phase 2 never began, after ESA and the Russian Aviation and Space Agency (RKA) agreed to cooperate on future launchers and a replacement space station for Mir. Economic concerns prevented RKA from participating in a future launcher program, but at this point ESA's crew transport needs were reoriented towards the capsule system (as opposed to the glider system of Hermes) called for by the joint Russian/European designs.

When both Russia and ESA joined with NASA to build the International Space Station, the need for a European crew transport system was eliminated because Russian and American needs were already satisfied. Accordingly, ESA abandoned the Hermes project.

== Design ==
Hermes was intended as a reusable launch system to transport astronauts and moderate-size cargo payloads into low Earth orbit (LEO) and back. Hermes bears a resemblance to other reusable launch vehicles such as the Space Shuttle. However, unlike the Space Shuttle, Hermes could not carry heavy cargoes as that role was to be performed by the uncrewed Ariane 5. Hermes was envisioned to transport a maximum of three astronauts along with a 3,000 kg (6,600 lb) pressurized payload. The launch weight would be up to 21,000 kg (46,000 lb), the practical upper limit of an extended Ariane 5 launcher.

Hermes was to be launched as the upper stage of the Ariane 5. Prior to the 1986 redesign, Hermes was a single spaceplane containing (front to back) a crew compartment for six, an airlock, an unpressurized cargo hold similar to Buran's and the Shuttle's, and a service module. After the 1986 Challenger accident it was substantially redesigned. The crew cabin shrank to carry three astronauts, with the cargo hold pressurized and unable to carry or retrieve satellites. Hermes now consisted of two separate sections: the vehicle itself and a cone-shaped Resource Module having a docking mechanism attached to the vehicle's rear, which was detached and discarded prior to re-entry. Only the crewed vehicle would re-enter Earth's atmosphere and be re-used. The Resource Module and the launcher would be expended. When launching the Hermes, the Ariane 5 would have had its upper stage replaced by the space plane and an adaptor to mate the vehicle to the main cryogenic stage. The equipment bay of the launcher would also be removed and the spaceplane would perform all guidance and control functions. The development of the Ariane 5 was strongly influenced by the requirements of Hermes, such as the extra aerodynamic loads along with an increased reliability factor of 0.9999, while retaining minimal impact on the launcher's commercial competitiveness on non-Hermes missions.

In comparison to the Space Shuttle, Hermes was substantially smaller. It did not share the ogival planform of the Shuttle, instead opting for a highly-swept delta wing complete with wingtip devices, similar to the proposed Boeing X-20 Dyna-Soar spacecraft. Like the Shuttle, the pressurised cabin could seat more than five people, two of whom would serve as pilots, while the unpressurised aft cargo bay would have been fitted with large doors spanning the length of the bay along the fuselage. The vehicle would have been powered by a pair of 2,000N-thrust liquid propellant rocket motors identical to those used on the L4 low-energy upper stage of the Ariane 5.

Aerodynamic control would have been provided via a total of seven flight control surfaces, the wingtip rudders, trailing edge elevon/air brakes, and a body-mounted flap; these surfaces would have been controlled via quadruplex-redundant digital flight controls and actuated via triplex-redundant hydraulics. Mission management would have been performed via three general-purpose computers, a monitoring computer, and three digital databuses. Electrical power was to be provided by a motor that would have used liquid oxygen-liquid hydrogen along with ten US-built fuel cells. The environmental control and life support systems supply pressurisation of the cabin, along with air, water, and warmth, to support the crew for a maximum of 40 days, although may have been potentially extendable to enable 90 day missions. Hermes could have operated autonomously for up to one month, and would be able to remain docked with an orbiting space station for a maximum of 90 days.

According to CNES, Hermes would have been subject to more extreme re-entry conditions than the Space Shuttle due to its smaller size exposing the vehicle to higher aerothermal pressures. The baseline thermal protection, was to withstand temperatures of 1,400-1,600 °C for a minimum of 20 minutes and studied by Dassault and SEP, would have consisted of carbon elements with an anti-oxidant coating applied to portions of the nose and leading edges of the wings, while thermal tiles were to have covered the underside of the wing and fuselage. These tiles would have employed thin, reinforced ceramic-carbon honeycomb composite insulating layers separated by thin sheets of metal alloy to reflect the heat; an alternative concept for the tiles would have employed higher metallic portions in place of ceramics. The upper surfaces of the vehicle would have been subject to less heat than the lower surfaces, and used flexible blanket-like low-density, glassfibre-ceramic layers.

The shape of Hermes had been effectively frozen by November 1985. It was refined by subsonic wind tunnel testing in the Onera, constrained by the requirements of subsonic flight. In order to gather valuable data in the face of Europe's lack of experience, Dassault proposed validating the aerodynamic properties of the vehicle by completing a 1.4-tonne, 1-scale aerothermal demonstrator, named Maia, to be launched by an Ariane 4 for re-entry studies.

=== Mission profiles and infrastructure ===
Four typical missions were projected for Hermes:

- Hosting onboard experiments while in an equatorial 800 km (500 mi) altitude orbit
- Flights to NASA's space station Freedom at a 28.5° inclination orbit
- Flights to ESA's space station Columbus at a 60° orbit.
- Flights to ESA's uncrewed remote sensing Polar Platform at a 98° 500 km (310 mi) orbit

After each mission, Hermes would be refurbished at a dedicated facility in Europe. Around 40 days prior to a launch date, the vehicle would be transported on a specially-modified Airbus A300 airliner to its launch site in Kourou, French Guiana, where it would be integrated with its payload and installed atop an Ariane 5 rocket prior to being transferred to the launch pad. Mission control was to be based at Toulouse, France. During a typical mission, communications and tracking would have been performed by a planned European network of data relay satellites with coverage across 75% of a Hermes mission at a 28.5° orbit at an altitude of 400 km (250 mi).

Following a mission, Hermes would land at Istres-Le Tubé Air Base near Istres. Other potential landing sites were mooted, including Guiana Space Centre, Martinique Aimé Césaire International Airport on the island of Fort de France and unspecified airstrips in Bermuda. In the event of an aborted launch during the first 84 seconds, Hermes would be able to return to Kourou. A later abort would likely necessitate a water landing in the Atlantic Ocean, after which the vehicle would need to be retrieved by a recovery ship. Other emergency landing strips were to be designated, dependent upon the specifics of each mission.

== Mockups and models ==
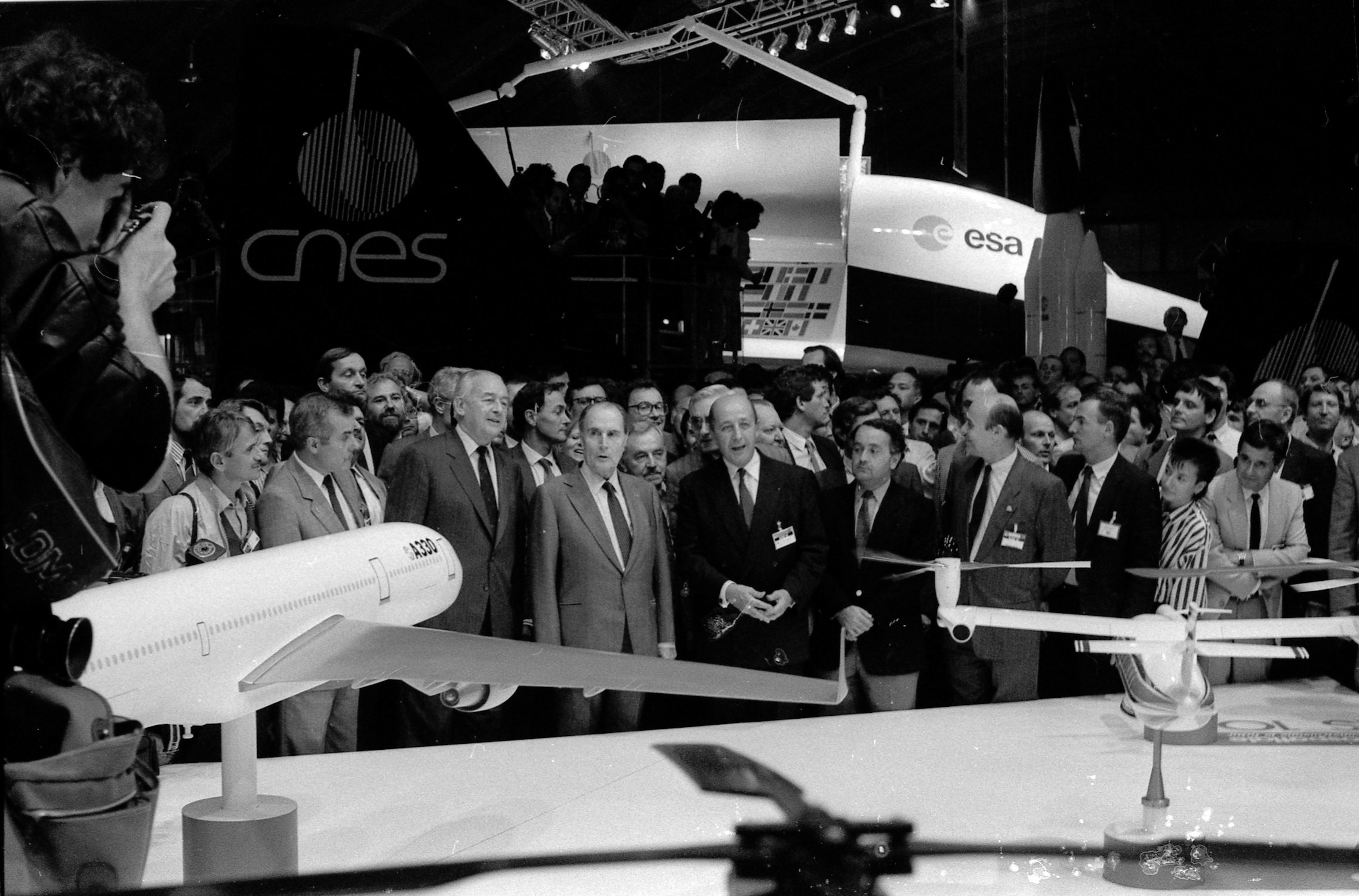
Hermes mockup behind French president Mitterrand. Photo taken at Toulouse in 1987.

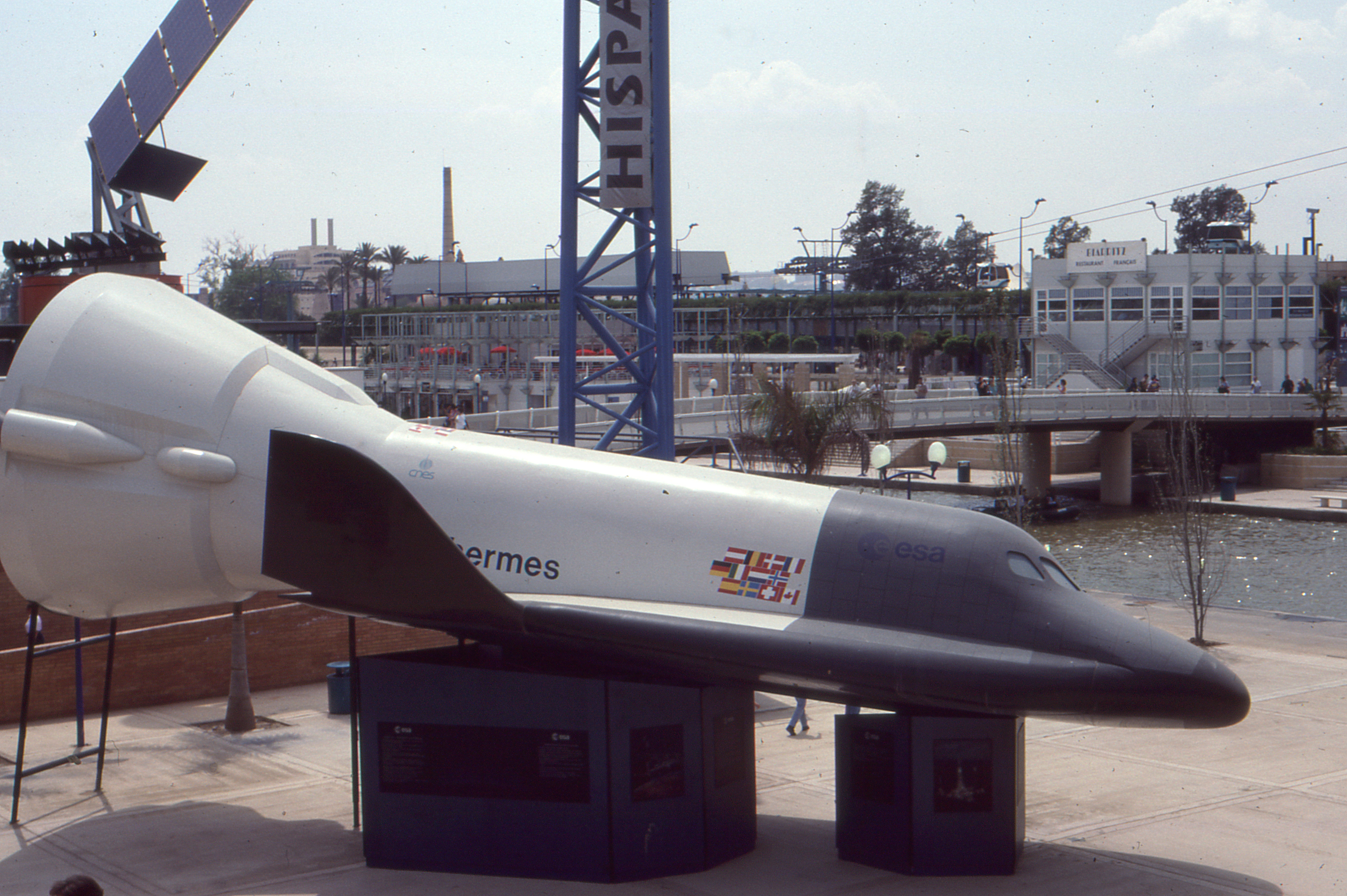
Hermes mockup on display during the Sevilla Expo 92

A full-scale mockup was built in 1986, and was shown in 1987 at Le Bourget in May, followed by Madrid in September and Toulouse during October - November. In 1988 the mockup was shown at Strasbourg in Abril, Hanover in May, and Bordeaux in December. With the end of the project in 1993, this mockup was transferred to ENSICA (École nationale supérieures d'ingénieurs de construction aéronautique) in 1996. In 2005 it was brought to Le Bourget to await a possible restoration project.

A 1/7 scale model built by EADS has been on display since 2002 at the Bordeaux–Mérignac Airport.

== In media ==
- A 1994 The Simpsons episode called "Deep Space Homer" features a Hermes inspired shuttle design.
- The 2015 film The Martian features a ship named Hermes, although the design is radically different from the shuttle design in real life, and is designed for interplanetary travel.
- The 2017 film Valerian and the City of a Thousand Planets's novelization mentions Hermes as the shuttle used by ESA during its first expedition to the International Space Station (identified as "Alpha").

== See also ==
- Hopper – 1990s European proposal of a robotic spaceplane
- Intermediate eXperimental Vehicle – ESA re-entry vehicle prototype
- SOAR – 2015 Swiss spaceplane concept based on the Hermes design
- Dream Chaser – US reusable automated cargo lifting-body spaceplane
