= SOAR (spaceplane) =

2015 Swiss spaceplane concept based on the Hermes design

- SOAR spaceplane rendering with Airbus A300
- Function: Autonomous suborbital launch and landing
- Manufacturer: Swiss Space Systems

Size
- Stages: Air-launched, one as fully reusable spacecraft or two as partially reusable spacecraft

Boosters
- Engines: NK-39

SOAR (Sub-Orbital Re-Usable Aircraft) was a planned partially reusable air-launched spaceplane launch system concept which would launch small satellites on a suborbital or orbital trajectory. The vehicle, derived from the Hermes spacecraft developed by the European Space Agency, was planned to be built, launched, and operated by Swiss Space Systems. The spaceplane was planned to launch from an Airbus A300 aircraft named S3 Zero Gravity Airliner. Once at altitude, the spaceplane would have separated from the aircraft and ignited an NK-39 engine developed by the Russian Federal Space Agency. After fuel depletion at about 80 kilometers altitude, the plane would release its payload before gliding back and landing on Earth.

The launch vehicle was planned to also have low Earth orbit capability when launched in conjunction with an expendable upper stage. Swiss Space Systems contracted the Russian firm RKK Energia to develop the upper stage. With an upper stage, the spacecraft was planned to be able to launch a 250-kilogram payload into orbit.

Swiss Space Systems claimed that the spaceplane could cost about one fourth as much as current suborbital launch costs. The spaceplane was targeted to have its first test launch by 2017. Following financial trouble, the company was declared bankrupt in a Swiss civil court, ending its operations.

== Development ==
Swiss Space Systems announced in 2015 that the airplane was planned to begin test flights in 2016. By early 2016 the company planned to begin drop testing of the spaceplane, which would include dropping a scaled-down boilerplate spacecraft which would autonomously land on a runway. In September 2014, test firings of the engine were expected to begin in late 2015.

The company partnered with Bauman Moscow State Technical University in 2013. According to Explore Deep Space, this partnership was planned to "enable the exchange of academicals between Russia and Switzerland".

== Missions ==
=== Formerly planned ===
- CleanSpace One, a 30 kilogram satellite designed to demonstrate technologies for space junk removal.

=== Completed ===
No missions of the spaceplane were completed.

== Future plans ==
=== Human spaceflight ===
In 2013, Swiss Space Systems declared their intention to eventually upgrade the spaceplane for human spaceflight. The company also announced a partnership with Thales Alenia Space for the design and construction of a pressurized compartment for the spaceplane's occupants. The company announced its intention to use a derivative of SOAR as a new high-speed passenger transport system instead of a space tourism vehicle. According to Pascal Jaussi, CEO of the corporation, "Far from wishing to launch into the space tourism market, we want rather to establish a new mode of air travel based on our satellite launch model that was planned to allow spaceports on different continents to be reached in an hour."

=== Expansion ===
The company created multiple subsidiaries to support a network of launch and landing sites, with locations in the United States, United Arab Emirates, and Croatia.

A subsidiary of the company, S3 USA Operations Inc, was formed in early 2014. The company planned to use the retired Space Shuttle landing site at Kennedy Space Center for the operation of SOAR.

In 2015, Swiss Space Systems announced a partnership with the financial institution D&B Group to create a joint subsidiary named S3 Middle East. This partnership, according to Satellite Today, was planned to allow the company to attempt SOAR launch certification in the United Arab Emirates. In March 2016, Amin Forati opened a bank guarantee of US$30 million in favour of S3 through his company D&B Groups, but such a large sum failed to save S3 from bankruptcy. Forati in September fled Dubai and in November two criminal cases for fraud were opened in UAE against him.
