= Scaled Composites Stratolaunch =

Mother ship aircraft designed to launch spacecraft

Stratolaunch
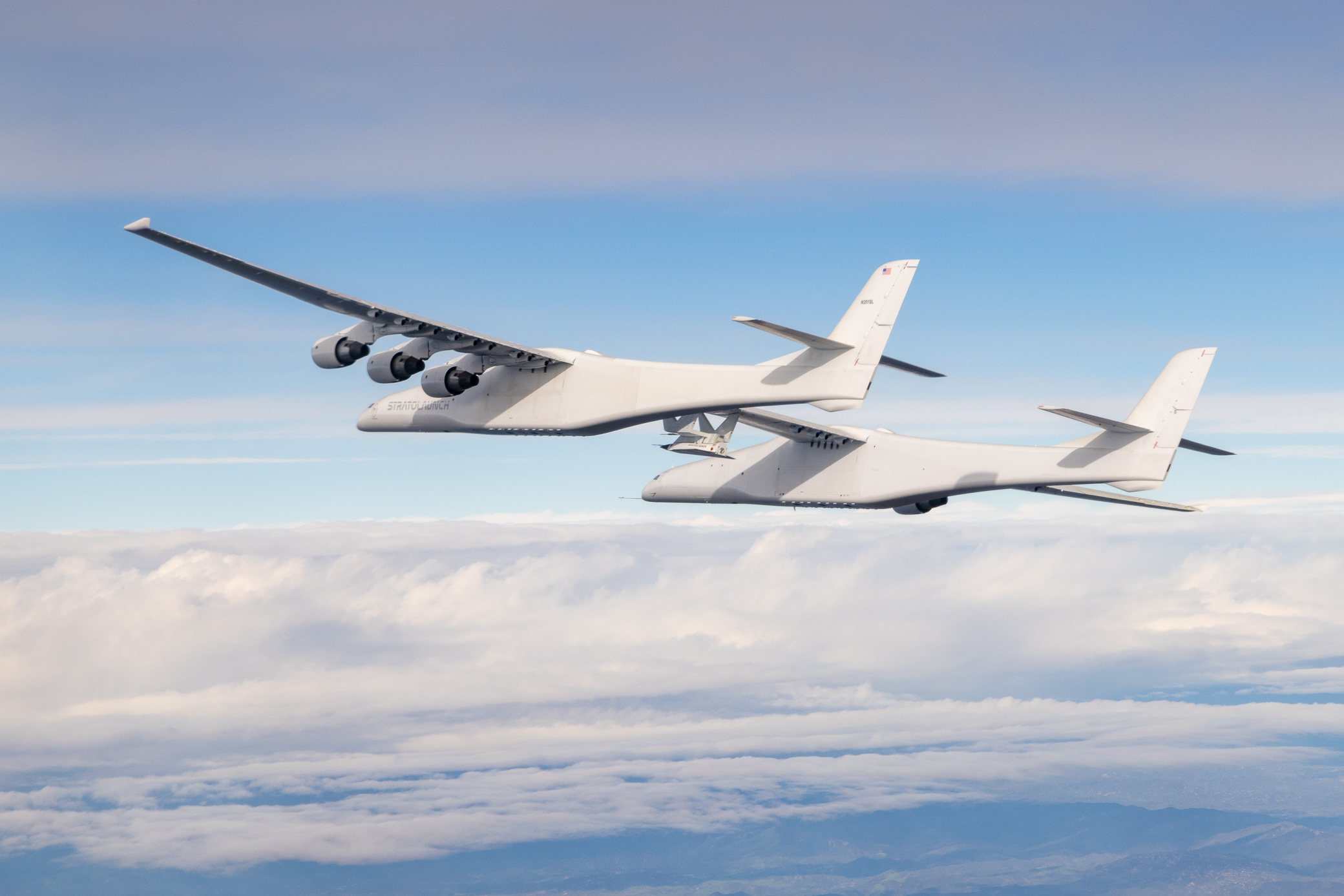
- Roc carrying the Talon-A hypersonic testbed

General information
- Other name: Roc
- Type: Mother ship aircraft
- National origin: United States
- Manufacturer: Scaled Composites
- Status: In service
- Primary user: Stratolaunch Systems
- Number built: 1
- Registration: N351SL
- Flights: 25

History
- First flight: April 13, 2019

The Scaled Composites Model 351 Stratolaunch, or "Roc", is a solitary testbed aircraft built by Scaled Composites for Stratolaunch Systems to carry air-launch-to-orbit (ALTO) rockets, and subsequently repurposed to offer air launch hypersonic flight testing after a change of ownership. It was announced in December 2011, rolled out in May 2017, and flew for the first time on April 13, 2019, shortly after the death of founder Paul Allen. The aircraft features a twin-fuselage design and the longest wingspan ever flown, at 385 feet (117 m), surpassing the Hughes H-4 Hercules "Spruce Goose" flying boat of 321 feet (98 m). The Stratolaunch is intended to carry a 550,000-pound (250 t) payload and has a 1,300,000-pound (590 t) maximum takeoff weight.

Stratolaunch ceased operations in May 2019, shortly after the first flight of the Roc, and placed all company assets, including the aircraft, for sale by June 2019. In October 2019, Cerberus Capital Management acquired Stratolaunch Systems, including the Stratolaunch aircraft. Stratolaunch announced in December 2019 that it would be focusing on offering high-speed flight test services.

== History ==
=== Early development ===
In early 2011, Dynetics began studying the project and had approximately 40 employees working on it at the December 2011 public announcement. Stratolaunch originally planned to airlaunch the Falcon 9 Air by SpaceX, whose efforts began shortly before December. Launching medium-sized payloads with the Falcon 9 dictated the aircraft size but SpaceX departed a year later.

In May 2012, its specially constructed hangar was being built at the Mojave Air and Space Port in Mojave, California. In October 2012, the first of two manufacturing buildings, an 88,000 sq ft (8,200 m^{2}) facility for construction of the composite sections of the wing and fuselage, was opened for production. Two Boeing 747s, formerly flown by United Airlines, were purchased to provide components for the vehicle with BAE Systems being engaged to dissasemble them. Janicki Industries was engaged to build 40% of the aerostructures of the vehicle including the empangage and tail.

In August 2013, the Pegasus II was selected for the air-launch vehicle. In August 2014, all-solid-fuel propulsion was selected, rather than liquid as for the Orbital Sciences launcher. In August 2015, 200,000 lb (91 t) of structure was assembled.

By June 2016, Scaled Composites had 300 people working on the project. Virgin Orbit also planned to launch small satellites with the LauncherOne from a 747. Orbital ATK dropped its Thunderbolt rocket project for medium-class payloads. In October 2016, the Pegasus II was replaced by multiple Pegasus XLs mounted underneath the carrier aircraft, developments of the original Pegasus rocket, which had been launched 42 times since 1990.

=== Testing ===
By May 1, 2017, Stratolaunch had already spent hundreds of millions of dollars on the project. On May 31, 2017, the aircraft was rolled out for fueling tests, and to be prepared for ground testing, engine runs, taxi tests, and ultimately, first flight. The company stated that it was aiming for a 2019 first-launch demonstration. The Register newspaper in 2017 reported that Stratolaunch may have competition from the DARPA XS-1 or from Vector Space Systems by 2019. By September 2017, engine testing was underway as well as testing of "control surfaces and electric, pneumatic and fire detection systems." In December 2017, its first low-speed taxi test took it to 25 knots (29 mph; 46 km/h) on the runway, powered by its six turbofans, to test its steering, braking, and telemetry. Higher-speed taxi tests began in 2018, reaching 40 knots (46 mph; 74 km/h) in February, and 78 knots (90 mph; 144 km/h) in October. On January 9, 2019, Stratolaunch completed a 110 knots (130 mph; 200 km/h) taxi test, and released a photograph of the nose landing gear lifted off the ground during the test.

In January 2019, three months after the death of Stratolaunch founder and Microsoft co-founder Paul Allen, Stratolaunch abandoned the development of its PGA rocket engines and dedicated launchers. This left the Northrop Grumman Pegasus XL as the sole launch option for an orbital capability of 800 lb (360 kg). Stratolaunch was then reported to be aiming for a first flight within a few weeks and a first launch from the carrier in 2020.

The aircraft first flew on April 13, 2019, at the Mojave Air and Space Port, reaching 17,000 feet (5,200 m) and speed of 165 knots (190 mph; 306 km/h) in a 2-hour-29-minute flight.

=== Development halt and sale ===
The future of Stratolaunch had been in doubt since the death of company founder Paul Allen in October 2018, with speculation that Stratolaunch Systems could cease operations. Allen had been the source of funds for the capital-intensive development program since the project began in 2010, and the company founding in 2011.

In January 2019, Stratolaunch announced it was halting development of its air-launched family of launch vehicles.

On May 31, 2019, the company announced that it would cease operations and that sale of its assets was being explored. An asking price of US$400 million was reported, which would include the sole aircraft, the company facilities, equipment, the designs and other intellectual property. In June 2019 the Stratolaunch Systems company and assets were put up for sale by Vulcan for $400 million.

By October 11, Stratolaunch announced it had new ownership and that it would continue regular operations, but did not disclose the identity of the investors. In December, the new owner was revealed to be Cerberus Capital Management, a specialist in the acquisition of distressed companies. After the acquisition, Stratolaunch is now focusing on offering high-speed flight test services.

=== Post-ownership changes ===
By early 2020, Stratolaunch was developing the Talon-A reusable, rocket-powered, hypersonic flight vehicle (the Vulcan Aerospace Hyper-A concept in 2018), intended to reach Mach 5–7 after launch. Single Talon-A launch flights were planned for 2022, with an ambitious target to carry up to three hypersonic vehicles at once the following year. Larger concept vehicles, the Talon-Z and Black Ice, could carry cargo or people to orbit.

The Stratolaunch made its second flight on April 29, 2021. Its third flight took place on January 16, 2022, from Mojave Air and Space Port; the flight lasted 4 hours 23 minutes and reached altitude of 23,490 feet (7,160 m) and a top speed of 330 km/h (180 kn; 210 mph). It made its fourth flight on February 24, 2022.

On October 28, 2022, flight eight was the first captive carry flight with the Talon-A separation test vehicle, TA-0.

On January 13, 2023, flight nine achieved the longest duration yet, over six hours. Data on aerodynamic loads and interactions between the two vehicles were collected during this test. By April 1 2023, flight ten marked the start of routine operations.

On March 5, 2024, the Stratolaunch released the Talon-A hypersonic vehicle at an altitude of about 35,000 feet (11,000 m).

== Design ==
Stratolaunch compared with other large airplanes

Stratolaunch has a twin-fuselage configuration, each 238 ft (73 m) long and supported by 12 main landing gear wheels and two nose gear wheels, for a total of 28 wheels. The twin-fuselage configuration is similar to the Scaled Composites White Knight Two. Each fuselage has its own empennage.

The pilot, copilot, and flight engineer are accommodated in the right fuselage cockpit. The flight data systems are in the left fuselage. The left fuselage cockpit is unmanned with storage space for up to 2,500 lb of mission-specific support equipment. Both fuselage cockpits are pressurized and separated by a composite pressure bulkhead from the remainder of the unpressurized vehicle.

At 385 ft (117 m), it is the largest plane by wingspan, significantly larger than the 300 ft (91 m) of an American football field. The main center section is made up of four primary composite spars supported by four secondary spars. The center section of the high-mounted, high aspect ratio wing is fitted with a Mating and Integration System (MIS), developed by Dynetics and capable of handling a 490,000 lb (220 t) load. The wing houses six main and two auxiliary fuel tanks, with the main tanks located inboard adjacent to an engine. The auxiliary tanks are located in the inboard wing where the load-carrying structure joins the fuselage.

Stratolaunch is powered by six Pratt & Whitney PW4056 engines positioned on pylons outboard of each fuselage, providing 56,750 lbf (252.4 kN) of thrust per engine. Many of the aircraft systems have been adopted from the Boeing 747-400, including the engines, avionics, flight deck, landing gear and other systems, reducing development costs.

The flight controls include 12 cable-driven ailerons powered by hydraulic actuators, split rudders, and horizontal stabilizers on twin tail units. The wing has 14 electrically signaled, hydraulically actuated trailing-edge split flaps that also act as speed brakes. The hydraulic system and actuators, electrical system, avionics, pilot controls, and flight deck are from donor B747-400s. Approximately 250,000 lb of the aircraft's empty weight of 500,000 lb is from B747-400 components.

The aircraft requires 12,000 ft (3,700 m) of runway for takeoff. Payload separation was originally planned at 35,000 ft (11,000 m). A payload of 550,000 lb (250 t) can be flown. Carrying a Pegasus II, it could originally deliver up to 13,500 lb (6.1 t) satellites to LEO or 4,500 lb (2.0 t) to a 15° GTO. Launch of a Dream Chaser small spaceplane capable of transporting astronauts or payloads within 24 hours was also proposed. A subsequent goal was to carry up to three Orbital ATK "Pegasus XL" rockets for high-altitude launches by 2022, before the retargeting to hypersonic flight.

Within Scaled Composites, its model number is M351. It is nicknamed "Roc" after the mythical bird, said to be large enough to carry an elephant.

== Specifications (Model 351 Stratolaunch) ==
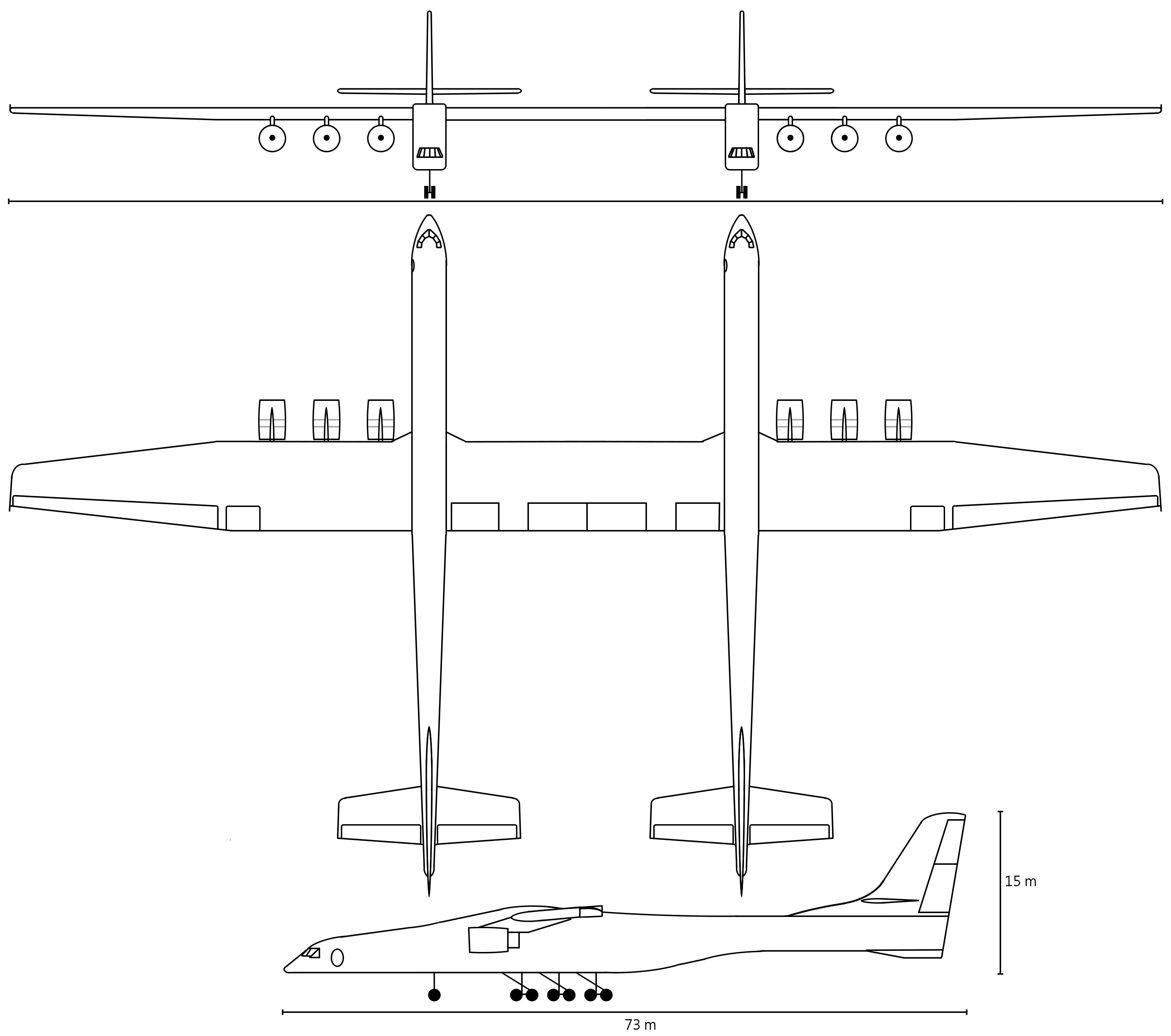
Drawing lines

General characteristics

- Length: 238 ft (73 m)
- Wingspan: 385 ft (117 m)
- Height: 50 ft (15 m)
- Empty weight: 500,000 lb (226,796 kg)
- Gross weight: 750,000 lb (340,194 kg) with no external payload
- Max takeoff weight: 1,300,000 lb (589,670 kg)
- External payload: 550,000 lb (250,000 kg)
- Center wing length: 95 ft (29 m)
- Height under center wing: 24 ft (7.3 m)
- Distance between fuselage (and quadricycle landing gear) center lines: 106 ft (32 m)
- Powerplant: 6 × Pratt & Whitney PW4056 turbofan, 56,750 lbf (252.4 kN) thrust each

Performance

- Maximum speed: 460 kn (530 mph, 850 km/h)
- Range: 1,000 nmi (1,200 mi, 1,900 km) radius
- Ferry range: 2,500 nmi (2,900 mi, 4,600 km)
- Service ceiling: 35,000 ft (11,000 m) with payload

== See also ==
- Airborne aircraft carrier
- Air-launched ballistic missile

Related development

- Pegasus rocket
- Scaled Composites Proteus
- Scaled Composites White Knight

Aircraft of comparable role, configuration, and era

- Conroy Virtus
- Stargazer

Related lists

- List of large aircraft
