= Air-launch-to-orbit =

Method of launching rockets

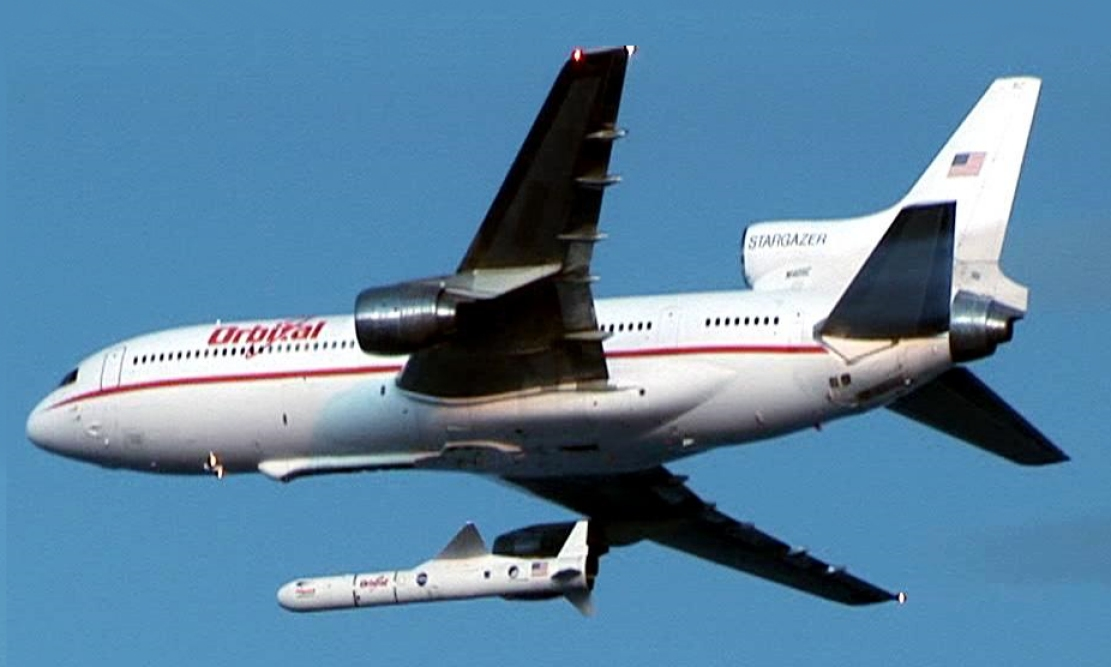
Orbital's Stargazer launches Pegasus carrying the three Space Technology 5 satellites in the skies of California, 2006.

Air-launch-to-orbit (ALTO) is the method of launching smaller rockets at altitude from a heavier conventional horizontal-takeoff aircraft, to carry satellites to low Earth orbit. It is a follow-on development of air launches of experimental aircraft that began in the late 1940s. This method, when employed for payload orbital insertion, presents significant advantages over conventional vertical rocket launches, particularly because of the reduced mass, thrust, cost of the rocket, geographical factors, and natural disasters.

Air launching has also been developed for sub-orbital spaceflight. In 2004 the Ansari X Prize $10 Million purse was won by a team led by Burt Rutan's Scaled Composites, launching the SpaceShipOne from the purpose-built White Knight carrier aircraft.

The first air-launch-to-space (not to orbit) occurred on 18 July 1958, with a test launch of the Bold Orion air-launched ICBM from a B-47 Stratojet carrier mothership. The first air-launch-to-orbit took place on 5 April 1990, with a Northrop Grumman Pegasus rocket carried by a NASA B-52.

== Advantages ==
The principal advantage of a rocket being launched by a high-flying airplane is that it need not fly through the lower, denser atmosphere, whose drag requires a considerable amount of extra work to overcome. Higher densities at lower altitudes result in larger drag forces acting on the vehicle. In addition, thrust is lost due to over-expansion of the exhaust at high ambient pressure and under-expansion at low ambient pressure; a fixed nozzle geometry cannot provide optimal exhaust expansion over the full range of ambient pressure, and represents a compromise solution. Rockets launched from high altitude can be optimized for lower ambient pressure, thus achieving greater thrust over the entire operating regime.

Propellant is conserved because the air-breathing carrier aircraft lifts the rocket to altitude much more efficiently. Airplane engines do not require on-board storage of an oxidizer, and they can use the surrounding air to produce thrust, such as with a turbofan. This allows the launch system to conserve a significant amount of mass that would otherwise be reserved for fuel, reducing the overall size. A larger fraction of the rocket mass can then include payload, reducing payload launch costs.

Air-launch-to-orbit offers the potential for aircraft-like operations such as launch-on-demand, and is also less subject to launch-constraining weather. This allows the aircraft to fly around weather conditions as well as fly to better launch points, and to launch a payload into any orbital inclination at any time. Insurance costs are reduced as well, because launches occur well away from land, and there is no need for a launch pad or blockhouse.

Air-launch-to-orbit also works well as part of a combination launch system such as a reusable air-launched single-stage-to-skyhook launch vehicle powered by a rocket or jet engine.

An additional benefit of air-launch-to-orbit is a reduced delta-v needed to achieve orbit. This results in a greater payload to fuel ratio which reduces the cost per kilogram to orbit. To further leverage the delta-v advantage, supersonic air-launch-to-orbit has been proposed.

Air-launch-to-orbit also serves as alternative if conditions do not allow launching a rocket vertically from ground to orbit due to certain reasons, such as natural disasters (earthquakes, tsunamis, floods and volcanic eruptions).

== Disadvantages ==
According to Aviation Week and Space Technology, air-launch-to-orbit is limited by aircraft size. Additionally, airplanes may generate large lateral forces which could damage payloads.

== Air launch systems ==
=== Retired ===
- Northrop Grumman (originally Orbital Sciences, then Orbital ATK, since 2018 Northrop) Pegasus (July 2026)
- ASM-135 ASAT (anti-satellite system)
- NOTS-EV-1 Pilot
- Virgin Orbit LauncherOne

=== Under development ===
- Aevum Ravn X
- CubeCab
- Generation Orbit Launch Services - contracted for NASA NEXT
- NASA Armstrong Flight Research Center Towed Glider Air-Launch System
- CDTI, CNES, DLR Aldebaran (rocket)
- Orbit Boy microsatellite air-launch system
- HAX25, project of the Italian National Research Council, first tested in 2026

=== Proposed ===
- Vulcan Aerospace 75-percent-scaled Dream Chaser crew-carrying spaceplane with rocket by Orbital Sciences
- Antonov, Aerospace Industry Corporation of China Antonov An-225 Mriya
- OREL (proposed by Ukraine)
- Sura (proposed by Ukraine)

=== Abandoned projects ===
- DARPA ALASA
- AirLaunch LLC
- MAKS
- Stratolaunch
- Ishim
- Svityaz
- Orbital Sciences Pegasus II – contracted design/build for Stratolaunch Systems
- Swiss Space Systems SOAR
- XCOR Aerospace Lynx Mark III
- Falcon 9 Air Developed 2011-2012, In partnership between SpaceX and Stratolaunch systems

== See also ==
- NOTS-EV-1 Pilot
- NOTS-EV-2 Caleb
- Buoyant space port
- Rockoon
- Launch vehicle types by launch platform
- Black Horse (rocket)
- Rocketplane XS
