= Swiss Space Systems =

Aerospace company in Switzerland

Swiss Space Systems Holding SA
- Industry: Aerospace
- Founded: 2012
- Founder: Pascal Jaussi
- Headquarters: Payerne, Switzerland
- Key people: Pascal Jaussi (CEO); Claude Nicollier (Chairman)
- Products: Satellite launch/Space tourism
- Website: http://www.s-3.ch/en/home (Archived)

Swiss Space Systems (S3) was a company that planned to provide orbital launches of small satellites and crewed sub-orbital spaceflights. The company was based in Payerne in western Switzerland, near Payerne Air Base, where it planned to build a spaceport in 2015. Suborbital spaceplanes were to be launched from an Airbus A300, giving the spacecraft more initial speed and altitude than if it were launched from the ground. The spacecraft, in turn, would release a disposable third stage.

As of March 2013, the company planned to charge CHF 10 million (US$10.5 million) per launch, using uncrewed suborbital spaceplanes that could carry satellites weighing up to 250 kilograms (550 lb). Costs were expected to be reduced by the reusable nature of the spaceplane and launch facilities, and by lower fuel consumption than conventional systems.

In 2013, S3 also hoped to develop a crewed version of its suborbital spaceplane to provide supersonic intercontinental flights to paying customers. According to CEO Pascal Jaussi: "Far from wishing to launch into the space tourism market, we want rather to establish a new mode of air travel based on our satellite launch model that will allow spaceports on different continents to be reached in an hour."

As of March 2013, project partners included the European Space Agency, Dassault Aviation and the von Karman Institute for Fluid Dynamics.

According to Swiss public broadcasting, Swiss Space Systems became heavily indebted. In 2016, Swiss Space Systems asked to delay bankruptcy procedures as new funds from Singapore bank Axios Credit were expected. However, news tabloid Blick reported that Singapore authorities declared that Axios is not a licensed bank. On 14 December 2016, Swiss Space Systems was declared bankrupt in the civil court of Broye and North Vaud.

== History ==
S3 was founded in 2012 by Pascal Jaussi, a pilot and engineer, and joined by astronaut Claude Nicollier. The inauguration was held on 13 March 2013 at Payerne Airport. Initial plans called for the company to open its first spaceport by 2015 and begin test launches by 2015 (Airbus) and 2017 (shuttle). More spaceports were planned for Malaysia, Morocco and North America.

== S3 Suborbital spaceplane ==
2013 plans called for S3 to develop a suborbital spaceplane named SOAR that would launch a microsat launch vehicle capable of putting a payload of up to 250 kilograms (550 lb) into low Earth orbit. As of October 2013, "S3 hopes to achieve horizontal launch with its small satellite deployment system by 2018". In July 2014, S3 announced a partnership with North Bay, Ontario, Canada and Canadore College to start drop-test flights of a scale version of the SOAR spaceplane at Jack Garland Airport (CYYB).

In addition to crewed sub-orbital spaceflights, SOAR would also enable high-speed commercial flights (over Mach 3), allowing, for instance, passengers to reach Sydney from Geneva in only a few hours.

=== Future launch projections ===
The first launch was scheduled for 2018, with CleanSpace One as payload.

== S3 Spaceport ==
In October 2013, Swiss Space Systems signed a memorandum of understanding with Spaceport Colorado in the US to allow the spaceport to be a Swiss Space Systems' potential future North American launch site. In March 2014, a subsidiary was opened at the Kennedy Space Center to allow Swiss Space Systems to use the Shuttle Landing Facility (SLF) for its operations.

Gran Canaria (Canary Islands, Spain) was to be the first European operations center as S3 planned to launch satellites from there in 2018.

== S3 Zero G ==
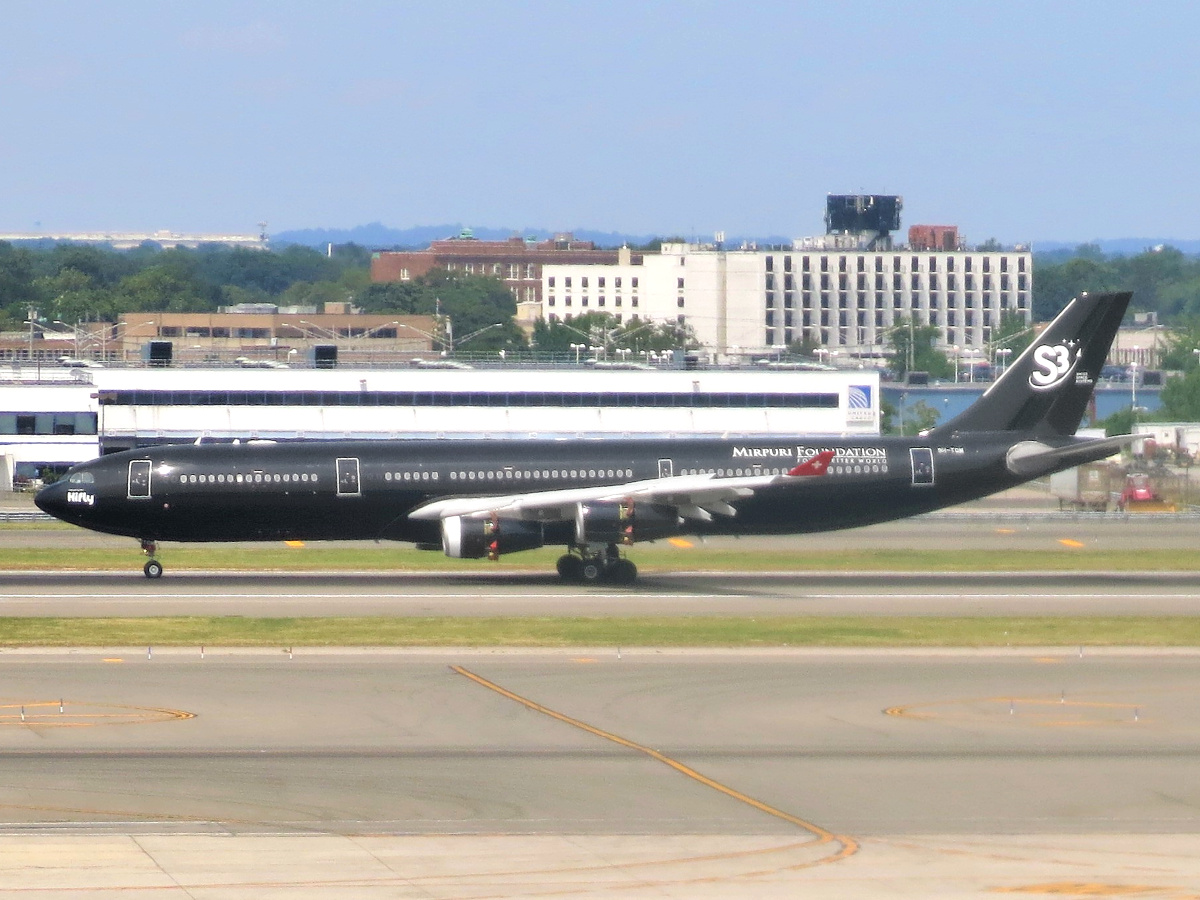
Company's designed reduced-gravity aircraft planned for operation by Hi Fly Malta, painted in S3 livery

S3 ZeroG was a part of Swiss Space Systems Holding SA, which offered flights in reduced gravity aircraft, a modified Airbus A300. Each flight included 15 parabolas during which the aircraft dives at a 45° angle from 10,400 to 7,300 m (34,000 to 24,000 ft), giving 20–25 seconds of microgravity on board. S3 ZeroG aircraft were scheduled to travel to different countries around the world, starting in Switzerland during the second half of 2015. At the end of 2016, the company announced the first parabolic flights in January 2017; however, according to astronaut Claude Nicollier, President of the Committee of Experts of Swiss Space Systems, "It is absolutely impossible, it needs an official authorization and it will take months, if not years".

== CEO attacked ==
Swiss newspapers reported the company to be heavily indebted. In 2015 and 2016, bailiffs collected between 3 and 4 million Swiss francs. The company's creditworthiness was deemed low.

On August 26, 2016, Pascal Jaussi was abducted by unknown assailants, beaten, showered with a flammable liquid, and badly burned. In January 2017, it was reported that Jaussi might have staged the attack to save his bankrupt company.

== See also ==
- Air launch to orbit
- Comparison of orbital launchers families
- Comparison of orbital launch systems
- Pegasus (rocket), a similar concept.
