= Pegasus II (rocket) =

Air-launched orbital rocket

Pegasus II, also known as Thunderbolt, was an air-launched orbital rocket under development in 2012–2015 by Orbital Sciences Corporation for use by Stratolaunch Systems.

The vehicle was to be carried by the Stratolaunch aircraft, developed by Scaled Composites, which is the world's largest aircraft by wingspan. Originally designed with solid lower stages and a cryogenic upper stage, the Pegasus II design was subsequently modified in 2014 to exclusively use solid rocket motors.

However, the failure of the design to meet the economic cost and revenue targets led to the design being "shelved" by Stratolaunch in May 2015. At the time, Stratolaunch "reopened the design plan and [was] evaluating over 70 different launch vehicle variants" for use on the Scaled Composites Stratolaunch. In the end, no good economic case ever closed and Stratolaunch halted all work on their own family of air-launched rockets in January 2019.

== History ==
Stratolaunch Systems announced plans for its air-launched orbital rocket system in December 2011. Funding would be provided by Vulcan, an investment company created and chaired by Microsoft co-founder Paul G. Allen. The launch system would consist of three primary components: a carrier aircraft, contracted to Scaled Composites; a launch vehicle, originally contracted to SpaceX as a derivative of the Falcon 9—later contracted to Orbital Sciences as the Pegasus II; and a mating and integration system to enable the aircraft to safely interface with, carry, and release the booster, contracted to Dynetics.

The Falcon 9 Air was to be powered by four Merlin 1D engines in its first stage, and would deliver up to 6,100 kg (13,400 pounds) into low Earth orbit (LEO) or 2,300 kg (5,100 pounds) to geosynchronous transfer orbit (GTO). As development progressed, the scope of alterations to the Falcon 9, including significant structural modifications to the first stage for aerodynamic surfaces, and the disruption to manufacturing processes these modifications would have required, led Stratolaunch and SpaceX to part ways and cease development of the Falcon 9 Air.

Stratolaunch then engaged Orbital Sciences Corporation (Orbital) to develop the Pegasus II. Orbital received a study contract in November 2012, and a full vehicle development contract in 2013. The rocket consists of two solid stages produced by Alliant Techsystems (ATK) and, as originally designed, a cryogenic third stage. In 2014, the cryogenic stage was replaced by two additional solid rocket stages.

In February 2015, Orbital Sciences Corporation merged with Alliant Techsystems to create Orbital ATK Inc.

In April 2015, Stratolaunch announced that they are considering options for multiple launch vehicle options to be used with Stratolaunch over a range of satellite sizes, and that some development work on the Orbital launch vehicle has been slowed down.

However, by May 2015, since the evaluation of the Orbital solid-rocket launch vehicle economic case was not achieving revenue targets, Stratolaunch had "shelved" the Pegasus II option and "reopened the design plan and [was] evaluating over 70 different launch vehicle variants." Several years later, Stratolaunch halted development of its own air-launched family of launch vehicles in January 2019, and the behemoth aircraft was left with no specific plan for any use as a carrier aircraft for large air-launched launch vehicles.

== Design ==
The Stratolaunch carrier aircraft was planned to be able to take-off from airfields with a runway at least 3,700 m (12,100 feet) in length and travel up to 2,200 km (1,200 nautical miles) before releasing the Pegasus II at an altitude of 9,100 m (30,000 feet). The system will be the largest aircraft ever built in terms of wingspan; with the first test flight of the carrier aircraft originally expected in 2015 from Scaled Composites' facilities in Mojave, California, and the first test launch of the rocket not expected before 2016.

The first two stages of the Pegasus II were to have had the same outside diameter as the Space Shuttle Solid Rocket Booster, but intended to be constructed using much lighter carbon-composite cases and contain a more energetic propellant mix. To provide guidance while in the atmosphere, the first stage was to have two wings and a V-tail, both with control surfaces. Both the first and second stage solid rocket motors intended to use a thrust vector control (TVC) system for attitude control in the thin upper atmosphere.

The third stage was originally intended to be a restartable cryogenic stage burning liquid hydrogen and liquid oxygen. Missions to LEO would have featured a 5 m (16 ft)-diameter payload fairing and two Aerojet Rocketdyne RL10 engines, with a payload capacity of 6,120 kg (13,500 lb). GTO missions would have used a 4 m (13 ft) meter fairing and a single RL10 engine, with a payload capacity of approximately 2,000 kilograms (4,500 lb). This vehicle would have had a gross weight of about 211,000 kg (465,000 pounds).

Development of the cryogenic third stage was halted in 2014, and ATK was asked to evaluate a replacement consisting of two solid stages. In November of that year, Stratolaunch clarified that they had modified the design and that Pegasus II was to have been an all-solid vehicle.

== See also ==
- Pegasus (rocket)
