= Columbus Man-Tended Free Flyer =

Defunct crewed space station program

Columbus MTFF
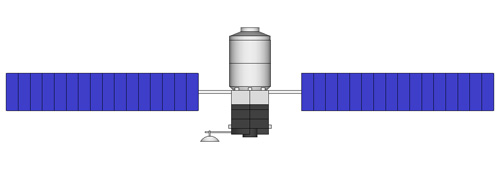
- Columbus MTFF station concept

Station statistics
- Crew: 3 (visiting from Hermes)
- Mission status: Cancelled
- Mass: 17,600 kg (38,800 lb)
- Length: 11.5 m (38 ft)
- Diameter: 4.4 m (14 ft)

The Columbus Man-Tended Free Flyer (MTFF) was a European Space Agency (ESA) program to develop a space station that could be used for a variety of microgravity experiments while serving ESA's needs for an autonomous crewed space platform. It consisted of a Columbus module docked to a service module containing solar power collectors, communications and other services. The program ran from 1986 to 1991, was expected to cost $3.56 billion including launch and utilization, and was cancelled while still in the planning stage. Aspects of the program were later realised in the Columbus science laboratory attached to the International Space Station (ISS).

== History ==
ESA's Board of Directors approved the Columbus program in 1985. Like the Multi-Purpose Logistics Modules (MPLMs) and the Automated Transfer Vehicle (ATV) resupply craft, Columbus traces its origins to Europe's Spacelab. The Columbus program was intended to supplement NASA's Space Station Freedom.

Initially the Columbus program included three flight configurations:

- A Man-tended Free-Flyer (MTFF), as a space station element
- An Attached Pressurized Module (APM), as a crewed space station component
- An uncrewed Polar Platform (PPF) for remote sensing and data return

The entire Columbus package (MTFF, APM, PPF) was expected to cost $3.56 billion including launch and utilization. The estimated costs of the MTFF alone were $160–180 million in 1986. The MTFF element would be serviced by the Hermes spaceplane launched atop the Ariane 5, flying periodically to the station for maintenance and reconfiguration. NASA approved the MTFF although it would require additional communications, docking facilities, data processing and other Station resources. Hermes would dock with the human-tended free-flyer to retrieve microgravity experiments.

Since the initial plans, numerous studies and proposals were made. For development cost saving and optimization of spares provisioning during the operational phase commonality was foreseen between the flight configurations and to the space station (e.g. same computers used for all three elements, video and comms units identical to station equipment). When the complete phase C/D proposal (fixed price) was delivered end 1989 by the prime contractor MBB-ERNO it turned out that the costs were much higher than expected by ESA. The Columbus budget was trimmed slightly by canceling the smaller $145-million Eureca B platform. Hermes and Columbus would receive final approval in 1991. By this time, the cost of German unification had forced Germany to demand a 15-20% reduction in ESA 1990-2000 spending and it was becoming increasingly clear either the German-led MTFF, Italian-led APM or French-led Hermes projects would have to be cancelled. After several budget cuts, the CNES-led Hermes program was cancelled and the polar platform was contracted separately with commonality to the French satellite Helios 2.

All that remained in the Columbus program was the APM, which was first renamed to "Columbus Orbital Facility" and later to just "Columbus". It was eventually redesigned to fit with the International Space Station (ISS).

When only the APM was left in ESA's Columbus program, there were not enough tasks for the two main contributors Germany and Italy represented by MBB-ERNO and Alenia respectively. As compromise the Pre Integrated Columbus APM (PICA) principle was invented meaning a split systems engineering responsibility where Alenia as a co-prime is responsible for the overall Columbus configuration, the mechanical and thermal/life support systems, HFE and harness design/manufacturing whereas EADS Astrium Space Transportation is responsible for the overall Columbus design and all Avionics systems including electrical harness design and software.

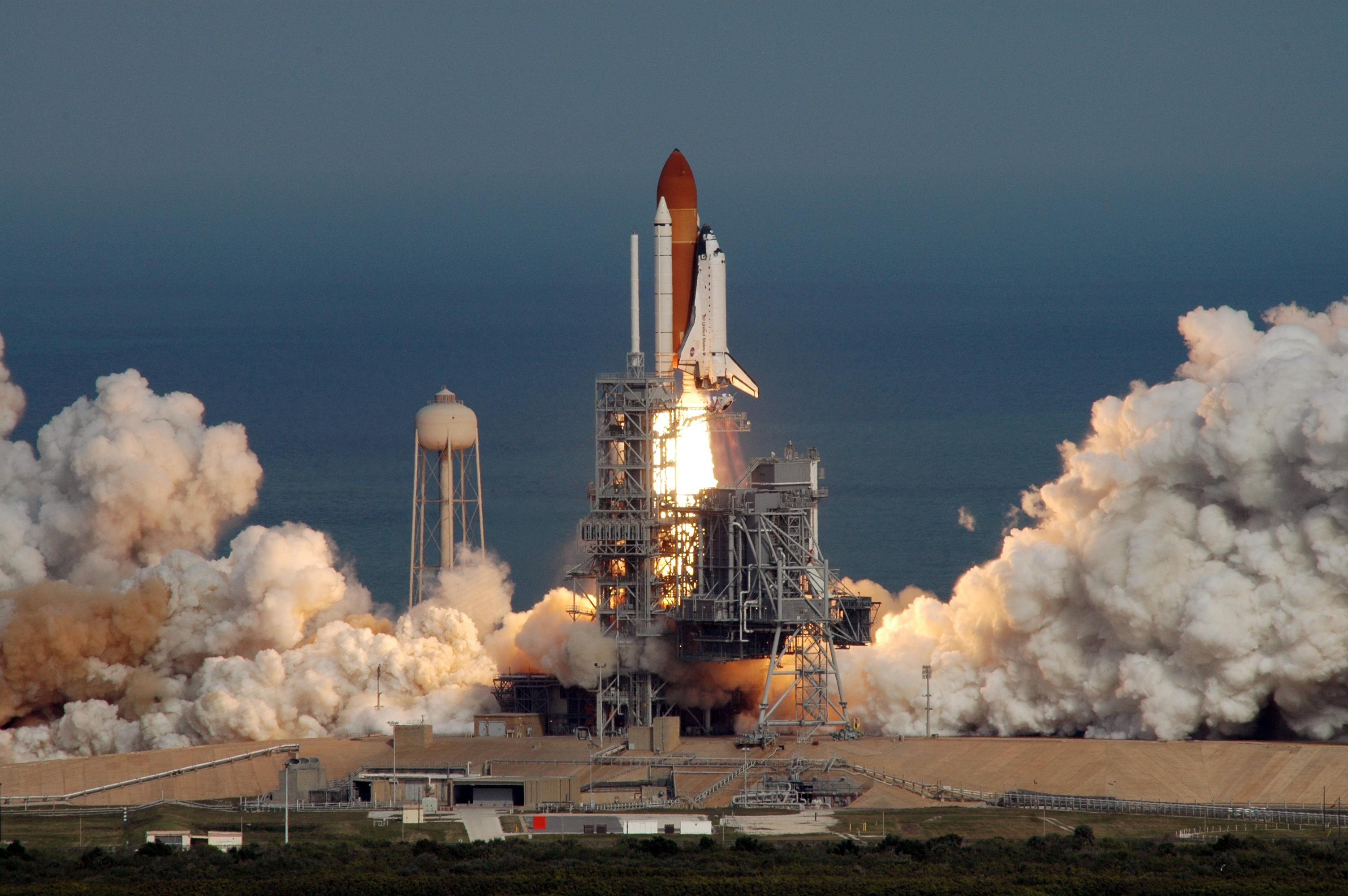
Columbus module launches aboard the Space Shuttle in 2008

ESA's Columbus module on the International Space Station (ISS) was based on the APM. It was launched aboard Space Shuttle Atlantis on February 7, 2008, on flight STS-122.
