= Cotton Fort =

Coordinates: 50°36′58″N 2°27′08″W

Cotton Fort was a small fortification in Melcombe, now part of the town of Weymouth, Dorset. No trace of the fort exists today.

== History ==
The fort was likely constructed during the reign of Henry VIII of England, although others suggest it may be Elizabethan. It took the form of a rampart, with three cannon mounted. It was constructed to the north of Melcombe, which these days is south of Weymouth railway station, but a lack of detail makes it impossible to trace the exact location.

== See also ==
- Block House (Melcombe)
- Nothe Fort
