= Blockhouse (disambiguation) =

A blockhouse is a small, isolated fort in the form of a single building.

Blockhouse or block house may also refer to:

== Buildings ==
- Blockhouse (Central Park), fort in New York City
- Blockhouse on Signal Mountain (Oklahoma), historic building at Fort Sill, Oklahoma
- Block House (Delaware), historic building in Claymont, Delaware
- Block House (Governors Island), historic building on Governors Island, New York
- Block House (Melcombe), old fort in Weymouth, Dorset
- Fort Pitt Block House, historic building in Point State Park, Pittsburgh
- Blockhaus d'Éperlecques, a Nazi bunker in France, built as a V-2 launch base
- Blockhouse for one or multiple launch pads (example Cape Canaveral Space Force Station#LC-23/24)

== Other ==
- Blockhouse, Nova Scotia
- Blockhouse, Washington
- Block House (restaurant), chain based in Hamburg
- The Blockhouse, 1973 film
