= SpaceX launch vehicles =

Launch vehicles developed and operated by SpaceX

Flown SpaceX launch vehicles to scale – from left to right, the Falcon 1, Falcon 9 v1.0, Falcon 9 v1.1, Falcon 9 Full Thrust, Falcon 9 Block 5, Falcon Heavy, Falcon Heavy Block 5, and Starship Block 1.

SpaceX manufactures launch vehicles to operate its launch provider services and to execute its various exploration goals. SpaceX manufactures and operates two members of the Falcon 9 family, the Falcon 9 Block 5, a medium-lift launch vehicle and the Falcon Heavy, a heavy-lift launch vehicle – both of which are powered by SpaceX Merlin engines and employ VTVL technologies to reuse the first stage. As of 2024, the company is also developing the fully reusable Starship launch system, which will replace Falcon 9, Falcon Heavy, and Dragon.

SpaceX's first launch vehicle, the Falcon 1, was the first privately developed liquid fueled launch vehicle to be launched into orbit, and used SpaceX's Merlin and Kestrel engines for its first and second stages, respectively. It was launched five times from Omelek Island between 2006 and 2009 – the Falcon 1e and Falcon 5 variants were planned but never developed. The Falcon 9 v1.0, using upgraded Merlin engines on both its stages, was developed as part of the United States Air Force's Evolved Expendable Launch Vehicle program and NASA's Commercial Orbital Transportation Services program. It was first launched from Cape Canaveral in 2010 and later replaced by the Falcon 9 v1.1 series in 2013, which was also launched from Vandenberg Air Force Base in California. The Falcon 9 Full Thrust and Falcon Heavy variants followed in 2015 and 2018. Falcon Heavy launches from Kennedy Space Center in Florida, and Falcon 9 additionally launches from Cape Canaveral Space Force Station in Florida and Vandenberg.

== Nomenclature ==
Elon Musk, CEO of SpaceX, has stated that the Falcon 1, 9, and Heavy are named after the Millennium Falcon from the Star Wars film series.

== Launch vehicles ==
=== Falcon 9 Block 5 ===
Falcon 9 Block 5 is a partially reusable, human-rated, two-stage-to-orbit, medium-lift launch vehicle (Note: If launched in expendable configuration, Falcon 9 has a theoretical payload capability of a heavy-lift launch vehicle) designed and manufactured in the United States by SpaceX. It is the fifth major version of the Falcon 9 family and the third version of the Falcon 9 Full Thrust. It is powered by Merlin 1D engines burning rocket-grade kerosene (RP-1) and liquid oxygen (LOX).

The main changes from Block 3 (the original Falcon 9 Full Thrust) to Block 5 are higher-thrust engines and improvements to the landing legs along with numerous other small changes to streamline recovery and re-use of first-stage boosters and fairing halves and increase the production rate. Each Block 5 booster is designed to fly ten times with only minor maintenance between launches and potentially up to 100 times with periodic refurbishment, while fairing halves have been recovered and reflown countless times.

In 2018, Block 5 succeeded the transitional Block 4 version. The maiden flight of the Block 5 launched the satellite Bangabandhu-1 on May 11, 2018. The CRS-15 mission on June 29, 2018, was the last to be launched on a Block 4 rocket, completing the transition to an all-Block 5 fleet.

=== Falcon Heavy ===
Falcon Heavy is a super heavy-lift launch vehicle (Note: If the boosters and center core are recovered, it only qualifies as a heavy-lift launch vehicle.) with partial reusability that can carry cargo into Earth orbit and beyond. It is designed, manufactured and launched by American aerospace company SpaceX.

The rocket consists of a center core on which two Falcon 9 boosters are attached, and a second stage on top of the center core. Falcon Heavy is one of the highest-capacity launch vehicles in service, alongside NASA's Space Launch System (SLS) and SpaceX's Starship, and has the fourth-highest capacity of any rocket to reach orbit, trailing behind the SLS, Energia and the Saturn V.

SpaceX conducted Falcon Heavy's maiden launch on February 6, 2018, at 20:45 UTC. As a dummy payload, the rocket carried a Tesla Roadster belonging to SpaceX founder Elon Musk, with a mannequin dubbed "Starman" in the driver's seat. The second Falcon Heavy launch occurred on April 11, 2019, and all three booster rockets successfully returned to Earth. The third Falcon Heavy launch successfully occurred on June 25, 2019. Since then, Falcon Heavy has been certified for the National Security Space Launch (NSSL) program.

Falcon Heavy was designed to be able to carry humans into space beyond low Earth orbit (LEO), although as of February 2018, SpaceX does not intend to transport people on Falcon Heavy, nor pursue the human-rating certification process to transport NASA astronauts. Both Falcon Heavy and Falcon 9 are expected to eventually be superseded by the Starship super-heavy lift launch vehicle, which is currently in development.

== In development ==
=== Starship ===
Starship is a two-stage, fully reusable, super heavy-lift launch vehicle under development by American aerospace company SpaceX. Currently built and launched from Starbase in Texas, it is intended as the successor to the company's Falcon 9 and Falcon Heavy rockets, and is part of SpaceX's broader reusable launch system development program. If completed as designed, Starship would be the first fully reusable orbital rocket and have the highest payload capacity of any launch vehicle to date. As of November 13, 2026, Starship has launched 15 times, with 10 successful flights and 5 failures.

The vehicle consists of two stages: the Super Heavy booster and the Starship spacecraft, both powered by Raptor engines burning liquid methane (the main component of natural gas) and liquid oxygen. Both stages are intended to return to the launch site and land vertically at the launch tower for potential reuse. Once in space, the Starship upper stage is intended to function as a standalone spacecraft capable of carrying crew and cargo. Missions beyond low Earth orbit would require multiple in-orbit refueling flights. At the end of its mission, Starship reenters the atmosphere using heat shield tiles similar to those of the Space Shuttle. SpaceX states that its goal is to reduce launch costs by reusing and mass-producing both stages.

SpaceX initially expressed ambitions to use Starship for crewed missions to Mars, but the plan was revised to prioritize returning humans to the Moon. SpaceX has also proposed a wide range of missions for Starship, such as deploying large satellites, space station modules, and space telescopes. A crewed variant, the Starship Human Landing System, is being developed under a contract with NASA as part of the Artemis program, with a crewed docking test in low Earth orbit on Artemis III, targeted for mid-2027, and the first crewed landing moved to Artemis IV, targeted for 2028.

SpaceX began developing concepts for a super heavy-lift reusable launch vehicle as early as 2005, though these concepts did not result in active development of Starship until 2018. Development has followed an iterative and incremental approach, involving a high number of prototype vehicles and test flights. Due to several setbacks in development, including the loss of the first four Block 2 upper stages in 2025 (three in flight and one, Ship 36, in a ground-test explosion), Starship did not attempt to reach orbit until its fourteenth flight test, which deployed Starship's first operational payload.

== Retired ==
=== Falcon 1 ===
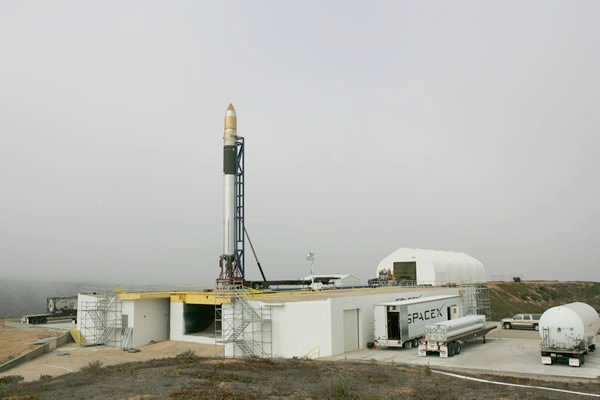
The first Falcon 1 at Vandenberg AFB. This vehicle was removed from VAFB due to delays and eventually launched from Kwajalein.

The Falcon 1 was a small, planned to be partially reusable rocket capable of placing several hundred kilograms into low Earth orbit. It also functioned as a testbed for developing concepts and components for the larger Falcon 9. Initial Falcon 1 flights were launched from the US government's Reagan Test Site on the island atoll of Kwajalein in the Pacific Ocean, and represented the first attempt to fly a ground-launched rocket to orbit from that site.

On March 26, 2006, the Falcon 1's maiden flight failed only seconds after leaving the pad due to a fuel line rupture. After a year, the second flight was launched on March 22, 2007, and it also ended in failure, due to a spin stabilization problem that automatically caused sensors to turn off the Kestrel 2nd-stage engine. The third Falcon 1 flight used a new regenerative cooling system for the first-stage Merlin engine, and the engine development was responsible for the almost 17-month flight delay. The new cooling system turned out to be the major reason the mission failed; because the first stage rammed into the second-stage engine bell at staging, due to excess thrust provided by residual propellant left over from the higher-propellant-capacity cooling system. On September 28, 2008, the Falcon 1 succeeded in reaching orbit on its fourth attempt, becoming the first privately funded, liquid-fueled rocket to do so. The Falcon 1 carried its first and only successful commercial payload into orbit on July 13, 2009, on its fifth launch. No launch attempts of the Falcon 1 have been made since 2009, and SpaceX is no longer taking launch reservations for the Falcon 1 in order to concentrate company resources on its larger Falcon 9 launch vehicle and other development projects.

=== Falcon 9 v1.0 ===
The first version of the Falcon 9 launch vehicle, Falcon 9 v1.0, was developed in 2005–2010, and was launched for the first time in 2010. Falcon 9 v1.0 made five flights in 2010–2013, when it was retired.

=== Falcon 9 v1.1 ===
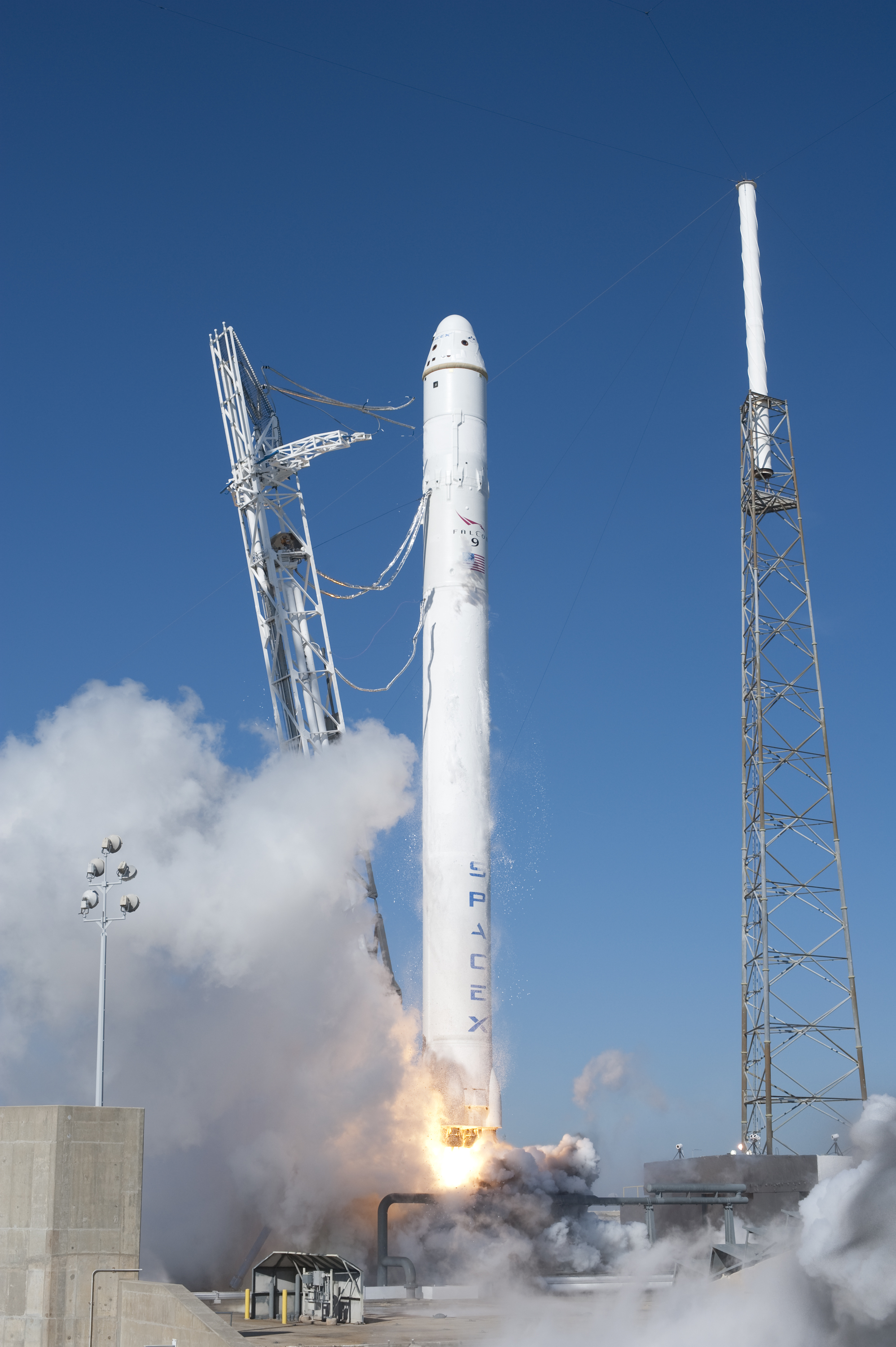
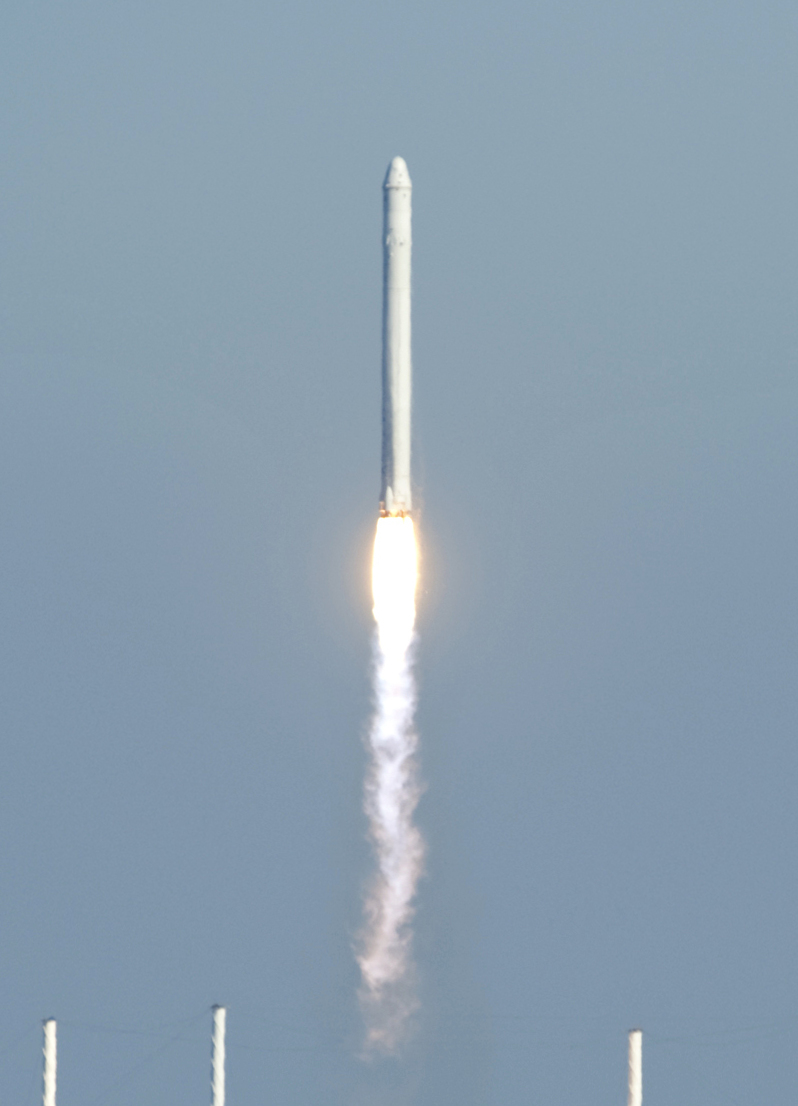
SpaceX's Falcon 9 rocket carrying the Dragon spacecraft, lifts off during the COTS Demo Flight 1 on December 8, 2010

On September 8, 2005, SpaceX announced the development of the Falcon 9 rocket, which has nine Merlin engines in its first stage. The design is an EELV-class vehicle, intended to compete with the Delta IV and the Atlas V, along with launchers of other nations as well. Both stages were designed for reuse. A similarly designed Falcon 5 rocket was also envisioned to fit between the Falcon 1 and Falcon 9, but development was dropped to concentrate on the Falcon 9.

The first version of the Falcon 9, Falcon 9 v1.0, was developed in 2005–2010, and flew five orbital missions in 2010–2013. The second version of the launch system—Falcon 9 v1.1—has been retired meanwhile.

Falcon 9 v1.1 was developed in 2010–2013, and made its maiden flight in September 2013. The Falcon 9 v1.1 is 60 percent heavier, with 60 percent more thrust than the v1.0 version of the Falcon 9. It includes realigned first-stage engines and 60 percent longer fuel tanks, making it more susceptible to bending during flight. The engines themselves have been upgraded to the more powerful Merlin 1D. These improvements increased the payload capability from 10,450 to 13,150 kilograms (23,040 to 28,990 lb).

The stage separation system has been redesigned and reduces the number of attachment points from twelve to three, and the vehicle has upgraded avionics and software.

The new first stage was also supposed to be used as side boosters on the Falcon Heavy launch vehicle.

The company purchased the McGregor, Texas, testing facilities of defunct Beal Aerospace, where it refitted the largest test stand at the facilities for Falcon 9 testing. On November 22, 2008, the stand tested the nine Merlin 1C engines of the Falcon 9, which deliver 770,000 pounds-force (3,400 kN) of thrust, well under the stand's capacity of 3,300,000 pounds-force (15,000 kN).

The first Falcon 9 vehicle was integrated at Cape Canaveral on December 30, 2008. NASA was planning for a flight to take place in January 2010; however the maiden flight was postponed several times and took place on June 4, 2010. At 2:50pm EST (14:50 ET), the Falcon 9 rocket successfully reached orbit.

The second flight for the Falcon 9 vehicle was the COTS Demo Flight 1, the first launch under the NASA Commercial Orbital Transportation Services (COTS) contract designed to provide "seed money" for development of new boosters. The original NASA contract called for the COTS Demo Flight 1 to occur the second quarter of 2008; this flight was delayed several times, occurring at 15:43 GMT on December 8, 2010. The rocket successfully deployed an operational Dragon spacecraft at 15:53 GMT. Dragon orbited the Earth twice, and then made a controlled reentry burn that put it on target for a splashdown in the Pacific Ocean off the coast of Mexico. With Dragon's safe recovery, SpaceX became the first private company to launch, orbit, and recover a spacecraft; prior to this mission only government agencies had been able to recover orbital spacecraft. The first flight of the Falcon 9 v1.1 was September 29, 2013, from Vandenberg Air Force Base carrying several payloads including Canada's CASSIOPE technology demonstration satellite. The Falcon 9 v1.1 features stretched first and second stages, and a new octagonal arrangement of the 9 Merlin-1D engines on the first stage (replacing the square pattern of engines in v1.0). SpaceX notes that the Falcon 9 v1.1 is cheaper to manufacture, and longer than v1.0. It also has a larger payload capacity: 13,150 kilograms to low Earth orbit or 4,850 kg to geosynchronous transfer orbit.

=== Grasshopper ===
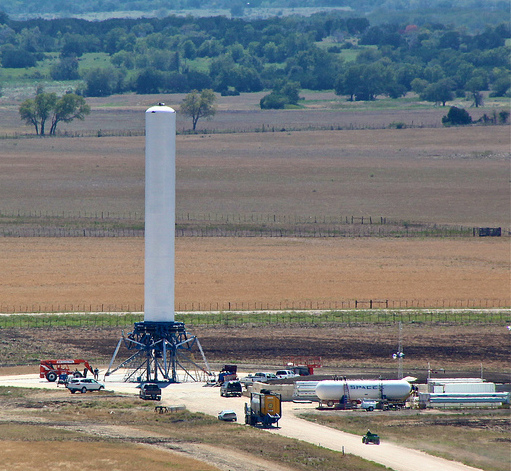
Grasshopper vehicle in September 2012

Grasshopper was an experimental technology-demonstrator, suborbital reusable launch vehicle (RLV), a vertical takeoff, vertical landing (VTVL) rocket. The first VTVL flight test vehicle—Grasshopper, built on a Falcon 9 v1.0 first-stage tank—made a total of eight test flights between September 2012 and October 2013. All eight flights were from the McGregor, Texas, test facility.

Grasshopper began flight testing in September 2012 with a brief, three-second hop. It was followed by a second hop in November 2012, which consisted of an 8-second flight that took the testbed approximately 5.4 m (18 ft) off the ground. A third flight occurred in December 2012 of 29 seconds duration, with extended hover under rocket engine power, in which it ascended to an altitude of 40 m (130 ft) before descending under rocket power to come to a successful vertical landing. Grasshopper made its eighth and final test flight on October 7, 2013, flying to an altitude of 744 m (2,441 ft; 0.462 mi) before making its eighth successful vertical landing. The Grasshopper test vehicle is now retired.

== Cancelled ==
=== Falcon 1e ===
The Falcon 1e was a proposed upgrade of the SpaceX Falcon 1. The Falcon 1e would have featured a larger first stage with a higher thrust engine, an upgraded second stage engine, a larger payload fairing, and was intended to be partially reusable. Its first launch was planned for mid-2011, but the Falcon 1 and Falcon 1e were withdrawn from the market, with SpaceX citing "limited demand," before its debut. Payloads that would have flown on the Falcon 1 were instead to be flown on the Falcon 9 using excess capacity.

The Falcon 1e was to be 6.1 m (20 ft) longer than the Falcon 1, with an overall length of 27.4 m (90 ft), but with the same 1.68 m (5 ft 6 in) diameter. Its first stage had a dry mass of 2,580 kg (5,680 lb), and was powered by an upgraded pump-fed Merlin 1C engine burning 39,000 kg (87,000 lb) of RP-1 and liquid oxygen. The first stage burn time was around 169 seconds. The second stage had a dry mass of 540 kg (1,200 lb) and its pressure-fed Kestrel 2 engine burned 4,000 kg (8,900 lb) of propellant. The restartable Kestrel 2 could burn for up to a total of 418 seconds.

The Falcon 1e planned to use Aluminum Lithium alloy 2195 in the second stage, a change from the 2014 Aluminum used in the Falcon 1 second stages.

Falcon 1e launches were intended to occur from Omelek Island, part of Kwajalein Atoll in the Marshall Islands, and from Cape Canaveral, however SpaceX had announced that they would consider other locations as long as there is a "business case for establishing the requested launch site". Following a demonstration flight, the Falcon 1e was intended to make a series of launches carrying Orbcomm O2G spacecraft, with a total of eighteen satellites being launched, several per rocket. EADS Astrium had been responsible for marketing the Falcon 1e in Europe.

=== Falcon 5 ===
Early Falcon 5 design

The Falcon 5 was a proposed two-stage-to-orbit partially reusable launch vehicle designed by SpaceX.

The first stage of Falcon 5 was to be powered by five Merlin engines, and the upper stage by one Merlin engine, both burning RP-1 with a liquid oxygen oxidizer. Along with the Falcon 9, it would have been the world's only launch vehicle with its first stage designed for reuse.

The Falcon 5 would have been the first American rocket since the Saturn V to have full engine-out capability, meaning that with the loss of one engine, it can still meet mission requirements by burning the other four engines longer to achieve the correct orbit. In comparison, the Space Shuttle only had partial engine-out capability, meaning that it was not able to achieve proper orbit by burning the remaining engines longer.

In 2006, SpaceX stated that the Falcon 5 was a Falcon 9 with four engines removed. Since the launchers were being co-developed, work on the Falcon 9 was also applicable to the Falcon 5.

=== Falcon 9 Air ===
Falcon 9 Air would have been an air-launched multi-stage launch vehicle under development by SpaceX in 2011–2012. Falcon 9 Air was to be carried to launch position and launch altitude by a Stratolaunch Systems carrier aircraft, the world's largest aircraft by wingspan. Payload to low Earth orbit was projected to be 6,100 kg (13,400 pounds).

Propulsion for the rocket was planned to be provided by four Merlin 1D rocket engines, engines that were also to be used in the Falcon 9 v1.1 beginning in 2013, and also on the Falcon Heavy in 2014. Its first flight was notionally planned for 2016.

In December 2011 Stratolaunch Systems announced that it would contract with SpaceX to develop an air-launched, multiple-stage launch vehicle, as a derivative of Falcon 9 technology, called the Falcon 9 Air, as part of the Stratolaunch project. As initially conceived with the SpaceX Falcon 9 Air (F9A) launch vehicle, Stratolaunch was to initially place satellites of up to 6,100 kg (13,400 pounds) into low Earth orbit; and once established as a reliable system, announced that it would explore a human-rated version. The system can take off from airfields with a minimum 3,700 m (12,100 feet) length, and the F9A carrier aircraft was proposed to travel to a launch point up to 2,200 km (1,200 nautical miles) away from the airfield and fly at a launch altitude of 9,100 m (30,000 feet).

A month after the initial announcement, Stratolaunch confirmed that the first stage of the F9A launch vehicle would have only four engines, not the five that were shown in the mission video in December, and that they would be SpaceX Merlin 1D engines.

As initially announced, Stratolaunch Systems was a collaborative project that included subcontractors SpaceX, Scaled Composites, and Dynetics, with funding provided by Microsoft co-founder Paul G. Allen's Vulcan investment and project management company. Stratolaunch set out to build a mobile launch system with three primary components: a carrier aircraft (aircraft concept was designed by Burt Rutan, but the aircraft will be designed and built by Scaled Composites); a multi-stage launch vehicle to be developed and built by SpaceX; and a mating and integration system—allowing the carrier aircraft to safely carry and release the booster—to be built by Dynetics, a Huntsville, Alabama-based engineering company. The whole system will be the largest aircraft ever built; with the first test flight of the carrier aircraft originally expected in 2015 from Scaled Composites' facilities in Mojave, California, while the first test launch of the rocket was not expected before 2016 at the time of the project getting underway.

As the Stratolaunch development program progressed, it became clear that Stratolaunch and the system integrator, Dynetics, wanted modifications to the SpaceX basic launch-vehicle design that SpaceX felt were not strategic to the direction they were growing the company. These included requested modifications to the launch vehicle to add chines.

Development ceased in the fourth quarter of 2012, as SpaceX and Stratolaunch "amicably agreed to end [their] contractual relationship because the [Stratolaunch] launch vehicle design [had] departed significantly from the Falcon derivative vehicle envisioned by SpaceX and does not fit well with [SpaceX's] long-term strategic business model".

On November 27, 2012, Stratolaunch announced that they would partner with Orbital Sciences Corporation—initially on an air-launched vehicle study contract—instead of SpaceX, effectively ending development of the Falcon 9 Air.

In May 2013, the Falcon 9 Air was eventually replaced in the development plan by the Orbital Sciences Pegasus II air-launched rocket.

== Competitive position ==
SpaceX Falcon rockets are being offered to the launch industry at highly competitive prices, allowing SpaceX to build a large manifest of over 50 launches by late 2013, with two-thirds of them for commercial customers exclusive of US government flights.

In the US launch industry, SpaceX prices its product offerings well below its competition. Nevertheless, "somewhat incongruously, its primary US competitor, United Launch Alliance (ULA), still maintained (in early 2013) that it requires a large annual subsidy, which neither SpaceX nor Orbital Sciences receives, in order to remain financially viable, with the reason cited as a lack of market opportunity, a stance which seems to be in conflict with the market itself."

SpaceX launched its first satellite to geostationary orbit in December 2013 (SES-8) and followed that a month later with its second, Thaicom 6, beginning to offer competition to the European and Russian launch providers that had been the major players in the commercial communications satellite market in recent years.

SpaceX prices undercut its major competitors—the Ariane 5 and Proton—in this market.

Moreover, SpaceX prices for Falcon 9 and Falcon Heavy are much lower than the projected prices for Ariane 6, projected to be available in 2024.

As a result of additional mission requirements for government launches, SpaceX prices US government missions somewhat higher than similar commercial missions, but has noted that even with those added services, Falcon 9 missions contracted to the government are still priced well below US$100 million (even with approximately US$9 million in special security charges for some missions) which is a very competitive price compared to ULA prices for government payloads of the same size.

ULA prices to the US government are nearly $400 million for current launches of Falcon 9- and Falcon Heavy-class payloads.

SpaceX had a rare coincidence of four rockets (all types of operational and under-development rockets) on all four of its orbital launch pads and two Dragon 2s (both types of Dragon 2s) on orbit on January 10, 2023. This was coupled before the end of the year with SpaceX igniting all of their rockets within 24 hours on December 28–29, 2023 (Falcon family rockets launching on their missions and both Starship stages performing static fires).

== Comparison ==
	Falcon 1	Falcon 1e	Falcon 9 v1.0	Falcon 9 v1.1	Falcon 9 Full Thrust	Falcon Heavy	Starship Block 1
Booster Stage	−	−	−	−	−	2 boosters with 9 × Merlin 1D (with minor upgrades)	−
Stage 1	1 × Merlin 1C^{[A]}	1 × Merlin 1C	9 × Merlin 1C	9 × Merlin 1D	9 × Merlin 1D (with minor upgrades)	9 × Merlin 1D (with minor upgrades)	33 × Raptor 2
Stage 2	1 × Kestrel	1 × Kestrel	1 × Merlin Vacuum (1C)	1 × Merlin 1D Vacuum	1 × Merlin 1D Vacuum (with minor upgrades)	1 × Merlin 1D Vacuum (with minor upgrades)	3 × Raptor 2, 3 × Raptor 2 Vacuum
Max. height (m)	21.3	26.83	54.9	68.4	70	70	121.3
Diameter (m)	1.7	1.7	3.6	3.7	3.7	3.7 × 11.6	9
Initial thrust (kN)	318	454	4,900	5,885	6,804; 7,607 (late 2016)	22,819	69,900
Takeoff mass (tonnes)	27.2	38.56	333	506	549	1,421	5,000
Inner fairing diameter (m)	1.5	1.71	3.7 or 5.2	5.2	5.2	5.2	9
LEO payload (kg)	570	1,010	10,450	13,150	22,800 (expendable, from Cape Canaveral)	63,800 (expendable)	100,000 (reusable)
GTO payload (kg)	−	−	4,540	4,850	8,500 (expendable); 5,500 (reusable)	26,700 (expendable)	21,000 (reusable)
Price history (mil. USD)	2006: 6.7; 2007: 6.9; 2008: 7.9	2007: 8.5; 2008: 9.1; 2010: 10.9	2005: 27 (3.6 m fairing to LEO); 35 (5.2 m fairing to LEO); 2011: 54 to 59.5	2013: 54 to 56.5	2014: 61.2	2011: 80 to 124; 2012: 83 to 128; 2013: 77.1 (≤6,400 kg to GTO); 135 (>6,400 kg to GTO)	<90
Current price (mil. USD)	−	−	−	–	67 (≤5,500 kg to GTO)	90 (≤8,000 kg to GTO)	<90
Success ratio (successful/total)	2/5	−	5/5	14/15 (CRS-7 lost in flight)	681/682 (not including loss of AMOS-6)	14/14	10/15

^{A} For Falcon 1 Flights 3 through 5. Merlin 1A was used for Falcon 1 Flights 1 and 2.

== See also ==
- List of Falcon 9 and Falcon Heavy launches
