= Stratolaunch Systems =

American space transportation venture

Coordinates: 35°02′53.6064″N 118°08′31.9524″W

Stratolaunch LLC
- Type: Private
- Industry: Aerospace
- Founded: 2011; 15 years ago as Stratolaunch Systems Corp.
- Headquarters: Mojave Air and Space Port; Mojave, California, U.S.
- Key people: Zachary Krevor (CEO)
- Products: Flight test services
- Number of employees: 360 (December 2023)
- Parent: Cerberus Capital Management
- Website: stratolaunch.com

Stratolaunch LLC is a private American aerospace company providing high-speed flight test services. It was founded in 2011 to develop a new air-launched space transportation system. Its corporate headquarters are in Seattle. The company and development project were announced in December 2011 by Microsoft co-founder Paul Allen and Scaled Composites founder Burt Rutan, who had previously collaborated on SpaceShipOne. The company was acquired in 2019 by Cerberus Capital Management and has continued with private funding, operating as a non-traditional defense contractor.

Comparison between five of the largest aircraft: Stratolaunch Airbus A380-800 Antonov An-225 Mriya Boeing 747-8 Hughes H-4 Hercules

The project involves three components: a carrier aircraft being built by Scaled Composites (model Stratolaunch, called "Roc"), a multi-stage payload launch vehicle launched at high altitude into space from under the carrier, plus a mating and integration system by Dynetics.

== History ==
The project was started in 2010, almost a year before the public announcement was made. Development costs were initially projected to be US$300 million in 2011. Dynetics actually began work in early 2010 and had approximately 40 employees working on the project as of December 2011. Dynetics was cited as "responsible for the total systems engineering, integration and testing, which includes aerodynamics, loads, and interfaces". It was announced in 2011 that SpaceX was also already working on the design for the rocket-powered space vehicle components of the system, the Falcon 9 Air.

Stratolaunch logo from 2021

The collaboration with SpaceX ended by 2012. In a 2015 interview, former president Chuck Beames (2014–2016) explained, "SpaceX was a partner, and like a lot of partnerships, it was just determined that it was best we went our separate ways – different ambitions. We were interested in their engines, but Elon and his team, they're about going to Mars, and we're just in a different place, and so I think it was a parting of the ways that was amicable".

Stratolaunch Systems completed its first 88,000 sq ft (8,200 m^{2}) composites production building in October 2012. In February 2013, the company completed construction of its 92,640 sq ft (8,607 m^{2}) carrier assembly hangar and operations facilities at the Mojave Air and Space Port.

The carrier aircraft was originally projected to make its first test flight in 2015. By October 2013, the first flight of the carrier aircraft was pushed back until 2018 at the earliest, with the first flight of the air-launched rocket expected in 2019 at the earliest.

In 2014, Stratolaunch announced that it was considering multiple launch vehicle options over a range of satellite sizes, and that some development work on the orbital launch vehicle has been slowed down to focus on completion of the carrier aircraft.

In 2014, Stratolaunch Systems was placed under the supervision of Paul Allen's new aerospace company Vulcan Aerospace, a subsidiary of Vulcan Inc. Beames stated, "Vulcan Aerospace is the company within Vulcan that plans and executes projects to shift how the world conceptualizes space travel through cost reduction and on‐demand access. Vulcan Aerospace has its heritage in SpaceShipOne and oversees the Stratolaunch Systems project"

Later in the year, in November 2015, Gary Wentz "stepped down as president and CEO of Stratolaunch Systems to join United Launch Alliance to lead human launch services" for ULA. Vulcan ended its contract with Orbital ATK in mid-2015 and indicated that a decision on a new rocket for the Stratolaunch Carrier Aircraft would be made in late 2015.

In 2017, Fast Company named the Stratolaunch one of the world's most innovative companies citing the air-launch system's size and ability to fly in inclement weather. In April 2017, Stratolaunch formally transitioned its name from Vulcan Aerospace to Stratolaunch Systems Corporation.

In May 2017, the Stratolaunch was rolled out for the first time to begin fueling tests, the first of many ground tests.

In December 2017, the Stratolaunch was rolled out for the first taxi test on the runway at the Mojave Air and Space Port in California. On April 13, 2019, Stratolaunch took to the air for the first time and flew for two and a half hours from the Mojave Air and Space Port. The flight reached a maximum altitude of 4,570 meters and a top speed of 278 kilometers per hour.

In January 2019, Stratolaunch announced it was halting development of its own air-launched family of launch vehicles. This followed the Allen's death in October 2018, who had been the source of funds for the capital intensive development program since its founding in 2011. In April 2019, Jean Floyd remained CEO of Stratolaunch.

The carrier first flew in April 2019, at the Mojave Air and Space Port, reaching 15,000 ft (4,600 m) and 190 mph (305 km/h) during a 2 hour 29 minute flight.

On 31 May 2019, it was reported that the company would cease operations and sell its assets. In the event, the company remained in operation and posted job openings, including listings for test pilots, in September 2019. Stratolaunch rapidly grew their staff from 13 employees in October 2019 to 87 employees by mid-December 2019, later reaching 360 employees and contractors.

Stratolaunch underwent a change of direction when Jean Floyd became CEO in 2019, reacquiring staff and growing to 87 employees by the beginning of 2020. Zachary Krevor became president and CEO in March 2022. Krevor was previously vice president of engineering.

== Carrier aircraft ==
=== Roc ===
The Scaled Composites Model 351 Stratolaunch or Roc is the world’s largest operating aircraft built by Scaled Composites for Stratolaunch Systems to carry air-launch-to-orbit (ALTO) rockets, and subsequently repurposed to offer air launch hypersonic flight testing after a change of ownership. It was announced in December 2011, rolled out in May 2017, and flew for the first time on April 13, 2019, shortly after the death of founder Paul Allen.

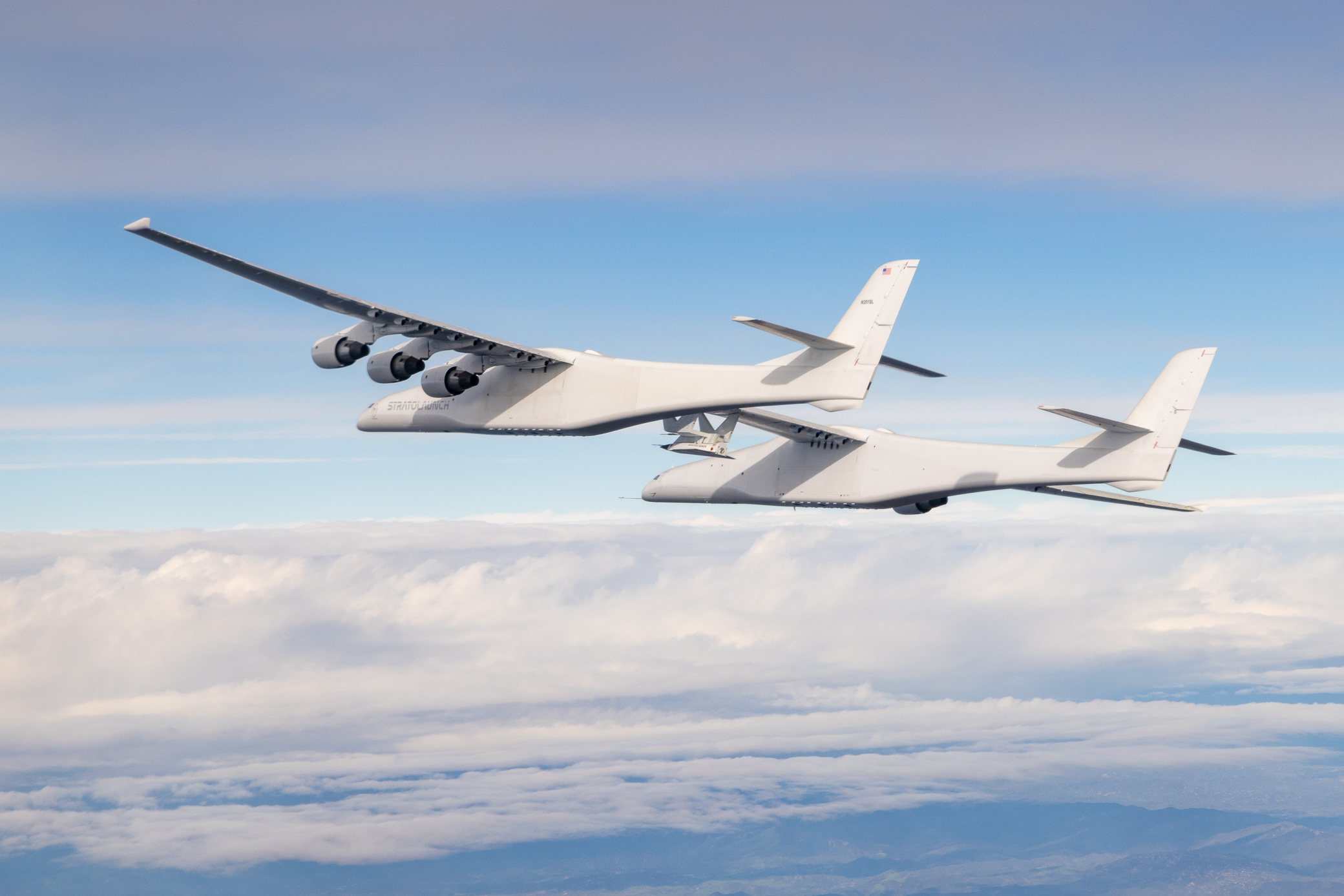
Scaled Composites Model 351 Stratolaunch, Roc

The aircraft features a twin-fuselage design and the longest wingspan ever flown, at 385 feet (117 m), surpassing the Hughes H-4 Hercules "Spruce Goose" flying boat of 321 feet (98 m). The dual fuselage and high-wing design allow for multiple launch vehicles to attach and release from the aircraft centerline. The Stratolaunch is intended to carry a 550,000-pound (250 t) payload and has a 1,300,000-pound (590 t) maximum takeoff weight.

The carrier plane is powered by six Pratt & Whitney PW4000, 46,000–66,500 lbf (205,000–296,000 N) thrust-range jet engines, sourced from two used 747-400s that were cannibalized for engines, avionics, flight deck, landing gear and other proven systems to reduce initial development costs. The carrier is designed to have a range of 2,200 km (1,400 mi) when flying an air launch mission.

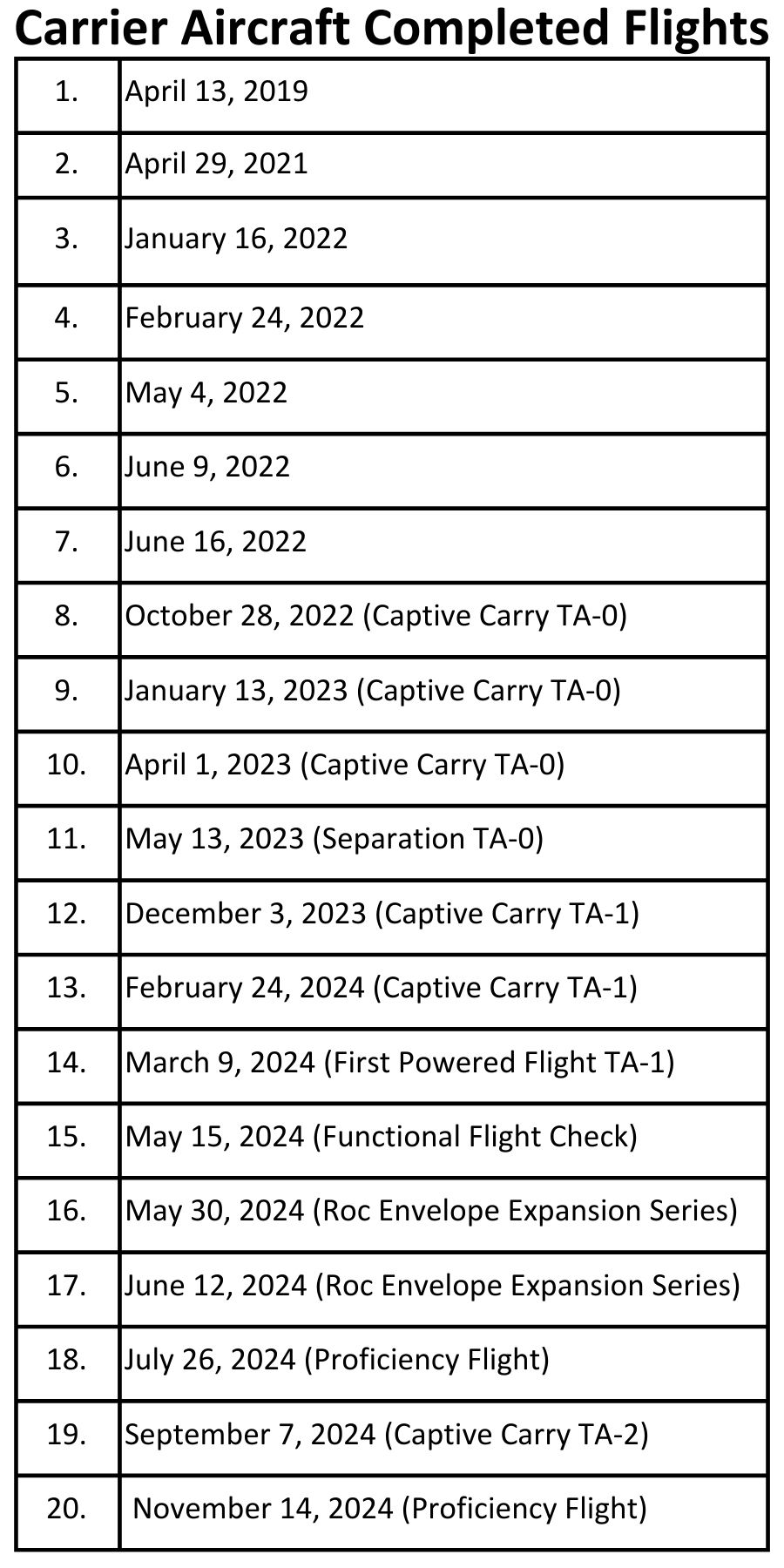

The first successful flight test was performed on April 13, 2019. The aircraft flew for 2.5 hours, achieving a speed of 189 mph (304 km/h) and altitudes up to 17,000 ft (5,200 m). The carrier aircraft’s adaptable hardware attached to the center wing called pylon, was installed onto the carrier plane in April 2022 and is designed to carry and release Talon-A vehicles during flight. The structure is 14 ft wide, 19 ft long, and 10 ft tall and weighs 8,000 lb when empty. It is constructed mostly of aluminum with carbon fiber skins. Its structure contains approximately 10,000 bolts and 40,000 hardware components (bolts, nuts, washers, rivets). Although the design and integration planning spanned months, the physical installation of the pylon onto the carrier aircraft lasted 4 hours. There is approximately 7 ft. from lower wing surface to upper mini-wing surface. The bottom mini-wing surface is approximately 16 ft. off the ground. The release system functions using explosive/expendable bolts that are triggered at the pilot’s direction when the vehicle is ready to be released.

As of June 12, 2024, the Stratolaunch carrier has flown a total of 20 times and prepares for continued flights carrying Talon hypersonic aircraft. As of March 9, 2024, the Stratolaunch carrier successfully released a powered supersonic test vehicle for the first time.

=== Spirit of Mojave ===
In May 2023, Stratolaunch announced the approval to acquire Virgin Orbit's modified Boeing 747 and its related parts and equipment, marking an expansion of the company’s air-launch fleet. The name “The Spirit of Mojave” refers to both the historic Spirit of St. Louis and the Mojave Air and Space Port community.

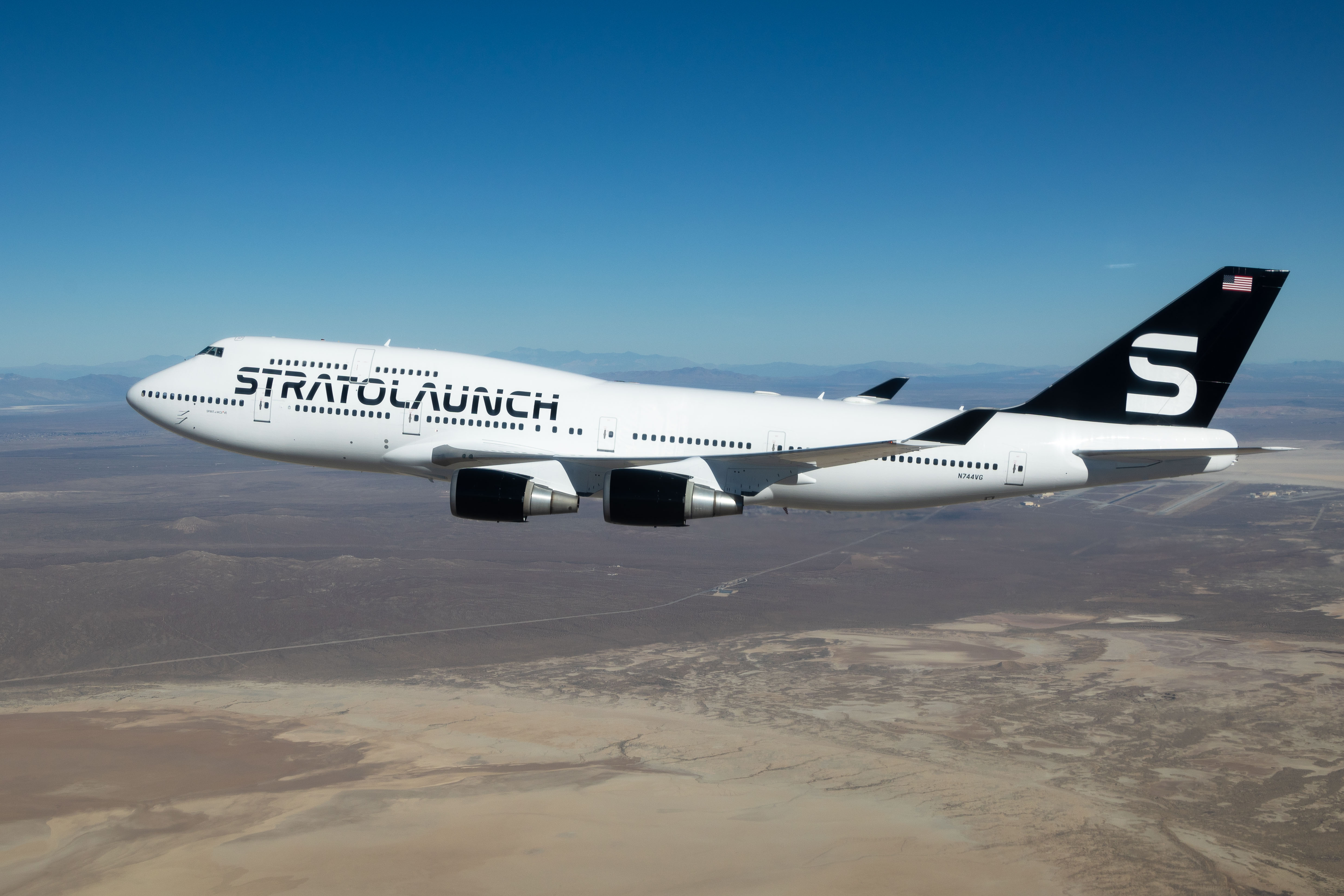
Spirit of Mojave Boeing 747-400 aircraft

This 747 aircraft was formerly a passenger airliner with Virgin Atlantic and in 2015 was purchased by Virgin Orbit to be used as the first stage launch platform (or mothership launch pad) for the air launch stage of the satellite orbital launch vehicle, the LauncherOne. LauncherOne attempted its first launch on May 25, 2020; the launch was a failure. The first successful launch (second launch in total) took place on January 17, 2021. After the Virgin Orbit parent company declared bankruptcy in April 2023, this 747 was purchased on May 25, 2023 by Stratolaunch where the aircraft is undergoing modifications for its new mission. The 747 has flown 6 times with a total of 17.9 flight hours under Stratolaunch ownership. The aircraft is expected to be operational by mid-year 2024.

== Systems ==
=== Talon-A ===
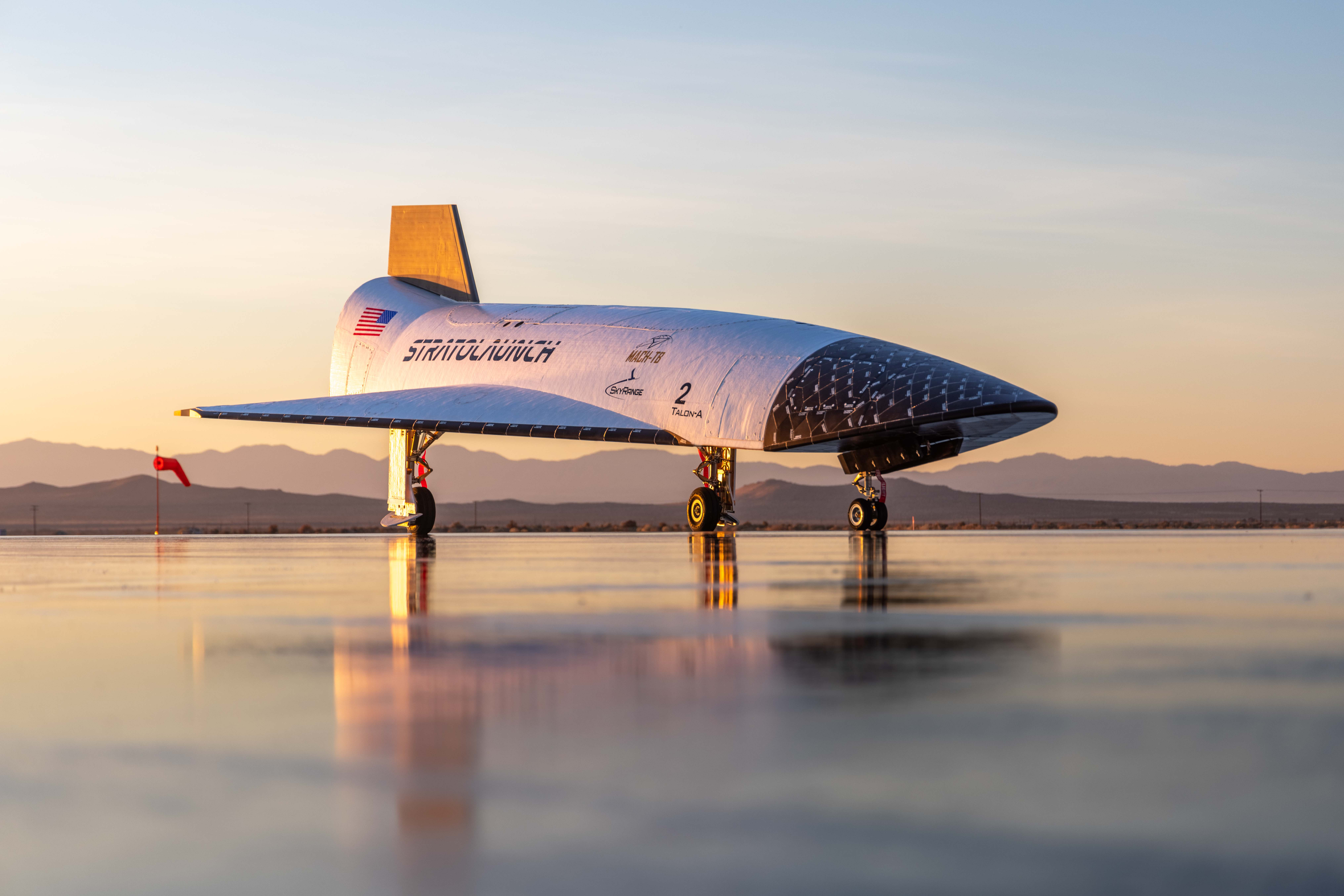
Talon-A, Hypersonic Testbed

Originally proposed in 2018 as the Hyper-A, Stratolaunch is developing a reusable, rocket-powered, hypersonic flight vehicle called Talon-A that would be capable of flying at speeds of Mach 5 – Mach 7 (6,100–8,600 km/h; 3,800–5,300 mph). The aircraft is 28 ft (8.5 m) in length, with a wingspan of 11.3 ft (3.4 m), and is intended to have a launch mass of approximately 6,000 lb (2,700 kg) and be capable of runway landings.

In May 2021 Stratolaunch announced the Talon-A test vehicles TA-0 and TA-1 were structurally complete.

TA-0 completed separation testing in 2023, demonstrating safe release and controlled flight before its glided descent into the Pacific Ocean.

TA-1 flew its first captive carry with live propellant on board in December 2023. In March 2024 Stratolaunch announced completion of the first powered flight of TA-1, including a controlled ocean disposal.

Stratolaunch Systems' TA-2 is the first fully reusable hypersonic test vehicle. As of May 2025 TA-2 has flown twice with both flights surpassing Mach 5 and then gliding to a landing on a runway. The hypersonic flights were in December 2024 and March 2025.

Future iterations of Talon-A will be testbeds carrying customizable payloads at speeds above Mach 5 with the capability for runway landings. Reuse would enable lower-cost access to sub-thermosphere hypersonic environments.

=== Future vehicles ===
Further concepts, including Talon+ and a space plane, are listed on the company's website.

== Facilities ==
In 2011, Stratolaunch Systems signed a 20-year lease agreement with the Kern County Airport Authority, Mojave, California, for the lease of 20 acres (81,000 m^{2}) at the Mojave Air and Space Port to build production and launch facilities. The company headquarters, engineering, manufacturing, and operations are all in Mojave, including production, test, and operations infrastructure.

By 2015, Stratolaunch had built a 92,400 sq ft (8,580 m^{2}) fabrication hangar and a 107,275 sq ft (9,966.2 m^{2}) assembly hangar located near Scaled Composites. The first of two manufacturing buildings, the "92,400 square foot facility [to] be used to construct the composite sections of the wing and fuselage sections", was opened for production in October 2012, two months ahead of schedule and on budget. Stratolaunch completed their second Mojave building, the very large hangar facility for the Stratolaunch Carrier Aircraft, in February 2013.

On 31 May 2017, the first Stratolaunch carrier aircraft was towed from the Stratolaunch Mojave hangar to begin ground testing.

== See also ==
- White Knight One carrier aircraft
- White Knight Two carrier aircraft
- Comparison of orbital launch systems
- Airborne aircraft carrier
- Lockheed C-5 Galaxy launch of LGM-30 Minuteman
- North American X-15 earliest air-launched, crewed, sub-orbital spacecraft
- LauncherOne, Virgin Orbit's smaller scale proposal similar to StratoLaunch's
- Orbital Sciences Pegasus, a similar but smaller scale system
- Skylon
- Conroy Virtus, a proposed aircraft that could have been the shuttle launch vehicle
