= Block House (Melcombe) =

Fortification in Weymouth, Dorset

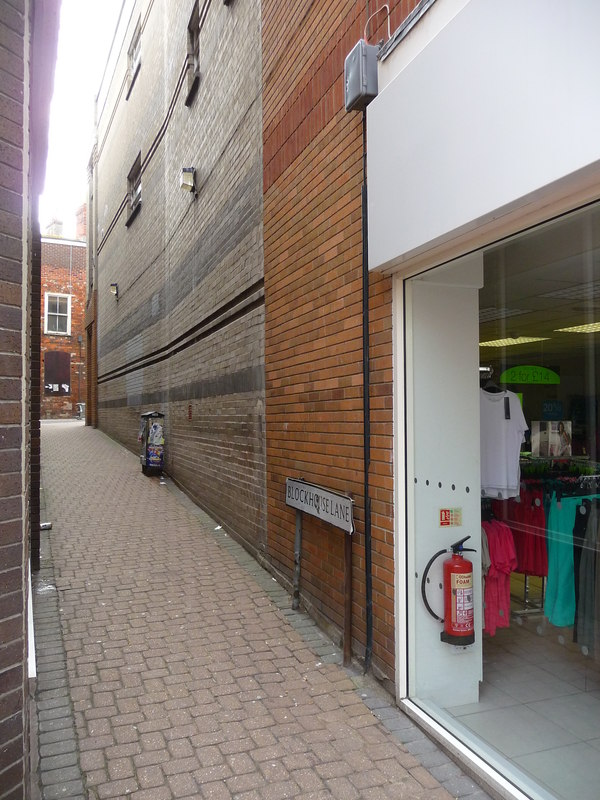
The approximate site of the fort today.

The Block House was an old fort in the town of Melcombe, in Weymouth, Dorset, southern England. There are no visible remains today.

== History ==
The fort was mentioned in texts from 1568 and 1617, and so dates from before that time. It was probably built by the town of Melcombe, before 1571, when Melcome and Weymouth became a single borough.

When built, the fort was 45 feet (14 m) square, and was made of stone. It likely stood opposite a passage from Maiden Street to St Mary's Street, which today is likely Blockhouse Lane. At the time, it was built on the site of "Charloote Row" (50°36′37″N 2°27′12″W), which is now a terrace and listed building. There were embrasures for eight guns, although only five were ever fitted. During the reign of Elizabeth I, a gentleman called Richard Smith was given the office of gunner, known as vi bellator, for life. This suggests some royal funding for the fort, although it was likely built by the town of Melcombe, rather than the Crown itself.

== See also ==
- Cotton Fort
- Nothe Fort
