= RAF St Mawgan =

Royal Air Force station in Cornwall, England

RAF St Mawgan
- Near St Mawgan, Cornwall in England
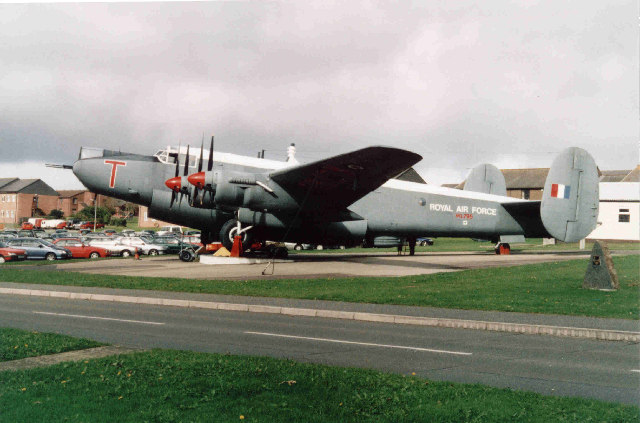
- Shackleton Aircraft as gate guardian

- Vigila (Latin for 'Be watchful')

Site information
- Type: Royal Air Force station
- Code: EGDG
- Owner: Ministry of Defence
- Operator: Royal Air Force
- Controlled by: No. 2 Group
- Website: www.raf.mod.uk/our-organisation/stations/raf-st-mawgan/

Location
- Shown within Cornwall RAF St Mawgan (the United Kingdom)
- Coordinates: 50°26′05″N 005°00′47″W
- Grid reference: SW870646

Site history
- Built: 1939/40
- In use: 1940-Present

Garrison information
- Current commander: Wing Commander H. R. Simpson
- Occupants: Defence Survival, Evasion, Resistance, Extraction Training Organisation; Defence Infrastructure Organisation SD Training; No. 505 Squadron (RAuxAF)

Royal Air Force St Mawgan or more simply RAF St Mawgan is a Royal Air Force station near St Mawgan and Newquay in Cornwall, England. In 2008 the runway part of the site was handed over to Newquay Airport. The remainder of the station continues to operate under the command of the RAF. RAF St Mawgan used to have the widest military runway in the UK (300 ft) and was the home of the Cornwall Air Ambulance service and more recently 505 (Wessex) Squadron Royal Auxiliary Air Force (RAuxAF).

== History ==
=== Second World War ===
Opened as a civilian airfield in 1933, it was requisitioned at the outbreak of the Second World War and named RAF Trebelzue, initially as a satellite of nearby RAF St Eval, but was expanded with twin concrete runways. In February 1943 it was renamed RAF St. Mawgan and in June 1943, the United States Army Air Forces took over and carried out a number of major improvements, including a new control tower and a further extension of the main runway. The airfield was put under care and maintenance on 1 July 1947.

=== Cold War ===
In 1951, it reopened as an RAF Coastal Command air base for the Air-Sea Warfare Development Unit RAF (ASWDU) where trials of new electronic equipment were carried out, to ascertain the suitability of the equipment for general use in Coastal Command, and for maritime reconnaissance, flying mainly Avro Shackleton aircraft, with support from a few Avro Lancaster aircraft. In 1956, No 220 and 228 Long Range Reconnaissance Squadrons were renumbered Nos 201 and 206 Squadrons and joined by 42 Squadron in 1958. RAF St Mawgan also became the Headquarters of 22 (Helicopter) Squadron. In 1965, 201 Squadron and 206 Squadron moved to RAF Kinloss and were replaced by the Maritime Operational Training Unit.

In 1956, the last Lancaster in RAF operational service left RAF St Mawgan after a brief ceremony conducted by the then Commander-in-Chief of Coastal Command, Air Marshal Sir Bryan Reynolds. The Lancaster was an MR3 variant from the School of Maritime Reconnaissance.

7 Sqn, flying English Electric Canberras, operated at RAF St Mawgan as target tugs from 1970 until 1982, with 22 Squadron moving out in 1974. 42 Squadron and 236 Operational Conversion Unit moved to RAF Kinloss in 1992, taking away RAF St Mawgan's fixed-wing station-based aircraft, the Hawker-Siddeley Nimrods which had been at the station since 1969. In 1976 some scenes in the film The Eagle Has Landed were filmed on the camp. Nuclear depth charges intended for anti-submarine use by the US Navy P-3 Orion, Royal Air Force Nimrod and former Dutch Navy P-3 Orion aircraft, were stored at the United States Navy Atomic Weapons Department, situated at the west end of the airbase.

The Joint Maritime Facility (JMF) (50°26′17.0″N 5°00′22.7″W), a unit jointly operated by the Royal Navy and United States Navy, was commissioned at St Mawgan on 18 August 1995 after equipment from United States Naval Facility, Brawdy, Wales, a Sound Surveillance System (SOSUS) shore terminal commissioned 5 April 1974, had been transferred and the sea systems had been remoted to the new facility. The SOSUS fixed bottom surveillance system had been augmented by mobile, towed arrays and the combined system renamed Integrated Undersea Surveillance System (IUSS) in 1984.

=== 21st century ===
In 2005, RAF St Mawgan was one of the airfields shortlisted to house the new Joint Combat Aircraft (JCA) in 2013, but in November 2005 it was announced by Armed Forces Minister Adam Ingram, that it would be going to RAF Lossiemouth in Scotland.

In November 2006, No. 1 Squadron RAF Regiment moved to RAF Honington and No. 2625 (County of Cornwall) Squadron Royal Auxiliary Air Force (RAuxAF) was disbanded. Helicopter maintenance (HMF) also ceased here in that year. Until May 2008, RAF St Mawgan was primarily used as a Search and Rescue training camp and was home to 203(R) Squadron, equipped with Sea King helicopters. The SAR Force HQ was also located here. Both 203(R) Squadron and the SAR Force HQ moved to RAF Valley.

On 1 December 2008 the airfield part of the camp (including the civilian side) closed but the RAF still remain on a reduced area. This was to allow full control of the airport to be handed to Cornwall County Council, with work including a new ATC tower and runway lights. The airport received a full CAA licence to operate in December 2008.

It was announced in early 2009 that the JMF would close in order to save the US Navy £6.5 million per year, losing 22 jobs in the process. RAF St Mawgan was the last remaining US Navy installation in the U.K. The systems at the JMF were remoted to the Naval Ocean Processing Facility (NOPF), Dam Neck, Virginia with the remaining personnel from JMF at RAF St Mawgan moved to the Virginia facility. The NOPF is a joint United States and United Kingdom, forces operation (the largest such contingent in the U.S.) under Commander, Undersea Surveillance.

In February 2013, £11 million was invested in the base to develop a new survival training facility providing key training areas for visiting task groups.

In March 2015 the former airfield of the base became a strong contender to be the first UK spaceport for horizontal take off and landing after being shortlisted by the government. The plans subsequently led to the establishment of Spaceport Cornwall at Newquay Airport. The first orbital launch took place on 9 January 2023 (launch ended in failure, with satellites not reaching orbit) as the result of a partnership with Virgin Orbit.

March 2016, RAF St Mawgan completed a brand new guardroom block, built by Babcock adjacent to the old guardroom but much larger with: car parking, office facilities and accommodation.

== Units ==
The following units were also here at some point:

- ‘O’ Flight of No. 1 Anti-Aircraft Co-operation Unit RAF (May - October 1942)
- No. 2 Overseas Aircraft Despatch Unit RAF (1942-46)
- No. 10 Squadron RAF
- No. 16 Ferry Unit RAF (1946)
- No. 217 Squadron RAF
- No. 264 (Madras Presidency) Squadron RAF
- No. 282 Squadron RAF
- No. 400 Squadron RCAF
- No. 626 Volunteer Gliding Squadron RAF (1955-? & 1990-92)
- 744 Naval Air Squadron
- 814 Naval Air Squadron
- No. 1360 Flight RAF (1957-58) became No. 217 Squadron RAF
- No. 1529 (Beam Approach Training) Flight RAF (1944-46)
- No. 3 Section of No. 1552 (Radio Aids Training) Flight RAF (1946)
- No. 1602 (Anti-Aircraft Co-operation) Flight RAF (1942-43)
- Detachment of No. 1604 (Anti-Aircraft Co-operation) Flight RAF (1942-43)
- No. 2761 Squadron RAF Regiment
- Armament Synthetic Development Unit RAF (1945-46)
- Coastal Command Aircraft Preparation & Modification Flight RAF (1951-54) became Coastal Command Modification Centre RAF (1954-55)
- Mk.X AI Conversion Flight RAF
- Detachment of Overseas Aircraft Despatch Unit RAF (December 1941)
- SAR Aircraft Engineering Development Investigation Team (November 1992 - ?)
- SAR Wing Engineering Squadron (November 1992 - ?)
- Sea King Maintenance School (November 1992 - ?)
- Sea King Operational Conversion Unit RAF (1996) became No. 203 Squadron RAF
- Sea King Operational Evaluation Unit RAF (1996-97)
- Sea King Training Unit RAF (1993-96)
- Traffic Control School RAF (1944-45) became No. 1 Air Traffic School RAF (1945)

== Role and operations ==
=== Defence Survival Training Organisation ===
RAF St Mawgan is currently home to Defence Survival Training Organisation (DSTO), which is a tri-service unit that teaches 'Survive, Evade, Resist, Extract' (SERE) methods for the Armed Forces in support of operations and training. They also conduct trials and equipment development. It was formerly known as the School of Combat Survival and Rescue and moved to St Mawgan from RAF Mount Batten in 1992.

=== Other operations ===
The Royal Air Force maintains a small workshop on the station, enabling construction of components for the upgrading of aircraft for all three services. Accommodation on the airfield is often used by students of Agusta Westland's training facility at Newquay Airport.

Other units located here at St Mawgan are 505 (Wessex) Squadron Royal Auxiliary Air Force (RAuxAF). The gate guard was an Avro Shackleton aircraft which was sold and moved in December 2015.

From February 2016, 120 Royal Military Police (RMP) officers of the 1st Military Police Brigade, British Army, were being hosted by the base in a new police investigation unit that will be capable of managing complex police investigations. The main investigation will look at British troops' conduct in Afghanistan. Their facility, known as major incident room (MIR), will replicate the benefits of major incident rooms used by Home Office police forces when conducting complex investigations. It will use the same Home Office Large Major Enquiry System (HOLMES) for analysing and linking evidence. The RMP will come under the command of the Provost Marshal (Army). RAF St Mawgan was chosen over other locations for its availability of office and living accommodation. Married personnel and their families will be accommodated in the married quarters sites at Treloggan, St Eval (Officers) and St Columb Minor (Sergeants), which were recently renovated. Single accommodation will be provided on base in spare capacity blocks.

== Based units ==
Notable units based at RAF St Mawgan.

=== Royal Air Force ===
No. 2 Group (Air Combat Support) RAF

- No. 505 (Wessex) Squadron Royal Auxiliary Air Force

No. 22 Group (Training) RAF

- Defence Survive, Evade, Resist, Extract Training Organisation
- Air Training Corps
  - Plymouth and Cornwall Wing Headquarters
  - Regional Activity Centre

=== British Army ===
Adjutant General's Corps (Military Provost Guard Service)

- MPGS Military Provost Guard Service

== See also ==
- List of Royal Air Force stations
