= Nano-satellite Atmospheric Chemistry Hyperspectral Observation System =

Experimental 3U CubeSat program

NACHOS-2
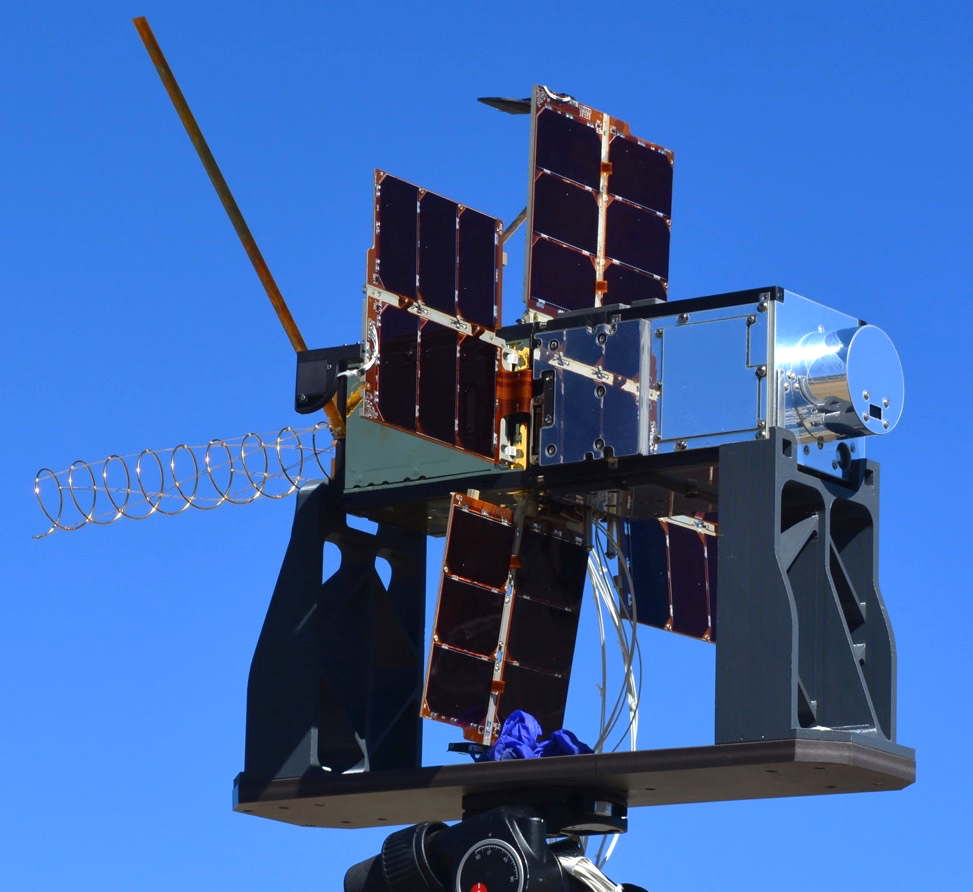
- Mission type: Technology
- Operator: Los Alamos National Laboratory (LANL)
- COSPAR ID: 2022-074B
- SATCAT no.: 52945
- Mission duration: 3 to 5 years

Spacecraft properties
- Manufacturer: Los Alamos National Laboratory (LANL)
- Launch mass: 6.25 kg

Start of mission
- Launch date: 19.02.2022

Orbital parameters
- Semi-major axis: 6586 km
- Periapsis altitude: 205.3 km
- Apoapsis altitude: 226.6 km
- Inclination: 45º
- Period: 88.7 minutes

Nano-satellite Atmospheric Chemistry Hyperspectral Observation System (NACHOS) is an experimental 3U CubeSat created by Los Alamos National Laboratory. Its purpose is to carry out high-resolution hyperspectral photography of trace gases to assist researchers studying topics such as volcanology and climate change.

== Satellites ==
There are a total of two satellites participating in this program: NACHOS-1 and NACHOS-2.

=== NACHOS-1 ===
The first satellite of the program, NACHOS-1, a Prometheus Block-2 1.5U CubeSat featuring the attached 1.5U NACHOS experiment module was launched aboard Northrup Grumman’s 17th Cygnus (spacecraft) on February 19, 2022, from Wallops Flight Facility in Wallops Island, Virginia. The Cygnus cargo craft docked to the International Space Station, delivering over 8,000 pounds of cargo, prior to raising its orbit above that of the International Space Station to deploy the satellite. The satellite was released into low Earth orbit using a NanoRacks deployer connected to the outside of the cargo craft, prior to the craft initiating a destructive re-entry.

=== NACHOS-2 ===
The NACHOS-2 satellite launched aboard a Virgin Orbit LauncherOne rocket in July 2022. This satellite has joined NACHOS-1 in orbit and will continue the mission to monitor trace gases in Earth’s atmosphere.
