= Cornwall Airport =

Cornwall Airport may refer to:

- Cornwall Regional Airport, Canada
- Newquay Airport, also known as Cornwall Airport Newquay, England
