= Space Forge =

Welsh aerospace manufacturing company

Space Forge Limited
- Type: Private
- Traded as: Space Forge
- Industry: Space industry
- Founded: 2018; 8 years ago
- Founders: Joshua Western and Andrew Bacon
- Headquarters: Cardiff, United Kingdom
- Products: ForgeStar
- Number of employees: 70 (2024)
- Website: spaceforge.co.uk

Space Forge Limited is a Welsh aerospace manufacturing company headquartered in Cardiff, Wales. Its focus is to develop reusable on-orbit fabrication capabilities to enable the novel production of semiconductors and alloys in microgravity.

== History ==
Space Forge was founded in 2018 by Joshua Western and Andrew Bacon, whilst they were working at Thales Alenia Space. In its early stages, the company started in a garage in Bristol, England, before going on to leverage the Compound Semiconductor Applications Catapult (CSAC) in Newport, Wales.

In early 2020, Space Forge secured a total of £600,000 including: £100,000 from Innovate UK; £150,000 from 12 members of the Bristol Private Equity Club and additional funds by the Development Bank of Wales. The company secured an additional £329,326 of funding from the UK government to support space manufacturing in partnership with CSAC and Clyde Space. The Development Bank of Wales announced in July 2021 that Space Forge had raised an undisclosed amount as part of a seed funding round led by Type One Ventures and Space Fund. Tarek Waked of Type One Ventures, who later joined the board of Space Forge, described this as "the largest seed round for an in-space manufacturing company to date". Investors included George T. Whitesides (former Chief Space Officer and CEO of Virgin Galactic) and Dylan Taylor (chairman and CEO of Voyager Space Holdings). The Bristol Private Equity Club increased the groups stake, with 26 members investing a total of £500,000. By this point Space Forge had 15 employees. It was later revealed that Space Forge had raised £7.6 million of initial seed capital.

By September 2021, Space Forge had moved its manufacturing base to Cardiff. In September 2021, Space Forge secured a €2 million contract from the European Space Agency for a commercial space transportation service as part of ESA's Boost! program. Space Forge intends to leverage its ForgeStar platform in the delivery of the contract and is working as part of a consortium including Clyde Space, Goonhilly Satellite Earth Station, CSAC, and the Science and Technology Facilities Council. By July 2022, the company had 40 full-time staff based in Cardiff.

In July 2024, the NATO Innovation Fund announced its support for Space Forge alongside 3 other startups. Combined with financing from the World Fund and the British Business Bank, Space Forge's Series-A brought it £22.6 million, the largest of any UK spacetech company to date.

In September 2025, Space Forge announced an MoU with US-based United Semiconductors in Los Alamitos on plans to design space-base semiconductor manufacturing equipment and the processors themselves.

== Facilities ==
Space Forge built the first satellite manufacturing facility in Wales, including a clean room and support for payload integration. The facility in Rumney, Cardiff, is 7,500 square feet (700 m^{2}) in size and was previously used in the manufacture of burger vans.

== ForgeStar ==
ForgeStar is an on-orbit manufacturing satellite platform leveraging microgravity in the production of semi-conductors and pharmaceuticals. Each vehicle will consist of an orbital module and a microgravity capsule, operating at an altitude of 300 miles (480 km) for a period of one to six months. The company aims for each satellite to be able to return from space, enable its refurbishment, and then for it to be returned to service on-orbit.

ForgeStar-0 was to be the first Welsh-built satellite and was launched by Virgin Orbit on its inaugural mission from Newquay Airport (Spaceport Cornwall), on the first ever satellite launches from the United Kingdom. This first satellite was not designed to survive reentry but was to act as a prototype to validate on-orbit manufacturing capabilities, testing the deployment of a low cost return technology. As part of this first mission, the company was to work in partnership with US based Cosmic Shielding, to test the survivability of a new composite radiation shield material known as "Plasteel". Monitoring of the material was to be provided by on board cameras. As ForgeStar-0 would return from orbit, Lumi Space was planned to trial laser tracking technology to monitor the satellite's descent through the atmosphere.

ForgeStar-0 launched on 9 January 2023 from Spaceport Cornwall. The launching rocket was the LauncherOne of Virgin Orbit. The launch ended in failure and ForgeStar-0 did not achieve orbit.

ForgeStar-1 was launched on 23 June 2025 by the SpaceX Falcon 9 rideshare mission Transporter-14. It has successfully activated its furnace at 1000°C, producing plasma and marking a further advance toward the manufacture of high performance semiconductors. The satellite is between 10 and 11 times larger than ForgeStar-0 and has been set for a safe, planned, orbital termination, meaning that it will not return to Earth.

ForgeStar-2 will be larger still, and will aim to produce materials with a value exceeding the cost of the launch. The company hopes to maintain a cadence of 10–12 flights a year.

== See also ==
- Varda Space
