= Defence Survive, Evade, Resist, Extract Training Organisation =

British military unit

- Organisation badge
- Active: 2008–present
- Country: United Kingdom
- Branch: Naval Service; British Army; Royal Air Force
- Type: Tri-service training organisation
- Role: Survive, Evade, Resist, Extract (SERE) training
- Part of: Robson Academy of Resilience
- Station: RAF St Mawgan
- Motto: Constant Endeavour

The Defence Survive, Evade, Resist, Extract (SERE) Training Organisation (DSTO), is a military training organisation based at RAF St Mawgan, Cornwall, in the United Kingdom. It is tri-service and trains personnel in survival techniques, evading capture and resistance from interrogation.

== History ==
=== Background ===
The Royal Navy and the Royal Air Force (RAF) have what has been described as a "rich history of survival training". Crews were often lost at sea during the Second World War, with an attrition rate of 80%, which prompted the training to be initiated.

Prior to the DSTO being established, the Royal Navy and the Royal Air Force provided their own survival training and the Resistance Training Wing provided the services with conduct after capture training.

==== Royal Navy ====
Before 1943, Royal Navy survival training and equipment was the responsibility of two ratings trained by the RAF. The significance of the work, however, resulted in a reorganisation whereby the Navy would train its own Survival Equipment Officers and ratings. The new Royal Navy Survival Equipment School (RNSES) initially took up residence at Eastleigh, Hampshire, before it was moved to improved accommodation at Grange Airfield (HMS Siskin) in March 1947. In 1955, the school moved to a former boys' preparatory school (Seafield Park) at Hill Head. It remained there until September 1991, when it relocated to the former Naval Aircraft Technical Evaluation Centre (NATEC) building at RNAS Lee-on-Solent (HMS Daedalus). In February 1995, the RNSES become part of the Royal Navy Air Engineering School, which was renamed to Royal Navy Air Engineering and Survival School (RNAESS). When Lee-on-Solent closed in March 1996, the RNAESS was relocated to a purpose-built building at HMS Sultan in Gosport. The unit was renamed the Survival Equipment Group and formed part of the Air Engineering and Survival Department. It remained at HMS Sultan until 2008.

==== Resistance Training Wing ====
Formerly 4 Conduct after Capture Company (4 CAC Coy), the Resistance Training Wing (RTW) was part of the now-disbanded Joint Services Intelligence Organisation (JSIO) based at Defence Intelligence Security Centre Chicksands, in Bedfordshire. The wing trained personnel resistance to interrogation techniques.

==== Royal Air Force ====
The Royal Air Force (RAF) can trace such training back to May 1943 with the formation of the School of Air/Sea Rescue, located near RAF Squire Gate, in Lancashire. The school taught RAF and USAAF crews rescue procedures and familiarisation with rescue equipment. It relocated to RAF Calshot in Hampshire in 1945, when it became the Survival and Rescue Training Unit, before moving to RAF Thorney Island in West Sussex during 1946. It disbanded in April 1949, but was replaced by the Survival and Rescue Mobile Instruction Unit (SRMIU), again at Thorney Island, in January 1950. The SRMIU would provide training to personnel during annual visits to RAF stations, but that method was considered inadequate, and in 1955, the Search, Rescue and Survival School was established as part of No. 2 Air Navigation School. The School moved to RAF Mount Batten, near Plymouth, in June 1959, when it was renamed the School of Combat Survival and Rescue (SCSR) to reflect the combat environment in which it was expected that survival and rescue skills would typically be used. RAF Mount Batten closed in 1992, with the school relocated to RAF St Mawgan, in Cornwall, where it remained until 2008.

=== Establishment ===
The Defence Survive, Evade, Resist, Extract (SERE) Training Organisation (DSTO) was created in 2008, when the RAF's School of Combat Survival and Rescue was amalgamated with the Royal Navy's Survival Equipment Group and the Resistance Training Wing. Although DSTO is a tri-service organisation, it comes under the control of No. 22 Group within RAF Air Command.

Until then, training was undertaken at three different sites across the three services at diverse locations such as Chicksands and at HMS Sultan. The Royal Air Force is the lead on aircrew-focused training for military personnel in the United Kingdom and has a second training centre (ASTC) located at RAF Cranwell, in Lincolnshire. The patron of ASTC is Ray Mears, who was in a SERE situation during filming in 2005 when his helicopter crashed in Wyoming. Mears managed to recover all of his crew to safety after the incident.

== Role and operations ==
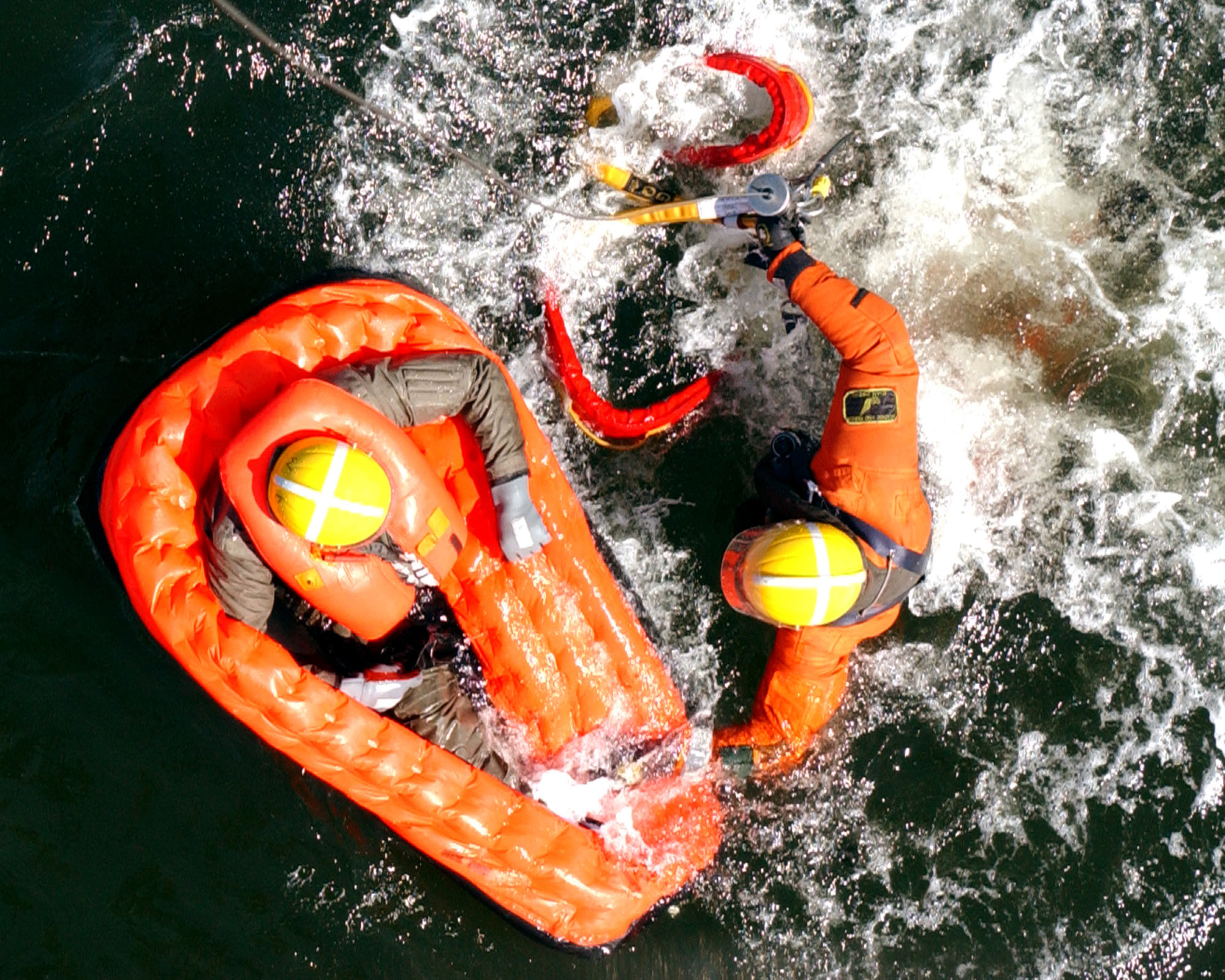
Military personnel practising survival and rescue skills.

SERE is an acronym for Survive, Evade, Resist and Extract. At a basic level, that is a core aspect of training for all UK military personnel on an annual basis. Regular Army personnel are tested as part of their Military Annual Training Tests (MATTs) as befits their frontline nature (similar processes are run by the Royal Marines and RAF Regiment) with non-frontline personnel mandated to watch a DVD detailing SERE methods.

UK armed forces personnel who train at the SERE school may be subject to methods of interrogation that are prohibited under international law. That training is carried out under strictly-controlled conditions and is delivered only to enable the trainees to understand the methods that may be used against them if they are captured by hostile forces who are not signatories of or adherents to the Geneva Convention or of international law.

SERE is mandated for all aircrew from all services and involves sea drills for those that require it. Sea drills involve jumping into the sea and spending some time adrift before hauling oneself into a dinghy from where the servicemember can be rescued. The Royal Navy and the Royal Air Force aircrews practice it with regularity. SERE training is also delivered to aircrew because the nature of their job makes them vulnerable to capture if they must bail out over or crash an aircraft into hostile territory.

== Notable students ==
- Prince William, Duke of Cambridge – went through the training as part of his survival training for being a helicopter pilot
- Prince Harry, Duke of Sussex – went through the training as part of his survival training for being a helicopter pilot
- Richard Branson – underwent the survival training as part of his world record ballooning attempt
- Guy Martin – trained at St Mawgan for his pedal-powered blimp challenge across the English Channel
- Carol Vorderman – undertook sea drills SERE training at RAF St Mawgan as part of her effort to become the ninth woman to fly solo around the world.

== See also ==
- United Kingdom Special Forces Selection
- Survival, Evasion, Resistance and Escape – an analogous program in the United States armed forces
