= Spirit of Mojave =

747 mothership for air launch hypersonic vehicle testbed

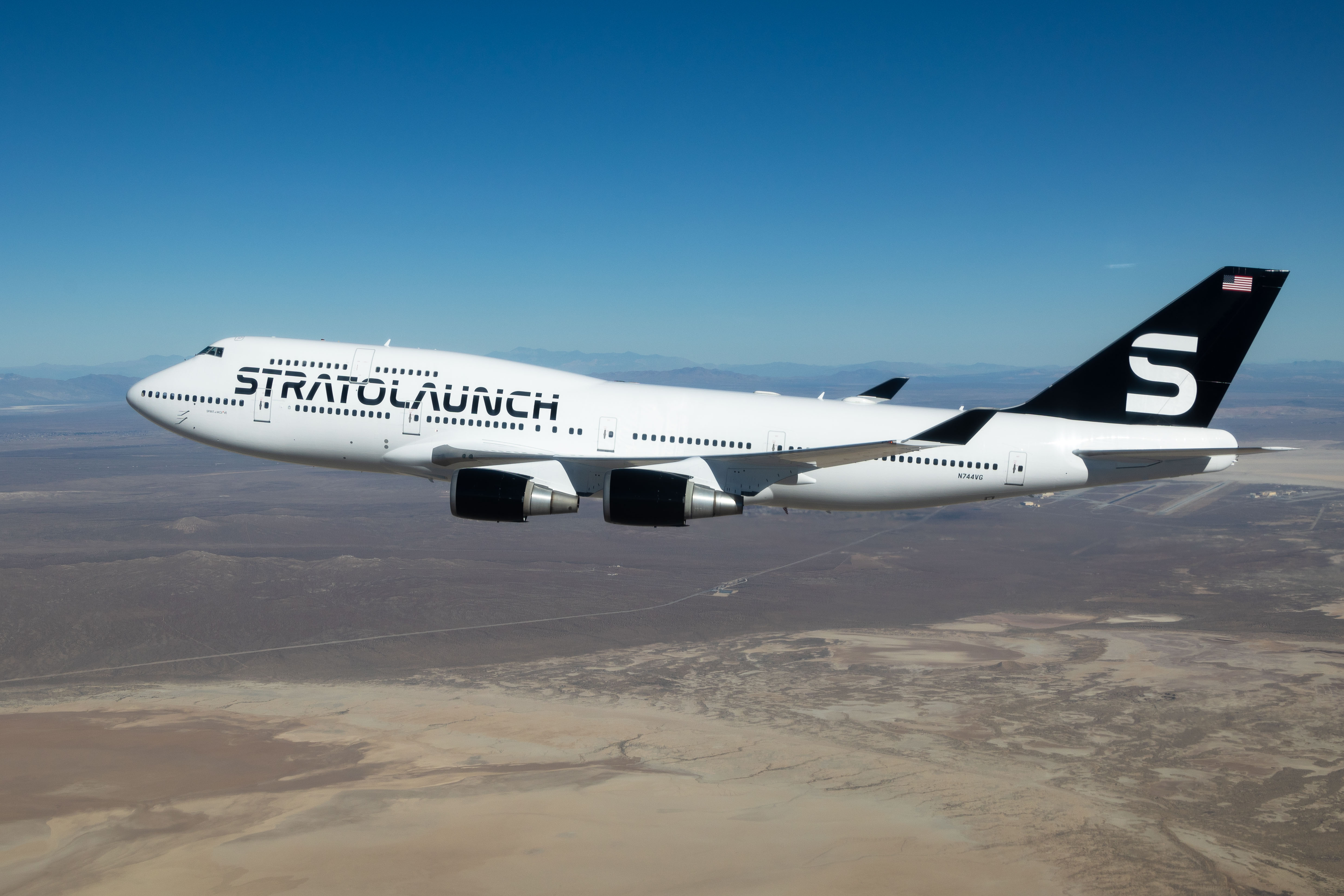
- Stratolaunch 747 Spirit of Mojave

General information
- Other names: Cosmic Girl (2001 – 2023; with Virgin Atlantic, Virgin Galactic, Virgin Orbit); Spirit of Mojave (2023 – onwards; with StratoLaunch)
- Type: Boeing 747-41R
- Manufacturer: Boeing
- Status: Expected to be refit to launch Stratolaunch's Talon.
- Owners: Virgin Atlantic (2001 – 2015); Virgin Galactic (2015 – 2017); Virgin Orbit (2017 – 2023); Stratolaunch (2023 – onwards)
- Construction number: 32745
- Registration: G-VWOW (2001 – 2015; with Virgin Atlantic); N744VG (2015 – 2023; with Virgin Galactic and Virgin Orbit and Stratolaunch); N949SL (2024 – onwards; with Stratolaunch)
- Aircraft carried: LauncherOne orbital rocket

History
- Manufactured: 2001
- First flight: 29 September 2001
- In service: 2001 – October 2015 (Virgin Atlantic); November 2015 – October 2017 (Virgin Galactic); October 2017 – May 2023 (Virgin Orbit); May 2023 - onwards (StratoLaunch)

Spirit of Mojave, previously Cosmic Girl is a Boeing 747-400 aircraft. A former passenger airliner operated by Virgin Atlantic, it was purchased by Virgin Galactic in 2015 to be used as the first stage launch platform (or mothership launch pad) for the air launch stage of the smallsat orbital launch vehicle, the LauncherOne. In 2017, the aircraft was transferred to the orbital launch subsidiary, Virgin Orbit, and its livery updated to Virgin Orbit. LauncherOne attempted its first launch on 25 May 2020; the launch was a failure. The first successful launch (second launch in total) took place on 17 January 2021.

Virgin Orbit declared Chapter 11 bankruptcy on April 4, 2023. Cosmic Girl was subsequently sold at auction to Stratolaunch, to complement their existing Roc launch platform for their Talon Hypersonic testbed vehicle, and was renamed Spirit of Mojave.

== Airliner ==
Cosmic Girl was assembled in 2001 at the Boeing Everett Factory as a Boeing 747-41R (Note: The aircraft is a Boeing 747-400 model; until 2016, Boeing assigned a unique code for each company that bought one of its aircraft, which was applied as a suffix to the model number at the time the aircraft was built, hence "747-41R" denotes a 747-400 built for Virgin Atlantic (customer code 1R).) with the serial number 32745. The aircraft's first flight was on 29 September 2001, and it was delivered to Virgin Atlantic on 31 October 2001, where she was registered as G-VWOW. She was named for the Jamiroquai song "Cosmic Girl".

On 3 November 2005, the aircraft was landing at Runway 27R at Heathrow Airport when a crosswind caused her to roll to the left, and the left-most (No. 1) engine struck the ground.

The plane was transferred to Virgin Galactic in 2015 and re-registered in the United States as N744VG. It was renamed Spirit of Mojave.

Cosmic Girl was based at Long Beach Airport. For the second operational flight of the LauncherOne vehicle, however, the plane took off for a launch (which failed) from Newquay Airport, England, on 9 January 2023.

== Launch platform ==
The jetliner was in service with the airline until October 2015. The airliner, previously leased by Virgin Atlantic, was purchased outright by Virgin Galactic, and registered as N744VG, in November 2015. A 747 was selected due to its carrying capacity. The acquisition of the 747 allowed the use of separate carrying aircraft for SpaceShipTwo and LauncherOne. With the spinoff of Virgin Orbit in 2017, Cosmic Girl was also transferred.

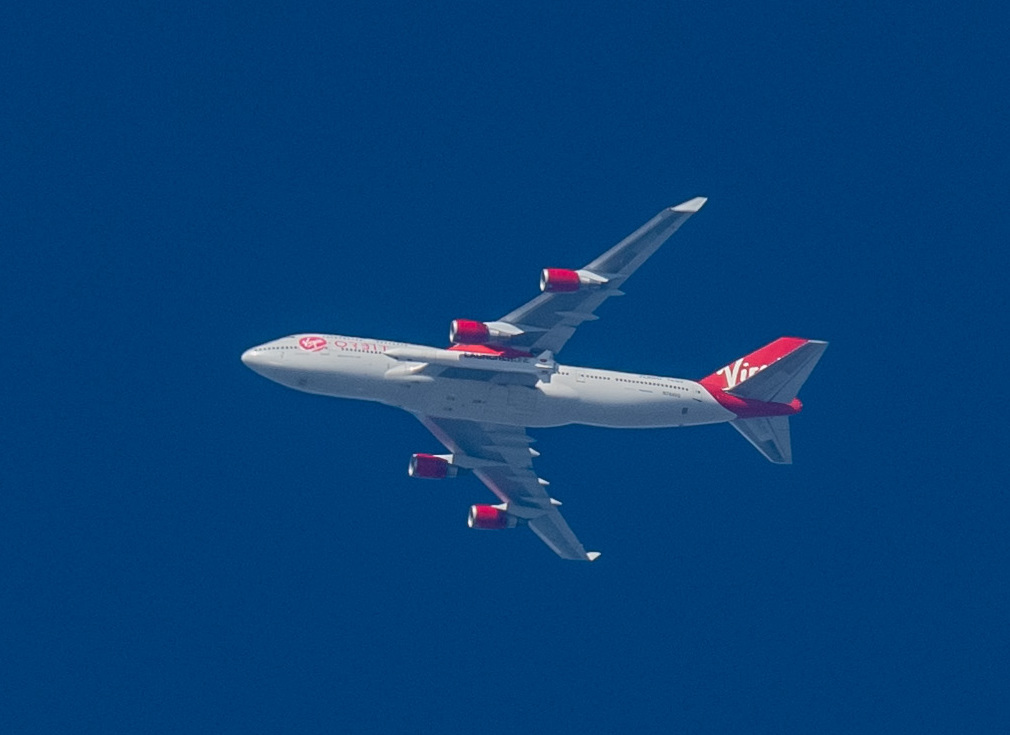
Cosmic Girl and LauncherOne on the way out to sea

The air launch to orbit LauncherOne rocket was originally envisioned to operate from the smaller airplane WhiteKnightTwo (WK2) launch platform, used for the suborbital Tier 1b system of WK2 and SpaceShipTwo (SS2). As the size of LauncherOne expanded to better encompass the marketplace and acquire marketshare of small launches, the rocket outgrew WK2, leading to the evaluation of bigger launch aircraft, and the acquisition of Cosmic Girl for LauncherOne operations. The use of a larger airplane allows doubling of LauncherOne payload capacity to 200 kilograms (440 lb), though with the selection of a 747, ultimately, 400 kilograms (880 lb) may be supported. 747s have previously been used to air launch other craft, including the Space Shuttle Enterprise. The use of Cosmic Girl marks the first use of a 747 as a space launch platform.

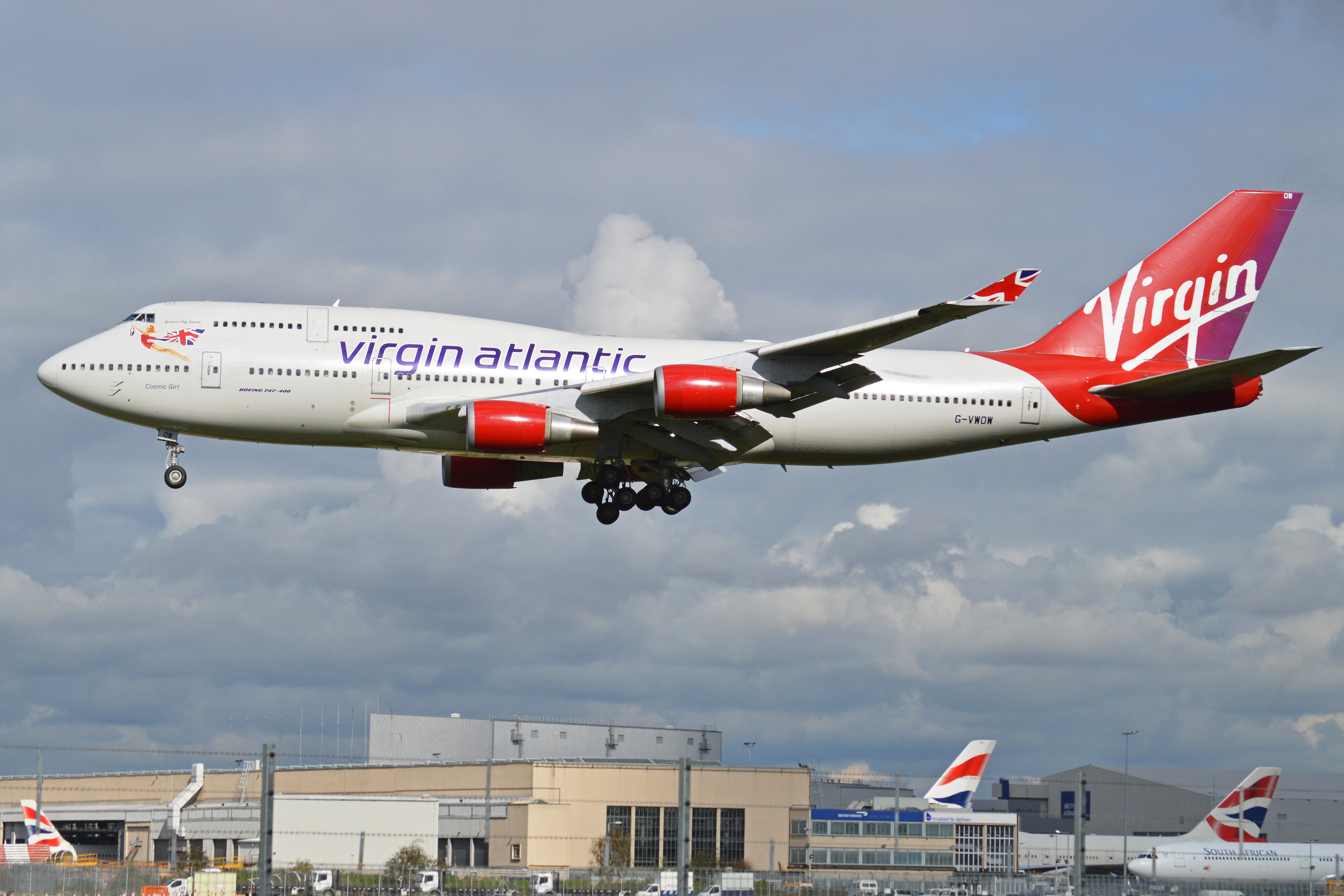
G-VWOW arriving at London-Heathrow while in service with Virgin Atlantic, October 2013

The LauncherOne attachment pylon is situated on the left wing, where on a normal 747, the fifth engine attachment point is located for ferrying engines. This point is located between the fuselage and the left inboard engine. LauncherOne would be dropped from Cosmic Girl at a height of 35,000 feet (11,000 m). The maximum payload limit for LauncherOne operations on Cosmic Girl is 400 kilograms (880 lb).

Making her first flight on 25 May 2020, a privately funded air-launched rocket, LauncherOne, developed and built by Virgin Orbit, failed to reach space after release from Cosmic Girl over the Pacific Ocean. The second launch, on 17 January 2021, successfully delivered 10 CubeSats to low Earth orbit (LEO). Virgin Orbit's third launch (and first with commercial payloads, entitled "Tubular Bells") successfully launched on 30 June 2021. Launch 4 "Above the Clouds" successfully reached orbit on 13 January 2022. Launch 5 "Straight Up" successfully reached orbit on 1 July 2022. After it was postponed several times due to regulatory issues, the sixth launch took place on 9 January 2023. The rocket failed to reach orbit. It was the first and only failure for Virgin Orbit with commercial payloads. This final launch for Virgin Orbit marked its first international launch and the first ever rocket launched from UK soil.

== See also ==
- Stargazer N140SC; the Orbital L1011 mothership for Pegasus rockets
- Balls 8 52-008; the NASA NB-52B mothership for X-15 rocket planes, lifting bodies, and Pegasus rockets
- WhiteKnightOne N318SL; the Mojave Aerospace Ventures mothership for the SpaceShipOne rocketplane
- Shuttle Carrier Aircraft N905NA; the NASA B747 mothership that was used to air launch Enterprise for test flights
