= Newquay Airport =

Airport in Cornwall, England

Cornwall Airport Newquay Ayrborth Tewynblustri

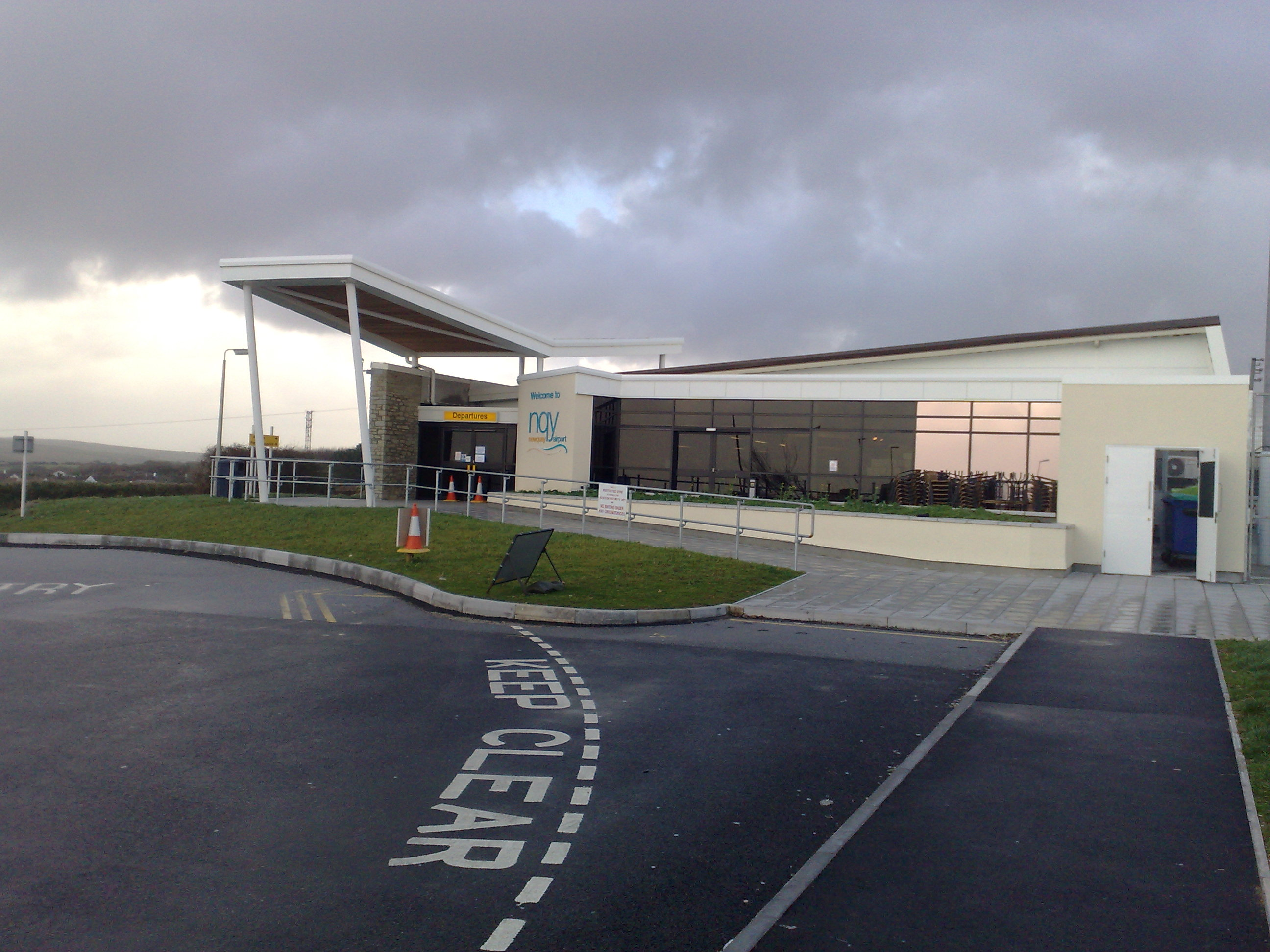
- IATA: NQY; ICAO: EGHQ

Summary
- Airport type: Public / military / commercial spaceport
- Owner: Cornwall Council
- Operator: Cornwall Airport Limited
- Serves: Newquay and Cornwall
- Location: Mawgan in Pydar, Cornwall
- Opened: 1962
- Hub for: Isles of Scilly Skybus
- Elevation AMSL: 390 ft (120 m)
- Coordinates: 50°26′27″N 004°59′43″W
- Website: cornwallairportnewquay.com

Map
- Location in Cornwall EGHQ (England) EGHQ (the United Kingdom)

Runways
Direction	Length		Surface
Direction	m	ft	Surface
12/30	2,744	9,003	Grooved asphalt

Statistics (2024)
- Passengers: 415,989
- Passenger change 2023/24: ▲1.7%
- Aircraft movements: 18,134
- Movements change 2023/24: ▼6.4%
- Sources: UK AIP at NATS; Statistics from the UK Civil Aviation Authority

Cornwall Airport Newquay (IATA: NQY, ICAO: EGHQ) (Cornish: Ayrborth Tewynblustri) is the main commercial airport for Cornwall, England, 4 1/2 miles (7 kilometres) northeast of the town of Newquay on Cornwall's north coast. Its runway was operated by RAF St Mawgan before 2008, and is now owned by Cornwall Council and operated by Cornwall Airport Limited.

The airport handled 461,300 passengers in 2017, a 24.2% increase over the previous year. Newquay has a CAA Public Use Aerodrome Licence that allows flights for the public transport of passengers or for flying instruction. The Cornwall Air Ambulance is based at the airport. Since 2012, the airport has hosted the Aerohub enterprise zone. The 2,744-metre (9,003-foot) runway can take the largest and fastest of civil and military aircraft, having been built and maintained for decades as an RAF maritime operations base. The US Navy were present with the USN AWD storage facility and Joint Maritime Facility. With the end of the Cold War and changes in American political priorities, the Americans pulled out of all involvement with the base by the end of 2009. The last RAF flying squadron based at St Mawgan was 203(R) Squadron which moved out in 2008, while part of the site continues to be used by the RAF.

The airport is also the location of Spaceport Cornwall. The facility has the capability to launch small space satellites into low Earth orbit using an air-launch-to-orbit type system.

== History ==
=== Military use ===
The airfield was opened in 1933 as a civilian facility, but was requisitioned at the outbreak of World War II and named RAF Trebelzue to support other bases in the Cornwall area. The base was renamed RAF St Mawgan in 1943, after expansion. The facility was then handed to the USAAF and there were a number of improvements, including the building of a new control tower and expansion of the current runway. The airfield was put under maintenance in 1947, and reopened as a Coastal Command base in 1951.

Since 1951, aircraft squadron which have operated at the station have included 7 Sqn., 22 Sqn., 203 Sqn. (Sea King OCU, 1996–2008); 220 Sqn (later renamed 201); 228 Sqn. (later renamed 206), both Long Range Reconnaissance Squadrons; No. 42 Squadron RAF (BAe Nimrod) (disbanded 1992), No. 236 Operational Conversion Unit RAF, the Nimrod front-line conversion-to-type unit (1970-1992). In addition, Royal Air Force Regiment squadrons No. 1 Squadron RAF Regiment and 2625 Sqn (Royal Auxiliary Air Force) were present. 2625 Sqn was disbanded on 1 November 2006, whilst 1 Sqn RAF Regt relocated to RAF Honington. The others relocated or closed. In 2005, RAF St Mawgan was one of the bases shortlisted to house the new Joint Combat Aircraft (JCA) in 2013, but in November 2005, it was announced by Minister of State for the Armed Forces Adam Ingram that the operation would be based from Scotland. Helicopter maintenance (HMF) also ceased here in late 2006.

Flying operations at RAF St Mawgan (on the opposite side of the runway to the civil terminal) ceased in December 2008.

=== Transition to fully civilian airport ===
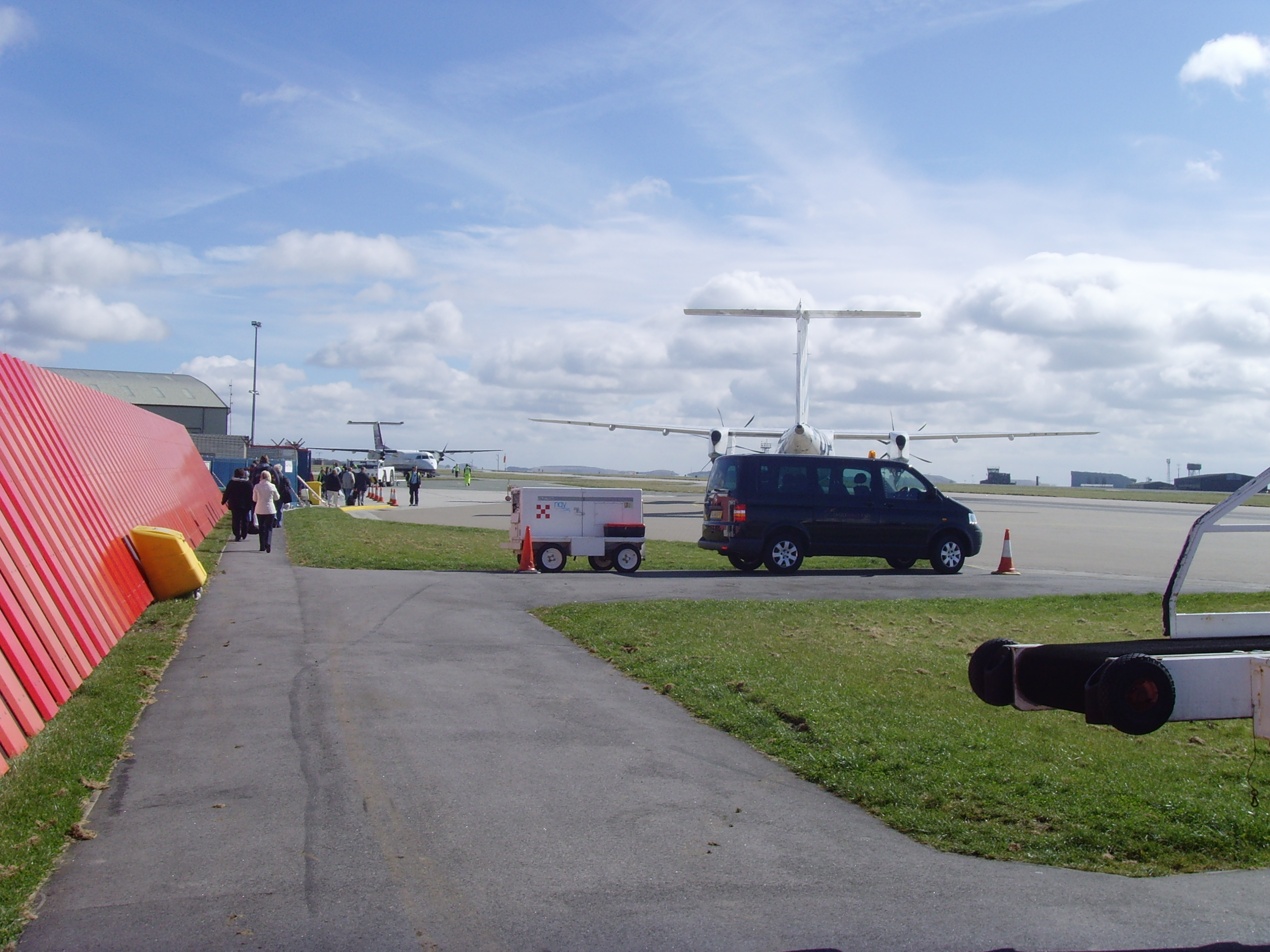
Looking over the apron at Air Southwest and Flybe turboprops at Newquay Airport in June 2007

In 2006, the airport introduced a £5 per passenger airport development fee, payable by all departing passengers via an ATM type machine prior to passing security. This resulted in Monarch Airlines axing its route from the airport (to Málaga) and in Ryanair reducing the number of flights, though this was later restored. In 2015, it was announced that the £5 development fee would be scrapped in March 2016. Before 2008, the airport operated as dual civilian/military airport, with the civilian side known as Newquay Civil Airport. In 2008, the airport closed from 1 to 19 December, to allow time for the takeover of the airfield navigation services (i.e. air traffic control) from RAF St Mawgan and to fully meet CAA standards. After further inspections by the CAA, flights recommenced on 20 December 2008.

By virtue of a statutory instrument issued on 22 September 2009, Newquay Airport is subject to current airport bylaws, per section 63 of the Airports Act 1986.

An extension opened in 2006 increased the terminal's size by 20%, allowing the airport to handle up to 450,000 passengers a year. In January 2008, Cornwall County Council approved plans for an expanded arrivals hall and departure lounge; a new retail outlet; a business lounge; and new airfield structures. In May 2008, the new arrivals and baggage reclaim area was opened; unlike the old arrivals hall, this allowed domestic and international flights to be processed simultaneously. It also added a gate to the departure lounge. The expansion of the airport was criticised in 2007 by a number of environmental groups. This opposition was based not only on environmental concerns (given that the majority of flights are short-haul and to destinations that could be served by rail), but also socio-economic concerns that airport expansion would lead to a greater demand for second homes in Cornwall, adding to already inflated local house prices.

=== Civil airport operation ===
The Irish low-cost carrier Ryanair pulled out of the airport in 2006, ceasing flights to London Stansted and Girona-Costa Brava Airport. In November 2008, Newquay Airport released its draft master plan, outlining its plans for the airport until 2030. In July 2011, the airport's main carrier, Air Southwest, announced the end of all flights from Newquay effective 30 September 2011, leaving the airport with only three year-round scheduled routes.

In May 2013, Flybe announced it would cease flying to Gatwick, leaving Newquay with year-round flights to just the Isles of Scilly and Manchester. On 2 December 2013, Flybe announced they had agreed a deal with Newquay which would secure the future of the Gatwick route until the end of October 2014, so that a public service obligation (PSO) subsidy could be finalised. Under the new deal Flybe was to operate two daily flights, with the afternoon service being dropped. Ryanair returned to the airport in April 2016, after the £5 development fee was scrapped.

On 5 March 2020, Flybe ceased trading, leaving Cornwall with no year-round direct flights to London once again. British Airways announced a six-flight-per-week summer schedule to London, commencing initially in Easter 2020. However, the COVID-19 pandemic's impacts on aviation resulted in the service launch being postponed. The service was eventually launched on 24 July 2020, albeit as a year-round service under a Public Service Obligation Emergency Order which lasts until February 2021. During this period, the Department for Transport ran a tender process for the four-year contract was to begin in March 2021.

Cornwall Council withdrew its PSO funding for the Gatwick service with Isles of Scilly Skybus's scheduled to cease operating the service on 31 May 2026. Citing high fuel prices due to the 2026 Iran war, Isles of Scilly Skybus ceased operating the service on 2 April 2026.

=== Aerohub enterprise zone ===
In August 2011, the UK government announced that the airport's bid to host an enterprise zone for aerospace businesses had been successful. The Aerohub enterprise zone was launched in April 2012. In September 2014, the UK's Homes and Communities Agency and the European Regional Development Fund agreed to fund the construction of a £6 million Aerohub Business Park. Organisations attracted to Aerohub by 2014 included Classic Air Force and the Bloodhound Land Speed Record project.

From 29 March 2013, Classic Air Force has operated from the airport using a variety of aircraft, including the world's oldest flying British jet aircraft and the only flying Gloster Meteor T7. From April 2013 until 2017, it has also operated a museum in the 70,000 square feet (6,500 m^{2}) Hangar 404, which was previously used to service the Hawker Siddeley Nimrods of RAF St Mawgan. Some of the now-closed museum's exhibits remain elsewhere on the airfield under different ownership. Since 2015, a new venture known as 'Cornwall Aviation Heritage Centre' (CAHC), was opened at the Aerohub.

Testing of Bloodhound SSC at speeds of over 200 mph (320 km/h) was performed on the runway in 2017, in preparation for a 500 mph (800 km/h) test run on its new specially created race track at Hakskeen Pan, South Africa in 2019, leading to an attempt on the land speed record in the future. Plans have been submitted to build the world's deepest artificial pool in Cornwall to train astronauts and help advance undersea robotics.

A cycle-hub is due to be built near Newquay Aerohub Business Park on council-owned land and is the result of a partnership between British Cycling, Cornwall Council and Sport England.

=== Potential future uses ===
In September 2013, the National Aeronautical Centre (NAC) at Aberporth Airport in West Wales announced that it would use Newquay as its second airport for testing unmanned aerial vehicles (UAV). The NAC said it was attracted by the length of the runway and the facilities of Aerohub. The test flights would require 3,000 square miles (7,800 km^{2}) of segregated airspace over the sea. In March 2015, the airport reported that the establishment of this segregated area had not yet been agreed with the Department for Transport, who stated that negotiations with international bodies to create an appropriate regulatory framework for UAVs were still taking place.

In July 2014, Newquay was one of eight airports shortlisted by the Civil Aviation Authority as a possible site for a British commercial spaceport. The shortlist was reduced to six airports in March 2015, with Newquay still a candidate. The selection process was abandoned in May 2016 after the Department for Transport announced it would be creating regulatory conditions allowing any suitable location wishing to become a spaceport.

== Airlines and destinations ==
The following airlines operate regular scheduled flights to and from Newquay:

Airlines	Destinations
Aer Lingus	Seasonal: Belfast–City, Dublin
easyJet	Seasonal: Geneva (begins 16 January 2027), London–Gatwick, Manchester
Edelweiss Air	Seasonal: Zurich
Eurowings	Seasonal: Düsseldorf
Isles of Scilly Skybus	Isles of Scilly (Suspended)
Loganair	Isle of Man, (Note: Isle of Man service is a continuation of the Manchester service as the same flight number) Manchester; Seasonal: Glasgow, Newcastle upon Tyne
Ryanair	Alicante, Dublin, London–Stansted, Málaga; Seasonal: Edinburgh, Faro

== Statistics ==
=== Passengers and aircraft movements ===
Cornwall Airport Newquay passenger totals 2015–2024 (thousands)

Traffic statistics at Cornwall Airport Newquay
Year	Passengers (Note: The number of domestic and international passengers handled)		Aircraft (Note: The number of all aircraft takeoffs and landings at the airport)		Freight	
Year	Numbers	% change	Numbers	% change	Tonnes	% change
2015	251,987	Steady	22,848	Steady	0	Steady
2016	371,500	▲47.4	30,417	▲33.1	2	▲ nm
2017	461,300	▲24.2	37,113	▲22.0	12	▲500.0
2018	456,888	▼1.0	41,172	▲10.9	3	▼75.0
2019	461,478	▲1.0	46,338	▲12.5	2	▼33.3
2020	67,877	▼85.3	34,398	▼25.8	2	Steady
2021	105,554	▲55.5	32,062	▼6.8	0	▼100.0
2022	244,675	▲131.8	24,625	▼23.2	0	Steady
2023	408,870	▲67.1	19,384	▼21.3	1	▲ nm
2024	415,989	▲1.7	18,134	▼6.4	1	Steady

=== Routes ===
Busiest routes to and from Newquay (2023)
Rank	Airport	Total passengers	Change 2022 / 23
1	London-Gatwick	83,948	▲30.1%
2	Manchester	75,091	▲24.3%
3	Dublin	60,453	▲247.5%
4	Faro	35,678	▲75.0%
5	Alicante	34,204	▲12.4%
6	London-Stansted	27,280	▲ New Route
7	Málaga	26,158	▲ New Route
8	Edinburgh	20,867	▲62.7%
9	Belfast-City	13,802	▲ New Route
10	Aberdeen	12,412	▼47.3%

== Spaceport Cornwall ==
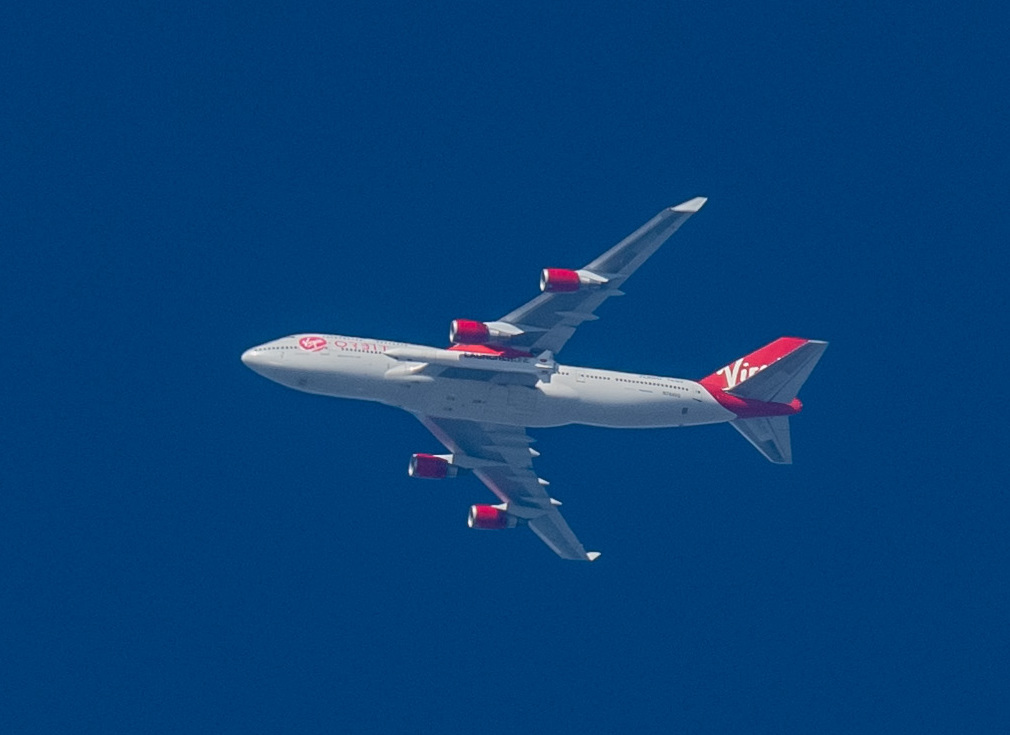
Cosmic Girl carrying LauncherOne. Only one flight of the Virgin Orbit system was carried out from Spaceport Cornwall.

=== History ===
In June 2019, the UK government and Cornwall Council announced they were prepared to invest up to £20M into the airport to create Spaceport Cornwall (Cornish: Porth Efanvos Kernow) as a base for Virgin Orbit. The system, in support of the UK space industry, would launch satellite carrying rockets to space from under the wing of a converted Virgin Atlantic Boeing 747 jumbo jet by the early 2020s dependent on the business case put forward. On 5 November 2019, the UK Space Agency announced that it would provide £7.35M to establish Virgin Orbit operations at Spaceport Cornwall.

On 30 September 2022, Spaceport Cornwall was officially launched, with the opening of their Space Systems Integration Facility (SSIF). The spaceport will also be home to the Centre for Space Technologies consisting of the SSIF and the Space Systems Operation Facility, an adjacent R&D work and office space. The spaceport, working with new businesses in the local area and the University of Exeter aim to be the first to reach Net Zero globally.

On 16 November 2022, it was announced that Spaceport Cornwall had been granted an operating licence by the Civil Aviation Authority (CAA), allowing it to send satellites into space.

As of December 2023, Spaceport Cornwall are working on system development and UK return missions with launch operators Sierra Space and Space Engine Systems. In addition, the spaceport is in discussions with an established horizontal launch provider targeting UK launches from mid-2025.

On 30 November 2025 Spaceport Cornwall was shortlisted as a potential test location for INVICTUS, a prototype hypersonic plane as part of a ESA initiative to develop hardware for a horizontally launched and landed space plane.

On 20 October, 2026, Dawn Aerospace signed a memorandum of understanding with Spaceport Cornwall to perform test flights of their Aurora unmanned suborbital space plane as part of their "Suborbital Horizontal UK Launch Programme" that could launch up to twice per day.

=== Virgin Orbit ===
The first launch from the spaceport using the Virgin Orbit LauncherOne system took place on 9 January 2023 with a payload of several small satellites. However, after being released by its carrier aircraft, the LauncherOne rocket suffered an upper stage engine anomaly at approximately 180 km (112 miles) altitude on its ascent into space, failing to achieve orbit and resulting in the loss of the payload. The flight was the only one carried out from the spaceport using the Virgin Orbit system.

After failing to secure new investment, Virgin Orbit halted operations in March 2023 and filed for bankruptcy in the US in April 2023. They later agreed to sell key assets to other aerospace companies and ceasing operations.

Flight no.	Date and time (UTC)	Rocket	Payload	Orbit	Customer	Outcome
1	9 January 2023; 23:11	LauncherOne (Flight no.6)	AMAN, CIRCE A & B, DOVER, ForgeStar-0, IOD-3 Amber, Prometheus 2A & 2B, STORK-6	Low Earth	ETCO, Dstl / NRL, RHEA Group, Space Forge, Satellite Applications Catapult, UK Ministry of Defence / NRO, SatRevolution	Failure
1	9 January 2023; 23:11	Start Me Up mission. First mission from Spaceport Cornwall. The rocket suffered an anomaly and failed to achieve orbit, falling back to Earth. Loss of payload.				

== Based units ==
Newquay airport is home to:

- Cornwall Air Ambulance since its introduction in 1987. As of 1 April 2020, the trust operates an AgustaWestland AW169.
- HM Coastguard have a small operations base and operate two Sikorsky S92 helicopters from Newquay Airport.
- HM Coastguard Also have two Beechcraft King Air B200 aircraft based at the airport, operated by 2Excel Aviation, as part of the UKSAR2G contract. These specially modified maritime patrol aircraft perform various duties such as search and rescue, counter-pollution, fisheries protection and law enforcement.
