= British commercial spaceport competition =

Plan by UK government to build a spaceport

The British commercial spaceport competition was a plan by the UK government announced in early 2014 to select a site, build a commercial spaceport, and have it in operation by 2018. Although six sites were shortlisted for possible selection by 2015, the competition was ended without a selection in May 2016 and replaced by a statement from the UK government regulatory agency that they would support rules that would allow a commercial spaceport to be built at any suitable location.

The UK-sponsored spaceport envisioned in the competition was intended to be used to launch both human-carrying flights and commercial satellite missions.

== History ==
Airfields shortlisted.

The spaceport competition was part of a broader plan announced by the government in April 2014. Earlier references and statements about a UK spaceport, with explicit statements about HTHL spaceplanes, date back at least to 2012.

A site selection process got underway in 2014. The sites of interest were principally Scottish, such as Campbeltown Airport, Glasgow Prestwick Airport, Kinloss Barracks, RAF Leuchars, RAF Lossiemouth and Stornoway Airport, but they also included Llanbedr Airport in Wales and Newquay Airport in England." The first phase of the evaluation process objective was to develop a shortlist.

=== Shortlist: early 2015 ===
The shortlist was released in March 2015, and only two airfields were ruled out. In narrowing the field, the overriding imperative of the licensing authorities was to find a location that limits danger and inconvenience to the general public. This led to all five of the short-listed locations being situated in coastal areas. The government ruled out two airfields in its consultation process: RAF Lossiemouth and Kinloss Barracks, in Scotland, due to operational defence reasons.

The shortlist locations selected were:

- Campbeltown Airport
- Glasgow Prestwick Airport
- Stornoway Airport
- Newquay Airport
- Llanbedr Airport
- RAF Leuchars was confirmed as a potential temporary facility.

Only five sites remained in the competition as of April 2016. The RAF Leuchars site had been removed from the shortlist prior to that time.

=== End of competition: 2016 ===
The competition was ended in May 2016, prior to the selection of any single spaceport location. Instead, the Department for Transport announced that the regulatory rules would be modified so that "any suitable location" might become a spaceport.

== See also ==
- Launch pad
- List of rocket launch sites
- List of spaceports
- Spaceport
