= Cornwall Air Ambulance =

English charity air ambulance

Cornwall Air Ambulance Trust
- Founded: April 1987
- Type: Charitable organisation
- Location: Newquay Airport, Cornwall, England
- Coordinates: 50.4329°N 4.9838°W
- Region served: Cornwall; Isles of Scilly
- Aircraft operated: Leonardo AW169
- Patron: Queen Camilla
- Key people: Tim Bunting (CEO); Colonel Sir Edward Bolitho (President); Barbara Sharples (Vice President)
- Revenue: £8.6 million (2024)
- Staff: 57 (2024)
- Volunteers: 250 (2024)
- Website: cornwallairambulancetrust.org

The Cornwall Air Ambulance Trust is a registered charity that provides a dedicated helicopter emergency medical service (HEMS) for Cornwall and the Isles of Scilly. The service operates a Leonardo AW169 helicopter and two critical care cars that are utilised when the helicopter is unable to fly. Together they attend about 1,100 incidents per year. As of December 2018, the helicopter service had flown over 28,000 missions since 1987.

When introduced on 1 April 1987, Cornwall's air ambulance was the first dedicated HEMS operational in the United Kingdom. The helicopter enables a fast response to the most critically ill or injured and can facilitate access to isolated locations, such as beaches, cliff-tops and moorland areas, which are less accessible by road.

== Operations ==
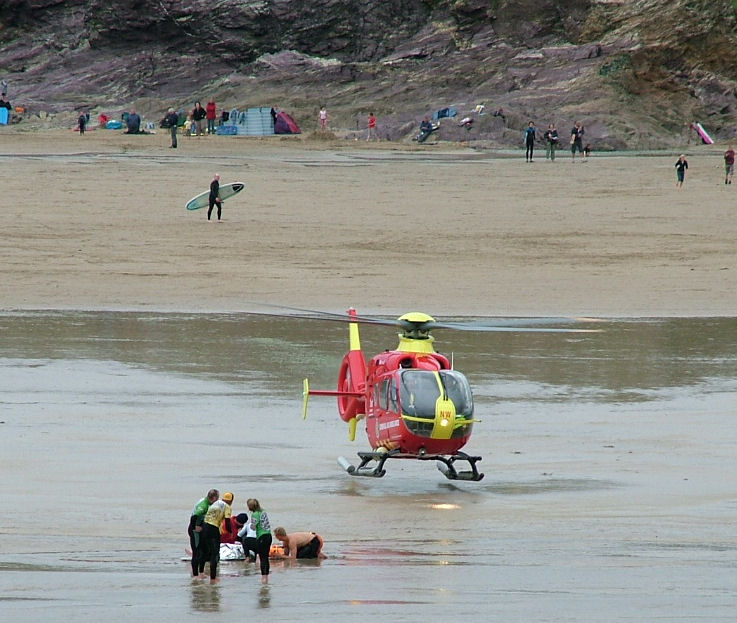
Landing on Polzeath beach, August 2008

The service is based at a hangar at Newquay Airport (EGHQ), The helicopter can be airborne within two minutes of an emergency call and flies at 145 knots (167 mph; 269 km/h). It can cover the entire county in an average of 12 minutes and reach the Isles of Scilly in 28 minutes.

The clinical hub for South Western Ambulance Service (SWASFT) makes decisions regarding mobilisation of this and the other five air ambulances provided by four different charities within the SWASFT coverage area.

== Aircrew ==
The air ambulance carries a crew of three: one pilot plus either two critical care paramedics, or a critical care paramedic and a doctor. Paramedics are selected from the ambulance service and specially trained for their work on the helicopter. The training period is a minimum of one year which includes critical care practice and a postgraduate certificate as part of the MSc in pre-hospital critical care/retrieval and transport. Successful trainees are then confirmed in role as specialist paramedics in critical care (SPCC) but are more commonly referred to as critical care paramedics (CCP). They are additionally trained as helicopter technical crewmembers, responsible for air to ground communications as well as navigation and assisting the pilot in flight as required. The service has a number of full-time aircrew paramedics and doctors.

== Aircraft ==
=== Messerschmitt Bölkow-Blohm Bo 105 ===
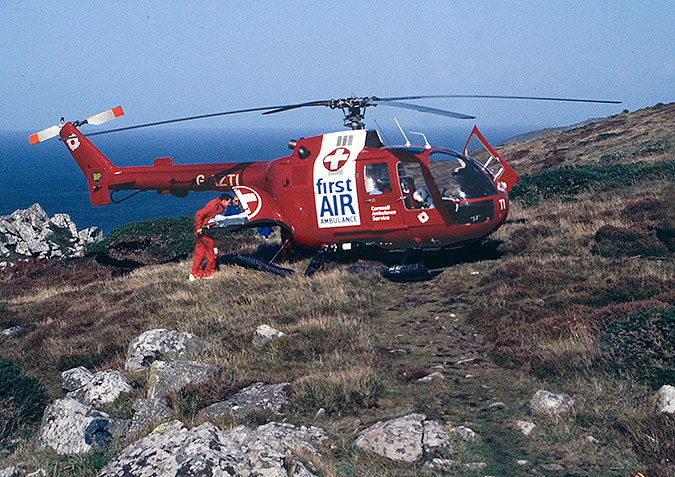
Cornwall previous Bo105

The first helicopter was a MBB Bo 105D (registration G-AZTI) which was replaced by a slightly larger Bo 105 (registration G-CDBS) which was used until 2001.

=== Eurocopter EC135 ===
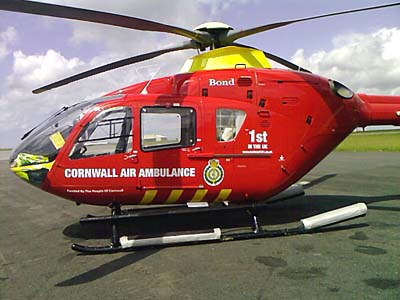
The former Cornwall Air Ambulance - G-KRNW - a Eurocopter EC135

The next helicopter, Eurocopter EC135T, is still used extensively as an air ambulance around the world. G-KRNW had a cruising speed of 160 mph (260 km/h). The EC135 was replaced in 2014 after 13 years in service.

=== MD Helicopters MD 902 ===
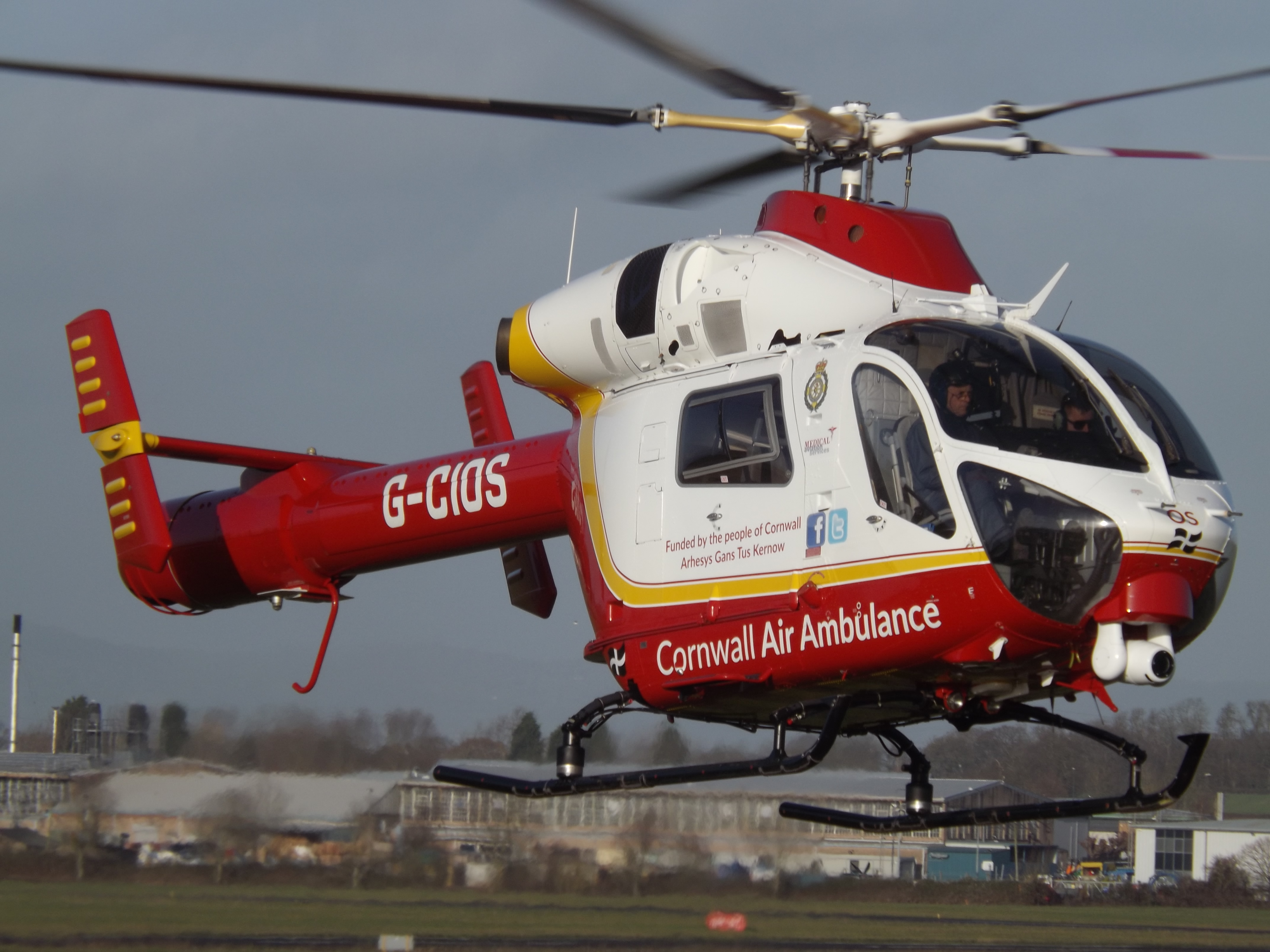
G-CIOS, a MD 902 of Cornwall Air Ambulance

In late 2014, the aircraft provider changed from Bond Helicopters to Specialist Aviation Services (SAS), who owned, operated and maintained the helicopters. The service then changed to the MD 902 Explorer, which features a no tail rotor (NOTAR) design. As part of the contract the service then had two helicopters (registration G-CNWL and G-CIOS): one on operational readiness, the other on immediate standby in case of engineering requirements or non-availability of the primary aircraft. Both MD 902 helicopters were delivered as night capable for HEMS operations in darkness. In 2015, the helicopter was available for 12 hours of the day, a first for the air ambulance service in Cornwall. This meant that during winter months the helicopters were available even during darker hours, thanks to the use of special night vision goggles mounted on the pilot's helmet.

=== Leonardo AW169 ===
As of August 2025, the charity nowoperates a pair Leonardo AW169 helicopter (G-CRWL) and (G-CNLL), replacing both of the MD902 Explorer aircraft. The AW169 is owned by the charity, and operated/maintained by Castle Air. Reasons for choosing the new aircraft included double the fuel range reducing the need to refuel between missions, a greater cruising speed and being able to carry more medical supplies. The AW169 was officially unveiled in July 2020 by Camilla, Duchess of Cornwall, the charity's patron and after whom the aircraft is named.

In November 2023, the charity announced their new 'Heli2 Appeal', seeking to raise £2.85 million by the end of 2024 in order to buy a second AW169. By July 2024, the appeal had raised over £1 million. The new aircraft (reg G-CNLL) entered service in August 2025 and was later named The Duke of Cornwall by Queen Camilla during a visit to the Newquay airbase in September 2025.

== Finances ==
In the year ending 31 December 2024, the charity's income was £8.6 million. Expenditure was £7.5M, of which £5.7M (76%) was charitable spending on the air ambulance service. The charity has 57 employees, of which seven are paid between £60,000 and £100,000 a year. Operational costs included pilots, service engineers, and insurances; as well as per-hour flying costs including fuel, spares, and servicing. The cost of the critical care paramedics is shared with their employer SWASFT.

Cornwall Air Ambulance is a charitable organisation solely maintained by donations as it usually receives no form of official funding, although in its 2022/2023 financial year it received three government grants totalling £146,000, comprising Libor fines and capital purchase grants, which were used towards the purchase of the new AW169 helicopter. Members of the public finance the air ambulance by donations, various fund-raising events, purchase of weekly lottery tickets and legacies.

== See also ==
- Air ambulances in the United Kingdom
- Devon Air Ambulance
- Healthcare in Cornwall
