= Space Engine Systems =

Canadian aerospace company

Space Engine Systems Inc.
- Type: Private
- Industry: Aerospace
- Founded: 2012
- Headquarters: Edmonton, Alberta, Canada,
- Key people: Pradeep Dass (President)
- Products: SSTO propulsion systems, pumps, compressors, gear boxes, Permanent Magnet Motors
- Website: SpaceEngineSystems.com

Space Engine Systems Inc. (SES) is a Canadian aerospace company and is located in Edmonton, Alberta, Canada. The main focus of the company is the development of a light multi-fuel propulsion system (DASS Engine) to power a reusable spaceplane and hypersonic cruise vehicle. Pumps, compressors, gear boxes, and other related technologies being developed are integrated into SES's major R&D projects. SES has collaborated with the University of Calgary to study and develop technologies in key technical areas of nanotechnology and high-speed aerodynamics.

== Company history ==
Space Engines Systems Inc. was established in 2012 to develop the DASS engine and related technologies in the aerospace sector. Space Engine Systems's promoters have been involved in the development of the engine for over 20 years. work together to bring novel pumps, compressors, and gearbox systems to the aerospace industry as spin off applications. On May 10, 2012, SES publicly announced the launch of their company at the Farnborough Air Show (July 9–15, 2012). On August 6, they announced their participation in the AUVSI's Unmanned Systems North America. SES frequently attends major international trade shows in the aerospace sector including the Paris Air Show in 2013, 2015, and 2017 and the Farnborough Air Show in 2014, 2016, and 2024.

== DASS engine ==
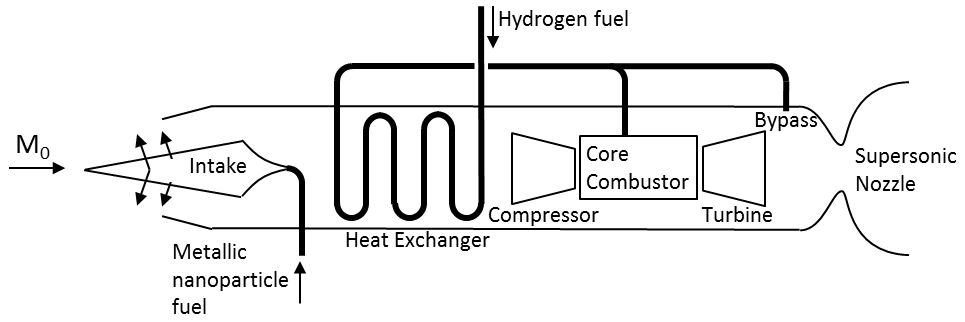
The DASS GN 1 engine concept

The DASS engine is a pre-cooled combined cycle propulsion concept that can produce thrust over a wide range of vehicle flight Mach numbers (rest to hypersonic). Derivatives of the engine can be used for propulsion of an SSTO vehicle, long-range missiles, and hypersonic transport aircraft. The engine is being developed with the flexibility for various vehicles and mission profiles. The concept uses existing aerospace technologies, including conventional gas turbine components, and new developments in nanotechnology to overcome some of the key technical obstacles associated with overheating and fuel storage. In high-speed flight, the incoming air has a very high dynamic pressure and aerodynamic deceleration results in a rise in static pressure and temperature. Temperatures can rise above the material limits of the compressor blades in a conventional turbojet. A strategy to alleviate this problem is to place a heat exchanger downstream of the inlet in order to reduce gas temperatures prior to mechanical compression. Similar to the deep-cooled turbojet or the liquefied air cycle engine (LACE), energy extracted from the incoming air in the DASS engine is added back into the system downstream as sensible heat in the fuel stream.

The DASS engine concept improves upon the heat exchange process in multiple ways. Surface nano-coatings are placed on the internal heat exchangers to enhance convective heat transfer rates, reduce heat exchanger mass, and reduce unwanted aerodynamic blockage. Metallic nanoparticles are seeded into the intake air from the inlet cone to further enhance heat transfer. The particles act as a supplemental fuel and assist the operation of flow control devices downstream. It is known that metallic fuels have desirable storage properties in comparison to hydrogen and have excellent energy densities on a per volume basis. A combination of hydrogen and nanoparticles of Boron are being considered as the engine's fuel.

The main advantage of the DASS engine over conventional rocket engines for high-speed flight is the use of atmospheric oxygen in its air-breathing mode. The specific impulse (I_{sp}) of air-breathing engines are superior to rockets over a wide range of Mach numbers. These gains have the potential to realize a larger payload mass fraction (e.g. 4% for NASP to LEO vs 2.6% for Soyuz-2 to LEO). The higher I_{sp} associated with air-breathing engines is a major motivation for the development of supersonic combustion ramjet engines. Airbreathing engines typically have a lower thrust-to-weight ratio compared to rockets. That is why the DASS engine will be integrated into a lifting-body vehicle. For an SSTO vehicle, reduced vehicle mass and increased payload mass fraction translates to lower operation costs. For transport, the ability to travel at hypersonic speeds drastically decreases the time required to cover long distances. The altitude at which hypersonic cruise vehicles operate is usually much higher than conventional transporters (30 km for A2 vs 13.1 km for A380). The lower air density at these higher altitudes reduces the overall vehicle drag, which further improves efficiency. Current research and development is focused on engine operation at Mach 5 cruise at an altitude of 30 km. Note that 30 km is still significantly lower than what is considered to be the edge of space (100 km) and much lower than low Earth orbit (~200 km). Therefore, for the DASS Engine to operate beyond the target 30 km and Mach 5 operating conditions, the design will be modified. At higher altitudes the air density decreases and the vehicle must travel faster to achieve a sufficient inlet mass capture. At even higher altitudes, the DASS engine will need to store onboard oxidizer to be used with a rocket motor in its flow path. The target is to achieve a major component of orbital velocity when operating in the airbreathing mode before switching to the rocket mode.

=== Engine details ===
At low flight speeds the DASS engine relies solely on the on-board turbojet that runs on a conventional hydrocarbon fuel. The variable geometry intake (PCT patent pending) allows large gaps to form between the heat exchanger (which is not operating at this stage), minimizing intake pressure losses. During this mode, the bypass is closed and all air is processed through the turbojet core. The exhaust nozzle (PCT patent pending) contracts in the subsonic mode for optimal specific thrust. As the engine accelerates to supersonic velocities, the articulated portions of the intake direct flow into the heat exchanger (PCT patent pending). Liquid hydrogen fuel is passed through the heat exchanger, decreasing the temperature of the air prior to engine compression. Some of the air bypass the turbojet core, and is mixed with the hydrogen exiting the heat exchanger in the afterburner section. Note that the magnitude of heat transfer is coupled to the amount of hydrogen available for combustion in the afterburner. The combustion products are then expanded through a supersonic nozzle, variable geometry nozzle. The engine will be designed to completely consume the air to optimize for thrust. The level of bypass changes throughout the supersonic flight regime. The engine can operate at Mach 4 and provide thrust in excess of a conventional ramjet. At high Mach numbers (~4.88) air cannot be cooled below the turbojet limit (1200K). As a result, no combustion can occur in the core turbojet and the engine must transition into a pure ramjet mode. The variable inlet continues to articulate (PCT patent pending) to completely block air access to the turbojet, while optimizing intake to exit area ratios for ramjet combustion using hydrogen. The engine still realizes an efficiency boost from the cooling effects of the heat exchanger (albeit much less in this mode). The terminal flight speed is limited to that of a hydrogen fueled ramjet.

The goals of the DASS GN X and DASS GN1 engines are to provide efficient thrust from rest up to hypersonic speeds (M~5) and high altitudes (h~30 km) with a low specific fuel consumption along the entire flight path, and a small rocket stage to bring the vehicle into orbit. The engine will operate on multiple fuels (hydrogen, hydrocarbons, and metallic fuels). Each type of fuel has an advantage. The hydrocarbon fuel is typically used in turbojet/turbofan engines, which are considered mature/conventional technology. This engine will provide thrust at low-speeds. Hydrogen has a large heat capacity (~14 kJ/kgK), so it is an excellent heat sink for the heat exchanger (patent pending). It also has the best energy content per unit mass of any fuel and is a light molecule. As a result, it can provide large thrust levels with a low specific fuel consumption. Metallic fuel has excellent storage qualities, high energy content per unit volume, and can assist in convective heat transfer. It also has good combustion properties at nano-scale.

Key technology components of the DASS GN 1 and DASS GN X are quite similar. The DASS GN1 is meant exclusively for aerospace and the DASS GN X is meant for space applications only. An engine prototype is planned for ground and flight testing.

=== Engine comparison ===
The table below shows a comparison of the DASS engine to more conventional high-speed engines (Ramjet) at two Mach numbers. Two types of Ramjets were considered. The first Ramjet uses a combination of fuels (Kerosene and hydrogen) in similar proportions as the DASS engine. The second Ramjet uses pure hydrogen. It is clear that at the lower Mach number, the DASS engine provides a higher specific thrust. This is due to higher pressure that can be utilized by the turbojet. At Mach 4 the DASS GN1 performs similarly to a ramjet. At this speed, the DASS GN1 engine would likely convert to a pure ramjet. The specifications listed do not include any gains that might be realized through heat transfer on the intake cone (PCT patent pending), or from the combustion of metallic fuel. A typical rocket specific impulse is between 250 – 500 seconds.

Engine Comparison at Mach = 2
Engine (10 km)	Specific Thrust (m/s)	Specific Fuel Consumption (g/kNs)	T_{max}/T_{o}	P_{max}/P_{o}	I_{sp} (s)
DASS GN1	4.23	30.9	15.1	23.9	3299
Kerosene/H_{2} Ramjet	3.41	38.4	15.1	6.0	2654
H_{2} Ramjet	3.44	28.5	15.6	6.0	3569

Engine Comparison at Mach = 4
Engine (28 km)	Specific Thrust (m/s)	Specific Fuel Consumption (g/kNs)	T_{max}/T_{o}	P_{max}/P_{o}	I_{sp} (s)
DASS GN1	3.67	30.0	17.8	228	3410
Kerosene/H_{2} Ramjet	3.64	30.1	17.8	57	3383
H_{2} Ramjet	3.65	26.9	18.0	57	3786

=== Ground Testing Facility ===
Space Engine Systems is developing a ground testing facility capable of simulating high temperature inlet flow at high altitudes associated with supersonic flight. The facility, named the Multi-Fuel Jet Engine testing facility, is highly modular and can easily be adapted for many applications. The facility includes:

• Direct Connect System to supply high temperature air flow to the engine to simulate supersonic air flow up to Mach 5.

• Fuel System to supply multiple fuels to the engine, including liquid hydrogen, jet fuel, and solid nano-particles.

• Measurement Suite to allow data collection and analysis of all tested equipment.

The Multi-Fuel Jet Engine testing facility can be used to better understand:

• Pre-cooled combined cycle propulsion

• Temperature limitations of various turbine engine materials/components

• Multi-fuel combustion (conventional, solid, and rocket fuels)

• Multi-fuel afterburners

• Engine start modes at high altitude

• Thrust characteristics at high altitude

• By-pass ratio control

• Engine test-stand and mounting mechanisms

• Flow characteristics

=== Incorporation of nanotechnology ===
One of the main challenges is to develop a technique to inject the nano-particles in a manner which promotes homogeneous mixing. Second, characterize the heat transfer properties of the flow mixture.

Only a small amount of nanoparticles are required to provide the heat transfer gains required by the engine. It was found that even with very small mass loadings (0.1%), large gains in heat transfer can be achieved (40%). Therefore, it is feasible to use the available hydrogen as a carrier for the particles. Care must be taken to ensure that the hydrogen content stays below the lean flammability limit to prevent uncontrolled ignition before reaching the combustor. A 1:1 mass ratio mixture of nanoparticles and hydrogen will be injected into freestream to achieve 0.1% mass loading of nanoparticles and hydrogen in air. The injected mixture will cool the freestream air such that a gain in stagnation pressure is realized as the flow decelerates inside of the engine. Not only does heat transfer occur from the particles to the air, heat transfer will also occur along in the intake cone surface.

Some nanoparticles outperform hydrogen (per unit volume) and hydrocarbons (per unit mass and volume) in terms of energy storage. Two important metrics are the energy per unit mass and energy per unit volume. Vehicles are usually designed on a per unit volume basis (for drag considerations). On a per unit volume basis, Boron outperforms both hydrogen and hydrocarbons. On a per unit mass basis, Boron outperforms hydrocarbon fuels but is not as good as hydrogen. Therefore, the DASS engines will take advantage of the excellent properties of Boron along with hydrocarbon, and hydrogen fuels.

=== Heat exchanger ===
The proposed structure of the heat exchanger is a nano-porous foam. The foam will strengthen the nano-porous structure while maximizing the heat transfer and minimizing the pressure drop. This in combination with the added effect of nano-particle dispersion should allow for a smaller heat exchanger.

== Research ==
Major technology hurdles for the DASS engine are related to the implementation of nanotechnology in the engine components. In a partnership with the University of Calgary, SES will assess the feasibility of using surface nano-coatings on the heat exchangers, study the effect of nanoparticle suspensions on convective heat transfer, and assess the feasibility of using metallic nanoparticles as a supplemental fuel. The Canadian Government (through NSERC funding) is also a partner in the DASS Engine project.

=== Surface nano-coatings on heat exchangers ===
Coating a solid body with nano-particles has been shown in the scientific literature to enhance the convective heat transfer rate from solid bodies. Several mechanisms have been proposed, including the increase in the overall surface area associated with nano-coating. Essentially, it is possible that the nanoparticles act as small scale fins, which are known to improve heat exchanger effectiveness. Since these nano-scale fins are small, the pressure drop is also much less than when compared to the pressure losses of a large scale fin. This reduces the work requirements in pumping or compressing the fluid as it passes through the heat exchanger. The presence of surface roughness associated with nanoparticle deposits also promotes mixing, which directly affects convective heat transfer.

=== Nanoparticle suspensions for heat transfer ===
The suspension of a large amount of small scale solid particles in a gas results in a large surface-area-to-volume ratio. Studies in the scientific literature have shown that there is a unique interaction between the properties of solid nanoparticles and those of carrier fluid. The result, which is not observed with larger scale particles (i.e. micron), is the alteration of the properties of the bulk fluid. For example, Lee et al. (1999) and Wang et al. (1999) have shown, experimentally, that the suspension of 24 and 23 nm diameter CuO particles in water enhance the thermal conductivity of water by 34%. SES will investigate the potential enhancement of the thermal conductivity of gases with suspended nanoparticles.

=== Nanoparticle combustion ===
Metal powders have been considered as alternative fuels for air-breathing engines because of their large energy content per unit mass and per unit volume in comparison to liquid hydrocarbon fuels. Although hydrogen has a larger energy content per unit mass than metal fuels, hydrogen fuel needs to be stored at very high pressures, cooled cryogenically, or absorbed in other materials in order to accumulate a practical amount of mass. In contrast, metal particles can be packed and stored efficiently and safely. Since the overall rate of combustion is proportional to surface area, the use of smaller scale particles can improve combustion and increase engine performance. It has been found that nanoparticles typically have a lower melting point, ignite at lower temperatures, and have a higher burning rate than larger scale particles. Therefore, the use of a particle fuel or a particle supplement to a conventional fuel is being considered in SES's new aero-engine design.

== Specialized products and services ==
Working with the CAN-K Group of Companies, SES offers a selection of aerospace components and services. All manufacturing is done to AS 9100 C and ISO 9001 quality management standards. Products include:

- Specialized planetary gear box (ultra-light) with capability to run up to 420 deg Celsius ambient temperature (tested for 45 minutes under full load and oil completely pulled out by vacuum). No metallurgical or mechanical damage;
- High-speed gear box for turbine engines;
- Efficient and light heat exchanger;
- Liquid/multiphase twin screw and three screws pump for aerospace/space applications;
- Hydraulic multiple screw pumps for automatic torque changer or other aerospace applications;
- Drive systems with sophisticated constant velocity (CV) joints;
- Custom bearings (hydrodynamic and hydrostatic);
- High temperature bearings;
- Vacuum operational equipment (custom designed);
- Double rotor system rotating in opposite directions adaptable for helicopter applications;
- Permanent Magnet motor system adaptable for aerospace and space requirements;
- Custom light weight and high temperature materials;
- Aerospace and space sub-assemblies custom made to customer's requirements;
- DASS Lander for space applications; and
- Nano oil for long term use.
