= LauncherOne =

Two-stage, air-launched rocket by Virgin Orbit

- LauncherOne diagram
- Manufacturer: Virgin Orbit
- Country of origin: United States
- Project cost: US$700 million
- Cost per launch: US$12 million

Size
- Height: Approx. 21.3 m (70 ft)
- Mass: Approx. 30 tons
- Stages: 2

Capacity

Payload to 500 km SSO
- Mass: 300 kg (660 lb)

Payload to 230 km LEO
- Mass: 500 kg (1,100 lb)

Associated rockets
- Family: Air launch to orbit
- Comparable: Electron, Vector-H, Falcon 1, Pegasus

Launch history
- Status: Retired
- Launch sites: Mojave Air and Space Port, California; Newquay Airport, United Kingdom
- Total launches: 6
- Success(es): 4
- Failure: 2
- First flight: 25 May 2020
- Last flight: 9 January 2023

First stage
- Diameter: 1.8 m (5 ft 11 in)
- Powered by: NewtonThree (N3)
- Maximum thrust: Vacuum: 326.8 kN (73,500 lb_{f})
- Burn time: Approx. 180 seconds
- Propellant: RP-1/LOX

Second stage
- Diameter: 1.5 m (4 ft 11 in)
- Powered by: NewtonFour (N4)
- Maximum thrust: Vacuum: 22.2 kN (5,000 lb_{f})
- Burn time: Approx. 360 seconds
- Propellant: RP-1/LOX

LauncherOne was a two-stage orbital launch vehicle developed and flown by Virgin Orbit that had operational flights from 2021 to 2023, after being in development from 2007 to 2020. It was an air-launched rocket, designed to carry smallsat payloads of up to 300 kg (660 lb) into Sun-synchronous orbit (SSO), following air launch from a carrier aircraft at high altitude. The rocket was carried to the upper atmosphere on a modified Boeing 747-400, named Cosmic Girl, and released over ocean. Initial work on the program was done by Virgin Galactic, another Virgin Group subsidiary, before a separate entity — Virgin Orbit — was formed in 2017 to complete development and operate the launch service provider business separately from the passenger-carrying Virgin Galactic business.

The first successful flight was on 17 January 2021, which delivered a payload of 10 CubeSats to low Earth orbit (LEO). Three further launches successfully reached orbit. An initial test flight was unsuccessful on 25 May 2020, when the rocket failed to reach space. The final flight on 9 January 2023 also failed to reach orbit.

LauncherOne was the first all liquid-fuelled air-launched orbital rocket.

From 2007 to 2015, Virgin had intended LauncherOne to be a somewhat smaller vehicle with a 200 kg (440 lb) payload to low Earth orbit. In 2015, Virgin modified the vehicle design to better target their intended market, and increased the vehicle payload capacity to 300 kg (660 lb) launched to a 500 km (310 mi) Sun-synchronous orbit, suitable for CubeSats and small payloads. Virgin Orbit targeted a launch price around US$12 million for the rocket.

With Virgin Orbit shutting down all operations after bankruptcy in 2023, the vehicle is unlikely to see additional launches.

== History ==
Virgin Galactic began working on the LauncherOne concept in 2007, and the technical specifications were first described in some detail in late 2009. The LauncherOne configuration was proposed to be an expendable, two-stage, liquid-fueled rocket air-launched from a White Knight Two carrier aircraft. This would make it a similar configuration to that used by Orbital Sciences' Pegasus, or a smaller version of the StratoLaunch air-launched rocket system.

By 2012, several commercial customers had signed early contracts for launches signaling demand-side support for new small commercial-oriented launch vehicles. These included GeoOptics, Skybox Imaging, Spaceflight Services, and Planetary Resources. Both Surrey Satellite Technology and Sierra Nevada Space Systems were at the time reported to be developing satellite buses "optimized to the design of LauncherOne". In October 2012, Virgin announced that LauncherOne would be designed so that it could place 200 kg (440 lb) in Sun-synchronous orbit (SSO). Virgin planned at the time to market the 200 kg (440 lb) payload delivery to Sun-synchronous orbit for under US$10 million per mission, while the maximum payload for low Earth orbit (LEO) missions would be somewhat larger at 500 kg (1,100 lb).

Under plans announced in 2012, the second stage was to be powered by NewtonOne, a 16 kN (3,600 lb_{f}) thrust engine, and the first stage by a scaled-up version called NewtonTwo, with 211 kN (47,000 lb_{f}) of thrust. Design and construction of the first engines was completed by 2014. NewtonOne was tested up to a full-duration burn of five minutes. NewtonTwo made several short-duration firings by early 2014. Ultimately, however, neither NewtonOne nor NewtonTwo would be used on LauncherOne.

In 2015, Virgin Galactic established a 14,000 m^{2} (150,000 sq ft) research, development, and manufacturing center for LauncherOne at Long Beach Airport, California. The company reported in March 2015, that they were on schedule to begin test flights of LauncherOne with its NewtonThree engine by the end of 2016, but they did not achieve that objective.

On 25 June 2015, the company signed a contract with OneWeb Ltd. for 39 satellite launches for its satellite constellation with an option for an additional 100 launches, but in 2018 OneWeb canceled all but four, prompting a lawsuit from Virgin Orbit. OneWeb filed for bankruptcy protection in 2020.

News reports in September 2015 indicated that the heavier payload of 200 kg (440 lb) was to be achieved by longer fuel tanks and use of the recently qualified NewtonThree engine, but this also meant that the Virgin-developed carrier aircraft White Knight Two would no longer be able to lift the rocket to launch altitude, so in December 2015, Virgin announced a change to the carrier plane for LauncherOne to carry the heavier payload. The carrier aircraft subsequently was changed to a used Boeing 747-400, Cosmic Girl, previously operated by Virgin Galactic's sister company, Virgin Atlantic, and purchased outright by Virgin Group from Boeing upon the expiration of that airframe's lease. The 747 will allow a larger LauncherOne to carry the heavier payloads. The modification work on the company's 747 was expected to be completed in 2016, to be followed by orbital test launches of the rocket in 2017.

It was further announced in December 2015 that the revised LauncherOne would utilize the larger NewtonThree rocket engine on the booster stage, with the NewtonFour powering the second stage. NewtonThree was to be a 260–335 kN (58,000–75,000 lb_{f})-thrust engine, and began hot-fire testing by March 2015. The NewtonFour engine would power the second stage. NewtonThree generate 326.8 kN (73,500 lb_{f}) of thrust while NewtonFour deliver 26.5 kN (6,000 lb_{f}) to the second stage and is capable of multiple restarts.

On 2 March 2017, Virgin Galactic announced that its 200-member LauncherOne team was being spun off into a new company called Virgin Orbit. A subsidiary company of Virgin Orbit called Vox Space was created to carry out business which require strict security requirements. As of 2017, the company planned to fly approximately twice a month by 2020.

In September 2017, the first test flights of LauncherOne were delayed to 2018. By June 2018, the Virgin Orbit captive carry flight testing campaign for LauncherOne, including a planned drop test of an unfueled rocket, was licensed to begin in July 2018, and could run for up to six months.

In the event, no LauncherOne test flights occurred in 2018 and were delayed further, to December 2019, with only the carrier aircraft beginning to fly in 2018. The first three test flights of Cosmic Girl, including the pylon but not the rocket, happened on 23, 25 and 27 August 2018. A high-speed taxi test, with a rocket mounted beneath the aircraft, took place in early November 2018. The aircraft flew its first test flight with both pylon and rocket attached on 18 November 2018.

Virgin Orbit announced many upgrade and expansion plans that were not finished, such as a 3 stages variant. On 17 March 2022 Polish Space Agency and Virgin Orbit signed an agreement to use LauncherOne as means to send satellites into orbit, with its first launch from Poland planned for 2023.

Its parent, Virgin Orbit, declared Chapter 11 bankruptcy on April 4, 2023.

=== Flights ===
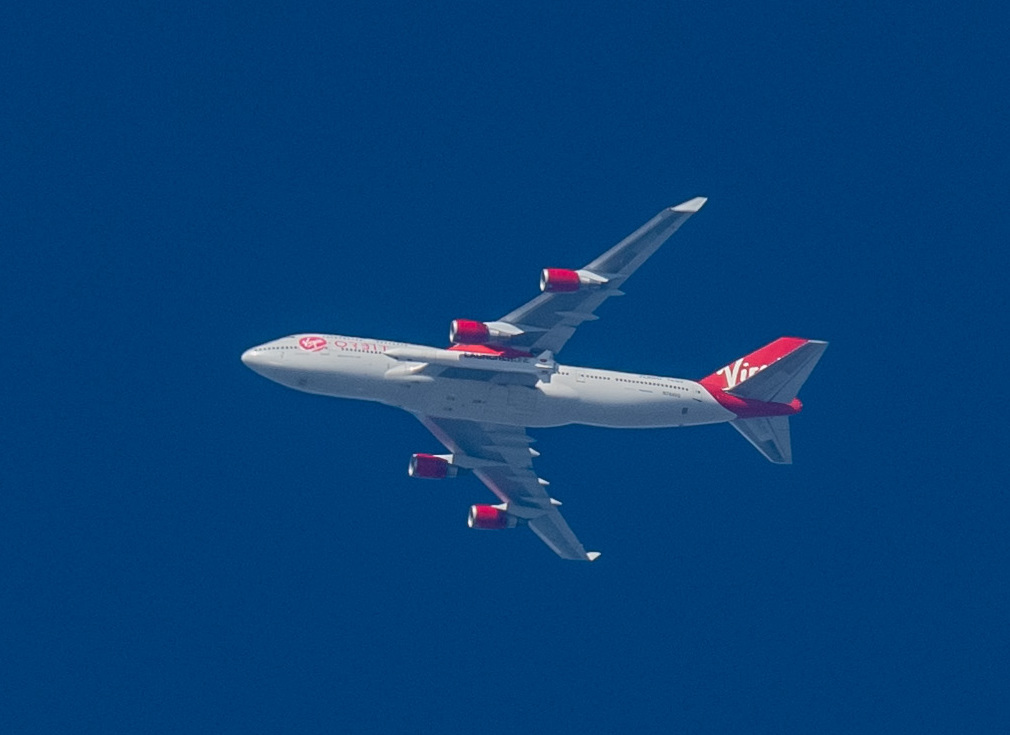
Cosmic Girl carrying LauncherOne during the first successful flight in January 2021.

The maiden flight of LauncherOne took place on 25 May 2020. The flight failed a few seconds after the ignition of the rocket due to a premature shutdown of the first stage engine, caused by a break in a propellant feed line, and the rocket did not reach space. The launch failure was attributed to a failure of a high-pressure liquid oxygen fuel line in the NewtonThree engine. Due to the failure, oxygen was no longer supplied to the engine and the flight was terminated. The issue with the fuel line was addressed by strengthening the broken components.

The second launch took place on 17 January 2021, and was the first to successfully reach orbit. The rocket deployed 10 CubeSats for NASA's Educational Launch of Nanosatellites mission (ELaNa 20). Cosmic Girl took off from Mojave Air and Space Port in California at 18:38 UTC. The aircraft launched the LauncherOne rocket at 19:39 UTC. The launch occurred at the altitude of 10,700 m (35,100 ft). On 17 January 2021, both NewtonThree and NewtonFour performed as expected. During launch, NewtonFour fired twice; once to inject the second stage and the payloads into a transfer orbit, and again to circularize the orbit.

On 9 January 2023, the first UK launch and final launch for the rocket took place, but it was unsuccessful. A filter within the second stage fuel feedline dislodged resulting in fuel pump inefficiency and lower flow of fuel to the NetwonFour engine. The reduced fuel flow caused the engine to operate at temperatures higher than expected resulting in damage to nearby components and subsequent early shutdown. Vehicle did not have enough velocity to make orbit.

== Design ==
LauncherOne is a two-stage air-launched vehicle. The rocket had a diameter of 1.6 m (5 ft 3 in) for the first stage and 1.3 m (4 ft 3 in) for the second stage and payload fairing.

On the 24th of October 2019, the company announced plans to develop a three-stage variant that would be capable of launching 100 kg (220 lb) to the Moon, 70 kg (150 lb) to Venus, or 50 kg (110 lb) to Mars.

=== Engines ===
LauncherOne is a two-stage air-launched vehicle using Newton engines, RP-1/LOX liquid rocket engines. The second stage was to be powered by NewtonOne, a 211 kN (47,000 lb_{f}) thrust engine. It was originally intended that the first stage will be powered by a scaled-up design of the same basic technology as NewtonOne, called NewtonTwo, with 211.5 kN (47,500 lb_{f}) of thrust. Both engines had been designed, and as of January 2014 first articles were built. NewtonOne was tested up to a full-duration burn of five minutes. NewtonTwo made several short-duration firings by early 2014.

NewtonThree is a 260–335 kN (58,000–75,000 lb_{f})-thrust engine, and began hot-fire tests as of March 2015. NewtonThree powered the first stage of LauncherOne.

=== 2015 redesign: new engines, larger payloads, new carrier aircraft ===
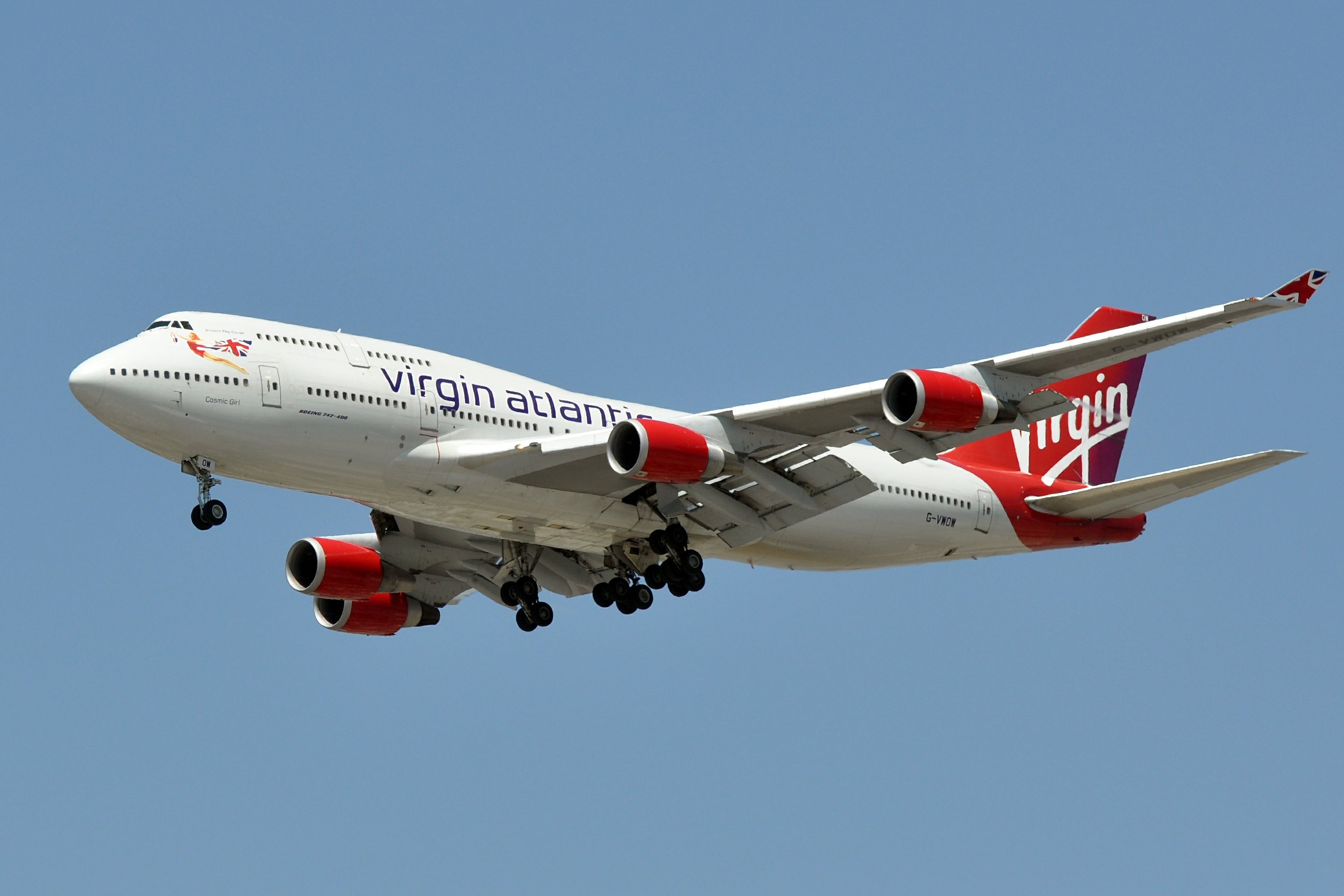
LauncherOne will be launched from this former Virgin Atlantic Boeing 747, named Cosmic Girl.

News reports in September 2015 indicated that the higher payload is to be achieved by longer fuel tanks and the NewtonThree engine but this will mean that White Knight Two would no longer be able to lift it to launch altitude. The rocket was to be carried to launch altitude by a Boeing 747. The revised LauncherOne utilizes both the Newton 3 and Newton 4 rocket engines.

In December 2015, Virgin announced a change to the carrier plane for LauncherOne, as well as a substantially-larger design point for the rocket itself. The carrier aircraft will now be a Boeing 747, which will in turn allow a larger LauncherOne to carry heavier payloads than previously planned. The modification work on the particular Boeing 747 that Virgin has purchased is expected to be completed in 2016, to be followed by Orbital test launches of the rocket in 2017.

== Intended usage ==
LauncherOne is designed to launch a 300 kg (660 lb) payload to a 500 km (310 mi) Sun-synchronous orbit (SSO), suitable for CubeSats and small payloads. Virgin Orbit has also announced the ability of LauncherOne to send payloads into heliocentric orbit for flybys of Mars, Venus or asteroids.

== Launch sites ==
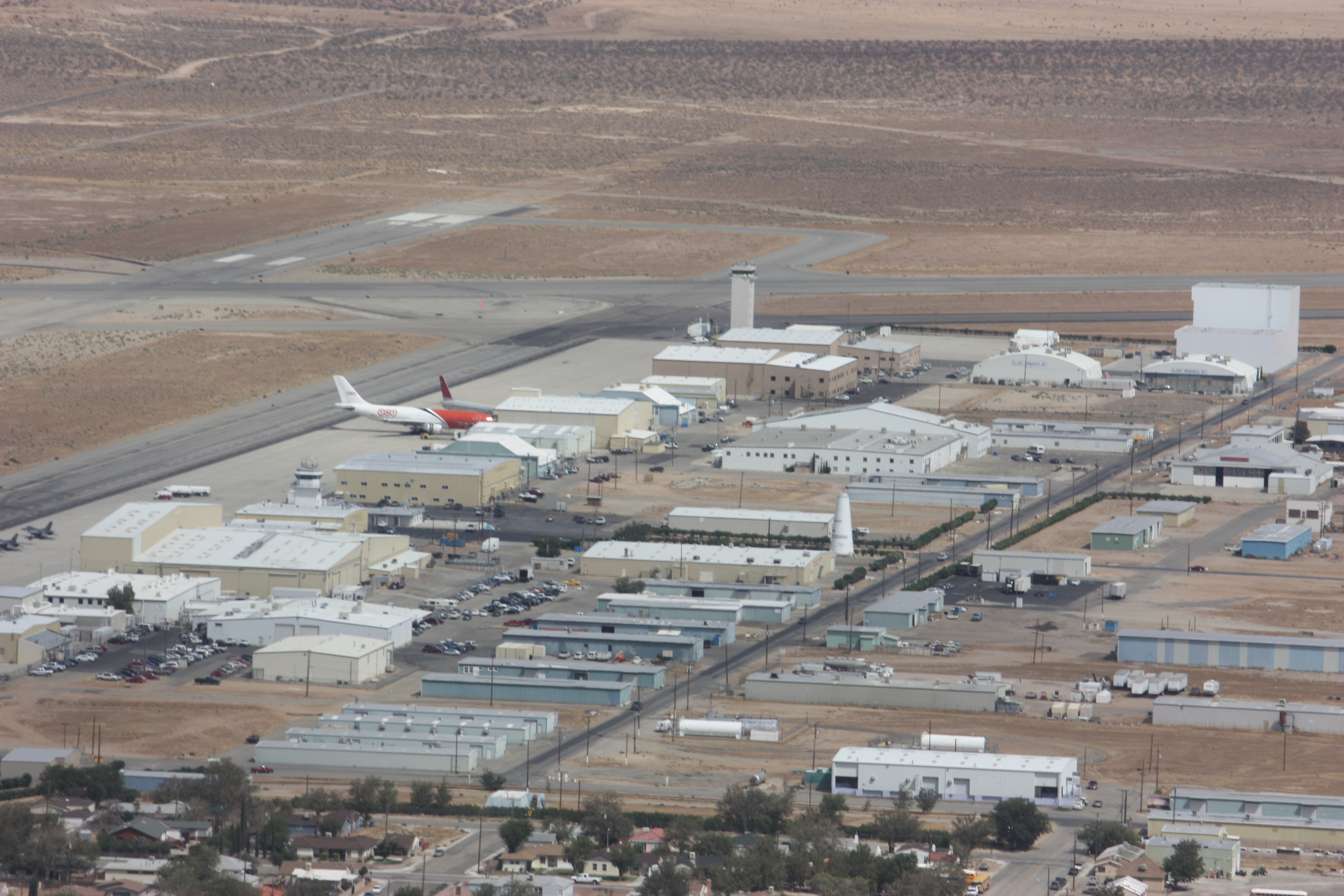
Mojave Air and Space Port

Virgin Orbit integrated payloads at their headquarters in Long Beach, California.

LauncherOne launched from the Cosmic Girl Boeing 747-400 carrier, attached to a pylon on the aircraft's left wing, and released over the ocean at a location depending on the desired orbital inclination. This process avoids typical delays for ground launches due to weather and upper-level winds. William Pomerantz of Virgin Orbit stated that any airport that can support a Boeing 747 could have been used, subject to local legislation.

The carrier plane lifted off from the Mojave Air and Space Port in California, United States and Newquay Airport in Cornwall, United Kingdom. The company also had plans to use other airports such as Kennedy Space Center in Florida and Alcântara Space Center in Brazil that never materialized. Other proposed launch sites included Ellison Onizuka Kona International Airport in Hawaii, José Aponte de la Torre Airport in Puerto Rico, Oita Airport in Japan, Andersen Air Force Base in Guam and Toowoomba Wellcamp Airport in Australia.

== Past launches ==
Flight no.	Date and time (UTC)	Launch site	Payload	Orbit	Customer	Outcome
1	25 May 2020; 19:50	Mojave Air and Space Port	Launch Demo with "inert test payload" (Starshine 4) and INTERNSAT (intended to remain attached to the upper stage).	Low Earth	Virgin Orbit	Failure
1	25 May 2020; 19:50	Flight test, maiden orbital flight. Launch failure after successful release and ignition of the NewtonThree engines on the first stage. A high-pressure propellant line broke causing liquid oxygen to stop flowing into the engine. Issue was addressed through strengthening engine components that broke. Prior to failure aerodynamics including fins acted as expected.				
2	17 January 2021; 19:38:51	Mojave Air and Space Port	ELaNa 20 payloads: CACTUS-1, CAPE-3, EXOCUBE-2, MiTEE, PICS 1, PICS 2, PolarCube, Q-PACE, RadFXSat-2, TechEdSat-7.	Low Earth	NASA	Success
2	17 January 2021; 19:38:51	Dedicated launch of 10 NASA sponsored CubeSats. First successful launch of LauncherOne and the first fully liquid-fueled air-launched rocket to reach orbit.				
3	30 June 2021; 14:47	Mojave Air and Space Port	STP-27VPA, BRIK-II, STORK-4, STORK-5 (MARTA)	Low Earth	MDA, USA SMDC, U.S. Navy, RNLAF, SatRevolution	Success
3	30 June 2021; 14:47	Tubular Bells, Part One mission. STP-27VPA is composed of four military CubeSats: Gunsmoke-J 3, HALO-Net Free Flyer, and two CNCE Blk 1 satellites.				
4	13 January 2022; 22:51:39	Mojave Air and Space Port	STP-27VPB (PAN-A and B, GEARRS-3, TechEdSat-13), SteamSat-2, STORK-3, ADLER-1 (Lemur-2 Krywe).	Low Earth	Department of Defense, NASA, SteamJet Space Systems, SatRevolution, Austrian Space Forum	Success
4	13 January 2022; 22:51:39	Above the Clouds mission. STP-27VPB mission for the Defense Innovation Unit is composed of four CubeSats: PAN-A/B (ELaNa 29 mission), GEARRS-3, and TechEdSat-13.				
5	2 July 2022; 06:53	Mojave Air and Space Port	CTIM-FD, GPX-2, Gunsmoke-L (Lonestar) × 2, MISR-B, NACHOS-2, Recurve, Slingshot-1	Low Earth	U.S. Space Force, DND, CU Boulder, Langley Research Center	Success
5	2 July 2022; 06:53	Straight Up mission. STP-S28A mission for the U.S. Space Force, consisting of 7 satellites. The ELaNa 39 mission, consisting of two CubeSats, was launched on this flight. Virgin Orbit's first nighttime launch.				
6	9 January 2023; 23:08:49	Spaceport Cornwall	AMAN, CIRCE A & B, DOVER, ForgeStar-0, IOD-3 Amber, Prometheus 2A & 2B, STORK-6	Low Earth	ETCO, Dstl / NRL, RHEA Group, Space Forge, Satellite Applications Catapult, UK Ministry of Defence / NRO, SatRevolution	Failure
6	9 January 2023; 23:08:49	Start Me Up mission. First LauncherOne flight from Spaceport Cornwall. The rocket suffered an issue during second stage burn and did not reach orbit.				

== Not materialized launches ==
Flight no.	Date and time (UTC)	Launch site	Payload	Orbit	Customer	Note
7	2023	Mojave Air and Space Port	QPS-SAR-5	Low Earth	iQPS	Launched on Rocket Lab Electron
7	2023	Moved to Rocket Lab's Electron rocket.				
	2023	Mojave Air and Space Port	Athena & STP-S28C payloads	Low Earth	U.S. Air Force, NovaWurks	
	2023	STP-S28C mission.				
	2023	Mojave Air and Space Port		Low Earth	U.S. Air Force, CU Boulder, The Aerospace Corporation	
	2023	STP-S28B mission. The ELaNa-46 mission, consisting of three CubeSats, will launch on this flight.				
	2023	Mojave Air and Space Port	HYPERSAT 1	Low Earth	HyperSat	
	2023	First of six launches contracted to Virgin Orbit for HyperSat's hyperspectral satellite constellation.				
	2023	Mojave Air and Space Port	NorthStar × 3	Low Earth	NorthStar	
	2023	Mojave Air and Space Port	Lemur-2 × ?	Low Earth	Spire Global	
	2023	First of multiple launches contracted to Virgin Orbit for Spire Global.				
		Mojave Air and Space Port	SatRevolution Mars mission	Areocentric	SatRevolution	
Commercial smallsat mission to Mars, using the Exploration 3-Stage Variant of LauncherOne.

== Launch statistics ==
=== Launch outcomes ===
- Failure
- Success

=== Launch sites ===
- Mojave
- Cornwall

== See also ==
- NOTS-EV-1 Pilot
- Pegasus (rocket)
- StratoLaunch
