= Virgin Orbit =

Defunct American aerospace company

- Type: Public
- Traded as: OTCID Basic: VORBQ
- Industry: Aerospace
- Predecessor: Virgin Galactic
- Founded: March 2, 2017; 9 years ago
- Defunct: May 22, 2023; 3 years ago
- Fate: Chapter 11 bankruptcy
- Headquarters: Long Beach, California, United States
- Key people: Dan Hart (President and CEO); Brita O'rear (CFO)
- Products: LauncherOne
- Services: Orbital rocket launch
- Total equity: ▼US$47m (2023); US$4b (2021)
- Owners: Virgin Group; Mubadala
- Number of employees: 100 (2023)
- Website: virginorbit.com

Virgin Orbit was a company within the Virgin Group that provided launch services for small satellites. The company was formed in 2017 as a spin-off of Richard Branson's Virgin Galactic space tourism venture to develop and market the LauncherOne rocket, which had previously been a project under Virgin Galactic. LauncherOne was a two-stage launch vehicle, air-launched from a Boeing 747 carrier aircraft, designed to deliver 300 kg of payload to low Earth orbit.

On December 30, 2021, Virgin Orbit underwent a SPAC merger with NextGen Acquisition Corp, and became a publicly traded company (symbol VORB) at the Nasdaq stock exchange. Upon listing Virgin Orbit was valued at $3.7 billion.

LauncherOne made six flights from 2020 to 2023, resulting in four successes and two failures. After the second failure in January 2023 and amid an inability to secure additional financing, the company laid off staff and suspended operations in March 2023, finalizing Chapter 11 bankruptcy auction on May 22, 2023. Remaining assets were divested for $36 million, less than 1% of the company's valuation upon IPO.

== Vehicles ==
=== LauncherOne ===
On May 25, 2020, LauncherOne's first launch failed to reach orbit.

On January 17, 2021, LauncherOne became the first Virgin Orbit vehicle to reach orbit, successfully deploying 10 CubeSats into Low Earth Orbit for NASA on its final demonstration mission. LauncherOne was deployed from the left (port) wing of a retrofitted Boeing 747, 33,000 feet (10 kilometers) above the Pacific Ocean. The rocket was dedicated to the memory of the mother of Richard Branson, founder of Virgin - Eve Branson, who died from COVID-19 on January 8, 2021.

On June 30, 2021, LauncherOne successfully delivered its first commercial payload to space.

On January 13, 2022, LauncherOne successfully delivered seven cubesats for three customers into orbit.

On July 2, 2022, LauncherOne flew a successful mission.

On January 9, 2023, LauncherOne failed to orbit despite a nominal drop from the aircraft, with Virgin Orbit citing "an anomaly" with the upper stage. The failed payload included nine satellites from seven different customers. This was Virgin Orbit's first attempted launch from the UK at Spaceport Cornwall; previous launches were from Mojave Air and Space Port.

=== Cosmic Girl ===
Cosmic Girl was the name of the modified Boeing 747-400 that Virgin Orbit used to launch its rockets. In 2022, Virgin Orbit announced plans to acquire additional 747s with the ability to transport the rocket and ground support equipment internally.

== Operations and financials ==
Based in Long Beach, California, at its founding in 2017, Virgin Orbit had more than 300 employees led by president Dan Hart, a former vice president of government satellite systems at Boeing. The company from which it was spun off, Virgin Galactic, continued to focus on two other capabilities: human suborbital spaceflight operations and advanced aerospace design, manufacturing, and testing.

In October 2019, Virgin Orbit announced that Matthew Stannard was joining as a pilot on a three-year contract. Stannard had previously served in the Royal Air Force as a test and evaluation pilot notably on Typhoon jets. At that time Orbit was about to start testing its Cosmic Girl launch platform.

A few months prior to going public, Virgin Orbit was owned by Richard Branson's Virgin Group and the Emirati state-owned Mubadala, which had invested about $1 billion in Virgin Orbit through August 2021.

In August 2021 when the SPAC merger was announced, Virgin Orbit estimated it needed $420 million in cash, starting in the second half of 2021, to reach positive cash flow in 2024. When it went public in December 2021, after completing its SPAC merger, the company raised $228 million, less than half than the $483 million it expected to raise. Virgin Orbit held an "opening bell" ceremony at Nasdaq on January 7, 2022, to celebrate going public; it opened at $10 per share.

When the SPAC merger was announced in August 2021, Virgin Orbit aimed to be profitable on an EBITDA-basis by end of Q4 2024. The company said it had about $300 million in active contracts, and expected its rocket launch business to grow to about 18 launches in 2023. The company expected to have about $15 million in revenue in 2021, with an EBITDA loss of $156 million; however, it aimed at further revenue growth, reaching $2.1 billion in revenue by 2026.

The company's third-quarter financial report, issued in November 2022, showed cash on hand of $71.2 million, $30.9 million in revenue, and an adjusted EBITDA loss of $42.9 million for the period. The company's backlog of binding contracts fell by 12%, to $143 million, compared to the end of the prior quarter, and forecast that it would only have three launches in 2022, compared to a forecast of four to six, made earlier in 2022.

=== Bankruptcy, quest for liquidity, and dissolution, Matthew Brown involvement ===
On March 16, 2023, Virgin Orbit announced a pause in operations and furloughing of nearly its entire staff, while seeking additional funding. Causes for the event are cited as both capital management issues and technical challenges. Virgin Orbit recorded a loss of US$139.5 million for the first nine months of 2022.

Matthew Brown Companies, a Hawaii- and Texas-based venture capital firm led by Hawaii-based entrepreneur Matthew Brown submitted a private $200 million tender offer for Virgin Orbit in March 2023, which did not proceed after preliminary discussions leaked publicly. The proposed deal, a term sheet provided by Virgin Orbit, was labeled “non-binding” and “for discussion purposes only.” It also stated that it did not “constitute an offer.”

On August 19, 2025, the U.S. District Court for the Northern District of Texas granted the Securities and Exchange Commission's motion for partial summary judgment on civil liability for certain misstatements, but made no findings of investor fraud, financial harm, securities trading by Brown, or profit realized by him. Brown has faced no criminal charges or convictions, and the Court confirmed no evidence that any investor was deceived or suffered financial loss. Neither Brown nor his company traded in Virgin Orbit stock. Brown instead testified he had access to funds through venture capitalist growth funding he arranged and his inherited $250 million oil and gas trust, of which Matthew Brown Companies is the trustee. He also testified Virgin Orbit denied his due diligence requests despite satisfying theirs. Brown has also joined civil actions against Virgin Orbit in U.S. bankruptcy court, asserting claims of fraudulent inducement and fraudulent misrepresentation. Brown obtained and collected an $8 million civil judgment in related litigation involving Virgin Orbit and associated parties. Separate proceedings regarding remedies in the SEC enforcement action remain ongoing, where the SEC has argued that Brown has the financial ability to pay a Tier III civil penalty based on an asserted net worth exceeding $250 million. Brown disputes the SEC’s characterization of his financial condition, raised estoppel-related arguments. On September 27, 2026, the court entered a final civil judgment ordering Brown to pay a $236,451 penalty. It also barred him from serving as an officer or director of public reporting companies and from participating in securities transactions, except purchases and sales for his own personal account. Brown has said he plans to appeal.

Board members had approved golden parachute plans for executives in the weeks before filing for bankruptcy. The company declared Chapter 11 bankruptcy on April 4, 2023.

After news of the bankruptcy, Dan Hart mentioned that Virgin Orbit had received over 30 indications of interest in the company after Virgin Orbit's inability to secure liquidity. Regarding Brown, Hart testified: "To my knowledge, the investment proposal was one of the final options under consideration for funding ... this was a difficult outcome during a challenging period."

Assets were divested to three major bidders in May 2023: Rocket Lab acquired the company's Long Beach facility, manufacturing and tooling assets for $16 million, Launcher purchased the company's Mojave test site for $3 million, and the Cosmic Girl aircraft was sold to Stratolaunch Systems for $17 million. An additional $3.8 million in assets were sold to Firefly Aerospace on June 15. Virgin Orbit intellectual property is for sale.

== VOX Space ==
VOX Space was a subsidiary of Virgin Orbit that was created in 2020. The company supplied launch services for the US military, sometimes referred to as the "national security launch market". The company used the Virgin Orbit LauncherOne launch vehicle. The president as of July 2022 was Mark Baird, who took over on August 17, 2021.

In April 2020, VOX Space was awarded a US$35 million contract for three launches of 44 cubesats for US Space Force. The first of these launches succeeded on July 2, 2022.

== Other projects ==
=== Ventilators ===
In response to the COVID-19 pandemic in early 2020, Virgin Orbit announced it was a partner with the University of California Irvine and the University of Texas at Austin in a new venture to build simplified mechanical ventilators — specifically "bridge ventilators" for partially recovered patients and patients not in intensive care — to address the critical global shortage of ventilators. They were granted an emergency use authorization by the US Food and Drug Administration (FDA) in April 2020.

=== Launch site in the UK ===
Virgin Orbit agreed to launch space flights from Spaceport Cornwall in a project partly funded by the UK Space Agency.

Virgin Orbit's first and only UK launch took place on January 9, 2023. The rocket failed to reach orbit.

=== Launch site in Brazil ===
In April 2021, the Brazilian Space Agency disclosed the company among those selected to operate orbital launches from the Alcantara Launch Center in Brazil. On June 27, 2022, Virgin Orbit announced a Brazil-based subsidiary, Virgin Orbit Brasil Ltda, to facilitate launches from the Alcantara Launch Center. The Brazil-based launch center is just two degrees south of the Equator, allowing launches to almost every orbital inclination. In the end, no launches from Brazil took place.

=== Launch site in Australia ===
In September 2022, Virgin Orbit signed an agreement with Wagners to base a 747-400 launch aircraft at Toowoomba Wellcamp Airport in Queensland with a demonstrator launch planned for 2024. In the end, no launches from Australia were performed.

=== Mission to Mars ===
Virgin Orbit considered a mission to Mars in 2022. In the end, Virgin Orbit did not perform any interplanetary missions; especially the Mars mission did not happen.
