= Satellite refuelling =

Operation of replenishing

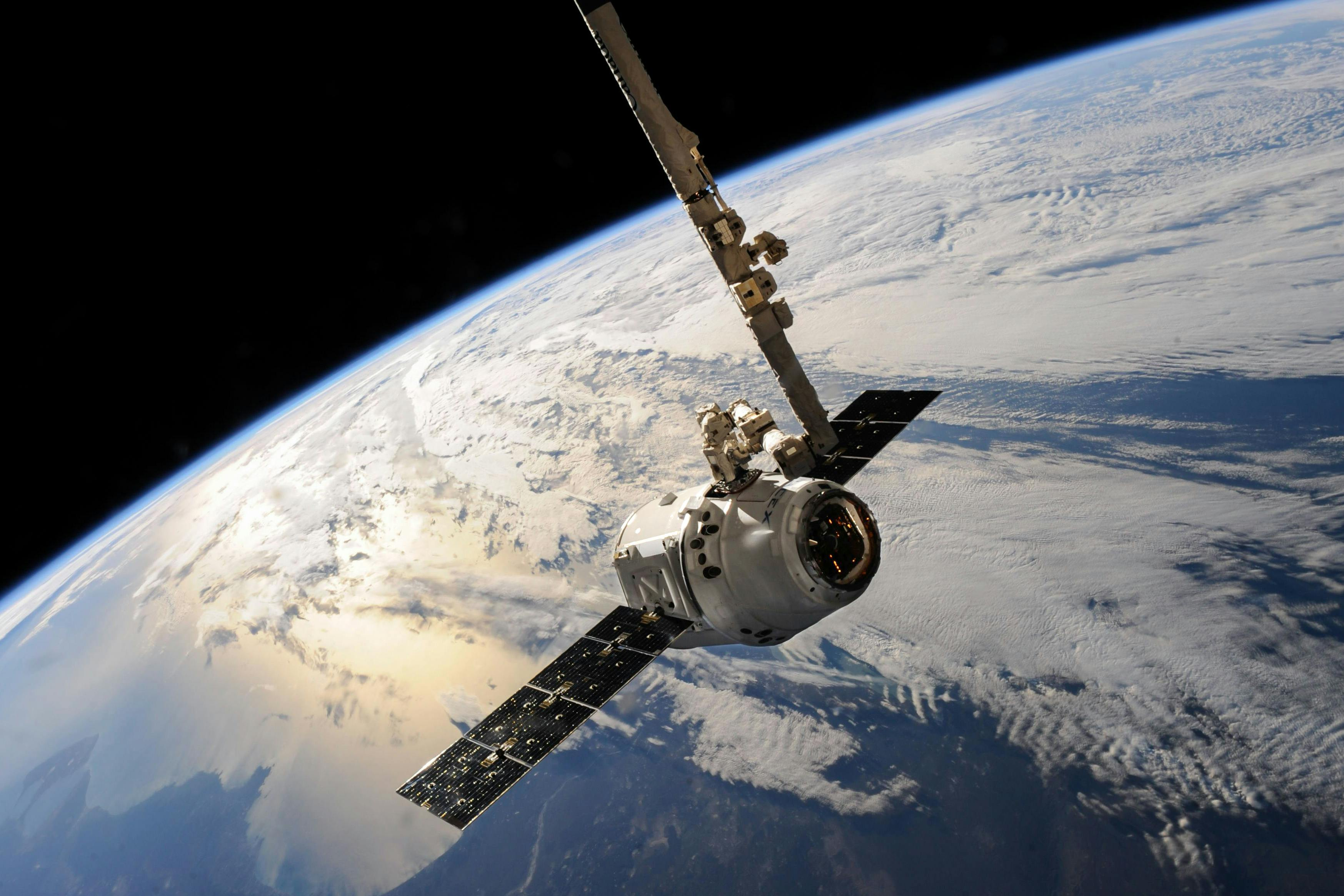
SpaceX Dragon orbiting Earth over Argentina

Satellite refuelling is the operation of replenishing on board propellants and other consumables in satellites in orbit, e.g. in geostationary orbit around Earth.

This could be for storable propellants, and later for cryogenic propellants.

Northrop Grumman’s Mission Extension Vehicle (MEV) was previously used to service and extend the lifespan of a satellite in orbit. In addition, NASA’s OSAM-1 project aimed to refuel satellites using a robotic arm but was ultimately cancelled due to budgetary reasons. Current designs aim to implement remote-controlled robotics for servicing and refuelling, such as NASA’s RRM. Tasks include cutting through fuel valves, removing caps, and connecting special hoses for fluid transfer.

Synchronizing movements between satellite and counterpart spacecraft is significant to prevent collisions. Newton’s Third Law has to be addressed in space with counterbalancing through venting or thrusting, especially with cryogenic fuel. Temperature needs to be managed as satellites’ temperatures may vary significantly from heat loss to deep space and heat absorption from the sun. There are over 45,000 man-made trackable objects orbiting Earth, posing an overcrowding issue that will only increase in the near future. Legal issues include questions about liability of servicing missions. Financial issues include uncertain demand and high cost of technical challenges.

As of April 16, 2026, future work may involve refuelling demonstrations to facilitate enhanced understanding of the technological capabilities and feasibility/scalability. Alternative options such as deorbiting and the usage of MEVs may be compared against refuelling to determine which option is best in the long term.

Technological advancements, such as robotic octopus arms and satellite refuelling depots, may make refuelling procedures easier, though wide-scale adoption (and testing) of these technologies is yet to be seen.

== History ==
The Mission Extension Vehicle (MEV) was used on February 25, 2020 to extend the life of satellites in orbit. This was done, not by strictly refuelling the satellite by providing it with more liquid fuel, but by becoming the satellite’s engine. The MEV attaches itself to the satellite in need and serves as its new engine by pulling the satellite to where it needs to go. The MEV-1 has undocked from its first satellite on April 9, 2025 and is now set to service its next satellite.

The OSAM-1, previously known as the Restore-L, was a project from NASA designed to refuel the Landsat-7 satellite. This would be done through a robotic arm known as the SPIDER, allowing for the servicing of satellites that were not initially meant for servicing. However, despite over $2 billion in funding, the mission was cancelled in 2024.

NASA’s Robotic Refueling Mission (RRM) aims to implement remote-controlled robotic technology for satellite refuelling. RRM Phase 1 was successful in refuelling the International Space Station (ISS) in 2013; it transferred ethanol into the ISS by using a wire cutter tool to cut through multilayered fuel valves and remove caps, which are used frequently in orbiting satellites. Ethanol was used instead of satellite fuel due to its dangerous and corrosive properties.

RRM-2 focuses on the process leading up to replacing coolant in satellites, including the removal of caps, valves, and the implementation of the VIPIR inspection tool, which captures data through its miniaturized camera in space.

RRM-3, launched in 2018, expanded on phases 1 and 2 by adding the ability of prolonged storage and transfer of cryogenic fluids, including liquid hydrogen and liquid methane, to sustain the propulsion and cooling of satellites. RRM-3 is designed to use a Dextre robotic arm to prepare and move the fluids from a source tank to a receiver tank.

== Challenges ==
A significant challenge in satellite refuelling is synchronizing movements with both the satellite and its counterpart spacecraft. This is necessary to prevent collisions with the spacecraft. Another is addressing how to account for Newton’s Third Law in zero gravity, as any maneuver of mechanisms or fluids will maneuver the spacecraft as well. This is significant for cryogenic fuel as the fluid transfer causes a force that has to be counterbalanced with venting or thrusting.

Another challenge is temperature. Satellites lose heat to deep space and absorb heat from the sun due to the second law of thermodynamics. Temperature variance used to be addressed through “rotisserie mode” as satellites would spin and balance their temperature; however, modern satellites often do not have such capabilities due to cost concerns. As a result, fuel can freeze or overheat, which would put a refuelling mission at risk.

Overcrowding in space is an additional issue as each satellite needs space to orbit and maneuver. As there are over 45,000 man-made trackable objects orbiting Earth, satellites and potential refuelling spacecraft are at risk of possible collisions. This risk may increase with the launch of more satellites. Space X, for example, is seeking permission from the FCC to launch 1 million satellites to establish orbital data centers as of January 31, 2026.

Legal issues include provisions of Article 7 of the 1972 Outer Space Treaty which provides that the launching state is liable for damage caused by spacecraft, even if it is sold to another state. Ergo, this poses significant questions for servicing missions as they may cause significant liability for involved parties if unsuccessful.

Financial obstacles relate to uncertain demand and high costs required to address technical challenges. For instance, NASA shut down its $2 billion satellite refuelling program in 2024 due to continued technical and scheduling challenges coupled with the inability to find an industry partner. Additionally, high costs of servicing satellites has created the demand for providers. These are companies which service satellites for other companies and may be paid through a small percentage of the total mission value.

== Alternatives ==
Rather than refuel, another craft could attach itself to the customer satellite and provide any desired propulsion - such a task can be facilitated by Northrop Grumman's Mission Extension Vehicle, which debuted in 2021.

Another alternative pathway would be deorbiting (removing the satellite from orbit), which may be more cost effective than refuelling.

== Future plans ==
The US Space Force has no official position on feasibility of the technology; however, there are upcoming refuelling demonstrations that may illustrate the technological requirements and financial viability of refuelling.

Improvements on NASA's RRMs such as robotic octopus arms are designed to ease refuelling procedures, but testing is in its nascent stages. There are also initial plans for propellant depots - stationary hubs that can act as gas stations for satellites in orbit.

== Examples ==
- Space Infrastructure Servicing by Canadian MDA
- Orbital Express — a 2007 U.S. government-sponsored mission to test in-space satellite servicing with two vehicles designed from the start for on-orbit refuelling and subsystem replacement.
- Robotic Refueling Mission, a series of NASA projects, including cryogenics transfer tests at ISS

== Standards ==
- In-Orbit Refueling Working Group (IOR-WG)
- Consortium for Execution of Rendezvous and Servicing Operations (CONFERS)
- Rapidly Attachable Fluid Transfer Interface, for non-cryogenic fluids and gases
- ASSIST, for docking, ground tested by a consortium of European companies.
