= On-orbit satellite servicing =

Refueling, repairing, or boosting the orbit of satellites

On-orbit satellite servicing (OOS) refers to refueling, boosting, or repairing space satellites while in orbit.

New commercial interest in on-orbit servicing of satellites is in large part due to the decreased costs of launching commercial satellites and the rise of low orbit, rather than geostationary, satellites for which servicing costs less.

== History ==
Although servicing of satellites has been theoretically considered since the early days of spaceflight, little was done.

The term is usually thought of as meaning autonomous or telerobotic servicing of a satellite by robotic spacecraft, but can also mean servicing that occurs by human astronauts, such as repeated and regular servicing of the International Space Station (ISS) starting in 1998.

The first orbital repair was made by James van Hoften and George Nelson in 1984 during their mission to Solar Maximum Mission (SMM) satellite.

One famous sequence of servicing a satellite by astronauts was the several flights of the Space Shuttle to the Hubble Space Telescope (HST) in 1993–2009 for manual (human-assisted) subsystem-replacement to repair or extend the life of the HST. The five Hubble Space Telescope servicing missions were STS-61 in 1993, STS-82 in 1997, STS-103 in 1999, STS-109 in 2002, and STS-125 in 2009.

Orbital Express was a space mission managed by the United States Defense Advanced Research Projects Agency (DARPA) and a team led by engineers at NASA's Marshall Space Flight Center (MSFC). The Orbital Express program was aimed at developing "a safe and cost-effective approach to autonomously service satellites in orbit". The system consisted of two spacecraft: the ASTRO servicing satellite, and a prototype modular next-generation serviceable satellite; NEXTSat. The mission launched from Cape Canaveral Air Force Station on 8 March 2007, aboard an Atlas V expendable launch vehicle. The launch was part of the United States Space Force Space Test Program STP-1 mission.

A collaboration was initiated in 2012 by the Defense Advanced Research Projects Agency — called DARPA Phoenix — with the aim to recycle retired satellite parts into new on-orbit satellite assets, principally focused on satellites in the geosynchronous Clarke Belt. The project was initiated in July 2012 with plans for system launches no earlier than 2016. At the time, small satellite tests in low Earth orbit were projected to occur as early as 2015. A number of system elements were designed and tested, the U.S. government-funded development program was continued after 2015 as the Robotic Servicing of Geosynchronous Satellites (RSGS) Program which launched atop a Space Logistics (Northrop Grumman subsidiary) Mission Robotics Vehicle (MRV-1) on July 21, 2026.

Another collaboration was initiated in 2017 by DARPA between certain researchers and U.S. government contractors to develop rules for the future commercial use of in-orbit satellite repair. Although commercial launches to space are regulated by government agencies, satellite servicing protocols have not yet been developed.

In 2016, INTESLAT contracted for Orbital-ATK/Northrop Grumman company to use the MEV-1 to service the Intelsat 901 satellite. The servicing mission was accomplished in 2019 allowing INTELSAT 901's operational lifetime to be extended by five years. Following the success of that mission, Northrop Grumman was contracted by the U.S. government to study the possibility of servicing U.S. national security satellites.

In 2022, Lockheed-Martin proposed the Mission Augmentation Port (MAP) interface standard for on-orbit satellite servicing and mission augmentation.

== See also ==
- ETS-VII
- DART (satellite)
- Mission Extension Vehicle
- Orbital Express
- Robotic Refueling Mission
- Satellite refuelling
- Space Infrastructure Servicing
- SPADEX
- Robotic Servicing of Geosynchronous Satellites program
- OSAM-1
