= Swift boost mission =

On-orbit satellite servicing mission

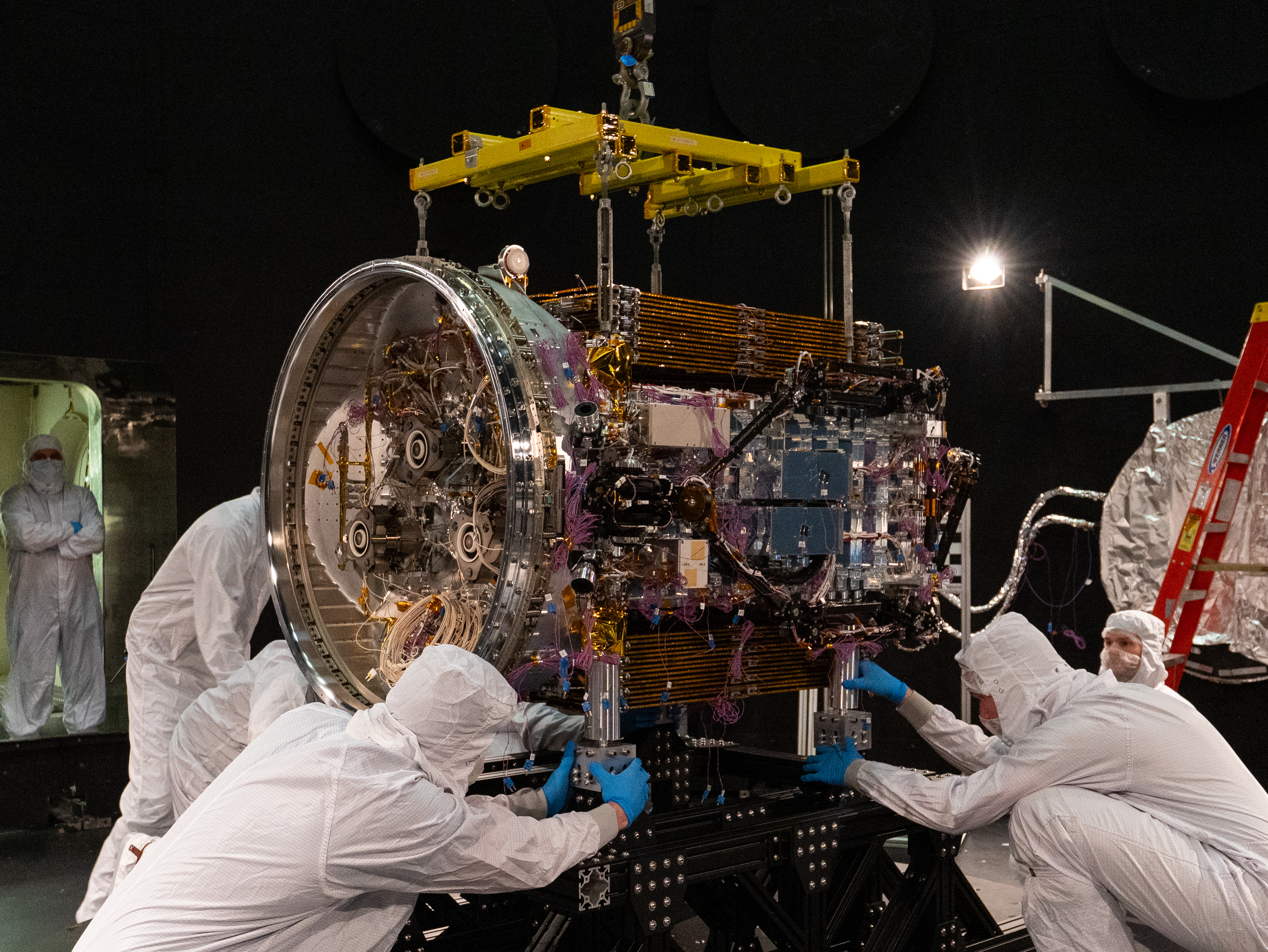
- LINK being prepared for thermal vacuum testing
- Mission type: On-orbit satellite servicing
- Operator: LINK: Katalyst Space Technologies; Swift: NASA/Pennsylvania State University
- COSPAR ID: 2026-152A
- SATCAT no.: 69792
- Website: science.nasa.gov/mission/swift/swift-boost-mission/
- Mission duration: 83 days, 19 hours, 27 minutes

Spacecraft properties
- Spacecraft: LINK
- Manufacturer: Katalyst Space Technologies
- Launch mass: 425 kg (937 lb)
- Dry mass: 365 kg (805 lb)
- Dimensions: Height: 1.5 m (4.9 ft); Deployed width: 12 m (39 ft)
- Power: 4.2 kW

Start of mission
- Launch date: July 3, 2026, 08:36 UTC
- Rocket: Pegasus XL
- Launch site: Kwajalein Atoll
- Contractor: Northrop Grumman

End of mission
- Disposal: Deorbited
- Decay date: September 25, 2026, 04:03 UTC

Orbital parameters
- Reference system: Geocentric orbit
- Regime: Low Earth orbit
- Perigee altitude: 362 km (225 mi) (initial)
- Apogee altitude: 392 km (244 mi) (initial)
- Inclination: 20.6°

Capture of Neil Gehrels Swift Observatory
- RMS capture: cancelled
- Katalyst mission patch, with Latin motto "Audentes fortuna iuvat" ("Fortune favors the bold")

The Swift boost mission was a robotic on-orbit satellite servicing mission that was intended to boost the orbit and extend the lifetime of the Neil Gehrels Swift Observatory and prevent it from undergoing uncontrolled reentry. The LINK servicing spacecraft, built and operated by Katalyst Space Technologies, was launched on July 3, 2026, and reentered on September 25, 2026.

LINK was to have been the first commercial spacecraft to dock with a government-owned spacecraft that was not designed for docking or on-orbit servicing. However, following ongoing attitude control problems, Katalyst abandoned the boost attempt, and simply conducted rendezvous and proximity tests around Swift while their spacecraft remained in orbit.

== Swift ==
Swift was a three-instrument gamma-ray observatory launched in 2004. It monitors gamma-ray bursts (GRBs), detecting about one hundred per year and providing data to other observatories. Swift cost $500 million to build, launch, and operate. It had a unique ability to quickly turn to observe GRBs before they fade, and with no planned replacement, its loss will significantly impede time-domain astrophysics.

Altitude of Swift Observatory

Swift occupied a low Earth orbit with an initial altitude of approximately 600 kilometers (370 mi), which had gradually decayed since launch due to atmospheric drag and Swift not having a propulsion system of its own to correct the decay. Increased solar activity around the 2024 solar maximum expanded the Earth's atmosphere and accelerated the decay. NASA officially terminated the operations for Swift on 23 October 2026 ahead of the spacecraft's uncontrolled reentry, which occurred twelve days later on 4 November.

== Contract award ==
In August 2025, NASA awarded two companies, Cambrian Works and Katalyst Space Technologies, $150,000 each under Phase III SBIR contracts for concept design studies for a Swift orbit boost mission. In September, NASA awarded Katalyst with a $30 million SBIR Phase III contract to develop and launch a spacecraft to dock with Swift and boost its orbit. Katalyst beat out proposals from Starfish Space and a joint venture of Cambrian Works and Astroscale. The contractors eligible for the award were limited to those with existing technology development contracts with NASA, owing to the months-long process of establishing a new procurement under federal acquisition rules. In the award announcement, NASA official Shawn Domagal-Goldman said "Given how quickly Swift's orbit is decaying, we are in a race against the clock" to save it.

The $30 million contract was a very modest sum for the development and launching of a spacecraft; by comparison, Swift cost $250 million to build and launch in 2004. A Northrop Grumman Pegasus launch cost $28 million in 2021, though Katalyst reportedly obtained launch services from Northrop at a discount; the Pegasus used to launch LINK was originally built for another customer.

Katalyst, founded in 2020 and based in Flagstaff, Arizona was already planning a mission in 2026 to demonstrate its on-orbit servicing capability. The company has not previously flown a spacecraft, but Atomos Space, which Katalyst acquired in April 2025, has. The company will use the Swift rescue mission to reduce the technical risk of its planned geostationary multi-mission servicing spacecraft, NEXUS, planned for 2027.

The selection of a private enterprise for the Swift rescue mission represents a policy shift for NASA with respect to servicing in low Earth orbit, following the 2024 cancellation of the in-house OSAM-1 (formerly Restore-L) mission due to cost overruns.

== Drag minimization ==
On February 11, 2026, most of Swift's science operations were suspended in favor of pointing the spacecraft and its solar arrays to minimize drag and extend the orbit lifetime. The effort to enable this operating mode required extensive software rewrites, including use of agentic AI. By disabling instruments to conserve power, and relaxing a requirement to have its solar arrays pointing within ten degrees of the Sun, Swift's operators were able to reduce its average cross-sectional area in the direction of flight to approximately thirty percent of nominal while remaining power positive. Below approximately 300 km (190 mi), drag-induced torques would make it impossible for Swift to maintain attitude control. As of mid-June, modeling predicted Swift would remain above this critical altitude into at least October, three to four months beyond what was predicted prior to drag minimization efforts, leaving sufficient time for LINK to attempt to rendezvous and dock.

On August 26th, following the failure of the boost mission, Swift resumed operating two of its science instruments, the Ultraviolet/Optical Telescope (UVOT) and X-ray Telescope (XRT), with plans to resume operating the Burst Alert Telescope (BAT) instrument, which ceased operating in April, in the coming weeks.

== Rendezvous, capture, and boost plan ==
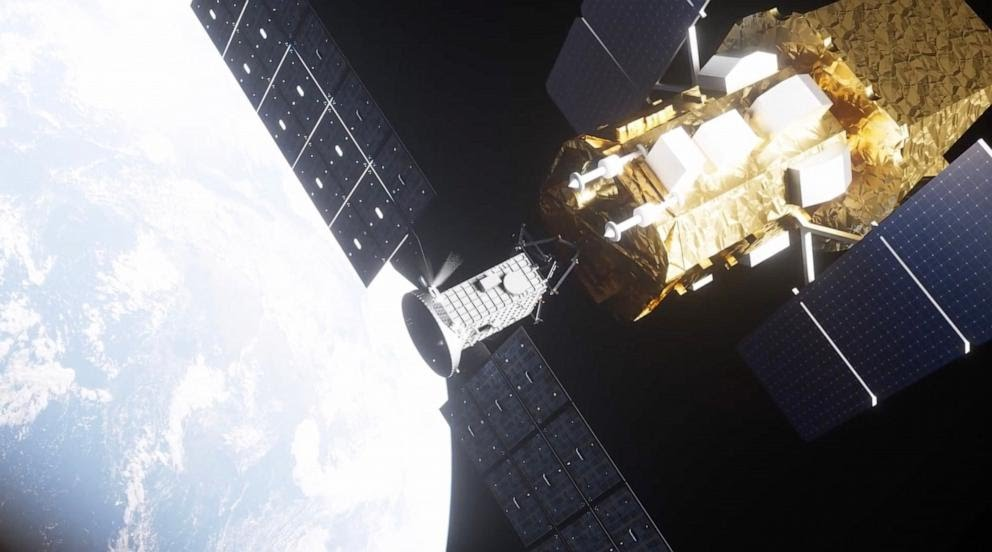
Artist impression of the LINK spacecraft (center) with Swift captured

Katalyst originally anticipated post-launch vehicle checkouts to take two weeks, followed by two to three weeks for rendezvous and inspection of Swift, and one to two weeks for close approach and capture.

LINK was equipped with three parallel manipulator robotic arms, described as a "split Stewart platform", each equipped with lidar sensors and three-degree-of-freedom grippers. The boost could be performed with capture by one arm, but three offered better control.

Swift was not designed for on-orbit servicing, and does not have a docking port or grappling fixtures. Instead, LINK would have attempted to attach to ground-handling flanges on the bus. Upon approaching within tens of meters, the two spacecraft would have performed tandem operations to allow for visual inspection of the intended and backup gripping points, to ensure they are unobstructed (such as by torn multi-layer insulation) before attempting to dock. No close-out photographs of Swift's base are available, and prior experience with servicing missions to Hubble revealed that multi-layer insulation may become embrittled in the space environment, leading it to shatter on contact, which would risk damaging Swift.

The docking procedure was validated in a robotic testbed on an air bearing table, with a full-scale model of Swift's base. Swift was described as "unprepared but cooperative" in that it is capable of coordinated attitude control to assist with inspection and docking. The docking procedure included several go/no-go decision points requiring approval of both vehicles' operations teams, with the ability to abort and retry if necessary.

Once docked, LINK would have raised Swift's orbit over a period of about three months, using three Hall-effect thrusters with xenon propellant, gimballed to align with the center of mass of the stacked vehicles, as well as sixteen reaction control system thrusters. LINK was to perform attitude control for the stack, despite being significantly less massive, at 425 kg (937 lb), than Swift, at 1,470 kg (3,240 lb).

Following the boost, LINK would have undocked and distanced itself from Swift, which would have required about a month for recommissioning before returning to science operations. LINK would potentially have pursued additional test objectives. Before passivation, LINK would have used its remaining fuel to decrease its altitude in order to accelerate its reentry.

Swift mission director John Van Eepoel said "The Swift boost attempt is a fast, high-risk, high-reward mission". If the boost had been successful, Swift's operational life was expected to be extended by at least ten years.

== LINK development ==
Development of Katalyst's LINK spacecraft occurred under a greatly accelerated timeline. Katalyst built some parts of the spacecraft that would normally be supplied externally, due to the inability of vendors to meet the tight timeline, and performed a limited suite of testing before delivering the spacecraft to the launch provider. Shawn Domagal-Goldman, director of NASA's astrophysics division, described the choice of which tests to skip due to time constraints as "gut wrenching" for the engineers. Katalyst's principal investigator for the mission, Kieran Wilson, stated: "We didn't have a systems engineering organization...We didn't have the traditional structure that you would see for most places that are trying to do something like this—a very complicated mission."

The US federal government shutdown of October 2025 began five days after the contract award, and NASA's procurement team was forced to scramble to ensure payments to Katalyst for hardware purchasing went out before the shutdown began. Swift mission director John Van Eepoel described this as a "heroic and herculean movement with people knowing how to make the procurement system just shake the money free."

Environmental testing at Goddard completed on May 4, 2026, just eight months after contract award, and launch occurring two months later; a comparable mission would typically have a development time of many years from award to launch. Following environmental testing, the spacecraft returned to Katalyst's Broomfield, Colorado facility for additional testing. The Pegasus air-launch system was selected partly for its ability to launch into Swift's low, 20.6 degree inclination.

== Launch and commissioning ==
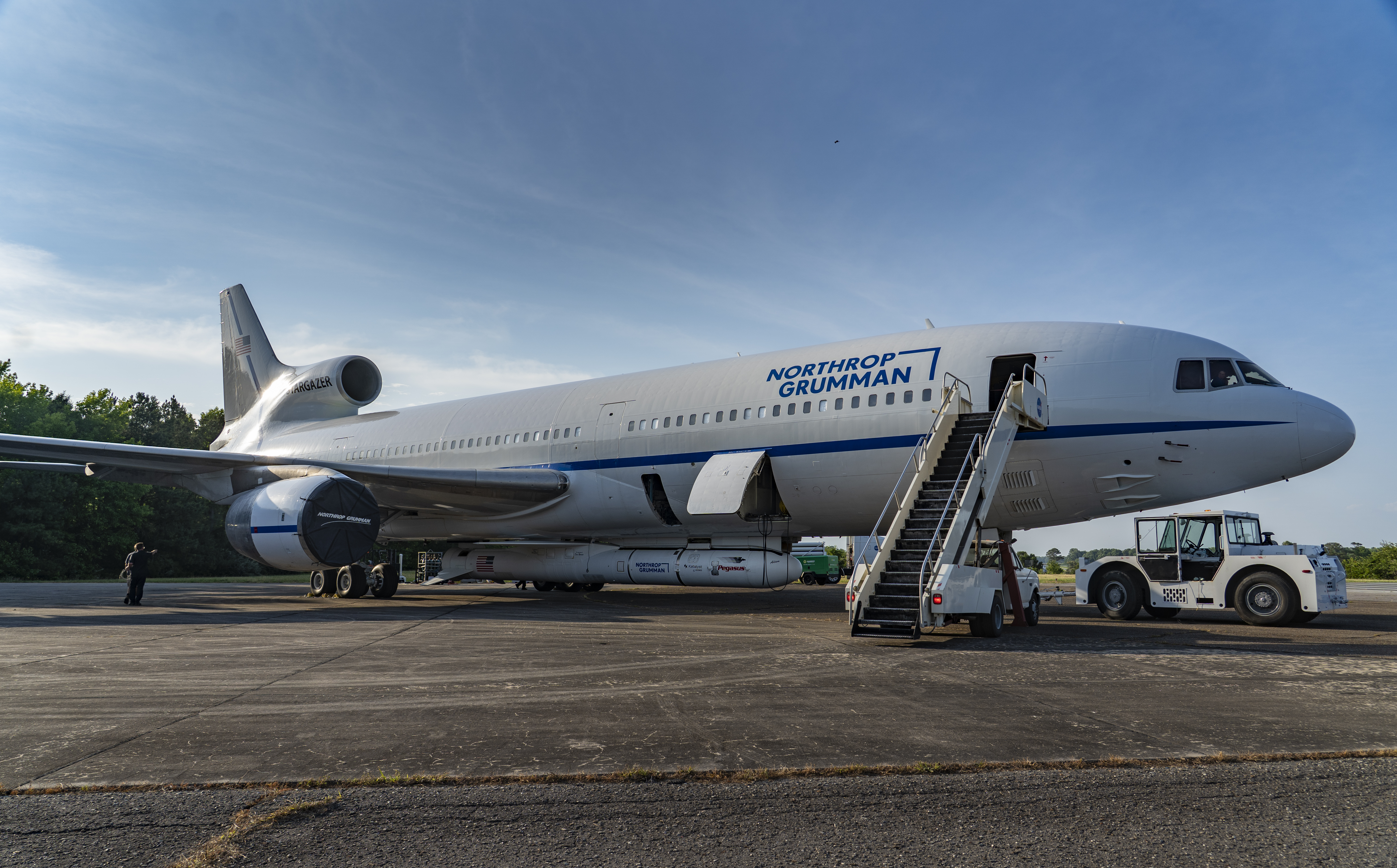
Pegasus XL rocket mated under Stargazer for Swift boost mission

On June 5, the LINK spacecraft arrived at Wallops Flight Facility in Virginia to be mated to the Pegasus XL rocket. Integration of the spacecraft and rocket was completed on June 9, mating of the rocket to the Stargazer aircraft was completed on June 12, and Stargazer departed Wallops on June 18 for the launch site at Kwajalein Atoll in the Marshall Islands, arriving June 25. Following launch scrubs for weather on June 30 and July 1, and a scrub for a technical issue with the launch vehicle on July 2, the spacecraft was successfully launched on July 3, 2026, at 08:36 UTC. This was the last planned launch of a Pegasus rocket. Katalyst confirmed the day after launch that the spacecraft deployed successfully, and checkouts and commissioning had begun.

On July 15, twelve days after launch, NASA reported that spacecraft commissioning was about half complete, with power systems and avionics commissioned, and propulsion system checkouts performed. Early issues with communications and attitude control were addressed with patches to flight software and updates to operating procedures.

== Technical issues and descoping ==
On July 25, LINK lost attitude control and began to tumble, causing communications failures and a bus reset. Once communication was restored, analysis determined that two of the vehicle's three reaction wheels were not operable, and its cold gas thruster system was also degraded. The spacecraft remained able to generate sufficient power, and its operations team began working to stop the spin using one of the vehicle's two-axis gimballed electric thrusters.

LINK's spin was incrementally slowed from an initial nine degrees per second to 1.47 degrees per second as of August 5, where it remained while preparations continued for the next phase of the mission. Less than 100 grams (3.5 oz) of propellant were consumed to control the spin, out of the 60 kilograms (130 lb) LINK launched with. Katalyst also began working with NASA to develop a new attitude controller to adjust for the degraded state of the vehicle. This new controller was uplinked on August 11, allowing Katalyst to begin a series of maneuvers to align LINK's orbit with Swift's.

Following the ongoing attitude control problems and increased propellent use owing to reliance on the RCS thrusters, Katalyst Space announced on August 19 that it had abandoned the attempt to boost Swift, and would simply conduct rendezvous and proximity tests around Swift while its vehicle remained in orbit. LINK came within 12–15 km (7.5–9.3 mi) of Swift. It reentered on September 25, after 85 days in orbit. As a result of the failure to boost Swift, Katalyst did not receive its final payment from NASA.

=== Cause ===
The reaction wheel failures were reportedly caused by a temperature spike in their control electronics, resulting from the hard bus reset that occurred automatically after twenty-four hours without contact. The cause of the original spin had not been determined as of August 1. Katalyst expected to be able to downlink additional data on its condition, including photographs to determine whether the vehicle was struck by space debris. As of August 11, no root cause has been announced.

Following the mission, LINK principal investigator Kieran Wilson described the staffing of the power systems team as "overly light", adding "the engineers we had were overly stretched in too many different directions" and "we just did not have enough time or people to test that with the level of care that was necessary."

== See also ==
- 2026 in spaceflight
- Mission Extension Vehicle, a vehicle intended to service spacecraft in geosynchronous orbit
- Robotic Servicing of Geosynchronous Satellites program
