= Repair Satellite Prototype =

2018 microsatellite with two robotic arms

RSat-P (Repair Satellite-Prototype)
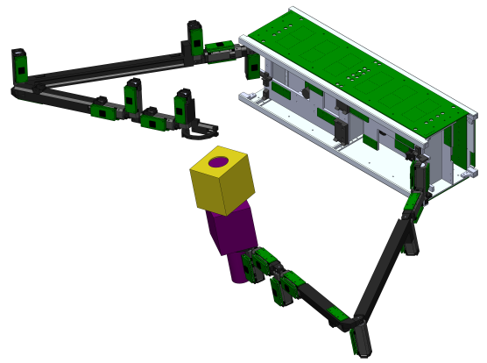
- Diagram of RSat-P manipulating an object with its two robotic arms.
- Names: Repair Satellite-Prototype
- Mission type: Technology demonstration
- Operator: United States Naval Academy (USNA)
- COSPAR ID: 2018-104F
- SATCAT no.: 43854
- Mission duration: 7 years, 5 months, 5 days (in progress)

Spacecraft properties
- Spacecraft: RSat-P
- Spacecraft type: CubeSat
- Bus: 3U CubeSat
- Manufacturer: United States Naval Academy (USNA)
- Launch mass: ≈ 5 kg (11 lb)
- Dimensions: 10 × 10 × 30 cm (3U)

Start of mission
- Launch date: 16 December 2018, 06:33:00 UTC
- Rocket: Electron
- Launch site: Mahia LC-1A
- Contractor: Rocket Lab

Orbital parameters
- Reference system: Geocentric orbit
- Regime: Low Earth orbit

RSat-P (Repair Satellite-Prototype) is a microsatellite built by the United States Naval Academy (USNA) in Annapolis, Maryland. The small spacecraft is a 3U CubeSat intended to demonstrate capabilities for minor in-orbit repair of a much larger, conventional spacecraft.

RSat-P was launched on 16 December 2018 on an Electron rocket as part of NASA's Educational Launch of Nanosatellites (ELaNa) Mission 19.

While the satellite has never been identified, all the objects classified from its launch have decayed, with RSat-P being one of the unidentified ones among those.

== Overview ==
It has been determined that about 1/3 of all commercial spacecraft failures originate on their solar panel deployment, wiring, sunshield, or antenna deployment, so RSat-P was designed to test the potential of a CubeSat to fix such small-scale large-impact failures. Potential deployments include an RSat embedded in its host spacecraft, where it uses its claws to crawl along the failed spacecraft to diagnose and repair. Alternatively, an RSat could be released from a nearby constellation spacecraft in combination with a propulsive BRICSat unit to reach the failed spacecraft.

While the RSat may be limited to diagnostics and minor repairs, more complex servicing would be performed by a large spacecraft called Robotic Servicing of Geosynchronous Satellites (RSGS), that is being developed by the Defense Advanced Research Projects Agency (DARPA).

The team includes Edward Hanlon, Benjamin Keegan and Morgan Lange, Jacob Pittman, Gavin Roser and Dakota Wenberg; the adviser is Jin Kang. In 2017, the team was awarded the Secretary of the Navy's Innovation Scholar Award, at a ceremony at The Pentagon, for their research project. The first robotic arm prototype was scheduled for a launch in early 2017, but was postponed for December 2018.

== Description ==
RSat-P is a small 3U CubeSat that is part of the Autonomous On-orbit Diagnostic System (AMODS) being developed by the U.S. Naval Academy satellite laboratory to demonstrate diagnostic and repair capabilities by validating some key robotic functions while in orbit. AMODS consists of two main components: RSat and BRICSat, which acts as the propulsive unit for RSat, but for the prototype RSat-P mission, the satellite will not have propulsion. The two robotic arms will be moved through some test patterns to simulate the repair of a damaged spacecraft.

The combined mission of an RSat with BRICSat is called "The Modified BRICSat-RSat Space Experiment" (MBSE), which will be launched some time after the validation of the robotic arms on RSat-P. The electric thrusters on BRICSat are called "Micro-Cathode Arc Thruster" (μCAT), developed by the George Washington University.

=== Robotic arms ===
RSat-P represents the first time robotic arms have been installed on such a small platform. The robotic arms are made of 3D printed carbon fiber, they have 7 degrees-of-freedom each, are 60 cm (24 in) long, and have a total arm-span of 1.5 m (4 ft 11 in). RSat-P has a CMOS camera attached at the center of the body to monitor the accuracy of the arm movements, and there are two more cameras fitted to the claws, enabling the satellite to provide on-demand diagnostic pictures of itself.

== Activities ==
As of 2016, the main tasks to demonstrate in this mission include:

- Navigate and coordinate: to demonstrate that each of the arms is capable of navigating to a precise location for flexible orbital operations.
- Handshake: to demonstrate that RSat-P is capable of operating the arms in proximity to each other.
- Manipulation: to simulates the use of the manipulators to interact with another spacecraft. (A) Arm 1 will pick up a demonstration object from one of the ends of the spacecraft, and move it to within camera range. (B) Arm 2 will then take control of the object. This validates the manipulator design, and demonstrates the precision of the arm.
- Imaging: RSat's arms will move to a variety of positions around the spacecraft and image all six faces.

== See also ==
- Orbital Express
- Space Infrastructure Servicing

== Result of in-orbit tests ==
It was planned that "two robotic arms that will be moved through one or more test patterns to simulate the repair of a damaged spacecraft." The spacecraft finished all tasks assigned to it. RSat was scheduled to perform a variety of tasks such "as touching and grasping an object; and testing two-arm coordination".
