= RRM =

RRM may refer to:

- River and Rowing Museum in Henley-on-Thames, Oxfordshire, England
- Radio resource management
- RNA recognition motif
- Robotic Refueling Mission, carried by STS-135 to the International Space Station
- A Residential Reentry Management facility, the term used by the U.S. Bureau of Prisons for a halfway house
