= Robotic Servicing of Geosynchronous Satellites program =

Satellite-servicing project

RSGS payload in a vacuum chamber with robotic arms extended

Robotic Servicing of Geosynchronous Satellites (RSGS) is a DARPA program to develop a robotic spacecraft capable of rendezvousing, inspecting, and repairing aging or broken satellites in geosynchronous Earth orbit (GEO), about 35,786 kilometers (22,236 miles) from Earth.

The RSGS program began as a public-private partnership between DARPA and a commercial partner. The robotic payload was designed and integrated by the Naval Center for Space Technology of the U.S. Naval Research Laboratory. The commercial partner owns and operates the RSGS robotic payload once the spacecraft reaches GEO. The RSGS-equipped satellite will be the first long-life US spacecraft to provide multiple in-space servicing, assembly and manufacturing (ISAM) missions.

After Maxar Technologies withdrew from the RSGS program in 2019, Northrop Grumman stepped in as the commercial partner in 2020. On July 21, 2026 the Mission Robotic Vehicle (MRV) carrying the RSGS payload was launched on a SpaceX Falcon 9 rocket.

== Launch ==
The successful launch of the satellite carrying the RSGS payload occurred at 5:15 p.m., July 21, 2026 from Space Launch Complex 40 at Cape Canaveral Space Force Station on a SpaceX Falcon 9 rocket.

== Background ==
The Robotic Servicing of Geosynchronous Satellites (RSGS) program of the Defense Advanced Research Projects Agency (DARPA) was developed to give the ability to inspect and repair aging or broken satellites in the geosynchronous Earth orbit (GEO), about 35,786 kilometers (22,236 miles) from Earth.

According to DARPA, no options exist for visual diagnosis, upgrades, or repairs of a malfunctioning satellite's components, thus rendering these satellites space junk. There are many other missions enabled by introducing robotic systems to space operations as well. To gain an understanding of the challenges, DARPA began a program called Spacecraft for the Universal Modification of Orbits (SUMO) in 2003 to demonstrate the feasibility of autonomous proximity operations and grappling of a customer satellite by a space robotic system. The focus of SUMO was tugging spacecraft to other orbits (as the name makes clear), including those currently on orbit that had not been designed for servicing. The demonstration used a laboratory-grade robotic arm mounted to a simulated spacecraft in NCST's proximity operations simulation facility.

A successful demonstration in 2005 led DARPA to fund the development of a space-qualified robotic arm. A solicitation attracted multiple proposers, with Alliance Spacesystems, Inc. of Pasadena, California being selected to develop a flight prototype robotic arm to NRL's specifications. The flight prototype arm was delivered to NRL in 2008 and completed environmental testing in 2009. In the years between 2009 and the start of the RSGS program in 2016, NRL continued to advance general technologies for robotic servicing in space. An interim program at DARPA, called Phoenix, aimed to use robotics to harvest "space junk" in the graveyard orbit beyond GEO and reconfigure it for reuse. Phoenix began in 2011 and developed numerous robotic tools before being discontinued in 2013.

== RSGS program execution ==
In 2014, DARPA determined that it should undertake a flight program for a multi-mission, long-life spacecraft to operate in GEO. Missions under consideration included close inspection of satellites, repositioning them to other orbits, assisting with deployments of solar panels and antennas , and adding external modules. The program solicitation was released in 2016. The solicitation required the commercial partner to build the satellite, or "bus," to carry the robotic payload at their own expense. This was a consideration for transfer of the government-developed technology to the partner. Multiple proposals were received in response. DARPA chose Maxar Technologies as the commercial partner for the RSGS program.

In 2017, a lawsuit was filed by the company OrbitalATK against DARPA. It alleged that the RSGS program was violating the National Space Policy, unfairly competing with and duplicating technology being developed by commercial companies, and other assertions. In July of 2017, the Federal court dismissed the case.

In 2019, Maxar Technologies withdrew from the RSGS program, citing a lack of orders for its GEO satellites rendering the company unable to complete its obligations. DARPA then issued a new solicitation for a new commercial partner.

In 2020, DARPA selected Northrop Grumman's subsidiary SpaceLogistics as its new RSGS partner. Meanwhile, the U.S. Naval Research Laboratory continued work on the RSGS payload with DARPA funding. The robotic arm has completed key tests in 2021. The complete RSGS payload was assembled and subjected to rigorous environmental testing in 2024. It was then provided to Northrop Grumman for integration onto its 3000-kilogram spacecraft named Mission Robotic Vehicle. After launch in 2026, there will be a period for checkout, orbit raising to GEO with electric propulsion, and calibration activities. The MRV is anticipated to start making on-orbit service calls in space in 2027. Envisioned service missions on other satellites include: assisting with orbit adjustments, inspecting satellites, correcting mechanical problems, and installing additional payloads.

== See also ==
- On-orbit satellite servicing
- OSAM-1 (On-orbit Servicing, Assembly, and Manufacturing 1 mission)
- OSAM-2 (On-orbit Servicing, Assembly, and Manufacturing 2 mission)
- Robotic Refueling Mission
- Orbital Express
- Robotic arm
