= Orihime =

Orihime (おりひめ, 織姫, "Weaver Girl") is the Japanese name for the star Vega, also known as Shokujosei (織女星, "Weaver Girl Star") in Japanese.

Orihime may also refer to:

- the weaver girl from the Chinese folk tale The Weaver Girl and the Cowherd
- the weaver girl celebrated in Tanabata, a Japanese festival
- Orihime, a Commuter Rapid Express train operated on the Keihan Main Line
- Orihime, a satellite portion of ETS-VII, also known as KIKU-7
- Orihime Inoue, a character from Bleach
- Orihime Mitsuishi, a character from Aikatsu!
- Orihime Soletta, a character from Sakura Wars

== See also ==
- Hikoboshi (disambiguation), the Japanese name for the star Altair
