= ETS-VII =

Japanese satellite launched in 1997

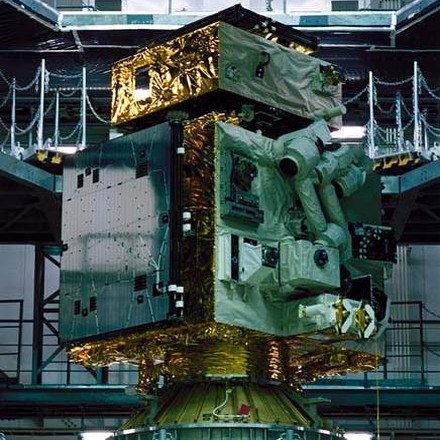
ETS-7

The ETS-VII, or Engineering Test Satellite No. 7, was a satellite developed and launched by the National Space Development Agency of Japan (NASDA). It is also known as KIKU-7. It was launched aboard an H-II rocket from Tanegashima Space Center, on 28 November 1997. The ETS-VII was equipped with a 2-meter-long (6.6 ft) robotic arm, which was used to carry out several experiments related to rendezvous docking and space robotics. It was the world's first satellite to be equipped with a robotic arm, and also Japan's first uncrewed spacecraft to conduct autonomous rendezvous and docking operations successfully, decades after the docking of the Soviet Kosmos 186 and Kosmos 188 spacecraft in 1967. Although it was originally intended to be used for 1.5 years, the satellite was functional for almost five years. ETS-VII eventually decayed from orbit on 13 November 2015.

== Features ==
The ETS-VII consists of two main parts; the chaser satellite and the target satellite. The chaser satellite is the main satellite body, and was named Hikoboshi. A 2 m-long (6.6 ft) robotic arm was attached to this part. The smaller target satellite was named Orihime. The box shaped, complete satellite system weighed 2,860 kg. The ETS-VII was equipped with three solar panels, with two on the chaser satellite and one on the target satellite. The satellite was assisted by relative global positioning system (RGPS) navigation.

== Functioning ==
The satellite was launched using an H-II rocket on 28 November 1997. The launching took place at the Tanegashima Space Center in Japan. The orbit of the ETS-VII was at an altitude of 550 km, with an inclination of 35 degrees.

The ETS-VII was built with an intended mission life of 1.5 years, with the mission to be ended in May 1999. However, in March 1999, it was decided to carry out operations for an additional six months because the satellite was in good condition. The last experiment carried out with the ETS-VII was ended on 16 December 1999. All the planned experiments had been carried out by this time, but the satellite was monitored to evaluate its durability. On 30 October 2002, the operating of the ETS-VII was terminated.

NASDA had invited research institutes in Japan and other countries to conduct joint experiments with the ETS-VII. As a result, joint experiments were conducted with organizations such as the European Space Agency (ESA).

== Experiments ==
Three rendezvous docking operations were carried out with the ETS-VII, which involved placing the target satellite 200 mm away from the chaser and using the robot arm to retrieve and hold it in place. Several other experiments were also carried out with the satellite's robotic components. Most of the robot experiments were successfully completed by March 1999, and target satellite handling experiments were carried out in May 1999.

An error occurred during the second rendezvous docking operation which was carried out in August 1998. The troubleshooting to identify this error was done in early March 1999. All previously planned robot experiments were completed by the end of March. Additional experiments were planned and carried out later.

The final rendezvous docking operation was successfully completed on 27 October 1999. The satellite's final robot experiment was carried out on 29 November. Satellite checkout was conducted as the last experimental operation on 15 and 16 December, concluding all operations carried out by the ETS-VII project team.

== See also ==
- Kosmos 186 and Kosmos 188
- Orbital Express
- SPADEX (Space Docking Experiment)
- Robotic Refueling Mission
