= Hikoboshi =

Hikoboshi (ひこぼし/彦星, Male Star) is the Japanese name for the star Altair, also known as Natsuhikoboshi (夏彦星, Summer Male Star) or Kengyūsei (牽牛星, Cow Herder Star) in Japanese.

It may also refer to:

- the cowherd celebrated in the Chinese star festival, Qi Xi
- the cowherd celebrated in the Japanese star festival, Tanabata influenced by Qi Xi
- Rapid Express (快速急行, Kaisoku Kyūkō) trains operated on the Keihan Main Line in Osaka, Japan
- the chaser satellite of the Japanese Engineering Test Satellite ETS-VII, also known as KIKU-7

== See also ==
- Orihime (disambiguation), the Japanese name for the star Vega
