= Intelsat 10-02 =

Communications satellite by Intelsat

- Names: IS 10-02; Intelsat 1002; Intelsat Alpha-2; Intelsat X-02; IS-1002; Thor 10-02
- Mission type: Communications
- Operator: Intelsat
- COSPAR ID: 2004-022A
- SATCAT no.: 28358
- Mission duration: 13 years (planned); 22 years, 1 month, 4 days (elapsed)

Spacecraft properties
- Spacecraft type: Eurostar (satellite bus)
- Bus: Eurostar-3000
- Manufacturer: EADS Astrium
- Launch mass: 5,576 kg (12,293 lb)
- Dimensions: 7.5 × 2.9 × 2.4 m (24.6 × 9.5 × 7.9 ft)
- Power: 15.7 kW

Start of mission
- Launch date: 16 June 2004, 22:27:00 UTC
- Rocket: Proton-M / Briz-M
- Launch site: Baikonur, Site 200/39
- Contractor: Khrunichev State Research and Production Space Center
- Entered service: August 2004

Orbital parameters
- Reference system: Geocentric orbit
- Regime: Geostationary orbit
- Longitude: 1° West

Transponders
- Band: 106 transponders: 70 C-band; 36 Ku-band
- Coverage area: South America, Europe, Africa, Middle East

Docking with MEV-2
- Docking date: 12 April 2021, 17:34 UTC
- Undocking date: 2026 (planned)
- Time docked: 1924 days (in progress); ~5 years(planned)

Intelsat 10-02 (or IS 10-02, Intelsat 1002, IS-1002, Intelsat Alpha-2, Intelsat X-02 and Thor 10-02) is a communications satellite operated by Intelsat. Intelsat 10-02 is the first operational communications satellite to have its service life extended by Mission Extension Vehicle-2, while still in service, in 2021.

== Launch ==
Intelsat 10-02 was launched by a Proton-M launch vehicle from Baikonur Cosmodrome, Kazakhstan, at 22:27:00 UTC on 16 June 2004.

== Capacity and coverage ==
The 5,576 kg (12,293 lb) satellite provides digital broadcasting, telephone, and broadband internet access to users in Europe, South America, Africa and the Middle East through its 36 Ku-band, and 70 C-band transponders after parking over 1° West longitude.

== Thor 10-02 ==
Telenor uses half of the Ku-band capacity of the satellite, which is marketed as Thor 10-02.

== Docking to MEV-2 ==
On 12 April 2021, Northrop Grumman's MEV-2 satellite successfully rendezvoused and docked to Intelsat 10-02. MEV-2 will extend IS 10-02's service life by returning it to a proper geosynchronous orbit. The maneuver was completed at 17:34 UTC, marking the first time a satellite servicer has docked with an in-service commercial satellite in geosynchronous orbit (GEO). The two spacecraft will stay locked together for five years to extend the life of IS 10-02, which was running low on fuel after being in orbit since 2004.

== See also ==
- 2004 in spaceflight
- Mission Extension Vehicle
