= Rapidly Attachable Fluid Transfer Interface =

Rapidly Attachable Fluid Transfer Interface (RAFTI) is a standard interface developed by Orbit Fab for transferring fluids, e.g., propellants, in space. It has been defined by a group of 30 companies.

The interface specification has high and low pressure variants, both for operation between -40 °C and 120 °C.

- Low pressure : for MMH, UDMH, Water, H_{2}O_{2}, Methanol, Kerosene, Green Monoprops, isopropyl alcohol, HFE, N_{2}O. (fluids)
- High pressure : for Nitrogen, Helium, Xenon, Krypton. (gases)

== History - timeline ==
2020: A first implementation is planned to be tested in space in 2021 as part of a prototype fuel depot.

A free flying orbital demo was launched in June 2021 to test transfers of high-test peroxide.

In 2024, Orbit Fab announced production ramp up and prices, and that three SpaceForce Tetra 5 satellites would be launched in 2025 with RAFTI interfaces for a refuelling demo in geostationary orbit.

== See also ==
- Robotic Refueling Mission NASA tests on the ISS (including cryogenic)
