= Space Infrastructure Servicing =

Canadian spacecraft concept for in-orbit servicing

Space Infrastructure Servicing (SIS) is a spacecraft concept being developed by Canadian aerospace firm MDA to operate as a small-scale in-space refueling depot for communication satellites in geosynchronous orbit.

In June 2017, SSL (MDA's Palo Alto, California company) announced its first commercial customer, Luxembourg-based satellite owner / operator SES S.A.

Maxar acquired SSL, then in 2019, SSL abandoned the SSP project.

== History ==
MDA Corporation announced in early 2010 that a small-scale geosynchronous-orbit refueling project was under development. The design point was to be a single spacecraft that would refuel other spacecraft in orbit as a satellite-servicing demonstration. The 2010 announcement indicated that MDA had already signed an option agreement "with an unidentified satellite fleet operator that has agreed to provide an aging telecommunications spacecraft for a refueling operation as the inaugural customer". Missions contemplated included not only satellite refueling but also space debris mitigation by including the vehicle capability to "push dead satellites into graveyard orbits".

The early technical design point included a fuel-depot vehicle that would maneuver to an operational communications satellite, dock at the target satellite's apogee kick motor, remove a small part of the target spacecraft's thermal protection blanket, connect to a fuel-pressure line and deliver the propellant. In 2010, it was estimated that "the docking maneuver would take the communications satellite out of service for about 20 minutes".

A potential business model for the service, as of March 2010, would "ask customers to pay per kilogram of fuel successfully added to their satellite, with the per-kilogram price being a function of the additional revenue the operator can expect to generate from the spacecraft's extended operational life".

In March 2011, MDA announced that Intelsat was to be their inaugural launch partner and that the SIS vehicle could be ready to launch as early as 2015, with Intelsat providing up to US$280 million over the timeframe that the on-orbit services would be delivered to a portion of the Intelsat satellite fleet.

As of November 2011, MDA suspended the satellite servicing mission while awaiting major decisions due soon on the scope and details on planned satellite servicing missions by U.S. government civilian and defence agencies NASA and DARPA. MDA wants to "see the NASA and DARPA bid requests, see what's in them, whether [MDA] can bid as a Canadian company, or as a U.S. company". MDA Chief Executive Officer Daniel E. Friedmann said "We can't just go ahead. I know everybody says the government is not a competitor, and yes, literally they are not a competitor. But our whole business is about winning business from the government and then taking that dual-use technology into the commercial market".

In February 2012, MDA said it was awaiting "a decision on a contract bid to the U.S. Defense Advanced Research Projects Agency (DARPA) before deciding whether to shelve its work on a vehicle to service satellites and perform other chores in orbit".

In a June 2012 article in The Space Review, a number of approaches to satellite servicing were discussed and contrasted. The MDA Space Infrastructure Servicing concept is reported to be somewhat more complex than the competitive ViviSat (Mission Extension Vehicle), and is considered to be similar to the concepts that NASA is investigating experimentally with a test platform called the Robotic Refueling Mission flying on the International Space Station (ISS) during the Expedition 29–32 timeframe in 2011-2013. MDA's approach "would use its manipulators to refuel or repair the spacecraft. The original announcement of the SIS by MDA in March of 2011 envisioned using it to deploy stuck [solar] arrays — like the case of Intelsat 19 — or grapple debris. Direct refueling, robotically, of a satellite is not trivial, but it's fully doable".

By comparison, the DARPA Project Phoenix program has an even more complex mission concept: "cooperatively harvest and re-use valuable components from satellites in orbit that have been retired. DARPA envisions a servicing spacecraft that could remove a solar array, antenna, or other component from a defunct satellite and transport it to another satellite, either a newly constructed spacecraft or one in need or repairs. Phoenix is truly all about going up to retired, non-cooperative, non-controlled satellites that have been left for dead in the geosynchronous graveyard orbit, essentially, and see if we can resurrect capability out of those satellites or those satellite components".

In March 2016, "Robotic Servicing of Geosynchronous Satellites" (RSGS) became DARPA's new name for the Phoenix Project. In February 2017, DARPA selected MDA's Palo Alto, California company, SSL, as their commercial partner for the RSGS Program. In June 2017, SSL announced the formation of Space Infrastructure Services LLC (SIS), its contract to SSL to build SIS's first Robotic Servicing Vehicle, and its first commercial customer, Luxembourg-based satellite owner/operator SES S.A.

=== Abandoned ===
SSL (as Maxar) abandoned the DARPA project in Jan 2019.

== In-space refueling demonstration projects ==
=== MDA ===
As of March 2011, MDA had secured its first major customer for the initial demonstration project. Intelsat entered into a preliminary agreement to purchase one-half of the 2,000 kg (4,400 lb) propellant payload that the MDA spacecraft would carry into geostationary orbit. Such a purchase was projected to add somewhere between two and four years of additional service life for up to five Intelsat satellites, assuming 200 kg of fuel is delivered to each commsat.

SIS was envisioned to carry a toolkit designed to open most of the approximately 40 types of "fueling systems aboard satellites now in geostationary orbit".

==== Technical details ====
The servicing plan for the initial satellite on the demonstration mission was:

- "Intelsat [would] select one of its satellites nearing retirement to be moved into a standard graveyard orbit some 200 to 300 kilometers above the geostationary arc 36,000 kilometers over the equator".
- MDA [was to] "launch the SIS servicer, which [would] rendezvous and dock with the Intelsat satellite, [and attach itself] to the ring around the satellite's apogee-boost motor".
- Controlled from a ground station, "the SIS robotic arm [was to] reach through the nozzle of the apogee motor to find and unscrew the satellite's fuel cap".
- "the SIS vehicle [would then] reclose the fuel cap after delivering the agreed amount of propellant and then head to its next mission".

==== Post-demonstration mission extension ====
In addition to refueling and servicing geostationary Communications satellites with the fuel that is initially launched with the vehicle, the SIS vehicle is being designed to have the ability to orbitally maneuver to rendezvous with a replacement fuel canister after deploying the 2000 kg of fuel in the first load, enabling the further refueling of additional satellites after the initial multi-satellite servicing mission is complete.

=== Technology maturation by NASA ===
MDA's commercial interest in robotic in-space refueling got a boost in 2013 when NASA completed a demonstration mission (phase 2) doing robotic refueling of satellite hardware that had never been designed for refuel. In January 2013, an extensive series of robotically-actuated propellant transfer experiments on the exposed facility platform of the International Space Station (ISS) were completed by the NASA Robotic Refueling Mission (RRM). The NASA Robotic Refueling Mission was launched in 2011. The set of experiments included a number of propellant valves, nozzles and seals similar to those used on a wide variety commercial and government satellites, plus a series of four prototype tools that could be attached to the distal end of a Space Station robotic arm. Each tool was a prototype of a device that "could be used by future satellite servicing missions to refuel spacecraft in orbit. RRM is the first in-space refueling demonstration using a platform and fuel valve representative of most existing satellites, which were never designed for refueling".

== Competitive approaches ==
Competitive design alternatives to in-space reaction control system (RCS) fuel transfer exist. The ViviSat (Mission Extension Vehicle) illustrates one alternative approach that would connect to the target satellite in a similar way as MDA SIS, via the kick motor, but will not transfer fuel. Rather, ViviSat will use "its own thrusters to supply attitude control for the target". ViviSat believes their approach is simpler and can operate at lower cost than MDA, while having the technical ability to dock with a greater number (90%) of the approximately 450 geostationary satellites in orbit.

In September 2012, the Germany DLR Space Administration announced a funded development project to build a two-vehicle set of spacecraft to demonstrate several technologies necessary for on-orbit satellite servicing, including spacecraft refuelling, to enable satellite mission extension and also controlled disposal of a defective satellite. The project is entitled "DEOS" (German orbital servicing mission), and consists of "two satellites, a 'client' and a 'servicer'. The client acts as the satellite requiring maintenance or disposal. The servicer carries out the necessary work on the client". The two spacecraft will be launched together into low Earth orbit of 550 km (340 mi). As of 2012, the mission "will be ready for launch in 2018". EADS Astrium Friedrichshafen is the prime contractor for the definition phase of the DEOS project, with a contract value of approximately €13 million.

== See also ==
- Orbital Express — a 2007 U.S. government-sponsored mission to test in-space satellite servicing with two vehicles designed from the start for on-orbit refueling and subsystem replacement.
- Repair Satellite Prototype – 2018 microsatellite with two robotic arms
