= BRICSat-P =

United States technology demonstration and amateur radio cubesat

- Mission type: Communications
- Operator: U.S. Navy
- COSPAR ID: 2015-025E
- SATCAT no.: 40655

Spacecraft properties
- Bus: 1.5U Cubesat
- Manufacturer: George Washington University
- Launch mass: 1.9 kilograms (4.2 lb)
- Dimensions: 10 by 10 by 15 centimetres (3.9 in × 3.9 in × 5.9 in)

Start of mission
- Launch date: 20 May 2015, 15:05 UTC
- Rocket: Atlas V 501 AV-054
- Launch site: Cape Canaveral SLC-41

End of mission
- Disposal: Decommissioned

Orbital parameters
- Reference system: Geocentric
- Regime: Low Earth
- Semi-major axis: 6,772 kilometres (4,208 mi)
- Eccentricity: 0.109060
- Perigee altitude: 327.8 kilometres (203.7 mi)
- Apogee altitude: 475.5 kilometres (295.5 mi)
- Inclination: 54.9773°
- Period: 92.4 minutes
- RAAN: 320.0527°
- Argument of perigee: 152.7277°
- Mean motion: 15.5764196
- Epoch: 26 June 2018

Transponders
- Band: FM

BRICSat-P or OSCAR 83 (NO-83) previously known as PSat-B, is a U.S. technology demonstration satellite and an amateur radio satellite for Packet Radio. BRICSat-P (Ballistic Reinforced Communication Satellite) is a low cost 1.5U CubeSat built by the U.S. Naval Academy Satellite Lab in collaboration with George Washington University, that will demonstrate on-orbit operation of a Micro-Cathode Arc Thruster (μCAT) electric propulsion system and carries an amateur communication payload.

== Mission ==
A four μCAT thruster head system was placed on one side of the spacecraft around the center of gravity and will de-tumble the satellite from its initial expulsion, demonstrate rotational control about 2 axes, and perform a delta-V end of life scenario. Orbital analyses performed indicate that the four thruster-head system is able to fit in a 1.5U Cubesat with low power consumption such that other subsystems such as communication systems can perform normally. Dynamics analysis has been performed in MATLAB Simulink and STK that shows the thrusters can successfully perform the attitude control maneuvers. The project is fully funded and launched on 20 May 2015.

== Status ==
BRICSat-P suffered from power budget problems and has been unable to support all of its primary missions.

== Frequencies ==
BRICSat has 2 amateur communication payload on boards: APRS constellation transponder with downlink on 437.975 MHz and with uplink on 145.825 MHz 1k2 and 9k6 AX25 PSK31 transponder with a 28.120 MHz uplink (2.5 kHz bandwidth) and a UHF FM downlink.

== See also ==
- OSCAR
