= OSAM-1 =

NASA Spacecraft

OSAM-1 (On-orbit Servicing, Assembly, and Manufacturing 1) was a 2016-2024 conceptual NASA mission and spacecraft designed to test on-orbit refueling of satellites. The program was cancelled in 2024, two years ahead of its planned launch date. It was initially known as Restore-L.

== History ==
Originally scheduled to launch in 2020, its launch at the time of cancellation was planned for no earlier than 2026. The primary objective of the concept mission and spacecraft was the complex refueling of Landsat 7, a satellite launched in 1999, that was not designed for on-orbit servicing. This would have involved grasping the satellite with a mechanical arm, gaining access to the satellite's fuel tank by cutting through insulation and wires and unscrewing a bolt, and then attaching a hose to pump in hydrazine fuel. At the time the mission was conceived, it was expected to be the first refueling of a satellite in space, and a demonstration of the potential to repair some of the thousands of active satellites in orbit and keep them in operation for a longer time. Because the satellites now in space were not designed to be serviced, there are significant challenges to doing so successfully.

OSAM-1's second objective, added in 2020, was to deploy a separate robot called SPIDER (Space Infrastructure Dexterous Robot) to build a new structure in space. Using robots to build and assemble new structural components from scratch would be an important step towards a type of space-based construction that had been impossible to date.

== Description ==
The OSAM-1 spacecraft was to include:

- two arms to grapple the target satellite;
- the attached payload for SPIDER.

== History ==
In 2016, NASA's Restore-L satellite was intended to refuel Landsat 7.

In 2020, SPIDER was added and the name was changed from Restore-L to OSAM-1.

In Feb 2022, OSAM-1 passed its Critical Design Review.

On 04 Sept 2023, NASA notified Congress of their intent to cancel OSAM-1.

On 20 Sept 2023 the satellite bus arrived at NASA Goddard from Maxar.

On 1 March 2024, NASA announced that OSAM-1 had been cancelled due to "continued technical, cost, and schedule challenges, and a broader community evolution away from refueling unprepared spacecraft."

=== Cost & legacy ===
OSAM-1 was funded by NASA’s Space Technology Mission Directorate through its Technology Demonstration Missions program.

At cancellation in 2024, about $2 billion had been invested in the project.

== Progression ==
A subsequent mission, OSAM-2, would have also had two robotic arms. OSAM-2 would have used ModuLink software which is based on xLink. In 2023, NASA decided to conclude the OSAM-2 project without proceeding to a flight demonstration.

== See also ==
- Robotic Refueling Mission
- In-orbit refueling
- Robotic Servicing of Geosynchronous Satellites program – Satellite-servicing project
