= Mission Extension Vehicle =

Spacecraft concept

The Mission Extension Vehicle (MEV) is a spacecraft that extends the functional lifetime of another spacecraft through on-orbit satellite servicing. They are 2010s-design small-scale in-space satellite-refueling spacecraft first launched in 2019. The MEV spacecraft grew out of a concept proposed in 2011 by ViviSat, a 50/50 joint venture of aerospace firms US Space and Alliant Techsystems (ATK). The joint venture was created in 2010 for the purpose of designing, producing and operating the MEV program.

Since the original conception of the MEV program by the ViviSat company, the Vivisat venture was shut down for a time, and the company was dissolved by Orbital ATK in April 2016. The MEV program continued on as a solo-project of Orbital ATK, which was subsequently purchased by Northrop Grumman in 2018. The MEV program continued under Northrop Grumman and in 2019, launched MEV-1 to dock and reposition Intelsat 901, an objective reached in April 2020. Servicing an on-orbit satellite in this way was a space industry first for a telerobotically operated spacecraft, as satellite servicing had previously been accomplished only with on-orbit human assistance in the several missions to service the Hubble Space Telescope.

== History ==
ViviSat proposed the Mission Extension Vehicle (MEV) concept in 2011. At that time, the project was planned to be a 50/50 joint venture of aerospace firms US Space and Alliant Techsystems (ATK), to operate as a small-scale in-space satellite-refueling spacecraft. In the joint venture, ATK was to be responsible for the technical design, production and operation of the satellite, and US Space would be responsible for the financing and business-side of operations.

By March 2012, ViviSat was finalizing its design and was "ready to build" the servicing spacecraft, but had announced no customers for the Mission Extension Vehicle services.

In April 2014, ATK announced that it would merge its Aerospace and Defense Groups with Orbital Sciences Corporation.

In the timeframe 2013–2016, the partners ATK and US Space fell out concerning the joint ViviSat-venture. The situation ended with ATK (which in the meantime in 2015 had merged with Orbital Sciences Corporation to become Orbital ATK) taking control and dissolving the ViviSat-company on 5 April 2016. The MEV program continued as Orbital-ATK only project.

In December 2017, the US telecommunications regulator approved a plan submitted by Orbital ATK to use an MEV to service an Intelsat satellite, Intelsat 901, that was originally launched to geostationary orbit in June 2001 for a planned in-service life of 13 years. That satellite had already been replaced in orbit. The first MEV, MEV-1, was then planned to launch with Eutelsat's Eutelsat 5 West B commsat, no earlier than 2019. MEV-1 also needed a licence from National Oceanic and Atmospheric Administration (NOAA). The NOAA license is required because the MEV-1 has cameras for docking that could also image the Earth, thus necessitating a remote-sensing license.

In 2018, Orbital ATK was acquired by Northrop Grumman to become Northrop Grumman Innovation Systems. The MEV program continues under this new company.

MEV-1 was set to launch on a Russian Proton-M rocket along with Eutelsat 5 West B satellite on 30 September 2019, but the launch was postponed to 9 October 2019 due to issues with the integration of control systems of Briz-M orbit insertion stage and the satellites. MEV-1 was launched on 9 October 2019.

MEV-1 rendezvoused with Intelsat 901 on 25 February 2020 at 07:15 UTC, and by April 2020 had repositioned the commsat so that it could come back on line in its designated geosynchronous spot, a space industry first for a telerobotic spacecraft, and something that had only previously been done on the Hubble Space Telescope servicing missions with direct human assistance. The goal is to extend its operational life by five years via in-orbit stationkeeping. At the end of the five-year mission extension, MEV-1 was used to move the spacecraft back to the graveyard orbit and undocked. The spacecraft will return to GEO for Optus D3, the next target. It is designed to be able to dock and undock additional times, potentially enabling it to service additional satellites.

== Missions ==
Spacecraft	Carrier rocket	Launch (UTC)	Satellite	Docked (UTC)	Undocked (UTC)	Time docked	Remarks
MEV-1	Proton-M	9 October 2019; 10:17:56	Intelsat 901	25 February 2020; 07:15	9 April 2025; 15:04	Elapsed: 6 years, 141 days	First rendezvous and docking in GSO. Intelsat 901 was returned to service on 2 April 2020. End of mission was on 9 April 2025 Intelsat 901 has been placed in the graveyard orbit and the Mission Extension Vehicle is now returning back to GEO to perform the similar operations to Optus D3.
MEV-2	Ariane 5	15 August 2020; 22:04	Intelsat 10-02	12 April 2021; 17:34	2026	Elapsed: 5 years, 95 days	

== Technical capabilities and competition ==
ViviSat saw competition for space servicing business with the 2011 announcement of the Space Infrastructure Servicing (SIS) vehicle from MacDonald, Dettwiler and Associates (MDA). However, the two vehicles intended to operate with different technology approaches. Whilst the ViviSat design connects to the target satellite and uses "its own thrusters to supply attitude control for the target"., SIS MDA would open the satellite's fuel lines, refuel it, then depart.

In a June 2012 article in The Space Review, a number of approaches to satellite servicing were discussed. ViviSat's Mission Extension Vehicle was reported to operate at the "less complex" end of the technology spectrum, which could offer higher reliability and reduced risk to satellite owners.

ViviSat believed their approach was simpler and could operate at lower cost than MDA, while having the technical ability to dock with "90% of the 450 or so geostationary satellites in orbit", whereas MDA SIS could open and refuel only 75%.

"In addition to extending the life of an out-of-fuel satellite, the company could also rescue fueled spacecraft like AEHF-1 by docking with it in its low orbit, using its own motor and fuel to place it in the right orbit, and then moving to another target".

As of 2012, ViviSat planned to use the ATK A700 satellite bus.

== See also ==
- ConeXpress – an ESA concept vehicle to perform the same mission.
- Orbital Express – a 2007 Federal government of the United States, DARPA-sponsored mission to test in-space satellite servicing technologies with two vehicles designed from the start for on-orbit refueling and subsystem replacement.
- Propellant depot
