= ASTRO (satellite) =

Military satellite

- Mission type: Technology
- Operator: DARPA
- COSPAR ID: 2007-006A
- SATCAT no.: 30772
- Mission duration: 4 months

Spacecraft properties
- Manufacturer: Boeing
- Launch mass: 2,400 pounds (1,100 kg)

Start of mission
- Launch date: 9 March 2007, 03:10:00 UTC
- Rocket: Atlas V 401 AV-013
- Launch site: Cape Canaveral SLC-41
- Contractor: United Launch Alliance

End of mission
- Disposal: Decommissioned
- Deactivated: 21 July 2007
- Decay date: 25 October 2013

Orbital parameters
- Reference system: Geocentric
- Regime: Low Earth
- Perigee altitude: 490 kilometers (300 mi)
- Apogee altitude: 498 kilometers (309 mi)
- Inclination: 46.0 degrees
- Period: 94.49 minutes
- Epoch: 9 March 2007

Autonomous Space Transport Robotic Operations (ASTRO), was an American technology demonstration satellite which was operated as part of the Orbital Express program. It was used to demonstrate autonomous servicing and refuelling operations in orbit, performing tests on the NEXTSat satellite which was launched with ASTRO for that purpose. Launched in March 2007, it was operated for four months, and then deactivated in orbit.

ASTRO was launched by United Launch Alliance on an Atlas V 401 rocket; serial number AV-013. The launch occurred at 03:10 UTC on 9 March 2007, from Space Launch Complex 41 at the Cape Canaveral Air Force Station. The launch was contracted by the Space Test Program to launch the STPSat-1 spacecraft, and was named STP-1. It also deployed NEXTSat; as well as FalconSAT-3, CFESat and MidSTAR-1. The launch marked the first time United Launch Alliance had launched an Atlas V, the type having previously been operated by International Launch Services.

ASTRO was a 2,100-pound (950 kg) spacecraft, which was built by Boeing. It had a robotic arm, approx 4 metres when extended. It was able to transfer hydrazine to other satellites/NEXTSat.

It was operated in low Earth orbit. On 9 March 2007, it had a perigee of 490 kilometers (300 mi), an apogee of 498 kilometers (309 mi), 46.0 degrees of inclination, and an orbital period of 94.49 minutes.

After completing operations, the ASTRO and NEXTSat spacecraft were separated, and ASTRO performed a separation burn. On 21 July 2007, ASTRO was deactivated. It re-entered on October 25, 2013 (UTC).
