= Multi-layer insulation =

Thermal insulation using several thin layers

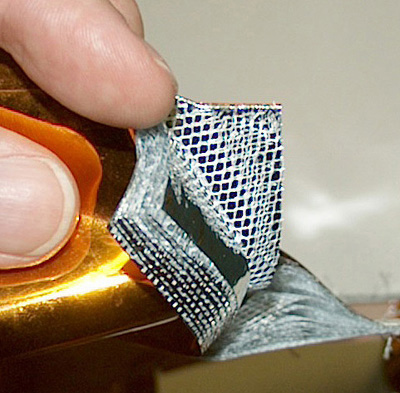
Closeup of Multi-layer insulation from a satellite. The metal coated plastic layers and the scrim separator are visible.

Multi-layer insulation (MLI) is thermal insulation composed of multiple layers of thin sheets and is often used on spacecraft and cryogenics. Also referred to as superinsulation, MLI is one of the main items of the spacecraft thermal design, primarily intended to reduce heat loss by thermal radiation. In its basic form, it does not appreciably insulate against other thermal losses such as heat conduction or convection. It is therefore commonly used on satellites and other applications in vacuum where conduction and convection are much less significant and radiation dominates. MLI gives many satellites and other space probes the appearance of being covered with gold foil which is the effect of the amber-coloured Kapton layer deposited over the silver Aluminized mylar.

For non-spacecraft applications, MLI works only as part of a vacuum insulation system. For use in cryogenics, wrapped MLI can be installed inside the annulus of vacuum jacketed pipes. MLI may also be combined with advanced vacuum insulation for use in high temperature applications.

== Function and design ==
Heat flow balance example with one layer of insulation, reducing heat lost to space. MLI often uses many layers to minimize heat loss.

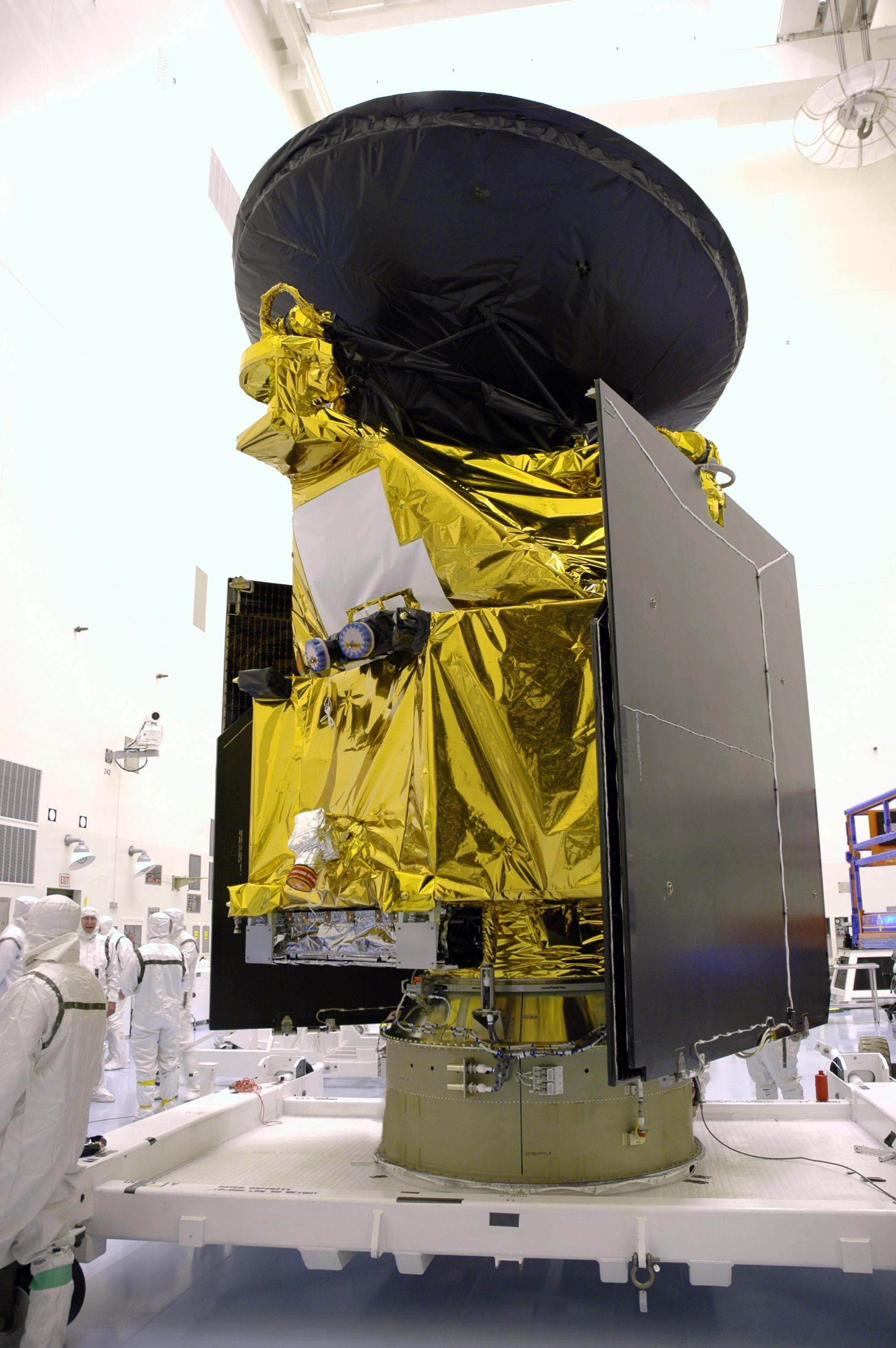
The golden areas are MLI blankets on the Mars Reconnaissance Orbiter

The principle behind MLI is radiation balance. For example, consider a square meter of a surface in outer space, held at a fixed temperature of 300 K (27 °C; 80 °F), with an emissivity of 1, facing away from the sun or other heat sources. From the Stefan–Boltzmann law, this surface will radiate about 460 W. Now imagine placing a thin (but opaque) layer 1 cm (0.4 in) away from the plate, also with an emissivity of 1. This new layer will cool until it is radiating 230 W from each side, at which point the net heat flows are balanced. The new layer receives 460 W from the original plate. This layer also radiates 460 W in total; half is radiated back to the original plate, and half to space. The original surface still radiates 460 W, but gets 230 W back from the new layer, for a net loss of 230 W. Overall, the radiation losses from the surface are reduced by half by adding the additional layer.

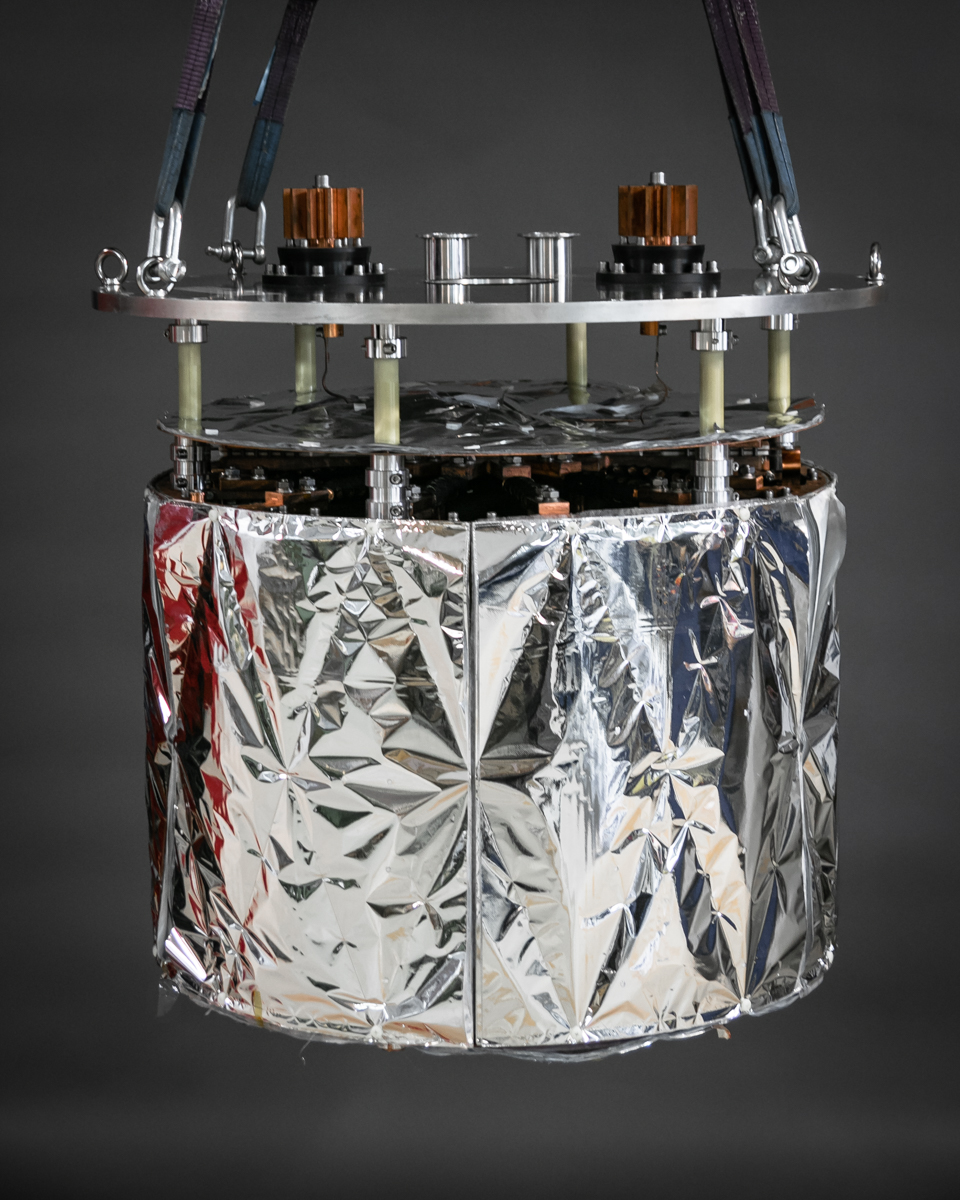
The superconducting Fault Current Limiter covered by a MLI blanket

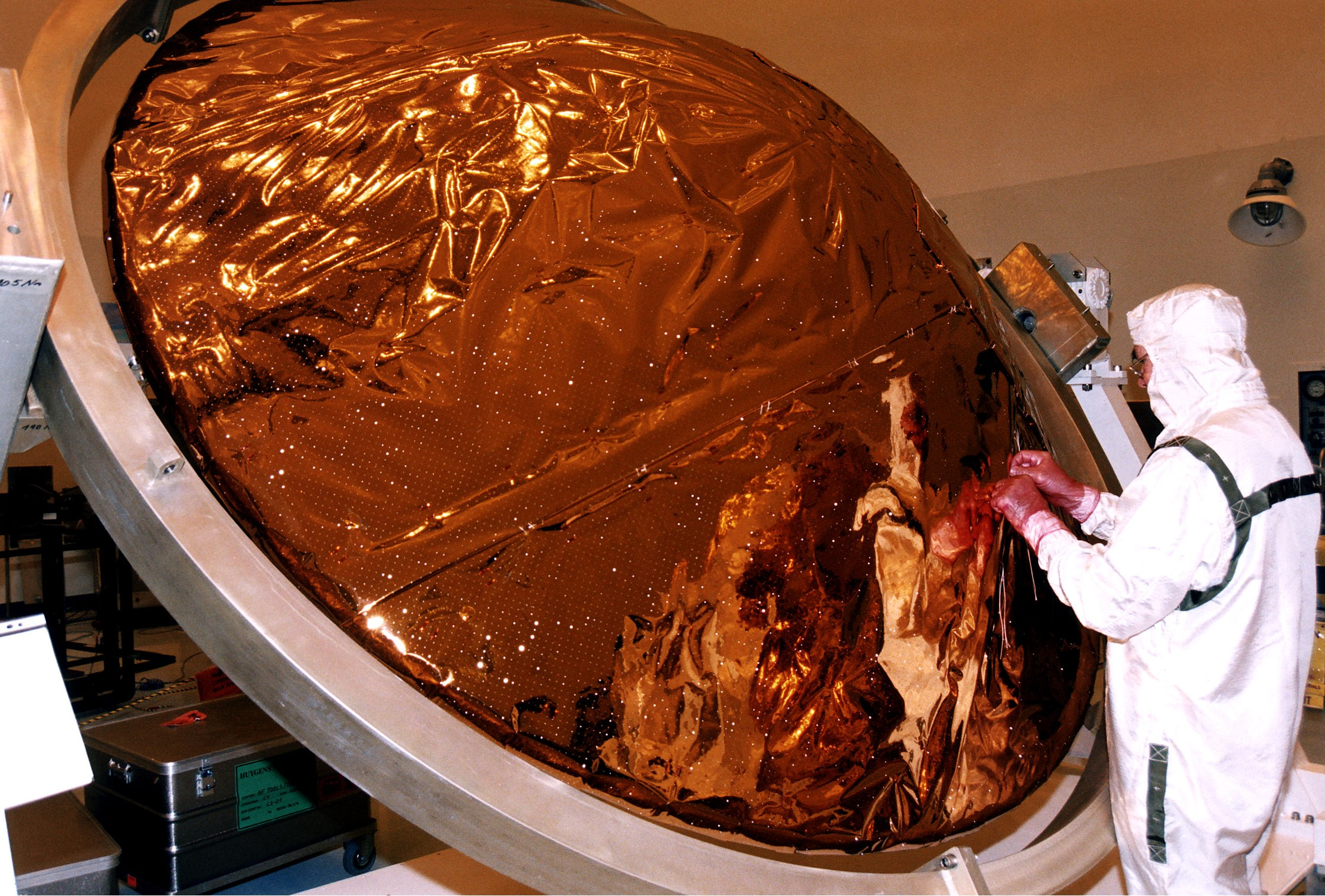
MLI covering the heat shield of the Huygens probe

More layers can be added to reduce the loss further. The blanket can be further improved by making the outside surfaces highly reflective to thermal radiation, which reduces both absorption and emission. The performance of a layer stack can be quantified in terms of its overall heat transfer coefficient U, which defines the radiative heat flow rate Q between two parallel surfaces with a temperature difference $\Delta T$ and area A as

$$Q = U A \Delta T.$$

Theoretically, the heat transfer coefficient between two layers with emissivities $\epsilon_1$ and $\epsilon_2$, at absolute temperatures $T_1$ and $T_2$ under vacuum, is

$$U = \sigma (T_1^2+ T_2^2)(T_1+T_2)\frac{1}{1/\epsilon_1 + 1/\epsilon_2 - 1},$$

where $\sigma=5.67\times10^{-8}$ Wm^{−2}K^{−4} is the Stefan-Boltzmann constant. If the temperature difference is not too large ($|\Delta T|<<(T_1+T_2)/2$, then a stack of N of layers, all with the same emissivity $\epsilon$ on both sides, will have an overall heat transfer coefficient

$$U = 4\sigma T^3 \frac{1}{(N-1)(2/\epsilon - 1)},$$

where $T=(T_1+T_2)/2$ is the average temperature of the layers. Clearly, increasing the number of layers and decreasing the emissivity both lower the heat transfer coefficient, which is equivalent to a higher insulation value. In space, where the apparent outside temperature could be 3 K (cosmic background radiation), the exact U value is different.

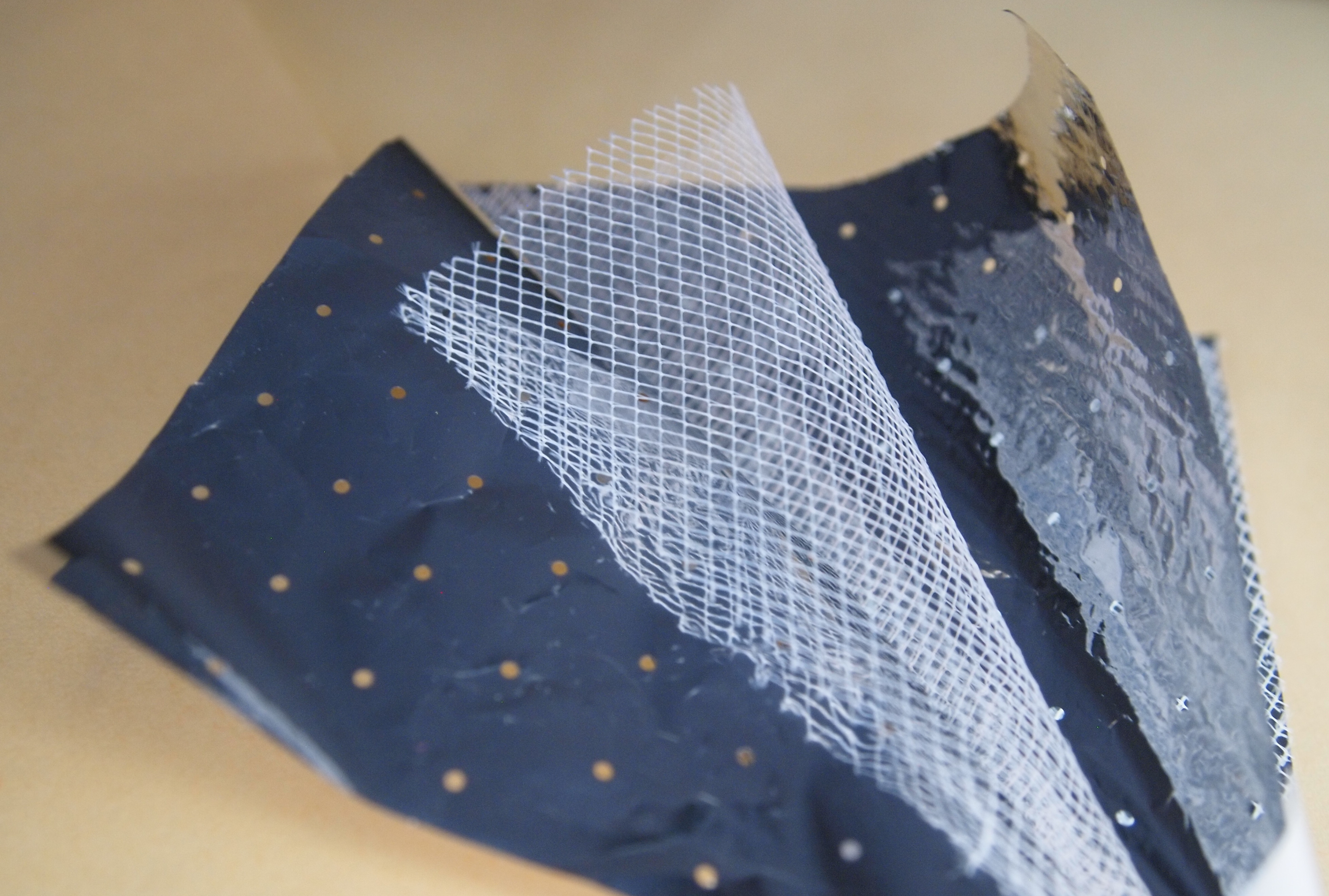
Aluminium coated on both sides of these MLI sheets with thicker outer layer (left), white netting spacer (middle), and thinner inner layer (right) which is also crinkled to provide additional separation between the layers. The sheets are perforated to allow air passage during launch.

The layers of MLI can be arbitrarily close to each other, as long as they are not in thermal contact. The separation space only needs to be minute, which is the function of the extremely thin scrim or polyester 'bridal veil' as shown in the photo. To reduce weight and blanket thickness, the internal layers are made very thin, but they must be opaque to thermal radiation. Since they don't need much structural strength, these internal layers are usually made of very thin plastic, about 6 μm (1/4 mil) thick, such as Mylar or Kapton, coated on one or both sides with a thin layer of metal, typically silver or aluminium. For compactness, the layers are spaced as close to each other as possible, though without touching, since there should be little or no thermal conduction between the layers. A typical insulation blanket has 40 or more layers. The layers may be embossed or crinkled, so they only touch at a few points, or held apart by a thin cloth mesh, or scrim, which can be seen in the picture above. The outer layers must be stronger, and are often thicker and stronger plastic, reinforced with a stronger scrim material such as fiberglass.

In satellite applications, the MLI will be full of air at launch time. As the rocket ascends, this air must be able to escape without damaging the blanket. This may require holes or perforations in the layers, even though this reduces their effectiveness.

In cryogenics, the MLI is the most effective kind of insulation. Therefore, it is commonly used in liquefied gas tanks (e.g. LNG, LN_{2}, LH_{2}, LO_{2}), cryostats, cryogenic pipelines and superconducting devices. Additionally it is valued for its compact size and weight. A blanket composed of 40 layers of MLI has thickness of about 20 mm (0.79 in) and weight of approximately 12 kg/m^{2} (2.5 lb/sq ft).

Methods tend to vary between manufacturers with some MLI blankets being constructed primarily using sewing technology. The layers are cut, stacked on top of each other, and sewn together at the edges.

Other more recent methods include the use of Computer-aided design and Computer-aided manufacturing technology to weld a precise outline of the final blanket shape using Ultrasonic welding onto a "pack" (the final set of layers before the external "skin" is added by hand.)

Seams and gaps in the insulation are responsible for most of the heat leakage through MLI blankets. A new method is being developed to use polyetheretherketone (PEEK) tag pins (similar to plastic hooks used to attach price tags to garments) to fix the film layers in place instead of sewing to improve the thermal performance.

== Additional properties ==
Spacecraft also may use MLI as a first line of defence against dust impacts. This normally means spacing it a centimeter or so away from the surface it is insulating. Also, one or more of the layers may be replaced by a mechanically strong material, such as beta cloth.

In most applications the insulating layers must be grounded, so they cannot build up a charge and arc, causing radio interference. Since the normal construction results in electrical as well as thermal insulation, these applications may include aluminium spacers as opposed to cloth scrim at the points where the blankets are sewn together.

Using similar materials, Single-layer Insulation and Dual-layer insulation (SLI and DLI respectively) are also commonplace on spacecraft.

== See also ==
- Liquid-hydrogen tank car – Railroad vehicle for transporting cryogenic material, on which a form of multi-layer insulation is applied
- Spacecraft thermal control – Process of keeping all parts of a spacecraft within acceptable temperature ranges
