= Robotic Refueling Mission =

Video of the Robotic Refueling Mission phase 1, May 2012.

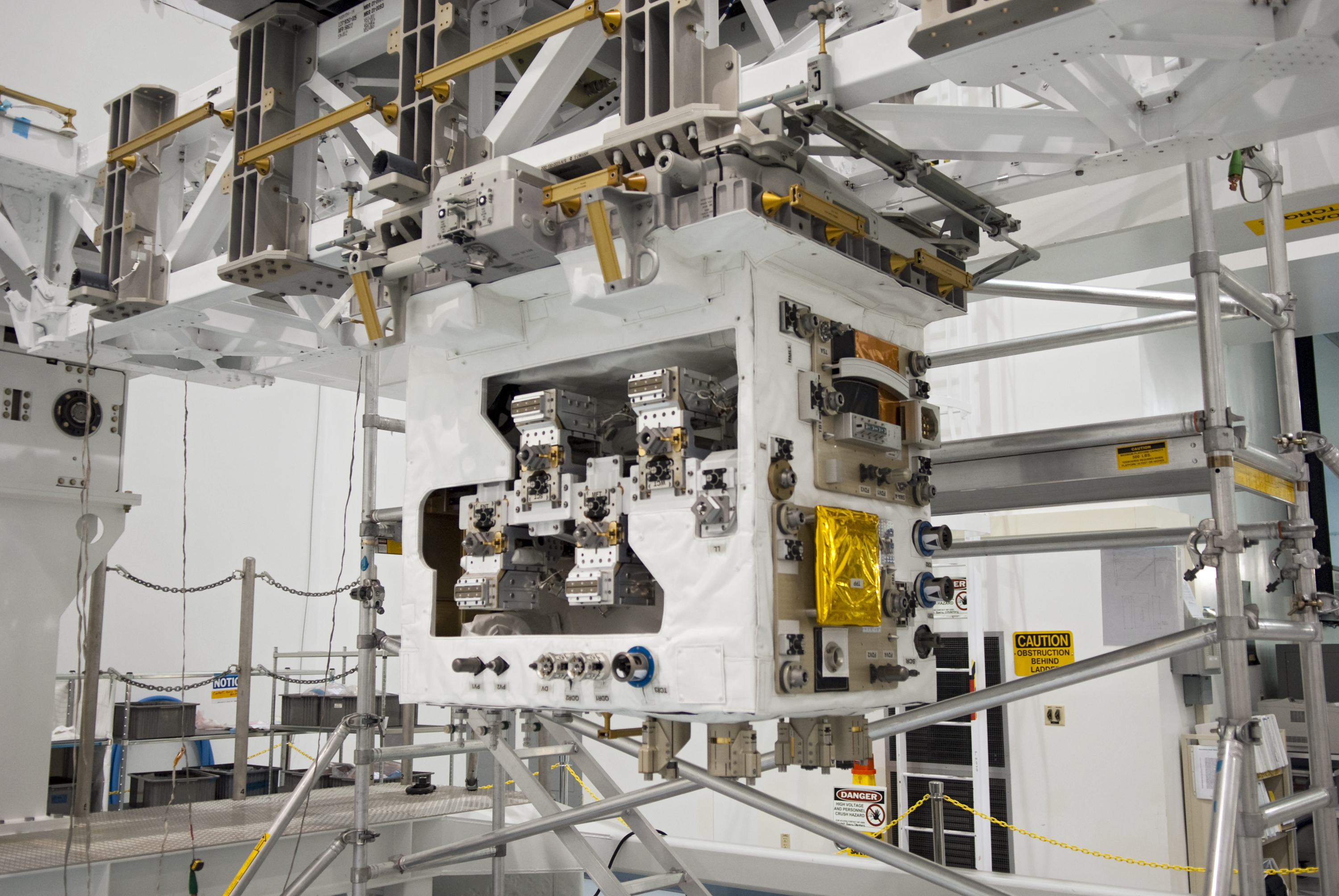
Robotic Refueling Mission (RRM) installed on its Support Structure Carrier. The RRM flew aboard Space Shuttle Atlantis on the STS-135 mission July 2011

The Robotic Refueling Mission (RRM) is a NASA technology demonstration mission with equipment launches in both 2011 and 2013 to increase the technological maturity of in-space rocket propellant transfer technology by testing a wide variety of potential propellant transfer hardware, of both new and existing satellite designs.

The first phase of the mission was successfully completed in 2013. The second phase experiments continued in 2015. The third phase ~2018 suffered a cryocooler failure in 2019 and loss of methane.

== History ==
=== Development ===
The Robotic Refueling Mission was developed by the Satellite Servicing Capabilities Office at the Goddard Space Flight Center (GSFC). It was planned to demonstrate the technology and tools to refuel satellites in orbit by robotic means. After the proof of concept, the long-term goal of NASA is to transfer the technology to the commercial sector.

== Technology demonstration ==
=== Phase 1 ===
RRM was designed with four tools, each with electronics and two cameras and lights. Additionally, it had pumps and controllers and electrical systems such as electrical valves and sensors.

The RRM payload was transported to the Kennedy Space Center in early March 2011, where the GSFC team performed the final preparations for space flight. Once up on the International Space Station, RRM was planned to be installed into the ELC-4. The Dextre robot was planned to be used in 2012 and 2013 during the refueling demonstration experiments.

The RRM phase 1 experiment platform was launched to the International Space Station (ISS) on 8 July 2011, transported by Space Shuttle Atlantis on STS-135, the 135th and final flight mission of the American Space Shuttle program.

The experiment suite included a number of propellant valves, nozzles and seals similar to those used on a wide variety of commercial and U.S. government satellites, plus a series of four prototype tools that could be attached to the distal end of the Dextre robotic arm. Each tool was a prototype of a device that could be used by future satellite servicing missions to refuel spacecraft in orbit.

NASA successfully completed the phase 1 demonstration mission in January 2013, performing a series of robotic refuelings of satellite hardware that had not been designed for refueling . An extensive series of robotically actuated propellant transfer experiments on the exposed facility platform of the International Space Station (ISS) were completed by the RRM equipment suite and the Canadarm/Dextre robotic arm combination.

RRM is the first in-space refueling demonstration using a platform of fuel valves and spacecraft plumbing representative of most existing satellites, which were not designed for refueling.

=== Phase 2 ===
Phase 2 of the RRM mission began in August 2013 with the launch of the phase 2 RRM hardware to the ISS aboard the Japanese H-II Transfer Vehicle 4 (HTV-4) for test operations expected to be carried out in 2014.

The Phase 2 hardware complement consists of:

- Two additional RRM task boards
- The RRM On-orbit Transfer Cage
- The Visual Inspection Poseable Invertebrate Robot (VIPIR)—a "borescope inspection tool that provides a set of eyes for internal satellite repair jobs." It was launched on ATV-5 and arrived at the station in August 2014.

In February 2014 the ground-based 'Remote Robotic Oxidizer Transfer Test' (RROxiTT) transferred nitrogen tetroxide (NTO) via a standard satellite-fueling valve at the satellite fuelling facility, Kennedy Space Center (KSC), using a robot controlled remotely from the Goddard Space Flight Centre, 800 miles (1,300 km) away in Greenbelt, Maryland.

On March 26, 2015, The RRM On-orbit Transfer Cage was loaded into the Kibo airlock and picked up by the JEM Robotic Arm who handed it off to Dextre for installation on the main module.

On April 30, 2015, The RRM On-Orbit Transfer Cage was installed on the main module and the Phase 1 hardware was removed and placed in the cage for disposal on HTV-4. The experiment was then activated that same day.

Phase 2 experiments over some days were successful?

February 2016 the Phase 2 experiment was deactivated and all fuel and cooling lines were turned off in preparation for disposal of the RRM payload and its fuel on SpaceX Dragon CRS-10.

On February 23, 2017, The main module of the RRM experiment and the Phase 2 hardware were removed and stored in the trunk of SpaceX CRS-10 for disposal and the STP H5 experiment with Raven was activated beginning Phase 3.

=== Phase 3 ===
Phase 3 testing needed the delivery of Raven (autonomous space navigation demonstration) on CRS-10. The new Phase 3 module was delivered to the station on December 8, 2018, on SpaceX CRS-16 and installed on the ELC 1 on December 19, 2018. Zero boil off storage of cryogens (methane) was demonstrated for 4 months, but following a cryocooler failure the methane was vented in April 2019. Remaining tests were deferred; these include plugging a fuel nozzle into a refuelling port.

In Oct 2020 the 2nd set of robotic tool operations for RRM3 was completed using the Dextre robot manipulators.

Having completed its mission, RRM3 was transferred to ELC-3 in June 2022. On October 26, 2023, it was installed on an external mounting point on the Cygnus NG-19 cargo spacecraft for eventual disposal when Cygnus departed the ISS and reentered several months later.

== See also ==
- Advanced Cryogenic Evolved Stage – United Launch Alliance second stage proposal that could be used as a propellant depot
- Orbital Express – US project to autonomously service satellites in orbit ~2007, transferred hydrazine
- Propellant depot – Cache of propellant used to refuel spacecraft
- Space Infrastructure Servicing – Canadian spacecraft concept for in-orbit servicing
- Rapidly Attachable Fluid Transfer Interface, for non-cryogenic fluids and gases
- Robotic Servicing of Geosynchronous Satellites program
