= Orbital Express =

US project to autonomously service satellites in orbit ~2007

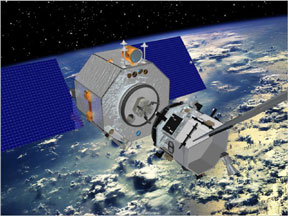
Orbital Express: ASTRO and NEXTSat

Orbital Express was a space mission managed by the United States Defense Advanced Research Projects Agency (DARPA) and a team led by engineers at NASA's Marshall Space Flight Center (MSFC). The Orbital Express program was aimed at developing "a safe and cost-effective approach to autonomously service satellites in orbit". The system consisted of two spacecraft: the ASTRO servicing satellite, and a prototype modular next-generation serviceable satellite; NEXTSat. The mission launched from Cape Canaveral Air Force Station on 8 March 2007, aboard an Atlas V expendable launch vehicle. The launch was part of the United States Air Force Space Test Program STP-1 mission.

== Program management and contractors ==
Orbital Express major subsystem contractors

The Orbital Express program was managed by the DARPA Tactical Technology Office (TTO). The servicing satellite, ASTRO was developed by Boeing Integrated Defense Systems, which included the Orbital Express Demonstration Manipulator System (OEDMS) developed by MacDonald, Dettwiler and Associates. NEXTSat was developed by Ball Aerospace & Technologies Corp. NASA's involvement was through the Automated Systems and Automated Rendezvous and Docking Division of the Engineering Directorate at MSFC. The MSFC Engineering Directorate also managed the Advanced Video Guidance System (AVGS) for Orbital Express project. The refueling mechanism was designed, developed and produced by VACCO Industries. The docking mechanism, as well as the launch adapter, were designed, developed and produced by Sierra Nevada Corporation (SNC) Space Systems.

== Goals ==
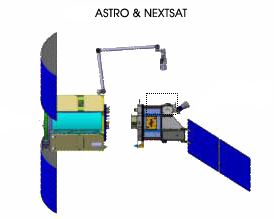
Orbital Express: ASTRO and NEXTSat

The project hoped to demonstrate several satellite servicing operations and technologies including rendezvous, proximity operations and station keeping, capture, docking, fluid transfer (specifically, hydrazine on this mission), and Orbit Replaceable Unit (ORU) transfer. A prime military mission would be to refuel reconnaissance satellites so they can improve coverage, increase surprise and be more survivable.

The fluid (fuel) and ORU (battery) transfers were completed successfully at the lowest levels of spacecraft autonomy. Subsequent transfers over a three-month period were intended to demonstrate greater autonomy.

== Robotics: the Orbital Express Demonstration Manipulator System (OEDMS) ==
The Orbital Express Demonstration Manipulator System (OEDMS), provided by MDA Space, was the mission's integrated robotics solution. It consisted primarily of a 6-DOF rotary joint robotic arm, its flight avionics, the Manipulator Control Unit (MCU) and arm vision system, two On-Orbit Replaceable Units (ORUs) with their spacecraft attachment interfaces, a visual target and grapple fixture installed on NEXTSat, and the Manipulator Ground Segment.

The OEDMS was mounted on the ASTRO. It was used to capture and service the NEXTSat, the client satellite provided by Ball Aerospace. Using a robotic arm on-orbit, the Orbital Express mission demonstrated autonomous capture of a fully unconstrained free-flying client satellite, autonomous transfer of a functional battery ORU between two spacecraft, and autonomous transfer of a functional computer ORU. These operations were executed as part of mission scenarios that demonstrated complete sequences of autonomous rendezvous, capture, berthing and ORU transfer.

All robotic operations were scripted prior to execution and performed autonomously as part of increasingly complex mission scenarios. The arm was commanded to perform its operations by either direct command from the ground, or autonomously by the ASTRO Mission Manager software. Scenarios in the early phases of flight operations incorporated a number of Authority to Proceed (ATP) pause points, which required a signal to be sent from the ground to authorize the ASTRO Mission Manager to continue the sequence. This allowed the ground operations team to verify that the scenario was proceeding as planned before continuing to the next step. Later scenarios incorporated fewer ATPs. The final scenarios were compound autonomous sequences, performing rendezvous, capture, ORU transfer and fluid transfer without any ATPs.

== End of mission ==
The final rendezvous and docking between the two spacecraft occurred on 29 June 2007. This was followed by the final demonstration, the changeout of a flight computer aboard ASTRO. NASA's plans for an extended mission with its own testing objectives from mid-July to September 2007 were abandoned over the cost of such an extended mission. The two craft demated for a final time, with ASTRO backing out to greater than 400 km (250 mi) in a test of sensor performance. Following this the craft performed a rendezvous to a standoff, where decommissioning took place. The NEXTSat spacecraft was deactivated on 21 July, when its computers were turned off, and solar panels pointed away from the Sun. Subsequently, ASTRO vented its Hydrazine propellant, and was deactivated on 22 July 2007. The satellites were left to decay naturally.

NEXTSat was expected to take three to five years to decay, while the heavier ASTRO satellite was expected to take fifteen years. However, ASTRO reentered the atmosphere on 25 October 2013, after only 6.5 years. NEXTSat on the other hand decayed from orbit on 21 April 2023, almost 16 years after decommissioning.

== See also ==
- DART – NASA Autonomous Rendezvous demo 2005
- Kosmos 186 and Kosmos 188
- ETS-VII or KIKU-7, also known as Orihime/Hikoboshi
- Robotic Refueling Mission
- SPADEX (Space Docking Experiment)
