= CFTP =

CFTP may refer to:

- Configurable Fault Tolerant Processor
- Coupling from the past
