= NEXTSat =

American technology demonstration satellite

- Mission type: Technology
- Operator: DARPA
- COSPAR ID: 2007-006C
- SATCAT no.: 30774
- Mission duration: 4 months

Spacecraft properties
- Bus: RS-300
- Manufacturer: Ball Aerospace
- Launch mass: 224 kilograms (494 lb)

Start of mission
- Launch date: 9 March 2007, 03:10 UTC
- Rocket: Atlas V 401 AV-013
- Launch site: Cape Canaveral SLC-41
- Contractor: United Launch Alliance

End of mission
- Disposal: Decommissioned
- Deactivated: 21 July 2007
- Decay date: 21 April 2023

Orbital parameters
- Reference system: Geocentric
- Regime: Low Earth
- Eccentricity: 0.00058
- Perigee altitude: 490 kilometers (300 mi)
- Apogee altitude: 498 kilometers (309 mi)
- Inclination: 46.0 degrees
- Period: 94.5 minutes
- Epoch: 8 May 2007, 22:10:00 UTC

NEXTSat, or Next Generation Satellite and Commodities Spacecraft (NEXTSat/CSC) was an American technology demonstration satellite which was operated as part of the Orbital Express programme. It was used as a target spacecraft for a demonstration of autonomous servicing and refueling operations performed by the ASTRO satellite. Launched in March 2007, it was operated for four months, and then deactivated in orbit.

NEXTSat was launched by United Launch Alliance on an Atlas V 401 rocket; serial number AV-013. The launch occurred at 03:10 UTC on 9 March 2007, from Space Launch Complex 41 at the Cape Canaveral Air Force Station. The launch was contracted by the Space Test Program to launch the STPSat-1 spacecraft, and was named STP-1. It also deployed ASTRO; as well as FalconSAT-3, CFESat and MidSTAR-1. The launch marked the first time United Launch Alliance had launched an Atlas V, the type having previously been operated by International Launch Services.

NEXTSat was a 224-kilogram (494 lb) spacecraft, which was built by Ball Aerospace around the RS-300 satellite bus. It was operated in low Earth orbit; on 9 March 2007, it had a perigee of 490 kilometres (300 mi), an apogee of 498 kilometres (309 mi), 46.0 degrees of inclination, and an orbital period of 94.49 minutes. After completing operations, the ASTRO and NEXTSat spacecraft were separated, and ASTRO performed a separation burn. On 21 July 2007, NEXTSat was deactivated. As of 2007, it was expected to remain in orbit until around 2012. The satellite decayed from orbit on 21 April 2023.
