= MidSTAR =

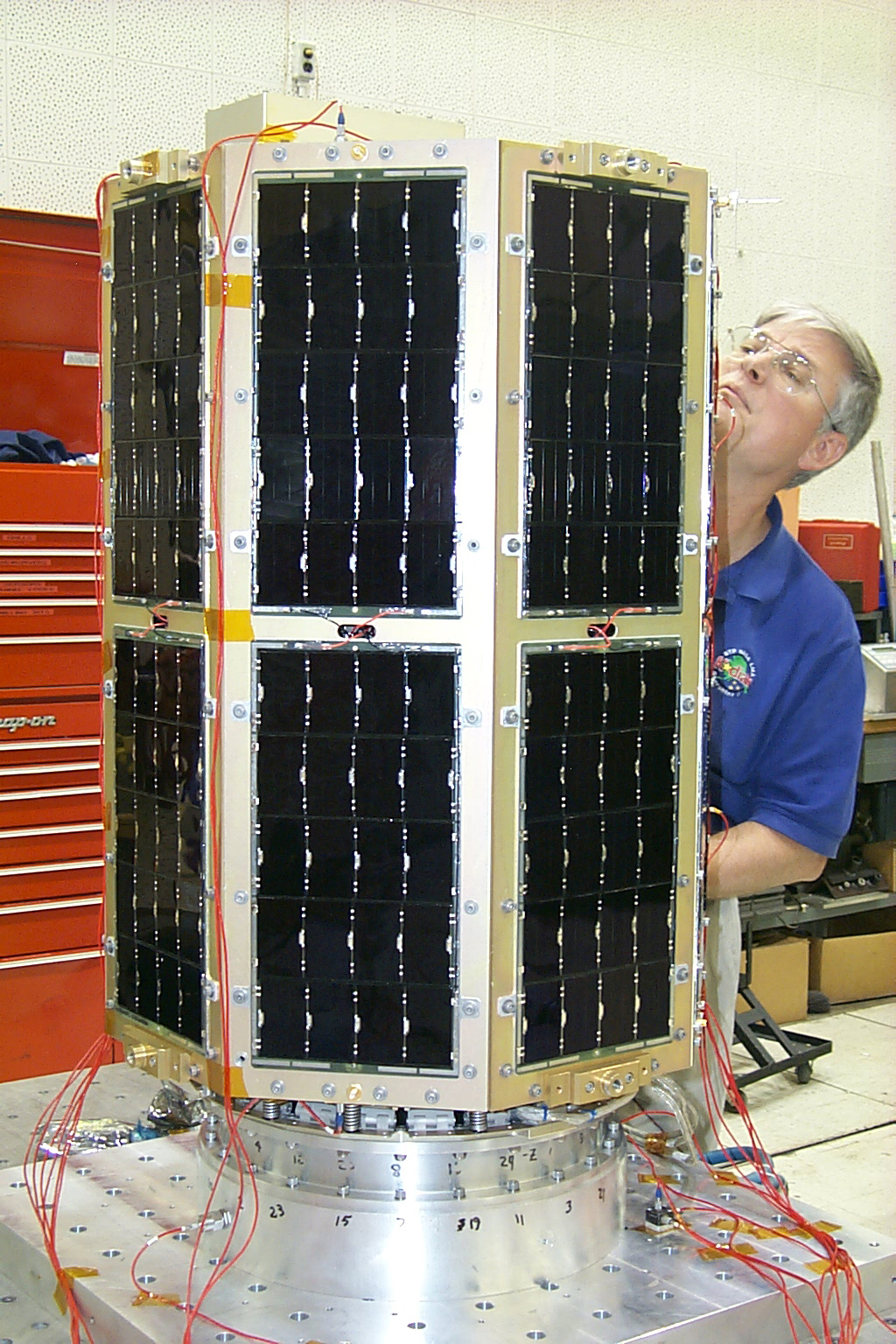
Billy R. Smith Jr., director of the USNA Small Satellite Program and MidSTAR-1 program manager, inspects MidSTAR-1 for damage after vibration testing at the Naval Research Laboratory. Gallium arsenide solar cells cover the sides; the S-band transmit antenna is visible at the upper right. The external neutron detector for the MicroDosimeter Instrument (MiDN) is visible on the top.

MidSTAR, a project of the United States Naval Academy (USNA) Small Satellite Program (SSP), is a general-purpose satellite bus capable of supporting a variety of space missions by easily accommodating a wide range of space experiments and instruments.

== Mission architecture ==
The baseline MidSTAR mission includes a single spacecraft under the command and control of a single satellite ground (SGS) station located at USNA, Annapolis MD. (Lat. 38.98 N, 76.49 W). The ground station forwards downlinked data files to the Principal Investigators via the Internet. Secondary ground control will be available on an as-needed/space-available basis through Naval Postgraduate School (NPS), Monterey CA (36.6 N, 121.89 W). Launch segment for MidSTAR is either the Delta IV or Atlas V EELV. The orbit is tailored to payload requirements; where no requirements exist, the orbit of the primary payload or one of the other secondary payloads is accepted. In order for the spacecraft to be seen from USNA SGS at an elevation greater than 30 degrees and range simultaneously less than 900 km, the must be 500 ± 200 km with inclination greater than 35 degrees.

== Satellites ==
- MidSTAR I
- MidSTAR II, canceled

== See also ==
- United States Naval Academy
