= MidSTAR-1 =

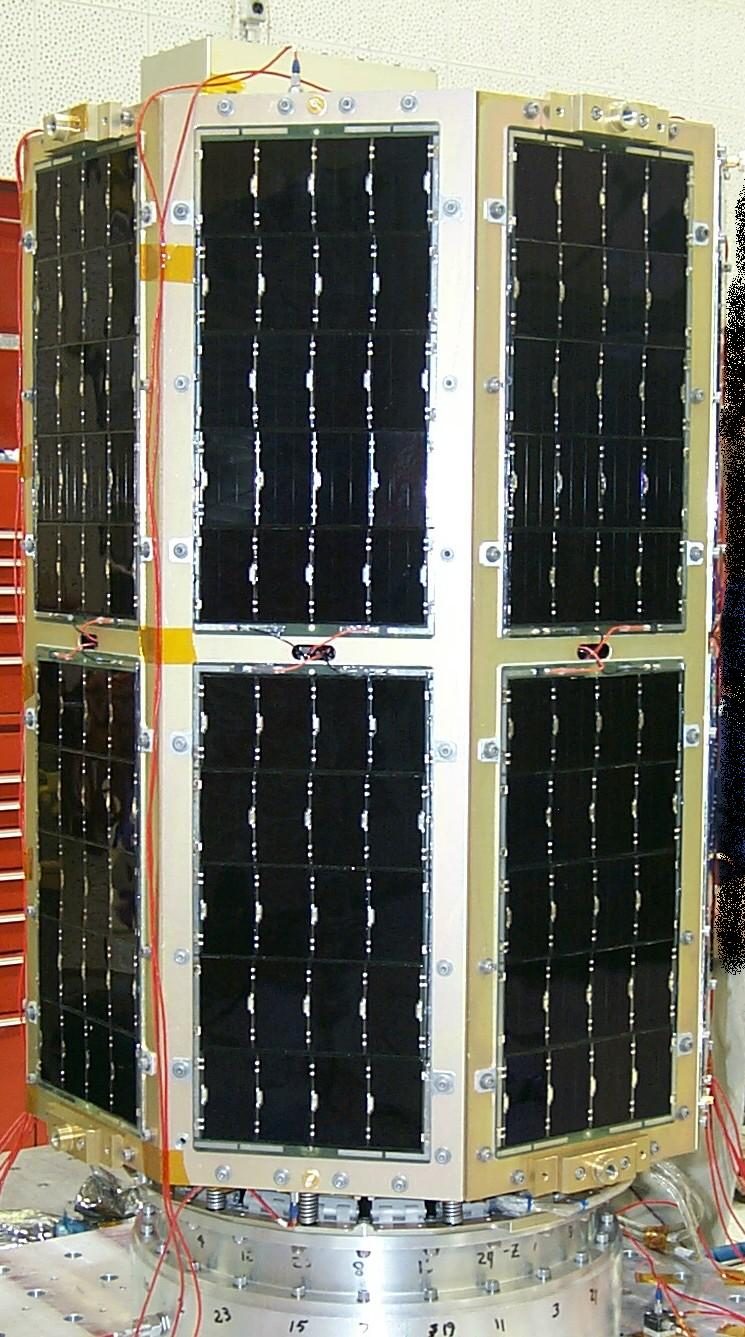
MidSTAR-1

MidSTAR-1 is an artificial satellite produced by the United States Naval Academy Small Satellite Program. It was sponsored by the United States Department of Defense (DoD) Space Test Program (STP), and was launched on March 9, 2007 at 03:10 UTC, aboard an Atlas V expendable launch vehicle from Cape Canaveral Air Force Station. MidSTAR-1 flew along with FalconSat 3, STPSat 1, and CFESat as secondary payloads; the primary payload was Orbital Express.

== MidSTAR-1 Mission (USNA-5) ==
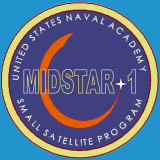
MidSTAR-1 Mission Patch

MidSTAR is a general-purpose satellite bus capable of supporting a variety of space missions by easily accommodating a wide range of space experiments and instruments. The integration of the experiments with the satellite bus must be accomplished with minimal changes to the satellite bus design. MidSTAR is intended to be a relatively low-cost, quick response platform accommodating small payloads approved by the DoD Space Experiments Review Board (SERB) and awaiting launch through STP.

MidSTAR is designed for use on the EELV Secondary Payload Adapter (ESPA) Ring developed by Air Force Research Laboratory (AFRL) for placement on Delta IV or Atlas V expendable launch vehicles. MidSTAR is a Class D spacecraft, produced at minimum cost with a correspondingly higher technical risk in production and operation. It is intentionally simple in design and rugged in construction, using commercial off-the-shelf “plug-and-play” components to the greatest extent possible. Component development and circuit-board level design are accomplished only when necessary.

MidSTAR-1 is the first implementation of the design. It was commissioned by STP to carry the Internet Communications Satellite (ICSat) Experiment for SSP and the Configurable Fault Tolerant Processor (CFTP) Experiment for Naval Postgraduate School (NPS). In addition, MidSTAR-1 carries the Nano Chem Sensor Unit (NCSU) for the National Aeronautics and Space Administration (NASA) Ames Research Center; Eclipse, built by Eclipse Energy Systems, Inc. for NASA Goddard Space Flight Center (GSFC); and the Micro Dosimeter Instrument (MiDN), sponsored by the National Space Biomedical Research Institute (NSBRI) and built by the USNA Department of Aerospace Engineering. The mission is intended to last two years.

== Mission architecture ==
The MidSTAR-1 mission included a single spacecraft under the command and control of a single satellite ground station (SGS) located at the United States Naval Academy, Annapolis, Maryland. The ground station forwarded downlinked data files to the principal investigators via the Internet. The launch segment for MidSTAR-1 utilized an Atlas V launch vehicle through the Space Test Program, placing the satellite in a circular orbit at 496 km altitude, 46 degrees inclination.

The satellite used an uplink at 1.767 GHz with an intermediate frequency (IF) of 435 MHz, and a 2.20226 GHz downlink. By utilizing Gaussian Minimum-Shift Keying modulation, communications with the satellite were achieved at 68.4 kbit/s or higher data rate. The satellite also used open source software based on the Linux operating system. MidSTAR-1 had no attitude control or determination and no active thermal control. The craft had a mass of 118 kg.

One hundred percent success was defined as the successful launch and operation of the satellite with full support for the two primary experiments for two years. Fifty percent success was the successful launch and operation of the satellite with: Full support of one primary experiment for two years; Full support of both primary experiments for one year; or, partial support of both primary experiments for two years. Thirty-three percent success was successful launch of the satellite and full operation of the satellite bus with partial support of any combination of primary and secondary payloads for any length of time.

== Mission log ==
9 March 2007: MidSTAR-1 flew as part of the STP-1 mission on a United Launch Alliance Atlas V from Cape Canaveral Air Force Station. Liftoff occurred at 0310 UTC; spacecraft separation occurred at 0332 UTC. USNA SGS successfully acquired communications with the spacecraft during the first pass over Annapolis MD at 0459 UTC. The spacecraft was operating nominally in safe mode.

21 March 2007: CFTP turned on at 2217 UTC to add 6 W continuous to the electrical power system load and thus lessen charging stress on the batteries.

28 March 2007: MiDN turned on at approximately 2400 UTC. Spacecraft stopped responding to all ground commands subsequent to this pass.

4 April 2007: First use of firecode reset of spacecraft at approximately 2130 UTC. This command toggles the reset switch on the MIP-405 processor and reboots the operating system. This reset returned the CFTP and MiDN experiments to off and cleared all command buffers. At 2324 UTC the spacecraft responded to a transmitter on command. Telemetry confirmed that the reboot was successful.

5 April 2007: CFTP and MiDN turned back on.

6 April 2007: Selective download of MiDN files retrieved 71 files of 92 bytes each which were delivered to the Principal Investigator (PI). This was the first successful retrieval of science data from the spacecraft. With this milestone, MidSTAR-1 satisfied the criteria of 33% mission success.

26 May 2007: NCSU turned on at approximately 1900 Z.

29 May 2007: First data package delivered to NCSU PI. All four experiments are on and delivering data to the PIs.

18 June 2007: NASA press release announces success of NCSU.

5 September 2007: Spacecraft computer froze as a result of unknown influences, most likely radiation-induced upsets. This happened while the spacecraft was in full sun and with the power drains (30 W) on to prevent battery overcharging. Without the computer to cycle the drains off, the spacecraft remained in a continuous negative net power configuration which eventually drained the batteries. When the battery voltage dropped below 8 V, the electronic switches for the drains defaulted to off, returning the spacecraft to positive net power and allowing the batteries to recharge.

7 September 2007: Once the batteries recharged sufficiently, the computer restarted successfully. Restart occurred 48 hours after the initial event. No telemetry from the spacecraft or any experiment is available for that 48-hour period. Telemetry indicates that normal operation resumed, but all experiments were left off pending post-event analysis and the development of a plan to bring them back online.

12 September 2007: CFTP restarted.

21 September 2007: MiDN restarted.

April 2009: Contact with MidSTAR-1 lost. Spacecraft ceased transmitting and failed to respond to ground command. Anomaly attributed to failure of battery packs. MidSTAR-1 declared non-operational. MidSTAR-1 fully supported all onboard experiments for two full years, fulfilling the 100% success criteria.

17 August 2023: the satellite decayed from orbit.

== Structure ==
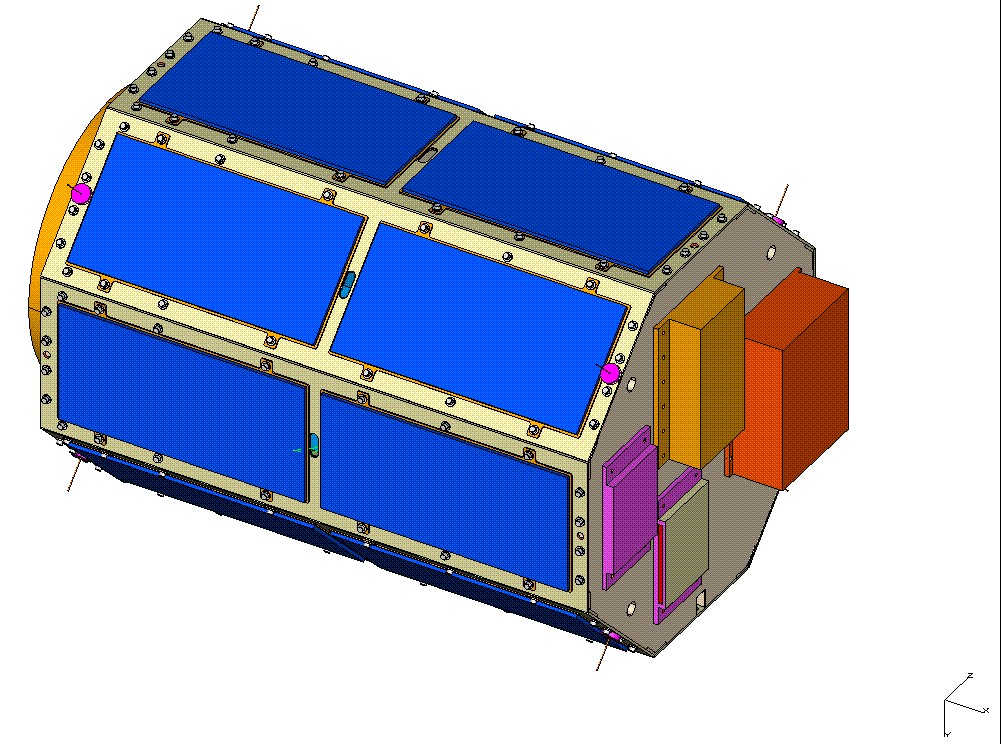

The MidSTAR-1 frame is an octagonal structure 32.5" along the long axis, including separation system, and 21.2"x21.2" measured side-to-side in cross-section. The deployment mechanism is mounted on the negative x face. The positive x face is reserved for externally mounted experiments. Of the 38" along the x-axis allowed in the ESPA envelope, 2-4" are reserved for the deployment mechanism (15-in motorized lightband manufactured by Planetary Systems, Inc.), and 4-6" are reserved for external experiments. The frame length is 30". All eight sides of the spacecraft are covered with solar cells in order to maximize the power available. Eight dipole antennas are mounted on the four faces of the spacecraft which "cut the corners" of the ESPA envelope and are therefore positioned within the ESPA envelope rather than coincident with the envelope surface. The remaining sides are mounted with remove-before-flight eyeholes for lifting and transport during ground support.

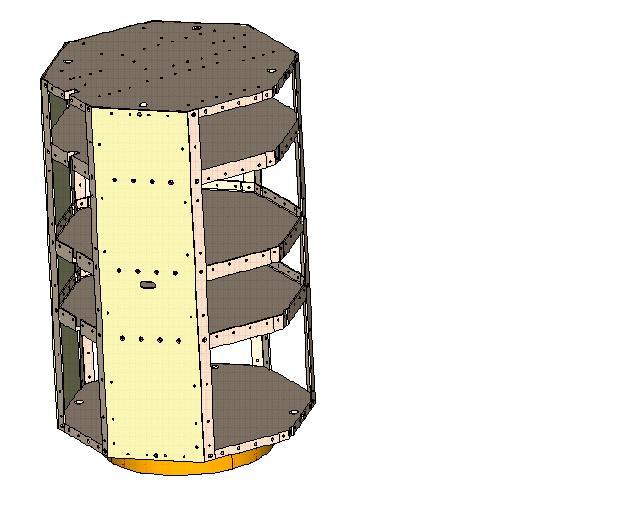

MidSTAR-1 has three interior shelves which provide area inside the satellite for mounting of components and payloads. Their locations are determined by the dimensions of the payloads and components. These can be varied in future implementations of the MidSTAR model, if necessary, as long as the structure remains within the center of gravity requirements. The load-bearing structure of the octagon consists of the top and bottom decks, connected at the eight corners by stringers. The side panels of the spacecraft are 1/8" aluminum panels mounted to the stringers with #10 bolts.

== Command and Data Handling (C&DH) ==
The mission of the Command and Data Handling System (C&DH) is to receive and execute commands; collect, store, and transmit house-keeping data; and support the onboard payloads. The flight computer is designed to control the satellite and manage telemetry and experiment data for a minimum of two years.

The C&DH system consists of a custom-modified MIP405-3X single board computer which included (i) 133 MHz PowerPC processor; (ii) 128 MB ECC; (iii) 4 RS-232 asynchronous serial ports; (iv) 1 Ethernet Port; (v) a PC/104 bus; (vi) a PC/104+ bus; and, (vi) a 202-D384-X Disc on Chip providing 384 MB of secondary storage. The computer board is supported by an ESCC-104 Synchronous Serial Card with 2 synchronous serial ports, and an EMM-8M-XT Serial Expansion Card with 8 RS-232/422/485 asynchronous serial ports and 8 digital I/O channels. A modified I0485 data acquisition board provides 22 analog telemetry channels and 32 digital I/O channels.

The decision to use the PowerPC based MIP405 over an x86 based board was based solely on the low power consumption of the board combined with the feature set. The choice was limited to x86, PowerPC, and ARM processor architectures because of a program decision to use the Linux operating system. The MIP405 integrates Ethernet, serial ports, and Disk-on-Chip interface on a single board while providing 128 MB of ECC memory and a powerful processor for under 2 watts. The closest x86 based system with comparable features found consumed 5 watts of power.

The M-Systems Disk-on-Chip was chosen because it was the de facto standard flash memory harddisk replacement. Flash memory was chosen over a traditional hard disk to increase reliability and reduce power. The 384 MB version was chosen to provide the storage required for the operating system and still maintain adequate margin.

The Diamond Systems Emerald-MM-8 was chosen for the asynchronous serial board based on its innate flexibility with any of the 8 ports capable of being configured as RS-232, RS-422, RS-485.

RMV's IO485 data acquisition and control board was chosen for the distributed telemetry system because of built-in support for daisy chaining and handling a large number of boards. The integrated expandability is fundamental to addressing future telemetry issues in later versions of the MidSTAR line.

The C&DH uses the Linux operating system with a 2.4 series kernel. To create an open software architecture the IP protocol stack was chosen to provide inter process, intra-satellite, and satellite-ground communications. This allowed programs created at different facilities on different hardware to be integrated with minimum difficulty.

All internal and external communications use internet protocols. TCP is used for all internal satellite communications; UDP or MDP is used on the uplink and downlink.

== See also ==
- USNA MidSTAR Program
- eoPortal describes MidSTAR-1
