= W. K. Hastings =

Canadian statistician

- Born: July 21, 1930; Toronto, Ontario, Canada
- Died: May 13, 2016 (aged 85); Victoria, British Columbia, Canada)
- Education: University of Toronto
- Known for: Metropolis–Hastings algorithm
- Scientific career
- Fields: Statistics
- Workplaces: University of Canterbury; Bell Labs; University of Toronto; University of Victoria
- Thesis: Invariant Fiducial Distributions (1962)
- Doctoral advisors: Donald A. S. Fraser; Geoffrey Watson
- Doctoral students: Peter Peskun

Wilfred Keith Hastings (July 21, 1930 – May 13, 2016) was a Canadian statistician. He was noted for his contribution to the Metropolis–Hastings algorithm (or, Hastings–Metropolis algorithm), the most commonly used Markov chain Monte Carlo method (MCMC).

== Early life and education ==
He received his B.A. in applied mathematics from the University of Toronto in 1953, and then worked from 1955 to 1959 for the Toronto company H.S. Gellman & Co.

Hastings received his M.A. in 1958, and his Ph.D. in 1962, both from the University of Toronto's department of mathematics (which included statistics at that time). His Ph.D. thesis title was "Invariant Fiducial Distributions". His Ph.D. supervisor was initially Don Fraser and later Geoffrey Watson.

== Work ==
After completing his Ph.D., Hastings worked briefly at the University of Canterbury in New Zealand (1962–64), and at Bell Labs in New Jersey (1964–66). From 1966 to 1971, Hastings was an associate professor in the department of mathematics at the University of Toronto. During this period, he wrote his famous paper on Markov chain Monte Carlo sampling.

While at the University of Toronto, Hastings also supervised his one Ph.D. student, Peter Peskun (now at York University), whose 1970 dissertation "The Choice Of Transition Matrix In Monte Carlo Sampling Methods Using Markov Chains" developed the Peskun ordering on Markov chain kernels.

In 1971, Hastings joined the department of mathematics at the University of Victoria (in British Columbia, on the west coast of Canada) as an associate professor, and was granted tenure there in 1974. He taught at Victoria for 21 years, usually teaching six one-semester courses per year. He did not supervise any more Ph.D. students, but he did supervise two M.Sc. students, and serve on the committees of four Ph.D. and two M.Sc. students. He held NSERC research grants from 1969 to 1980.

Hastings retired from the University of Victoria in 1992.
