= Geoffrey Watson =

Australian statistician (1921–1998)

Geoffrey S. Watson
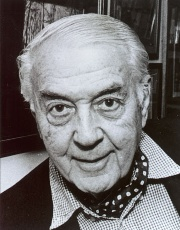
- Born: 3 December 1921; Bendigo, Victoria
- Died: 3 January 1998 (aged 76); Philadelphia, Pennsylvania
- Education: North Carolina State University
- Scientific career
- Fields: Statistics
- Workplaces: Princeton University
- Doctoral advisor: Richard Loree Anderson
- Doctoral students: Noel Cressie; Glenn Shafer; W. K. Hastings

Geoffrey Stuart Watson (3 December 1921 – 3 January 1998) was an Australian statistician.

Watson was born in Bendigo, Victoria in 1921. He studied at the University of Melbourne, and received his PhD at the North Carolina State University in 1951. After taking positions at the University of Melbourne, the Australian National University, the University of Toronto and Johns Hopkins University, he became chair of the Department of Statistics of Princeton University in 1970. He remained there until his death.

Watson developed the Durbin–Watson statistic for detecting autocorrelation with James Durbin of the London School of Economics in 1950. Watson was especially interested in applications of statistics. He used statistical methods to support the theory of continental drift. He estimated the size of the penguin population in Antarctica, and the effect of repealing the motorcycle helmet law in the United States.

In 1966, he was elected as a Fellow of the American Statistical Association.

He is sometimes confused with the mathematician G. L. Watson, who worked on quadratic forms, and G. N. Watson, a mathematical analyst.
