= Gelman-Rubin statistic =

Statement about the convergence of Monte Carlo simulations

The Gelman-Rubin statistic allows a statement about the convergence of Monte Carlo simulations.

== Definition ==
Monte Carlo simulations (chains) are started with different initial values. The samples from the respective burn-in phases are discarded. From the samples $x_{1}^{(j)},\dots, x_{L}^{(j)}$ (of the j-th simulation), the variance between the chains and the variance in the chains is estimated:

$\overline{x}_j=\frac{1}{L}\sum_{i=1}^L x_i^{(j)}$ Mean value of chain j
$\overline{x}_*=\frac{1}{J}\sum_{j=1}^J \overline{x}_j$ Mean of the means of all chains
$B=\frac{L}{J-1}\sum_{j=1}^J (\overline{x}_j-\overline{x}_*)^2$ Variance of the means of the chains
$W=\frac{1}{J} \sum_{j=1}^J \left(\frac{1}{L-1} \sum_{i=1}^L (x^{(j)}_i-\overline{x}_j)^2\right)$ Averaged variances of the individual chains across all chains

An estimate of the Gelman-Rubin statistic $R$ then results as

$$R=\frac{\frac{L-1}{L}W+\frac{1}{L}B}{W}$$.

When L tends to infinity and B tends to zero, R tends to 1.

A different formula is given by Vats & Knudson.

== Alternatives ==
The Geweke Diagnostic compares whether the mean of the first x percent of a chain and the mean of the last y percent of a chain match.

== Literature ==
- Vats, Dootika; Knudson, Christina (2021). "Revisiting the Gelman–Rubin Diagnostic". Statistical Science. 36 (4). arXiv:1812.09384. doi:10.1214/20-STS812.
- Gelman, Andrew; Rubin, Donald B. (1992). "Inference from Iterative Simulation Using Multiple Sequences". Statistical Science. 7 (4): 457–472. Bibcode:1992StaSc...7..457G. doi:10.1214/ss/1177011136. JSTOR 2246093.
