= Coupling from the past =

Method of sampling from a Markov chain

Among Markov chain Monte Carlo (MCMC) algorithms, coupling from the past is a method for sampling from the stationary distribution of a Markov chain. Contrary to many MCMC algorithms, coupling from the past gives in principle a perfect sample from the stationary distribution. It was invented by James Propp and David Wilson in 1996.

== The basic idea ==
Consider a finite state irreducible aperiodic Markov chain $M$ with state space $S$ and (unique) stationary distribution $\pi$ ($\pi$ is a probability vector). Suppose that we come up with a probability distribution $\mu$ on the set of maps $f:S\to S$ with the property that for every fixed $s\in S$, its image $f(s)$ is distributed according to the transition probability of $M$ from state $s$. An example of such a probability distribution is the one where $f(s)$ is independent from $f(s')$ whenever $s\ne s'$, but it is often worthwhile to consider other distributions. Now let $f_j$ for $j\in\mathbb Z$ be independent samples from $\mu$.

Suppose that $x$ is chosen randomly according to $\pi$ and is independent from the sequence $f_j$. (We do not worry for now where this $x$ is coming from.) Then $f_{-1}(x)$ is also distributed according to $\pi$, because $\pi$ is $M$-stationary and our assumption on the law of $f$. Define

$$F_j:= f_{-1}\circ f_{-2}\circ\cdots\circ f_{-j}.$$

Then it follows by induction that $F_j(x)$ is also distributed according to $\pi$ for every $j\in\mathbb{N}$. However, it may happen that for some $n\in\mathbb{N}$ the image of the map $F_n$ is a single element of $S$. In other words, $F_n(x)=F_n(y)$ for each $y\in S$. Therefore, we do not need to have access to $x$ in order to compute $F_n(x)$. The algorithm then involves finding some $n\in \mathbb N$ such that $F_n(S)$ is a singleton, and outputting the element of that singleton. The design of a good distribution $\mu$ for which the task of finding such an $n$ and computing $F_n$ is not too costly is not always obvious, but has been accomplished successfully in several important instances.

== The monotone case ==
There is a special class of Markov chains in which there are particularly good choices for $\mu$ and a tool for determining if $|F_n(S)|=1$. (Here $|\cdot|$ denotes cardinality.) Suppose that $S$ is a partially ordered set with order $\le$, which has a unique minimal element $s_0$ and a unique maximal element $s_1$; that is, every $s\in S$ satisfies $s_0\le s\le s_1$. Also, suppose that $\mu$ may be chosen to be supported on the set of monotone maps $f:S\to S$. Then it is easy to see that $|F_n(S)|=1$ if and only if $F_n(s_0)=F_n(s_1)$, since $F_n$ is monotone. Thus, checking this becomes rather easy. The algorithm can proceed by choosing $n:=n_0$ for some constant $n_0$, sampling the maps $f_{-1},\dots,f_{-n}$, and outputting $F_n(s_0)$ if $F_n(s_0)=F_n(s_1)$. If $F_n(s_0)\ne F_n(s_1)$ the algorithm proceeds by doubling $n$ and repeating as necessary until an output is obtained. (But the algorithm does not resample the maps $f_{-j}$ which were already sampled; it uses the previously sampled maps when needed.)

By defining a partial order with unique maximal and minimal elements on the state space and constructing order-preserving transition rules, monotone coupling from the past (CFTP) enables exact sampling across several domains:

- Statistical mechanics and spin systems: Monotone CFTP is widely applied to the ferromagnetic Ising model, the random-cluster model (Fortuin–Kasteleyn model), the Widom–Rowlinson model, and the hard-core model on bipartite graphs.
- Combinatorics and discrete structures: Algorithms have been developed for uniform random generation of domino tilings (dimer models), alternating sign matrices, two-rowed contingency tables and linear extensions of partially ordered sets.
- Queueing theory, stochastic networks, and probability distributions: Monotone CFTP samplers have been established for closed Jackson networks (both single-server and multi-server models), logarithmically separable concave distributions (such as the discretized Dirichlet distribution), and nonlinear autoregressive processes with monotone link functions.

By introducing an appropriate partial order structure on the target state space, monotone CFTP facilitates exact simulation across a wide range of probabilistic models, spanning statistical physics, discrete structure generation, and stochastic network theory.
