= CFESat =

Research satellite launched in 2007

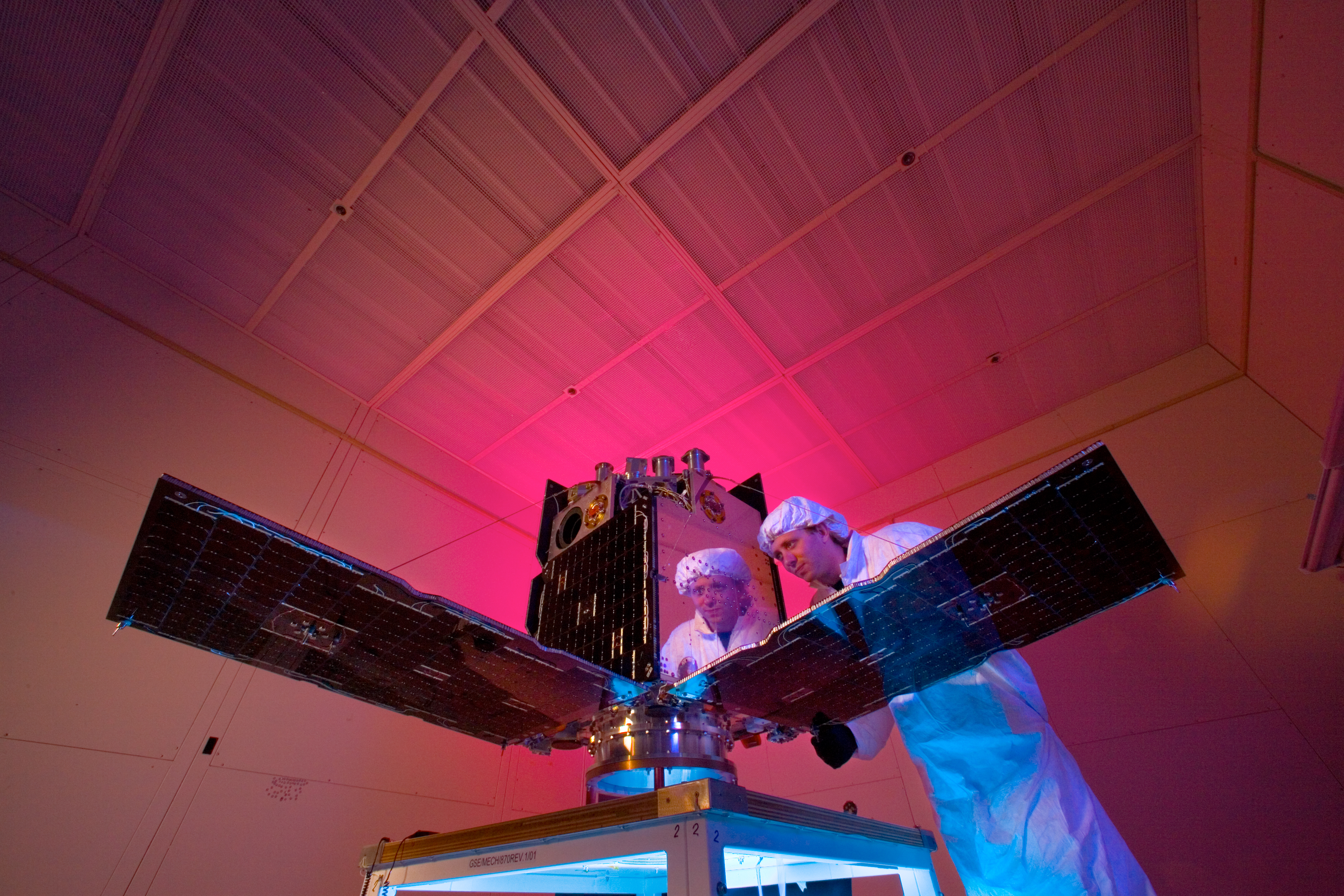
CFESat undergoing inspections at Los Alamos National Laboratory

CFESat (Cibola Flight Experiment Satellite) was a satellite that examined radio spectra for ionospheric and lightning studies, using field-programmable gate arrays (FPGAs). As well as science observation, the mission aimed to demonstrate the use of reconfigurable FPGAs to work in the radiation environment of low Earth orbit.

The eight satellite payloads were built by Los Alamos National Laboratory, and the bus was built by Surrey Satellite Technology Ltd. CFESat was the fourth experimental satellite project conducted between the National Nuclear Security Administration and NA-22 (the United States Department of Energy's Office of Research and Development), following up on previous space validation experiments performed on the ALEXIS and FORTE satellites.

CFESat was launched on an Atlas V rocket from Cape Canaveral on 8 March 2007, alongside Orbital Express, MidSTAR-1 and FalconSAT-3.

CFESat reentered the atmosphere on 12 November 2022, after fifteen years in orbit.
