= Small Satellite Program (United States Naval Academy) =

The United States Naval Academy (USNA) Small Satellite Program (SSP) was founded in 1999 to actively pursue flight opportunities for miniature satellites designed, constructed, tested, and commanded or controlled by Midshipmen. The Naval Academy's aerospace laboratory facilities are some of the most advanced and extensive in the country. These facilities include structures labs, propulsion and rotor labs, simulation labs, wind tunnels with flow velocities ranging from subsonic to supersonic, computer labs, and the Satellite Ground Station. The SSP provides funds for component purchase and construction, travel in support of testing and integration, coordination with The US Department of Defense or National Aeronautics and Space Administration (NASA) laboratories or with universities for collaborative projects, and guides Midshipmen through the Department of Defense (DoD) Space Experiments Review Board (SERB) flight selection process.

The satellite development process is a multi-semester effort requiring the contributions of Midshipmen from two distinct groups: 1) Senior Capstone Design Team involving several consecutive graduating classes and 2) Extra Curricular Activity open to all four classes and any majors program. In the senior capstone class, First Class Midshipmen studying aerospace engineering/astronautical track, take a Spacecraft Design and initiate the satellite building process in the fall semester with the identification of the mission and determination of requirements followed by development of the conceptual design. In the spring semester the graduating midshipmen will conduct assembly, testing, and final preparations of the satellite for launch. An extra curricular group consisting of all classes and open to all majors also contribute to SSP and is designed to further develop midshipmen interaction with space rated projects. The group often aids and assists the senior capstone team, however they design, build, construct and test their own platforms.

The scope of the projects supported by SSP is limited by the resources of the USNA Department of Aerospace Engineering. The Midshipmen participating in SSP-sponsored projects are predominantly drawn from First Class (senior) majors in aerospace engineering who have chosen to concentrate on astronautics.

== List of Satellites ==
List of USNA Satellites
Satellite	USNA Designator	Launch Date	De-Orbit Date	Status
Sapphire	USNA-0	2001		
PCSat	USNA-1	2001		*ACTIVE
PCSat-2 (ISS)	USNA-2	July 2005		
PCSat-3 (ISS)	USNA-3	July 2005		
ANDE	USNA-4			
MidSTAR	USNA-5	March 2007		
RAFT/MARScom	USNA-6			
PSAT	USNA-7	May 2015		*ACTIVE
DRAGONsat	USNA-8			
MidSTAR II	USNA-9	Cancelled		
USS Langley	USNA-10	May 2015		Non-responsive
BRICSat	USNA-11	May 2015		*ACTIVE
QIKCOM-1 (hosted)	USNA-12	Sep 2015		Waiting Deployment
QIKCOM-2 (hosted)	USNA-13	Late 2016		Manifested
BRICSat-2	USNA-14	Sep 2017		Manifested
PSAT-2	USNA-15	Sep 2017		Manifested
HFSat	USNA-16			Under Construction
NSat	USNA-17			Under Construction
TUGSat	USNA-18			Under Construction
RSat	USNA-19			Under Construction

== PCSat ==
PCsat, or Prototype Communication Satellite, was the United States Naval Academy's first space operating system. Launched in 2001 from Kodiak, Alaska, PCSat provided 2-way hand held communications for students and APRS travelers within the Amateur Satellite Service. PCSat remains the oldest surviving midshipmen built satellite in space. See http://aprs.org/pcsat.html

=== PCSat-2 & PCSat-3 ===
Both subsequent PCSats were repetitive designs from the first successful PCSat. These two satellites were launched to the ISS on 26 July 2005 and activated 8 days later in an external "suitcase" installed by an astronaut during a spacewalk. It was opened to expose the solar cells and to activate the data transponder. In addition to supporting the communications experiments, PCSat-2/3 also provided telemetry, command and control, and a NRL solar cell experiment (http://aprs.org/pcsat2.html).

== Sapphire ==
In 2001 Naval Academy midshipmen paired with students from Stanford University and George Washington University to launch and operate a second satellite dubbed Sapphire. Sapphire was initially equipped with a camera, voice synthesizer, and an infrared Earth Sensor and later was modified to also support the APRS network in support of PCSat. Sapphire was also launched in 2001 on Kodiak Star, out of Kodiak, Alaska.

== ANDE ==
The Atmospheric Neutral Density Experiment (ANDE) was another PCSat follow-on payload that flew inside a Navy Research Lab sphere launched to study the density of the atmosphere. ANDE had no solar panels, instead ANDE used 112 "D" sized Lithium cells. No external antennas were installed either. Each of the two halves of the sphere was insulated and used as a dipole antenna (http://aprs.org/ande.html).

== RAFT/MARScom ==
RAFT/MARScom was a USNA's 6th built satellite and was a combination of two small 5 inch cube shaped satellites. The Radar Fence Transponder (RAFT) was cube one and used to explore the Navy's Space Surveillance System. The second cube dubbed MarsCom contained a transponder which also continued to support follow-on PCSat transponder type communications and voice synthesizer (DoD Volunteer Emergency Communicators) (http://aprs.org/raft.html).

== MIDSTAR ==
MIDSTAR was the largest USNA satellite and was composed of several minor payloads for the Space Test Program that operated in S-Band. The satellite was only capable of communicating with the USNA Ground Station. MIDSTAR II was a follow-up to the first; however, it never flew.

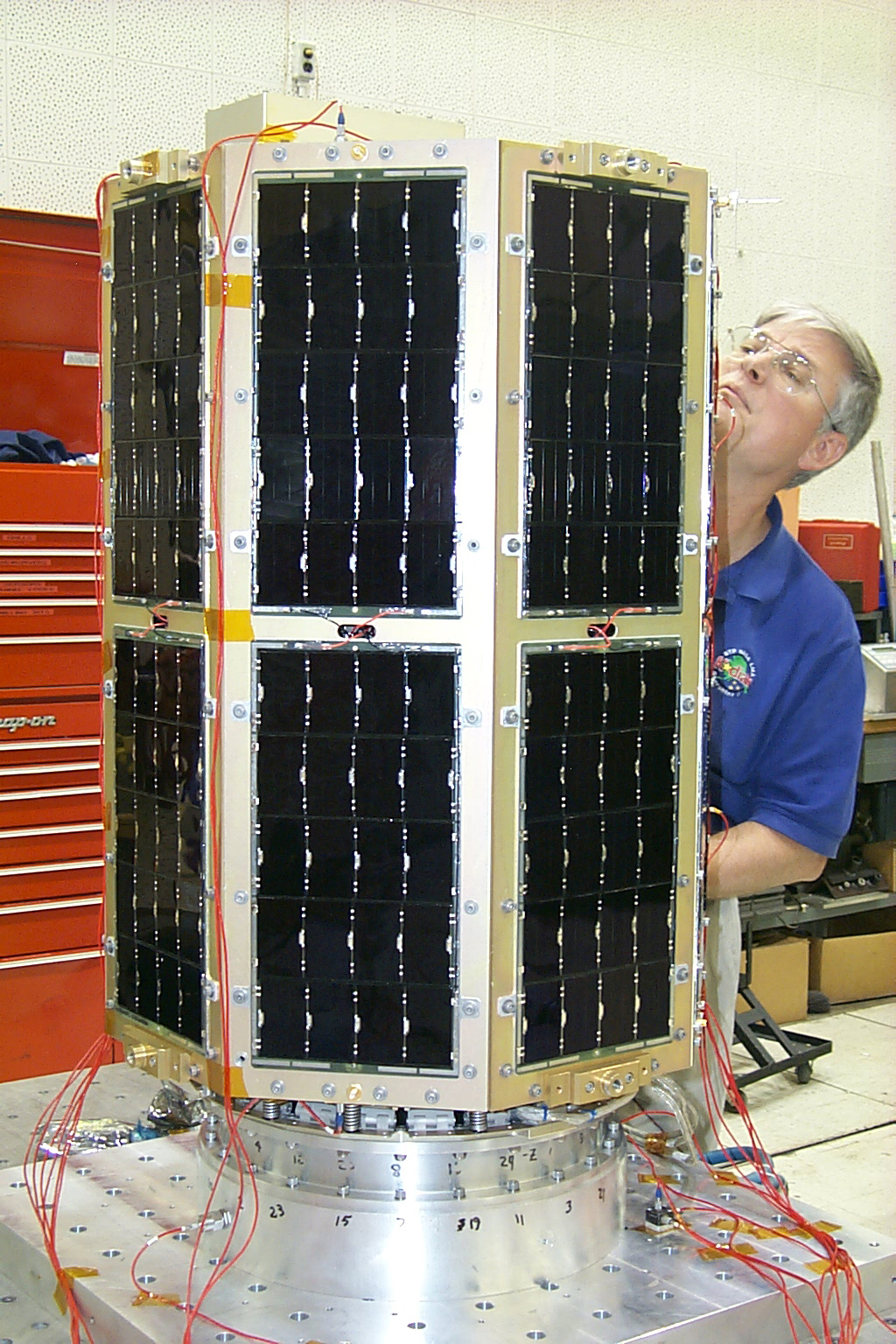
MIDSTAR-1 after vibration testing.

== DRAGONSat ==
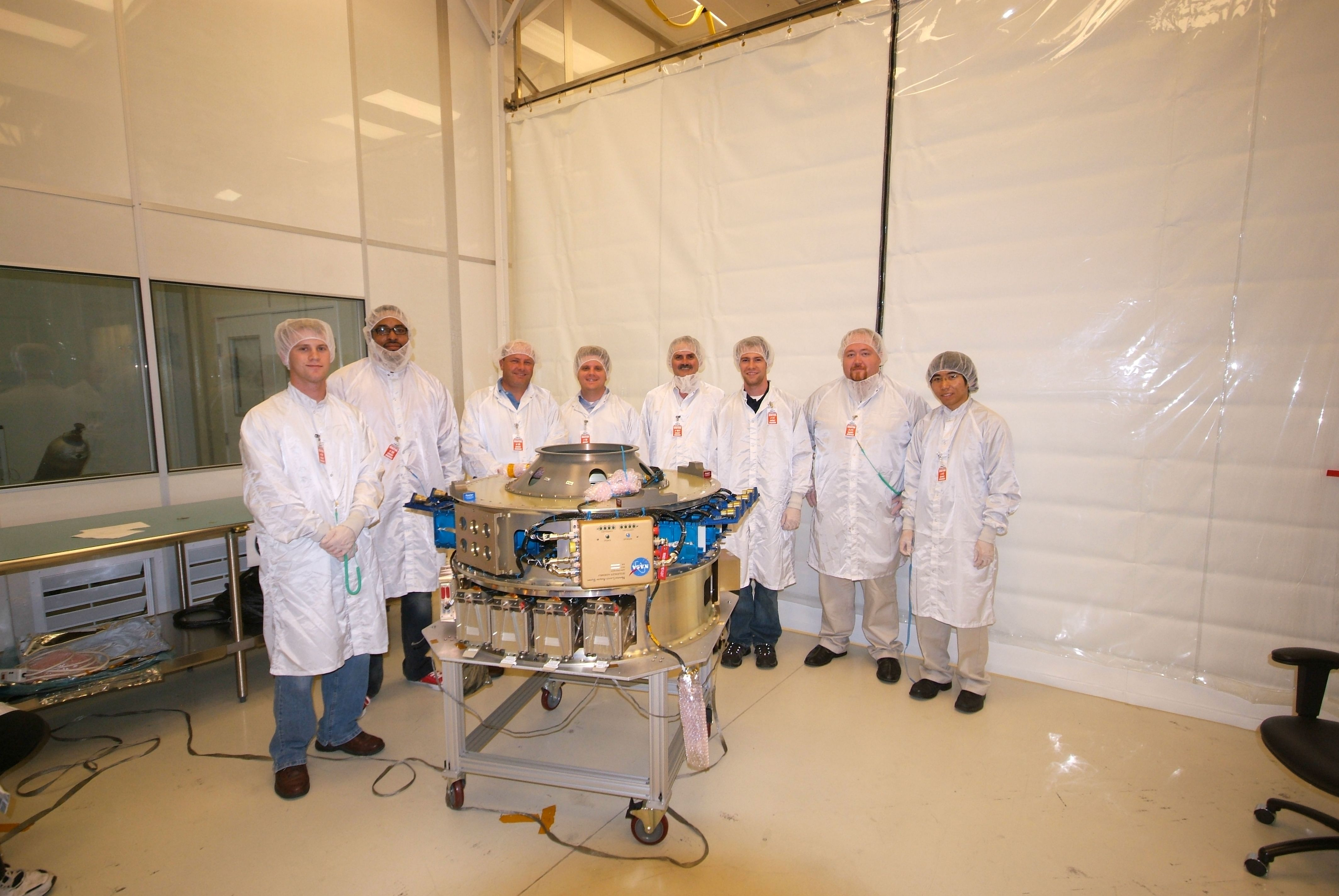
DRAGONSat integrated into flight payload. USNA Midshipmen who built the satellite are behind the payload.

DRAGONSat was the first 1U Cubesat built by midshipmen. The primary payload was a gravity-gradient boom that extended a tip mass 1.5 meters from the satellite.

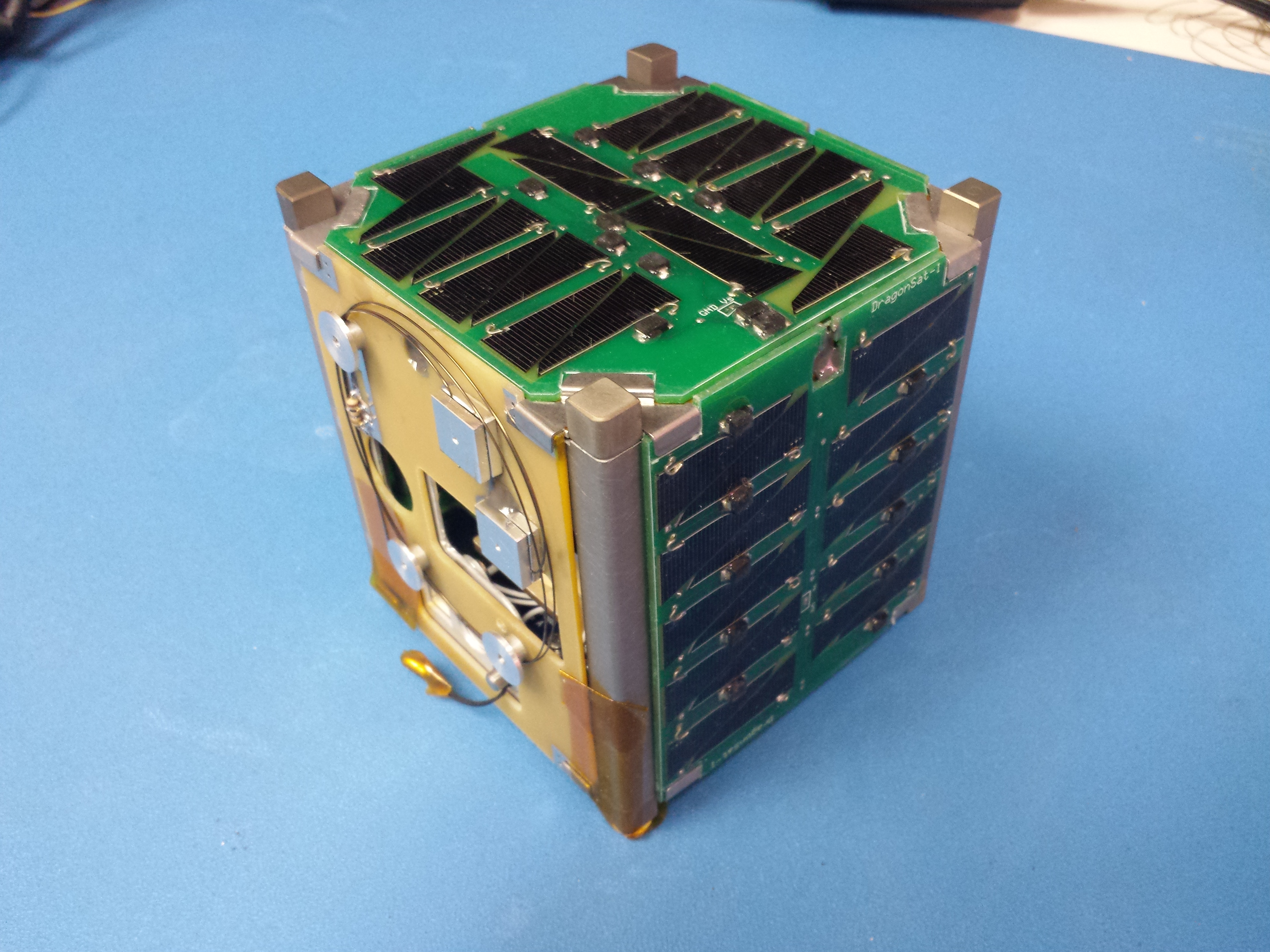
DRAGONSat before payload integration. The opening for the extending boom can be seen on the left side of the satellite.

== USS Langley ==
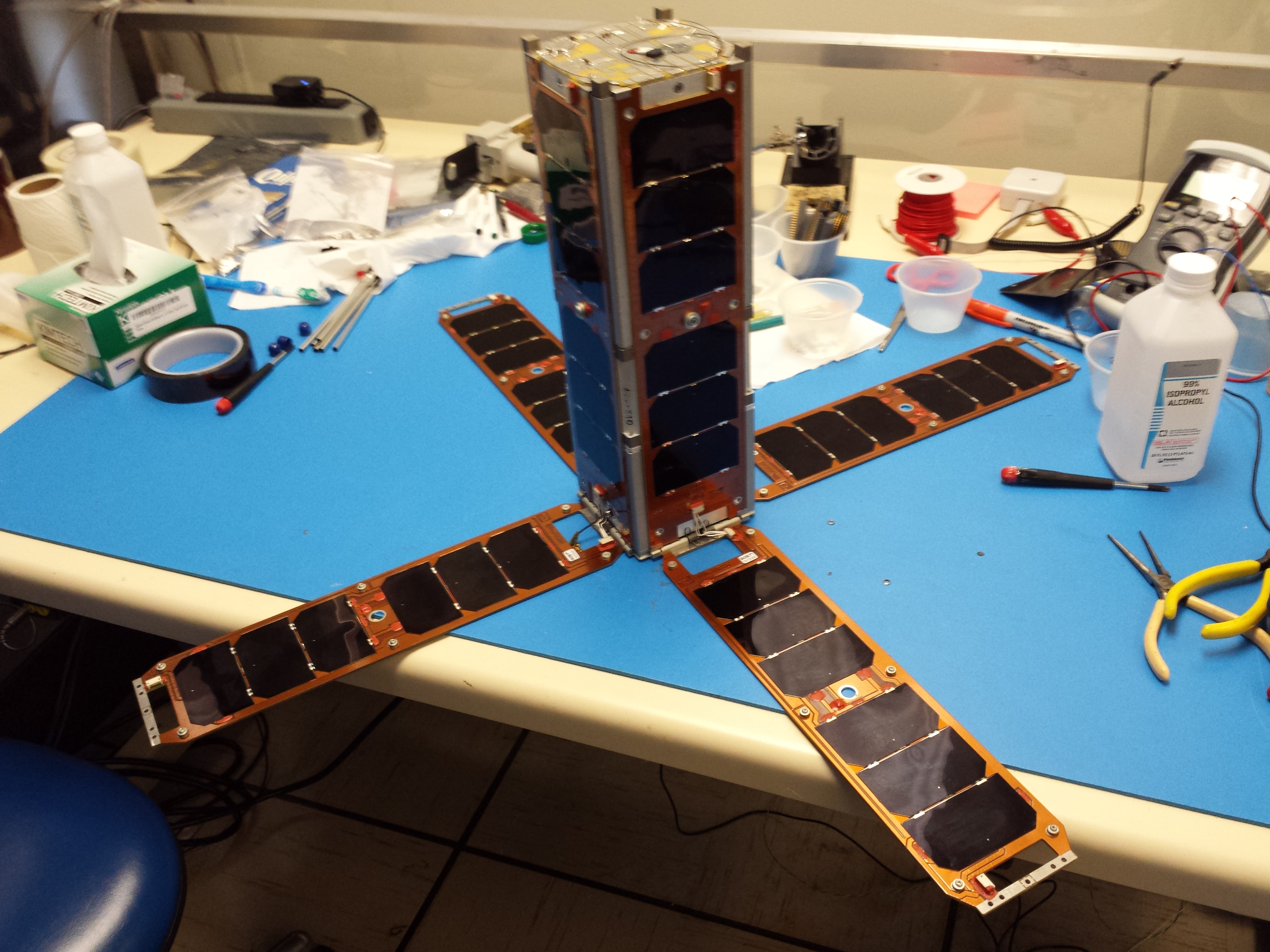
USS Langley after vibe table testing with fully deployed solar panels.

This 3U Colony-1 Cubesat was designed to provide a Linux-based file server in space operating on S-Band. It launched on the ULTRA mission in spring 2015. Communications were never established with the satellite.

== BRICSat ==
=== BRICSat-1 ===
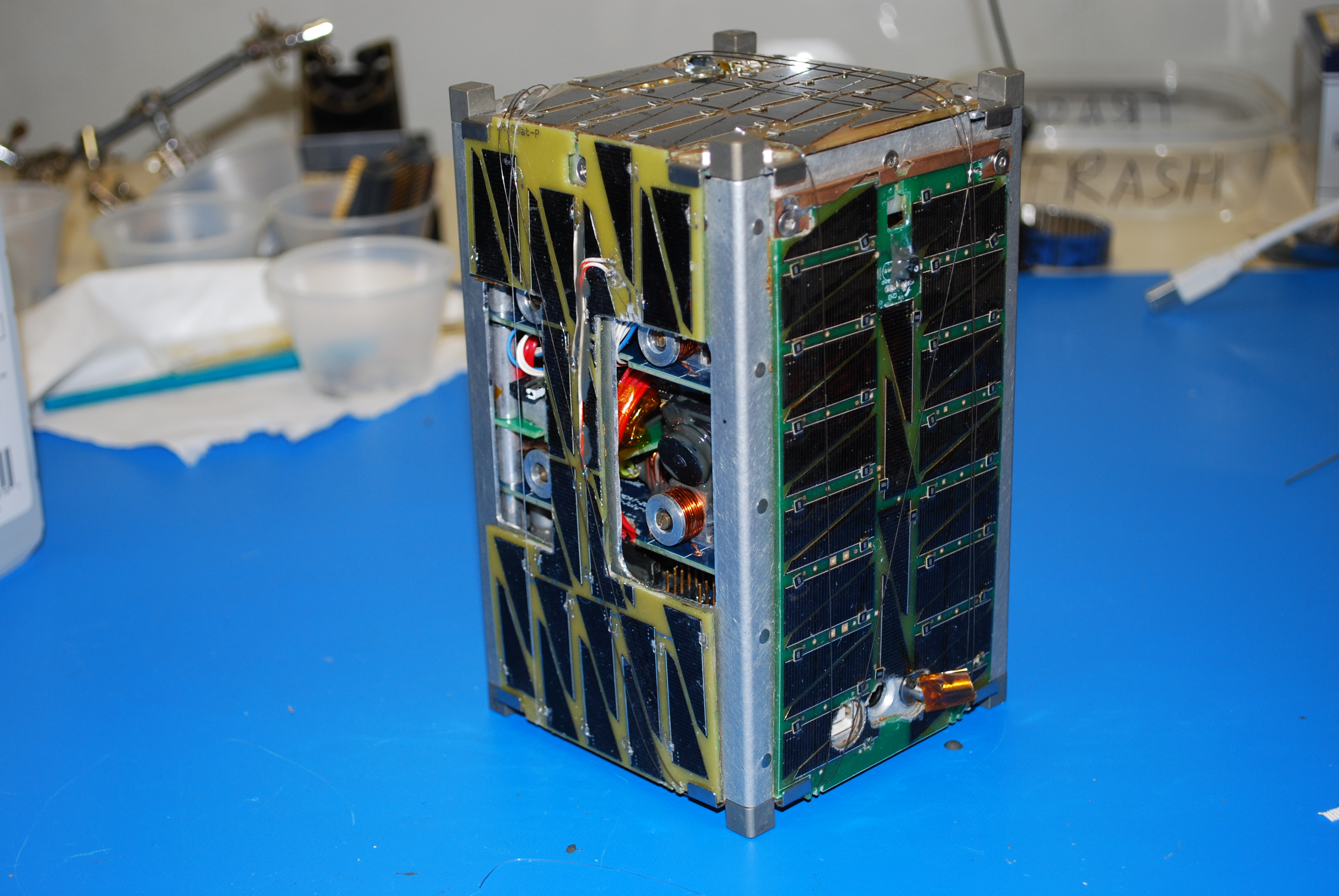
BRICSat-1 before flight integration.

BRICSat-1 is a 1.5 U Cubesat with a primary payload of micro-arch thrusters built by George Washington University to experiment with attitude control. It was launched on the ULTRA mission in the spring of 2015 and is still active. BRICSat-1 also continues support of the Amateur radio operators via a PSK-31 multi-user text messaging transponder similar to PSAT, an updated version of PCSAT. The thruster experiment was a success; however, communication issues prevent the retrieval of the data from the satellite. See http://aprs.org/bricsat-1.html

=== BRICSat-2 ===
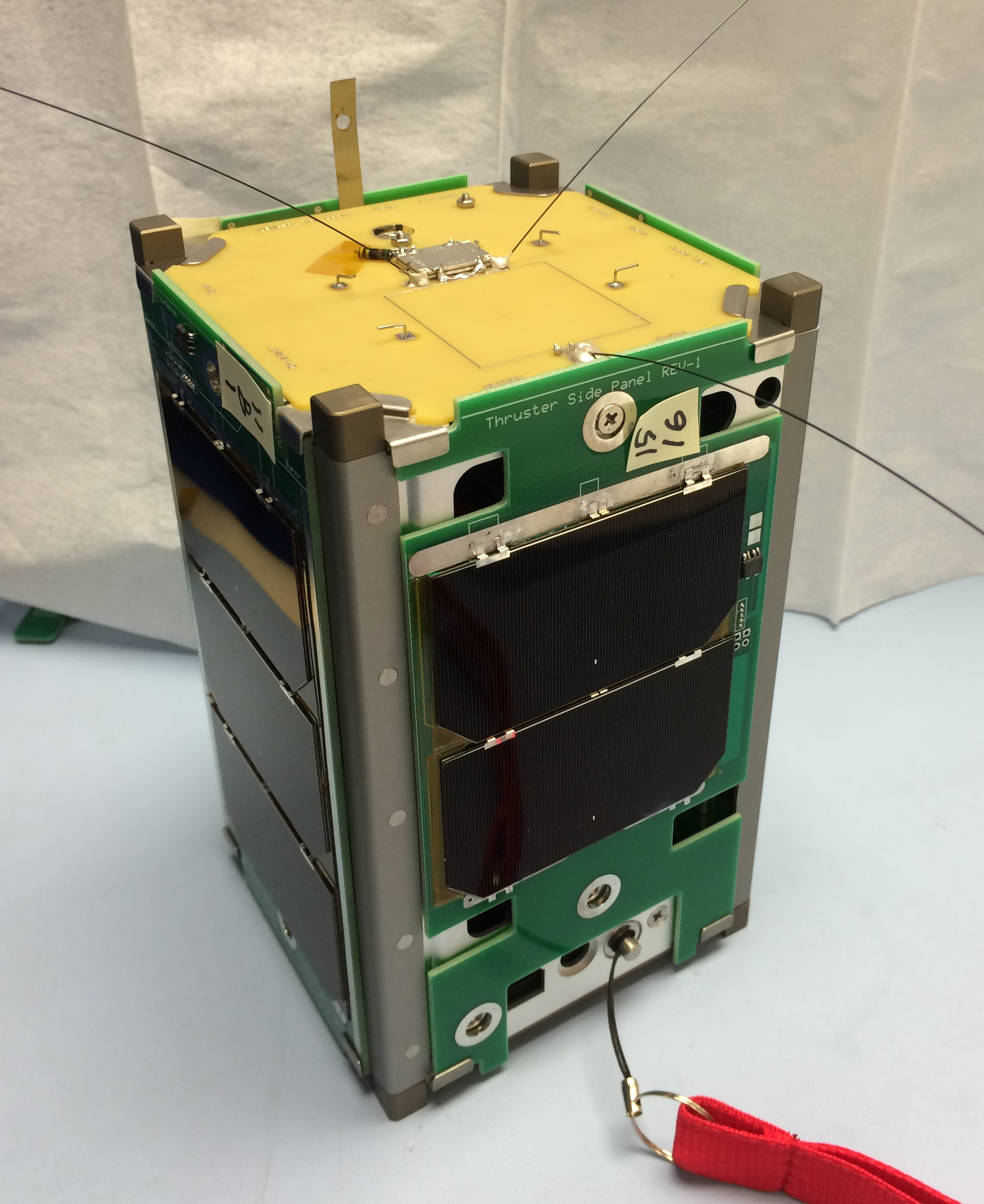
BRICSat-2 after initial assembly. Thruster openings can be seen as little holes on the front of the satellite.

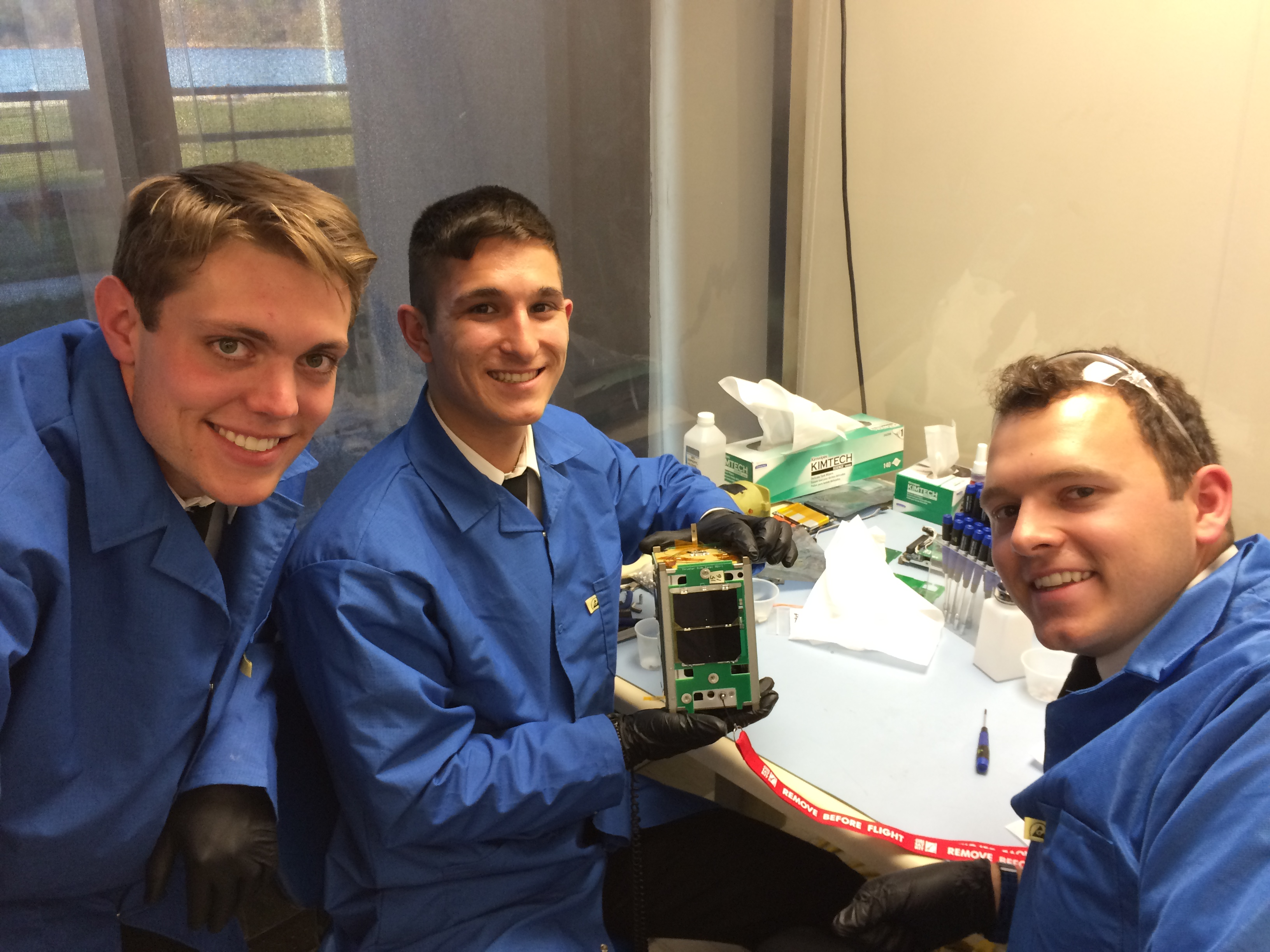
BRICSat-2 assembly. L to R Midshipmen Eilinger, Furseth, and Cumberland.

Manifest on the STP-2 launch of SpaceX heavy lift vehicle in September 2017, this 1.5U CubeSat continues flight testing of the George Washington University thrusters. BRICSat-2 will conduct similar tests as BRICSat-1 but with the redesigned radio also being flown on PSAT-2. See http://aprs.org/bricsat-2.html

== PSAT ==
=== PSAT-1 ===
PSAT or ParkinsonSat is the upgraded version of PCSat and operates using the APRS network. PSAT also houses a PSK-31 transponder. Launched with BRICSat and USS Langley on 20 May 2015, PSAT-1 has had non mission critical failures, and continues to operate today. See http://aprs.org/psat.html

=== PSAT-2 ===
Manifest on the STP-2 launch of SpaceX heavy lift vehicle in September 2017, this communications satellite has integrated all of the APRS command and control as well as APRS user transponder onto a single circuit card as the baseline of future USNA CubeSat missions. It combines all of the APRS data relay network pioneered by USNA since PCSat in 2001 and includes the PSK-31 and TouchTone Texting experiments of QIKCOM-2 all into a single satellite. See http://aprs.org/psat-2.html

== QIKCOM ==
=== QIKCOM-1 ===
QIKCom-1 is an amateur radio payload built to take advantage of the previously developed APRS network. Because it flies on a host spacecraft (SIMPL), there were no solar panels or attitude control systems developed (as in previous designs). It continues the PCSat and PSAT missions containing APRS packet radio communications transponders for relaying remote telemetry, sensor and user data from remote users and amateur radio environmental experiments. The data transponder also includes all the telemetry and command and control for a complete CubeSat.

QUICOM-1 has arrived on the ISS and is awaiting deployment. Currently SIMPL / QIKCOM-1 is being held from release due to a SNAFU over radio licensing. Once released, the expected lifetime is very short, lasting for only a couple weeks. See http://aprs.org/qikcom-1.html

=== QIKCOM-2 ===
QIKCOM-2 is another USNA built payload flying on the eXCITe mission scheduled for launch in late 2016. The payload continues the APRS missions of prior USNA space systems, but also adds a simpler touch-tone up-link capability so that users worldwide can use existing radios with key pads instead of the more expensive specialized APRS radios from past satellites. QIKCOM-2 allows position reporting and text messaging from anywhere on earth using simple $90 radios. Delivered in November 2015 to the spacecraft integrator, QIKCOM-2 is being held as a hot-backup and will be launched at the earliest opportunity. See http://aprs.org/qikcom-2.html

== HFSat ==
HFSat is designed to be a HF SATCOM (High Frequency Satellite Communications) experiment to demonstrate the use of HF radios for simple backup HF SATCOM. The concept would allows every unit from the largest Naval warships to a single Marine infantryman to be equipped with HF radios to access SATCOM without needing special radios. The detailed designed began late summer of 2016 and initial tests will use HF Satellite allocations in the Amateur Satellite services as well as amateur experiments worldwide.

== NSAT ==
NSAT is a planned 1.5U CubeSat designed to house two experiments and will be the first USNA Satellite to use DoD Command and Control system licensed via NTIA. The first of the payloads will test the use of simplified encryption techniques in the space environment. The second experiment will fly an experimental distributed power system for NASA.

== TUGSat ==
TUGSat is a planned 3U CubeSat with electric propulsion (similar to BRICSat) specifically designed for attitude control and maneuvering capability. It will be designed to work with follow on RSAT modules with docking capabilities.

== RSat-P ==
RSat-P, or Repair Satellite Prototype, is a 3U CubeSat and the first USNA robotics mission that launched on 16 December 2018. RSat-P features two robotic arms for robotic investigations and manipulations in the space environment. Future RSat models will be attached to a TUGSAT which will provide the needed maneuvering capabilities.
