= Marshall Rosenbluth =

American physicist (1927–2003)

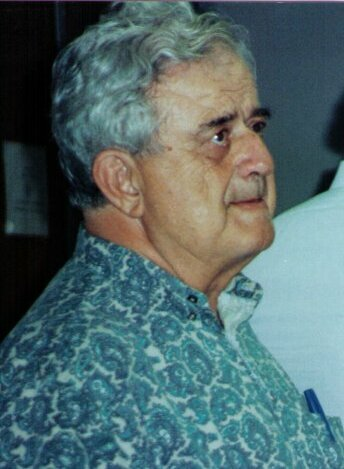
- Rosenbluth in 1994
- Born: February 5, 1927; Albany, New York, US
- Died: September 28, 2003 (aged 76); San Diego, California, US
- Education: Harvard University (BS); University of Chicago (PhD)
- Known for: Plasma Physics; Rosenbluth potentials Metropolis algorithm Rosenbluth formula
- Spouse(s): Arianna Rosenbluth; Sara Rosenbluth
- Awards: E.O. Lawrence Prize (1964); Albert Einstein Award (1967); James Clerk Maxwell Prize for Plasma Physics (1976); Enrico Fermi Award (1985); Hannes Alfvén Prize (2002)
- Scientific career
- Fields: Physics
- Workplaces: General Atomics; UC San Diego; Princeton University; University of Texas at Austin
- Doctoral advisor: Edward Teller
- Doctoral students: Michael E. Glinsky

Marshall Nicholas Rosenbluth (5 February 1927 – 28 September 2003) was an American plasma physicist and member of the National Academy of Sciences, and member of the American Philosophical Society. In 1997 he was awarded the National Medal of Science for discoveries in controlled thermonuclear fusion, contributions to plasma physics, and work in computational statistical mechanics. He was also a recipient of the E.O. Lawrence Prize (1964), the Albert Einstein Award (1967), the James Clerk Maxwell Prize for Plasma Physics (1976), the Enrico Fermi Award (1985), and the Hannes Alfvén Prize (2002).

== Early life and education ==
Rosenbluth was born into a Jewish family and graduated from Stuyvesant High School in 1942. He did his undergraduate study at Harvard, graduating in 1946 (B.S., Phi Beta Kappa), while also serving in the U.S. Navy (1944–46). He received his Ph.D. in 1949 from the University of Chicago.

== Career ==
During his first post-doctoral position at Stanford University (1949–1950), he derived the Rosenbluth formula, which was the basis of the analysis used by Robert Hofstadter in his Nobel prize-winning experimental investigation of electron scattering. Hofstadter refers to this in his 1961 Nobel Lecture: "This behavior can be understood in terms of the theoretical scattering law developed by M. Rosenbluth in 1950".

In 1950 his doctoral advisor Edward Teller, who is considered the father of the hydrogen bomb, recruited Rosenbluth to work at Los Alamos. Rosenbluth maintained this position until 1956. The research he conducted at Los Alamos led to the development of the H-bomb.

... Rosenbluth went to the South Pacific to prepare for the first H-bomb test. He had trouble sleeping, and was pondering the bomb design when he realised the scientists had made a calculating error that could result in a dud. The flaw was remedied by modifying the detonator, and the bomb vaporised a mile-wide island with a power 700 times greater than that of the atom bomb dropped on Hiroshima in 1945.

In 1953, Rosenbluth derived the Metropolis algorithm, based on generating a Markov chain which sampled fluid configurations according to the Boltzmann distribution. This algorithm was first presented in the paper "Equation of State Calculations by Fast Computing Machines", coauthored with his wife Arianna Rosenbluth (who wrote the first computer program to implement the method), Nicholas Metropolis, Augusta H. Teller and Edward Teller. This now-famous paper was cited in Computing in Science and Engineering as being among the top 10 algorithms having the "greatest influence on the development and practice of science and engineering in the 20th century." He and Arianna subsequently introduced the configurational-bias Monte Carlo method for simulating polymers.

By the late 1950s, Rosenbluth turned his attention to the burgeoning discipline of plasma physics and quickly laid the foundation for many avenues of research in the field, particularly the theory of plasma instabilities. Although he continued to work on plasma physics for the remainder of his career, he often made forays into other fields. For example, around 1980, he and coworkers produced a detailed analysis of the free electron laser, indicating how its spectral intensity can be optimized.

In 1956, Rosenbluth left Los Alamos to join an atomic energy firm, General Atomics. In 1960, while still employed with General Atomics he joined the faculty of the University of California at San Diego. Later, he joined the Institute for Advanced Study in Princeton, New Jersey (1967). In 1980, he went to the University of Texas at Austin. He then went back to University of California at San Diego in 1987. In 1993, he retired from UCSD became the chief scientist of the central team for the International Tokamak Experimental Reactor, where he worked until 1999. He maintained a high productivity rate throughout his entire career. Indeed, only a few years before his death, Rosenbluth discovered the existence of residual flows (so-called Rosenbluth-Hinton flows), a key result for understanding turbulence in tokamaks.

== Additional information ==
Upon his retirement, he took on the responsibility of chief scientist of the Central Team for the International Thermonuclear Experimental Reactor (ITER) until 1999. Rosenbluth also served as a member of the JASON Defense Advisory Group.

Rosenbluth was affectionately known as the Pope of Plasma Physics in reference to his deep understanding of the field.

== Personal life ==
Arianna Rosenbluth was his first wife; they were married in 1951, while he was at Stanford. They had four children together. They later divorced; he married Sara Rosenbluth (formerly Sara Unger), an artist and educator in 1980, and they were together until his death.
