= Equation of State Calculations by Fast Computing Machines =

1953 scientific article

"Equation of State Calculations by Fast Computing Machines" is a scholarly article published by Nicholas Metropolis, Arianna W. Rosenbluth, Marshall N. Rosenbluth, Augusta H. Teller, and Edward Teller in the Journal of Chemical Physics in 1953. This paper proposed what became known as the Metropolis Monte Carlo algorithm, later generalized as the Metropolis–Hastings algorithm, which forms the basis for Monte Carlo statistical mechanics simulations of atomic and molecular systems.

== Development ==
Some controversy exists with regard to credit for development of the algorithm. Prior to 2003, there was no detailed account of the algorithm's development. Then, shortly before his death, Marshall Rosenbluth attended a 2003 conference at LANL marking the 50th anniversary of the 1953 publication. At this conference, Rosenbluth described the algorithm and its development in a presentation titled "Genesis of the Monte Carlo Algorithm for Statistical Mechanics". Further historical clarification is made by Gubernatis in a 2005 journal article recounting the 50th anniversary conference. Rosenbluth makes it clear that he and his wife Arianna did the work, and that Metropolis played no role in the development other than providing computer time. Rosenbluth credits Teller with a crucial but early suggestion to "take advantage of statistical mechanics and take ensemble averages instead of following detailed kinematics". Additional clarification of attribution is given in connection with the Metropolis–Hastings algorithm. The Rosenbluths would subsequently publish two additional, lesser-known papers using the Monte Carlo method, while the other authors would not continue to work on the topic. Already in 1953, however, Marshall was recruited to work on Project Sherwood and thereafter turned his attention to plasma physics. Here he laid the foundation for much of modern plasma fluid and kinetic theory, and particularly the theory of plasma instabilities.

== Algorithm ==
Monte Carlo methods are a class of computational algorithms that rely on repeated random sampling to compute their results. In statistical mechanics applications prior to the introduction of the Metropolis algorithm, the method consisted of generating a large number of random configurations of the system, computing the properties of interest (such as energy or density) for each configuration, and then producing a weighted average where the weight of each configuration is its Boltzmann factor, exp(−E/kT), where E is the energy, T is the temperature, and k is the Boltzmann constant. The key contribution of the Metropolis paper was the idea that

Instead of choosing configurations randomly, then weighting them with exp(−E/kT), we choose configurations with a probability exp(−E/kT) and weight them evenly.

— Metropolis et al.,

Periodic boundary conditions. When the green particle moves through the top of the central sphere, it reenters through the bottom.

This change makes the sampling focus on the low-energy configurations, which contribute the most to the Boltzmann average, resulting in improved convergence. To choose configurations with a probability exp(−E/kT) that can be weighed evenly, the authors devised the following algorithm: 1) each configuration is generated by a random move on the previous configuration and the new energy is computed; 2) if the new energy is lower, the move is always accepted; otherwise the move is accepted with a probability of exp(−ΔE/kT). When a move is rejected, the last accepted configuration is counted again for the statistical averages and is used as a base for the next attempted move.

The main topic of the article was the numerical calculation of the equation of state for a system of rigid spheres in two dimensions. Subsequent work generalized the method to three dimensions and to fluids using the Lennard-Jones potential. The simulations were done for a system of 224 particles; each simulation consisted of up to 48 cycles, where each cycle consisted of moving each particle once and took about three minutes of computer time using the MANIAC computer at Los Alamos National Lab.

To minimize surface effects, the authors introduced the use of periodic boundary conditions. This means that the simulated system is treated as a unit cell in a lattice, and when a particle moves out of the cell, it automatically comes in through the other side (making the system a topological torus).

== Review and reception ==
According to a perspective published nearly fifty years later by William L. Jorgensen, "Metropolis et al. introduced the samplic method and periodic boundary conditions that remain at the heart of Monte Carlo statistical mechanics simulations of fluids. This was one of the major contributions to theoretical chemistry of the twentieth century." As of 2011, the article has been cited over 18,000 times.

In another perspective, it was said that although "the Metropolis algorithm began as a technique for attacking specific problems in numerical simulations of physical systems [...] later, the subject exploded as the scope of applications broadened in many surprising directions, including function minimization, computational geometry, and combinatorial counting. Today, topics related to the Metropolis algorithm constitute an entire field of computational science supported by a deep theory and having applications ranging from physical simulations to the foundations of computational complexity."

== See also ==
- Timeline of scientific computing
