= Albert Einstein Award =

Award in theoretical physics (1951–1979)

- Awarded for: outstanding achievement in the natural sciences
- Sponsored by: Lewis and Rosa Strauss Memorial Fund
- Country: United States
- Presented by: Institute for Advanced Study
- Reward: US$5,000
- First award: 1951

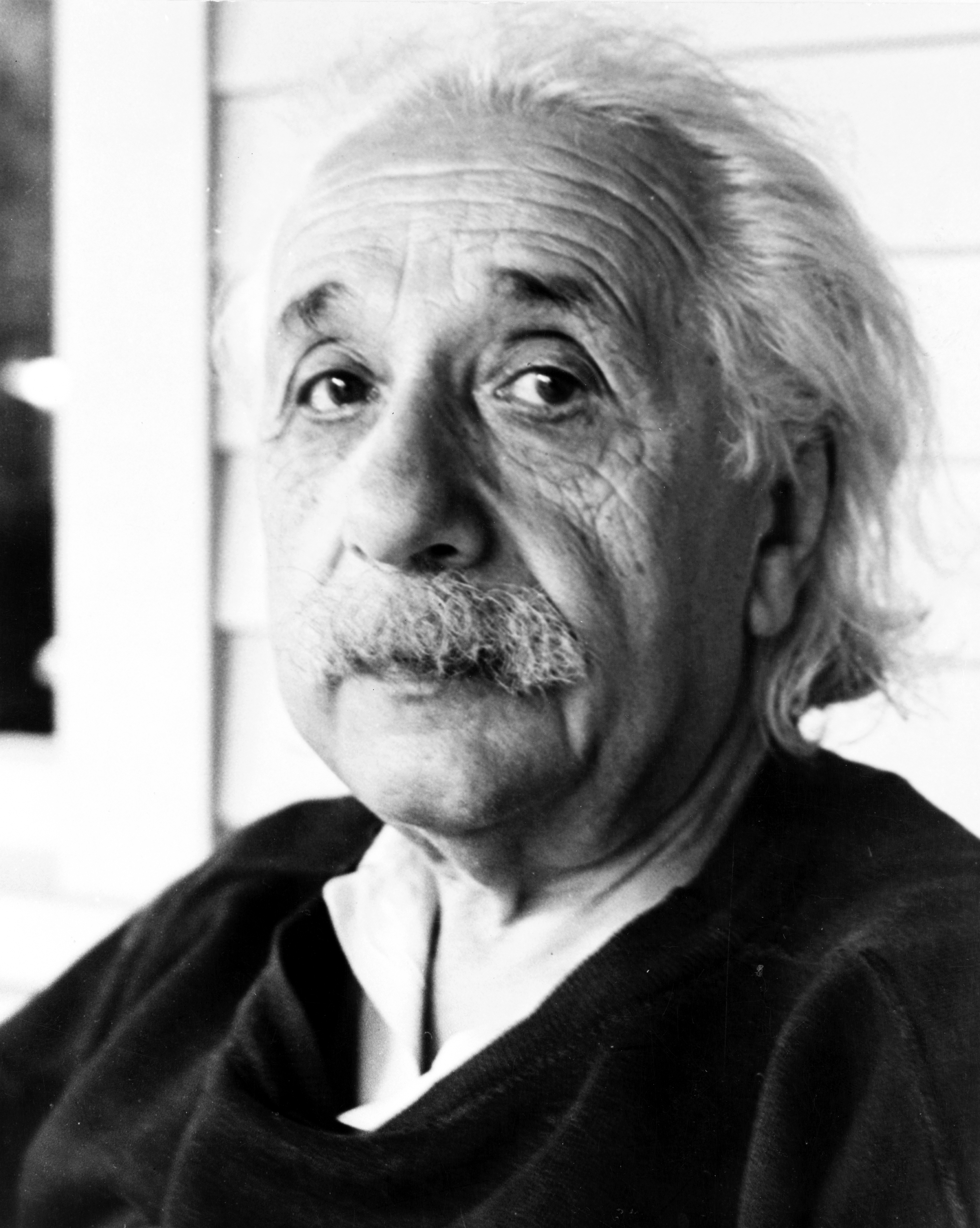
Albert Einstein in his later years.

The Albert Einstein Award (Note: The award was sometimes mistakenly called the Albert Einstein Medal because it was accompanied with a gold medal) was an award in theoretical physics, given periodically from 1951 to 1979, that was established to recognize high achievement in the natural sciences. It was endowed by the Lewis and Rosa Strauss Memorial Fund in honor of Albert Einstein's 70th birthday. It was first awarded in 1951 and, in addition to a gold medal of Einstein by sculptor Gilroy Roberts, it also included a prize money of $15,000, which was later reduced to $5,000. The winner was selected by a committee (the first of which consisted of Einstein, Oppenheimer, von Neumann, and Weyl) of the Institute for Advanced Study, which administered the award. Lewis L. Strauss used to be one of the trustees of the institute.

This award should not be confused with many others named after the famous physicist, such as the Albert Einstein World Award of Science given by the World Cultural Council (since 1984), the Albert Einstein Medal given by the Albert Einstein Society (since 1979), nor with the Hans Albert Einstein Award, named after his son and given by the American Society of Civil Engineers (since 1988). It was established much earlier than these, while Einstein was still alive and was a professor at the Institute for Advanced Study, and John Archibald Wheeler had considered it to be under copyright in 1970. Around the same time, it was described as "the highest of its kind in the United States" by The New York Times. Some considered it as "the prestigious equivalent of a Nobel Prize".

== Recipients ==
Albert Einstein Award recipients
Year	Image	Recipient(s)	Ref.
1951	Picture of Kurt Gödel circa 1926	Kurt Gödel	
1951	Picture of Julian Schwinger in 1965	Julian Schwinger	
1954	Picture of Richard Feynman	Richard Feynman	
1958	Picture of Edward Teller in 1958	Edward Teller	
1959	Picture of Willard Libby in 1974	Willard Libby	
1960	Picture of Leo Szilard circa 1960	Leó Szilárd	
1961	Picture of Luis Alvarez in April 1969	Luis Alvarez	
1965	Picture of John Archibald Wheeler in 1985	John Wheeler	
1967	Picture of Marshall Rosenbluth in 1994	Marshall Rosenbluth	
1970	Picture of Yuval Ne'eman in 1950	Yuval Ne'eman	
1972	Picture of Eugene Wigner in 1963	Eugene Wigner	
1978	Picture of Stephen Hawking circa 1980	Stephen Hawking	
1979		Tullio Regge	

== See also ==
- List of physics awards
- List of awards named after people
