= Oliver Haywood =

United States Air Force general (1911–2002)

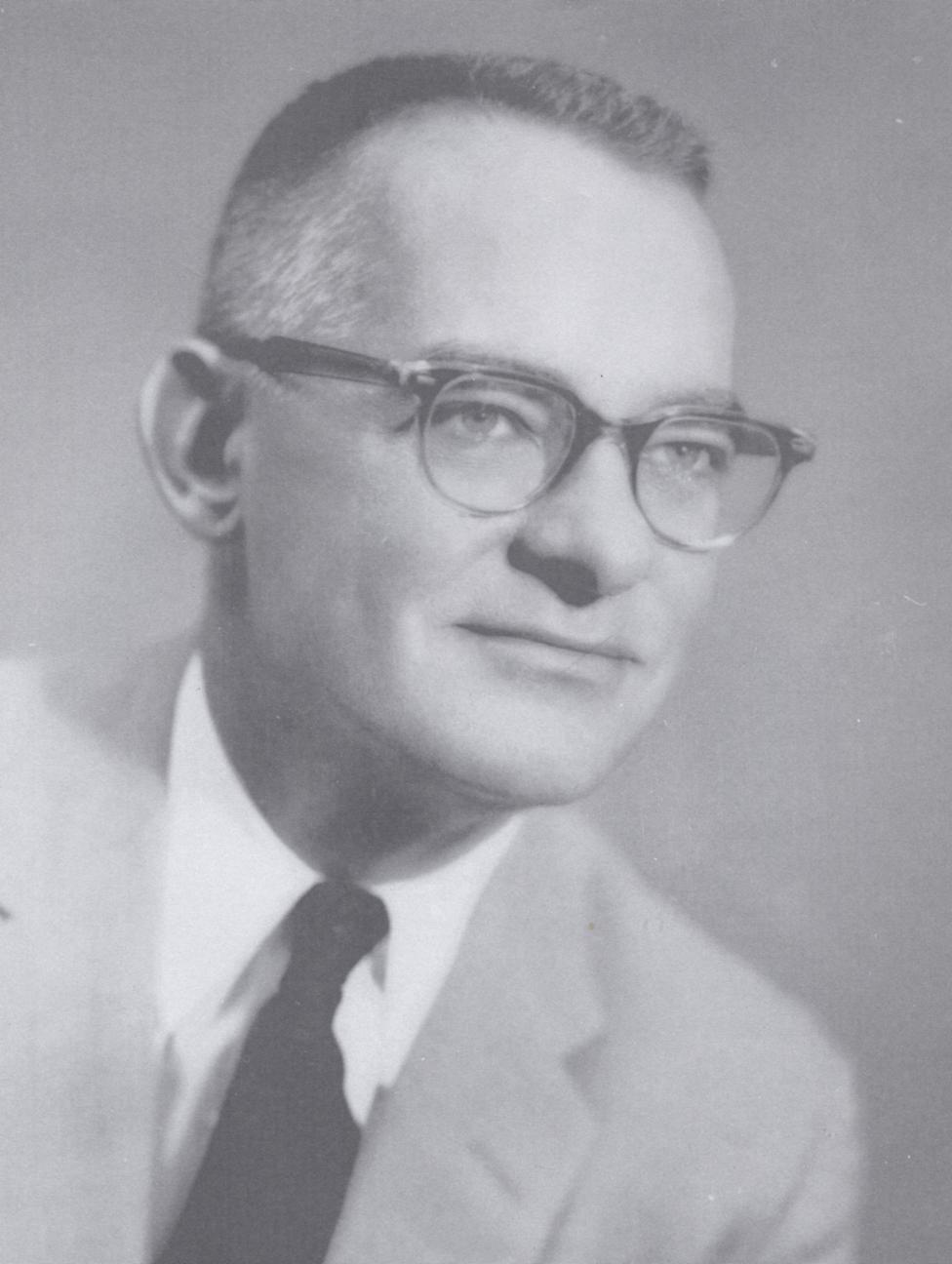
- Born: 29 November 1911; Highland Mills, New York
- Died: 25 May 2002 (aged 90); Vero Beach, Florida
- Military career
- Allegiance: United States of America
- Branch: United States Army (1936–1947); United States Air Force (1947–1967)
- Service years: 1936–1967
- Rank: Brigadier general
- Commands: 130th Engineer Battalion
- Conflicts: World War II
- Awards: Legion of Merit (2)
- Other work: President and CEO, Chairman of Huyck Corporation
- Scientific career
- Fields: Geology, Engineering
- Thesis: Flume experiments on the transportation by water of sands and light-weight materials (1940)

Oliver Garfield Haywood Jr., (29 November 1911 – 25 May 2002) was a United States Army officer during World War II who served with the Manhattan Project. He transferred to the United States Air Force in 1947. After retiring from active duty in 1953, he became president and chief executive officer, and later chairman, of Huyck Corporation.

== Early life and career ==
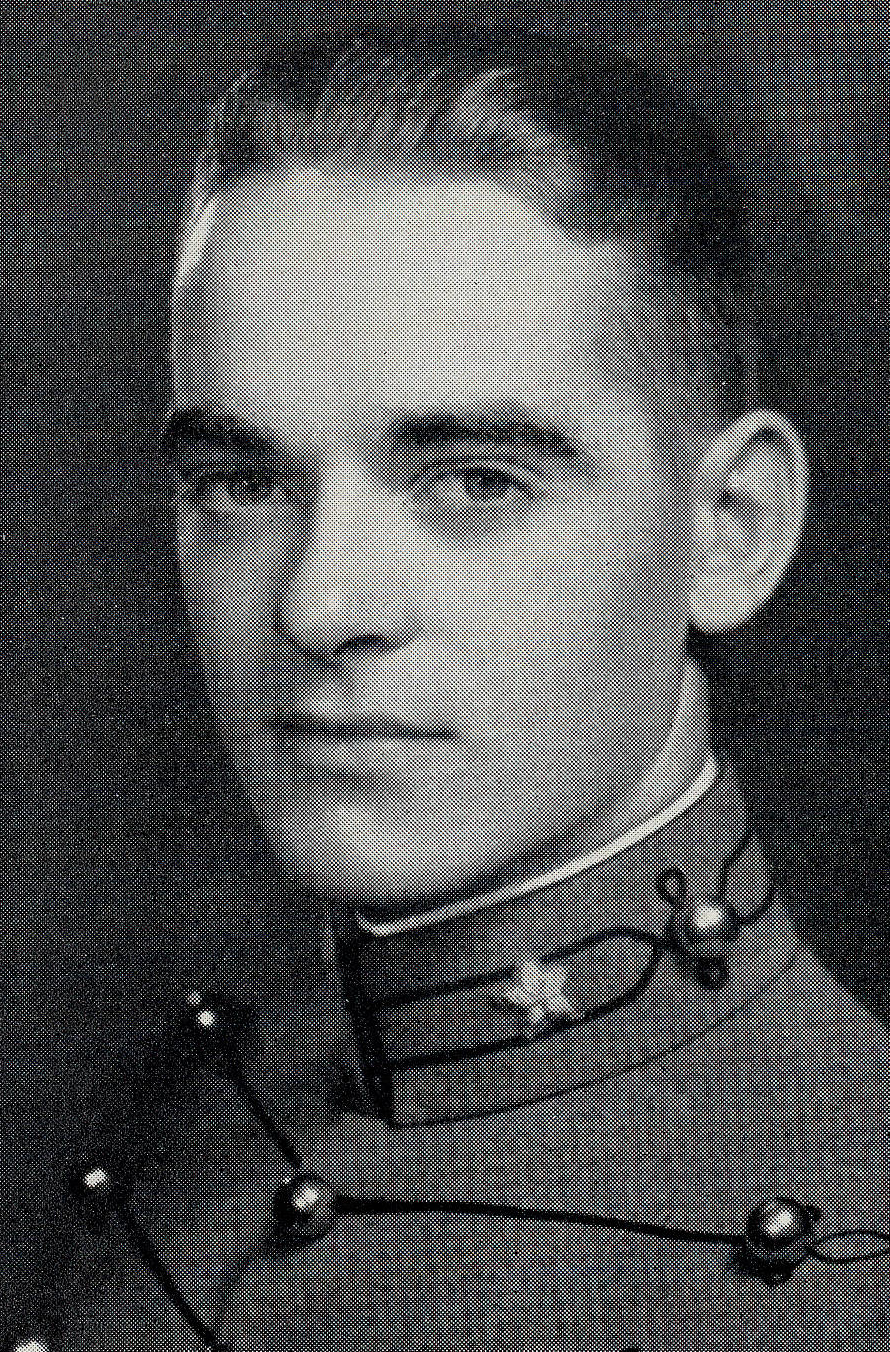
Haywood as a West Point cadet c. 1936

Oliver Garfield Haywood, Jr., was born in Highland Mills, New York on 29 November 1911. He entered the United States Military Academy at West Point on 1 July 1932, and graduated top of the class of 1936 on 12 June 1936. His class included Bruce Palmer, Jr., who graduated sixth. Haywood was commissioned as a second lieutenant in the United States Army Corps of Engineers, and was posted to Vicksburg, Mississippi, as executive officer of the Waterways Experiment Station. In June 1937, went to Conchas Dam in New Mexico as assistant to the District Engineer, Captain Hans Kramer. The dam was under construction at the time, and was a major undertaking.

On 25 September 1938, Haywood entered Massachusetts Institute of Technology (MIT) as a student officer. While there he was promoted to first lieutenant on 12 June 1939. On 25 September 1939, he also became a graduate student at Harvard University's Graduate School of Engineering. He received his Master of Science (MS) degree from Harvard on 20 June 1940, and his Doctor of Science (DSc) degree from MIT on 15 August. He was promoted to captain on 15 September.

== World War II ==
Haywood assumed command of Company C, 27th Engineer Battalion in Puerto Rico on 13 September 1940. He then commanded the 130th Engineer Battalion there from 16 April 1941 until 31 December 1941. On 1 January 1942, he became executive officer of the 78th Engineers there. He was promoted to major in the wartime Army of the United States on 1 February 1942. He attended the Command and General Staff College at Fort Leavenworth, Kansas, from November 1942 to February 1943, before returning to Puerto Rico for duty on the staff of the Antilles Department. He was promoted to lieutenant colonel on 14 February 1943.

In October 1943, Haywood was assigned to the G-1 (Personnel) Division of the War Department General Staff in Washington, D.C. For his services in this role, he was promoted to colonel on 28 September 1944, and was awarded the Legion of Merit. On 5 August 1945, he became Assistant Chief of Staff (G-1) at headquarters, European Theater of Operations (ETO). For his services during the demobilization, he was awarded a second Legion of Merit.

== After the war ==
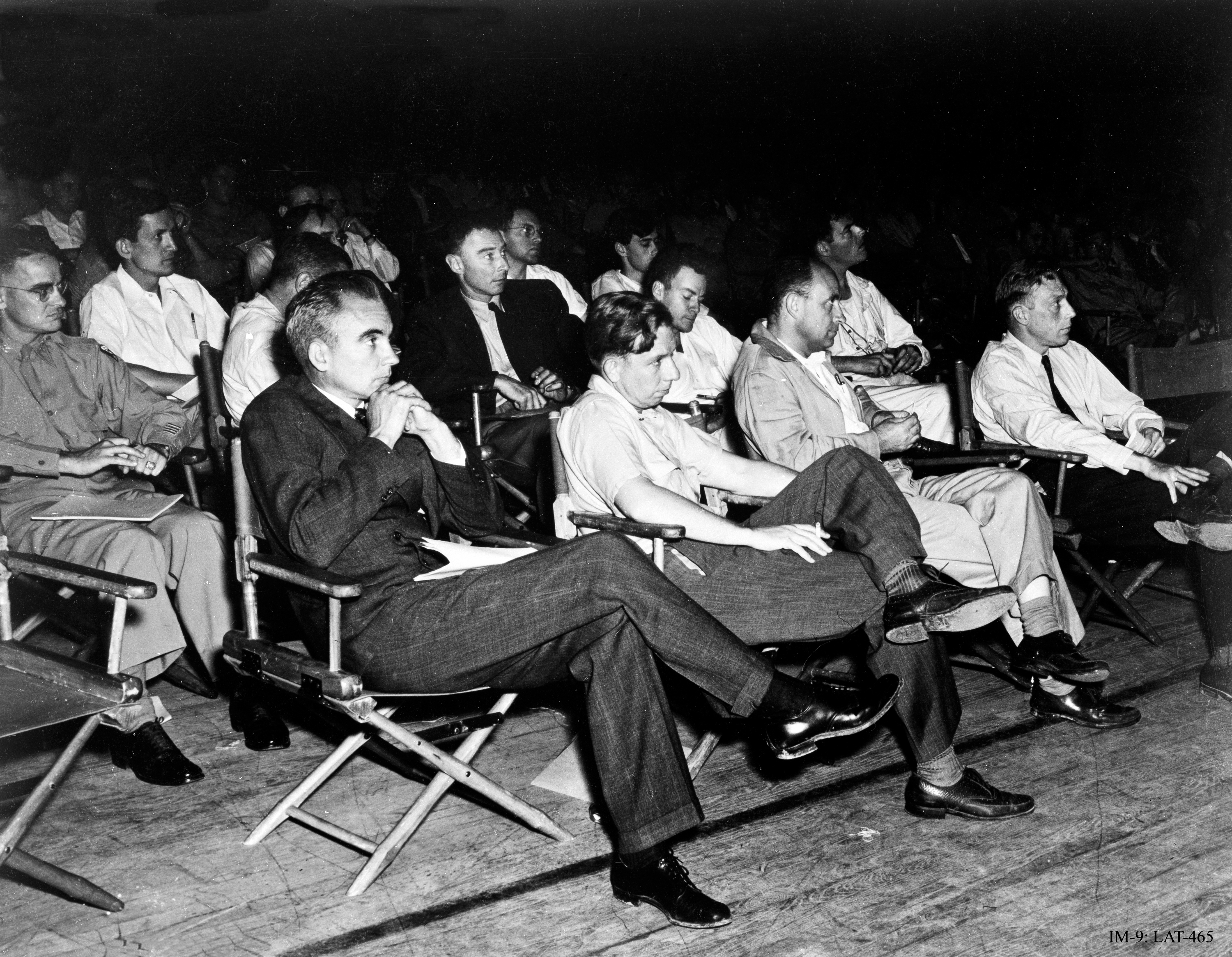
Haywood (left) at a 1946 Los Alamos colloquium on the Hydrogen bomb

Haywood was transferred to the headquarters of the Manhattan Project on 12 April 1946. He was one of a number West Point graduates from the top ten percent of their classes who were transferred to the Manhattan Project at this time by the Secretary of War, Robert P. Patterson, at the request of the Manhattan Project's commander, Major General Leslie R. Groves, Jr., and over the objection of senior Army leaders. Their job was to replace reservists who had worked for the Project during the war and now were eligible for separation from the Army. Haywood participated in Operation Crossroads, observing the nuclear tests at Bikini Atoll.

Groves hoped that a new, permanent agency would soon be created to take over the responsibilities of the wartime Manhattan Project, but passage of the Atomic Energy Act of 1946 through Congress took much longer than expected, and involved considerable debate about the proper role of the military with respect to the development, production and control of nuclear weapons. The act that was finally signed by President Harry S. Truman on 1 August 1946 created a civilian agency, the Atomic Energy Commission (AEC), to take over the functions and assets of the Manhattan Project, but the AEC did not assume its role until 1 January 1947. At this point, Haywood was seconded to the AEC's Directorate of Research.

Although he had been a colonel in the Army of the United States, Haywood only held the substantive rank of captain in the Army Corps of Engineers. His Army of the United States rank was terminated on 30 June 1947, and he returned to duty with the War Department General Staff as a captain on 1 July 1947. Haywood elected to transfer to the newly created United States Air Force on 10 December 1947. He became a lieutenant colonel on 1 July 1948, and was assigned to the Air Plans Division on 29 August 1948, where he was involved in drawing up nuclear war plans. From July 1949 to May 1950 he attended the Air War College at Maxwell Air Force Base, Alabama.

Haywood was seconded to the Los Alamos National Laboratory in New Mexico from February 1950 to October 1951, at a time when the first thermonuclear weapons were being developed. Edward Teller once remarked that "Colonel Haywood is the only military man I would work for." Haywood then served at the chief of the Air Force Office of Scientific Research, and was vice commander of the Atlantic Missile Range until his retirement from active duty in 1953. He remained with the Air Force Reserve, retiring with the rank of brigadier general in 1967.

== Later life ==
After leaving the Air Force, Haywood became the President and chief executive officer, and later the chairman of the board of Huyck Corporation in Stamford, Connecticut. He was also chairman and acting president of the Hudson Institute in Indianapolis.

Haywood died in Vero Beach, Florida, on 25 May 2002. He was survived by his daughters, Barbara and Betty, and sons, Richard and Robert. His wife, Helen, had predeceased him.
