= Arianna W. Rosenbluth =

American physicist and computer scientist (1927-2020)

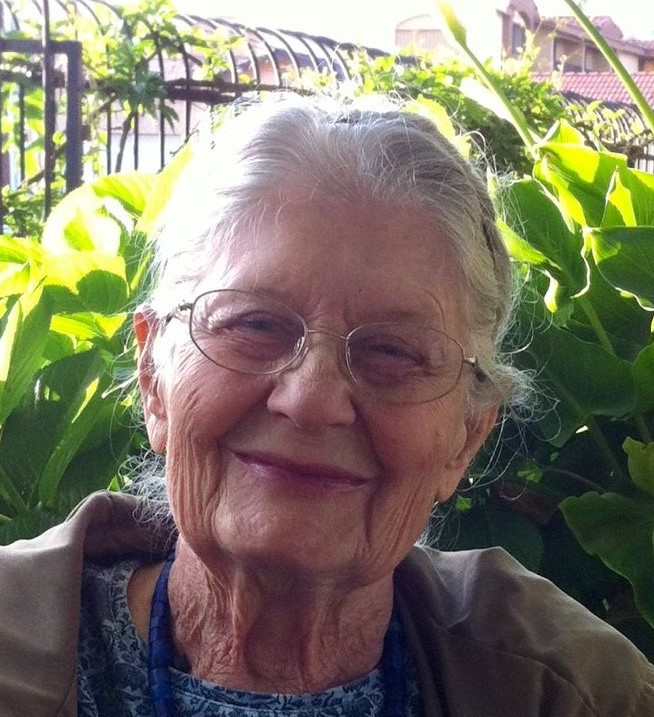
- Rosenbluth in 2013
- Born: Arianna Wright; September 15, 1927; Houston, Texas, U.S.
- Died: December 28, 2020 (aged 93); Pasadena, California, U.S.
- Education: Lamar High School, Houston
- Alma mater: Rice Institute; Radcliffe College; Harvard University
- Known for: Metropolis algorithm
- Spouse: Marshall Rosenbluth (m. 1951; div. 1978)
- Scientific career
- Fields: Physics, computer science
- Workplaces: Stanford University; Los Alamos National Laboratory
- Doctoral advisor: John Hasbrouck Van Vleck

Arianna Wright Rosenbluth (September 15, 1927 – December 28, 2020) was an American physicist who contributed to the development of the Metropolis–Hastings algorithm. She wrote the first full implementation of the Markov chain Monte Carlo method.

== Early life and education ==
Arianna Rosenbluth was born in Houston, Texas, on September 15, 1927. She attended university at the Rice Institute, now Rice University, where she received a Bachelor of Science in 1946. During her college days, she fenced competitively and won both the Texas women's championship in foil as well as the Houston men's championship. She qualified for the Olympics, but was unable to compete because the 1944 Summer Olympics were cancelled due to World War II and she could not afford to travel to the 1948 games in London.

Rosenbluth obtained her Master of Arts from Radcliffe College in 1947 before beginning her PhD in physics at Harvard University under the supervision of Nobel Laureate John Hasbrouck Van Vleck. At the time Van Vleck also supervised the future Nobel Laureate P.W. Anderson and the philosopher of science Thomas Kuhn. She completed her thesis, entitled Some Aspects of Paramagnetic Relaxation, in 1949 at the age of 22.

== Career ==
After completing her thesis Rosenbluth won an Atomic Energy Commission postdoctoral fellowship to Stanford University which she attended before moving to a staff position at Los Alamos National Laboratory where her research focused on atomic bomb development and statistical mechanics.

Along with Marshall Rosenbluth she verified analytic calculations for the Ivy Mike test using the SEAC at the National Bureau of Standards. Once the MANIAC I had been completed at Los Alamos she collaborated with Nicholas Metropolis, Marshall N. Rosenbluth, Augusta H. Teller, and Edward Teller to develop the first Markov chain Monte Carlo algorithm, in particular the prototypical Metropolis–Hastings algorithm, in the seminal paper Equation of State Calculations by Fast Computing Machines. In close collaboration with her husband Marshall, she developed the implementation of the algorithm for the MANIAC I hardware, making her the first person to ever implement the Markov chain Monte Carlo method.

Over the next few years Rosenbluth and Marshall applied the method to novel studies of statistical mechanical systems, including three-dimensional hard spheres and two-dimensional Lennard-Jones molecules and two and three-dimensional molecular chains.

After the birth of her first child, Rosenbluth left research to focus on raising her family.

== Personal life ==
While at Stanford University she met Marshall Rosenbluth and the two married on January 26, 1951. They had four children before divorcing in 1978. In 1956, she moved from Los Alamos to San Diego, California, where Marshall began to work at General Atomic. Eventually, she moved to Princeton, New Jersey, before finally settling in the greater Los Angeles area. She kept her married name after the divorce.

Rosenbluth died from complications of COVID-19 in the greater Los Angeles area on December 28, 2020, during the COVID-19 pandemic in California. She was 93.

She is survived by four children and many grandchildren and great-grand children. The family encourages donations to the ASPCA, which was said to be one of Rosenbluth's favourite charities.
