= Augusta H. Teller =

American scientist

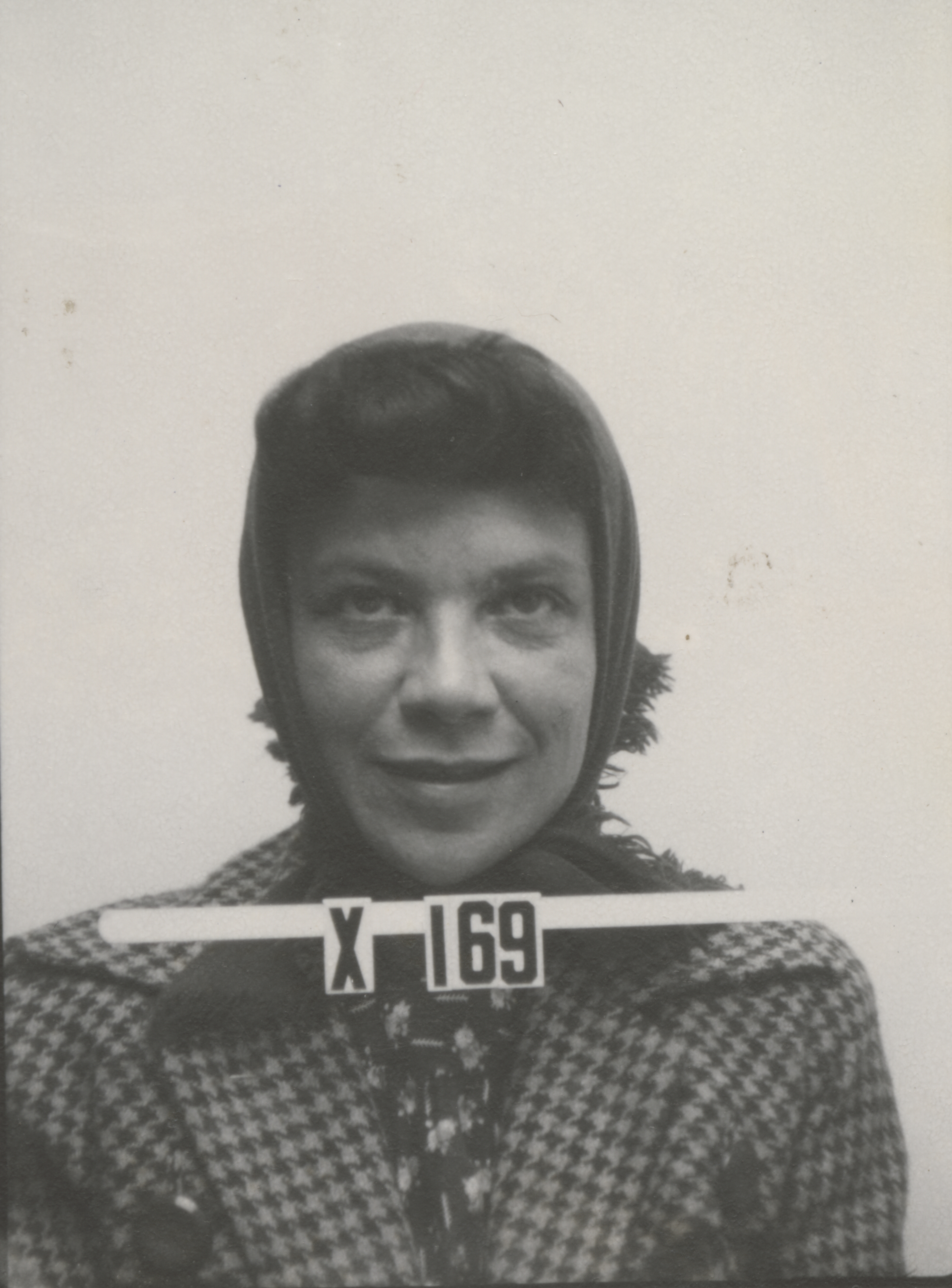
- Teller's Los Alamos wartime security badge
- Born: Auguszta Mária Harkányi; 30 April 1909; Hungary
- Died: 4 June 2000 (aged 91)
- Education: University of Budapest; University of Pittsburgh
- Known for: Metropolis algorithm
- Spouse: Edward Teller (m. 1934)
- Scientific career
- Fields: Physics

Augusta Maria "Mici" Teller (née Schütz-Harkányi; 30 April 1909 – 4 June 2000) was a Hungarian-American scientist and computer programmer, involved in the development of the Metropolis algorithm.

== Life and career ==
Teller was born as Auguszta Mária Harkányi in Hungary, the daughter of Ella/Gabriella (Weiser) and Ede Harkányi, originally Hirsch Sámuel. Her parents were Jewish, but had converted to Christianity. Known as "Mici," she and her brother, Ede, were adopted by their foster father after their biological father's death, who gave them their second last name.

In 1924, Ede "Szuki" Schütz-Harkányi introduced Mici to his childhood friend, Edward Teller, who would become her future husband and an important scientist for the Manhattan Project.

In 1931, Mici earned her teacher's diploma after studying mathematics at the University of Budapest.

During 1932–1933, Mici spent two years at the University of Pittsburgh with a scholarship to study sociology and psychology earning her master's degree in Personnel Work in 1933. When she returned to Hungary, she married her longtime friend, Teller, on February 24, 1934. The Tellers emigrated to the United States in 1935, after Russian-born physicist George Gamow invited Edward to teach at the George Washington University. She and her husband became American citizens on March 6, 1941. The Tellers had two children: Paul (b.1943) and Wendy (b.1946).

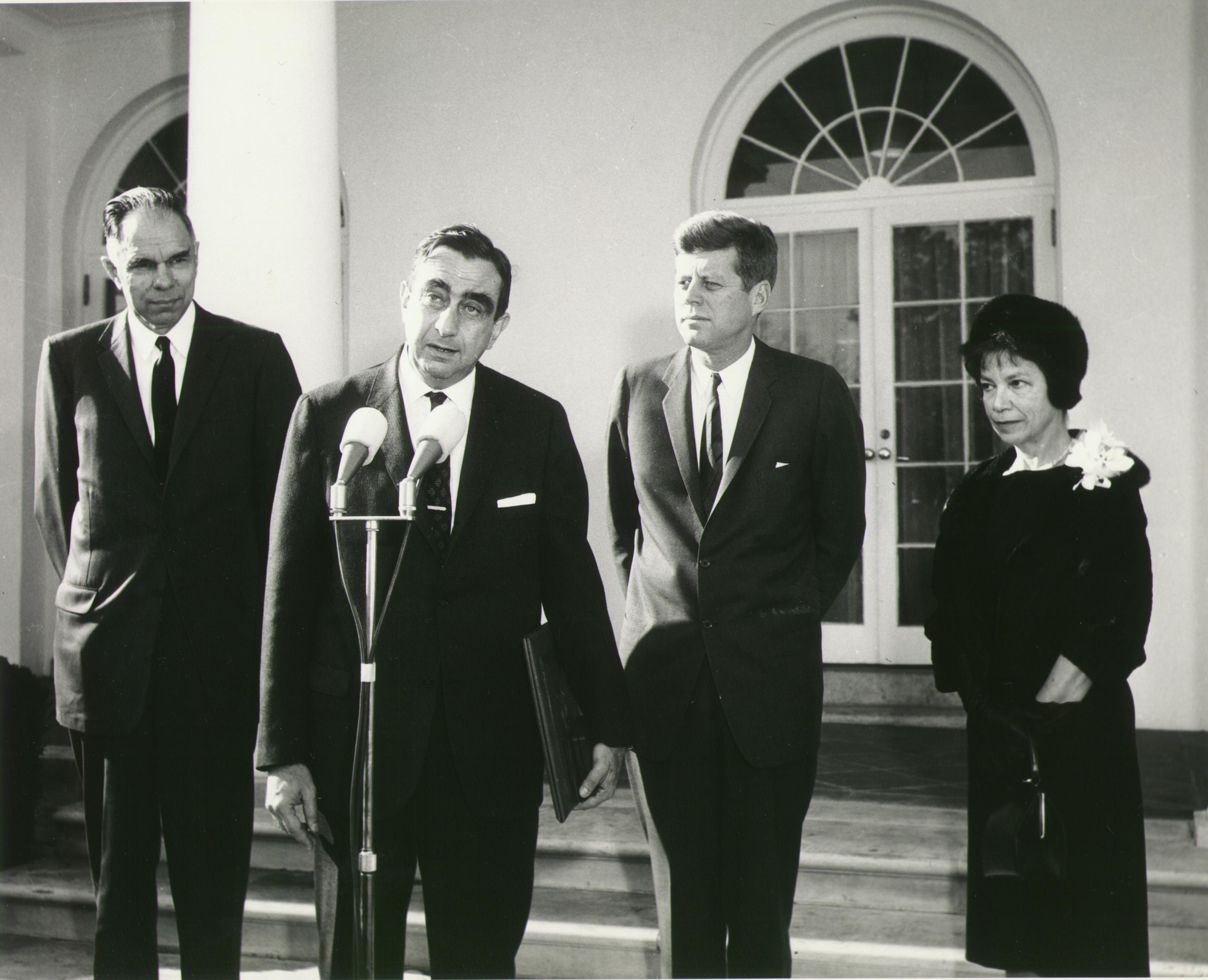
Mici Teller (right) at the 1962 White House ceremony where Edward Teller received the Fermi Award from President John Kennedy.

In April 1943, Mici joined Edward at Los Alamos National Laboratory. There, she worked in the computations division part-time along with other wives of Los Alamos scientists and workers. The group fell under the Theoretical Division headed by physicist Hans Bethe.

In 1944, Mici's brother, Suki, was killed in the Mauthausen concentration camp, causing her great grief to the point where she was unable to talk about her brother.

In the late 1940s, the Teller family moved from Los Alamos, New Mexico to Chicago so they could work at Argonne National Laboratory. Mici wrote an early version of the code for the MANIAC I computer. She also was a co-author of the first paper introducing Markov chain Monte Carlo simulation, though the final code used in the publication was written in entirety by Arianna Rosenbluth. The paper, "Equation of State Calculations by Fast Computing Machines," was published in the Journal of Chemical Physics in 1953. Edward Teller contributed the idea of using statistical mechanics, while Mici helped write the program in its early phase.

The Tellers made a final move in the 1950s to California. Mici also ran a scholarship program called the Bay Area Pilot Project for students pursuing degrees in mathematics and science. At 91, on June 4, 2000, Augusta "Mici" Teller died from lung disease.
