= Edward Teller =

Hungarian-American physicist (1908–2003)

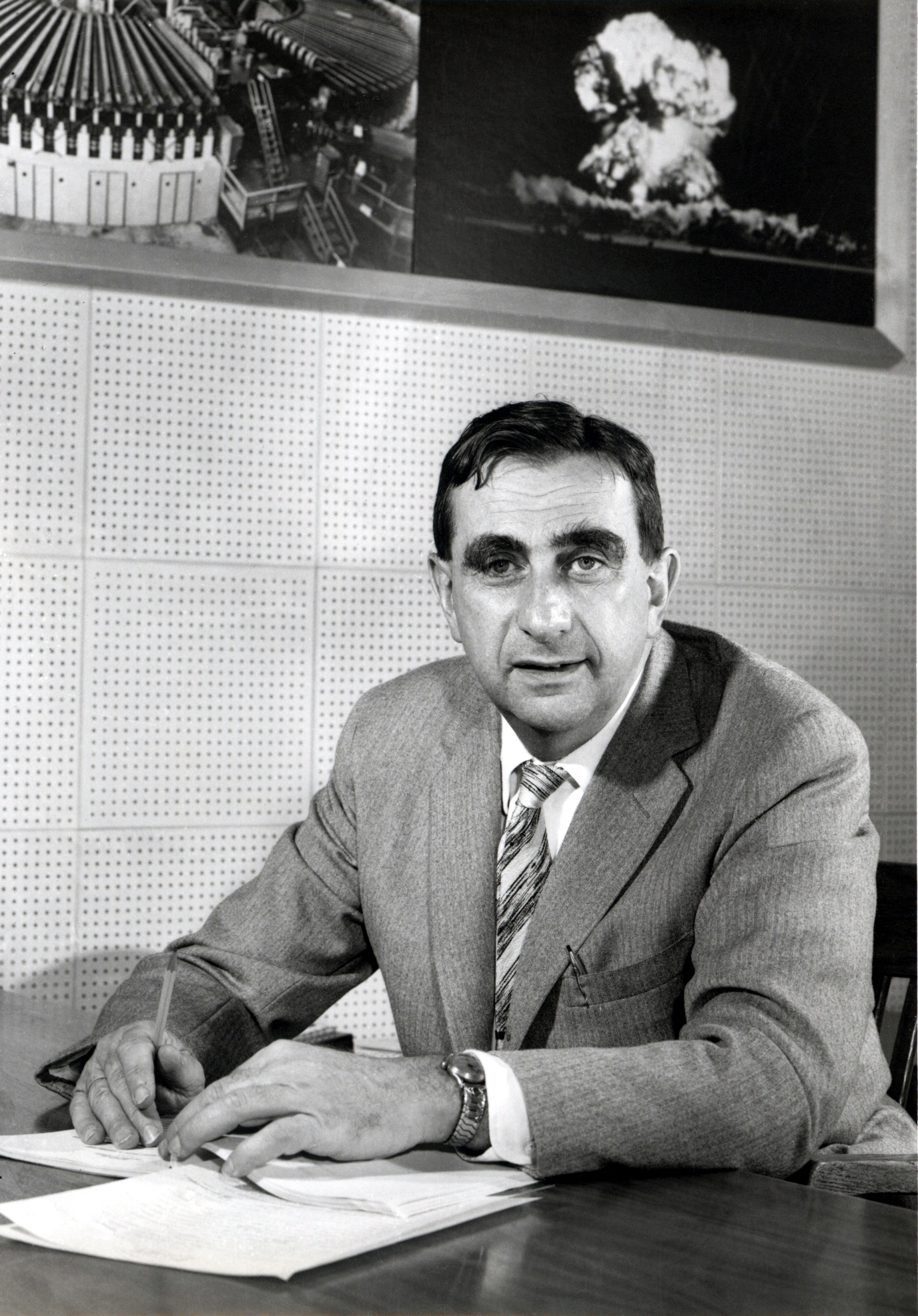
- Teller in 1958
- Born: Teller Ede; January 15, 1908; Budapest, Austria-Hungary
- Died: September 9, 2003 (aged 95); Stanford, California, U.S.
- Citizenship: Hungary; United States (March 6, 1941)
- Education: University of Karlsruhe (TH) (B.Sc.); Ludwig-Maximilians-Universität München; Leipzig University (Ph.D.)
- Known for: Hydrogen bomb; Teller–Ulam design; Ashkin–Teller model; Brunauer–Emmett–Teller theory; Gamow–Teller transition; Inglis–Teller equation; Jahn–Teller effect; Lyddane–Sachs–Teller relation; Pöschl–Teller potential; Renner–Teller effect; Metropolis–Hastings algorithm
- Spouse: Augusta Maria Harkanyi (m. 1934; died 2000)
- Children: 2
- Awards: Presidential Medal of Freedom (2003); National Medal of Science (1982); Eringen Medal (1980); Harvey Prize (1975); Enrico Fermi Award (1962); Albert Einstein Award (1958)
- Scientific career
- Fields: Physics (theoretical)
- Workplaces: George Washington University; University of Göttingen; Bohr Institute; University College London; Manhattan Project; University of Chicago; Florida Institute of Technology; University of California, Davis; University of California, Berkeley; Lawrence Livermore Laboratory; Hoover Institution
- Thesis: Über das Wasserstoffmolekülion (1930)
- Doctoral advisor: Werner Heisenberg
- Doctoral students: Laszlo Tisza (1932); Charles Critchfield (1939); Marvin L. Goldberger (1948); Boris Jacobsohn (1947); Yang Chen-Ning (1949); Lincoln Wolfenstein (1949); Marshall Rosenbluth (1949); Hans-Peter Dürr (1956)
- Other notable students: Jack Steinberger

Edward Teller (Hungarian: Teller Ede; 15 January 1908 – 9 September 2003) was a Hungarian-American theoretical physicist and chemical engineer who is known colloquially as "the father of the hydrogen bomb" and one of the creators of the Teller–Ulam design inspired by Stanisław Ulam.

Born in Austria-Hungary in 1908, Teller emigrated to the US in the 1930s, one of the many so-called "Martians", a group of Hungarian scientist émigrés. He made numerous contributions to nuclear and molecular physics, spectroscopy, and surface physics. His extension of Enrico Fermi's theory of beta decay, in the form of Gamow–Teller transitions, provided an important stepping stone in its application, while the Jahn–Teller effect and Brunauer–Emmett–Teller (BET) theory have retained their original formulation and are mainstays in physics and chemistry.

Teller made contributions to Thomas–Fermi theory, the precursor of density functional theory, a standard tool in the quantum mechanical treatment of complex molecules. In 1953, with Nicholas Metropolis, Arianna Rosenbluth, Marshall Rosenbluth, and Augusta Teller, Teller co-authored a paper that is a starting point for the application of the Monte Carlo method to statistical mechanics and the Markov chain Monte Carlo literature in Bayesian statistics. Teller was an early member of the Manhattan Project, which developed the atomic bomb. He made a concerted push to develop fusion-based weapons, but ultimately fusion bombs only appeared after World War II. To get support for the hydrogen bomb project, Teller supported and worked on the George shot of the Operation Greenhouse nuclear tests, resulting in the world's first thermonuclear burn. He co-founded the Lawrence Livermore National Laboratory and was its director or associate director.

Teller continued to find support from the US government and military research establishment, particularly for his advocacy for nuclear power development, a strong nuclear arsenal, and a vigorous nuclear testing program. In his later years, he advocated controversial technological solutions to military and civilian problems, including a plan to excavate an artificial harbor in Alaska using a thermonuclear explosive in what was called Project Chariot, and Ronald Reagan's Strategic Defense Initiative. Teller was a recipient of the Enrico Fermi Award and Albert Einstein Award. He died in 2003, at 95.

== Early life and work ==
Ede Teller was born on January 15, 1908, in Budapest, then part of Austria-Hungary, into a Jewish family. His parents were Ilona (née Deutsch), a pianist, and Miksa Teller, an attorney. He attended the Minta Gymnasium in Budapest. Teller was an agnostic. "Religion was not an issue in my family", he later wrote, "indeed, it was never discussed. My only religious training came because the Minta required that all students take classes in their respective religions. My family celebrated one holiday, the Day of Atonement, when we all fasted. Yet my father said prayers for his parents on Saturdays and on all the Jewish holidays. The idea of God that I absorbed was that it would be wonderful if He existed: We needed Him desperately but had not seen Him in many thousands of years." Teller was a late talker, but he became very interested in numbers and, for fun, calculated large numbers in his head.

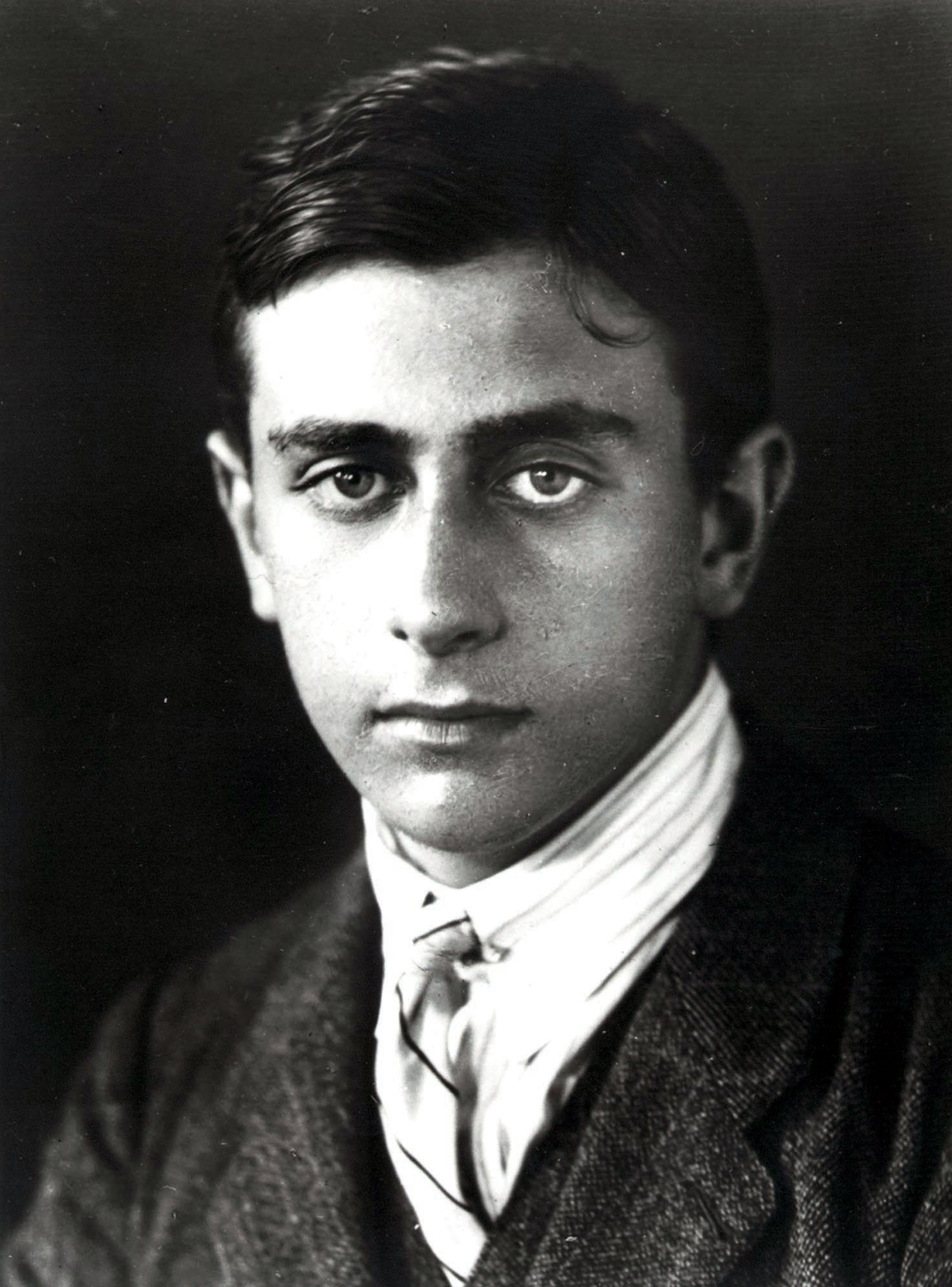
Teller in his youth

Teller left Hungary for Germany in 1926, partly due to the discriminatory numerus clausus rule under Miklós Horthy's regime. The political climate and revolutions in Hungary during his youth instilled a lingering animosity toward Communism and Fascism.

From 1926 to 1928, Teller studied mathematics and chemistry at the University of Karlsruhe (TH), from which he graduated with a Bachelor of Science in chemical engineering. He once stated that the person who was responsible for his becoming a physicist was Herman Mark, who was a visiting professor, after hearing lectures on molecular spectroscopy where Mark made it clear to him that it was new ideas in physics that were radically changing the frontier of chemistry. Mark was an expert in polymer chemistry, a field which is essential to understanding biochemistry, and Mark taught him about the leading breakthroughs in quantum physics made by Louis de Broglie, among others. It was his exposure to Mark's lectures that initially motivated Teller to switch to physics. After informing his father of his intent to switch, his father was so concerned that he traveled to visit him and speak with his professors at the school. While a degree in chemical engineering was a sure path to a well-paying job at chemical companies, there was no such clear-cut route for a career with a degree in physics. He was not privy to the discussions his father had with his professors, but the result was that he got his father's permission to become a physicist.

Teller then attended the Ludwig-Maximilians-Universität München, where he studied physics under Arnold Sommerfeld. In 1928, while still a student at the Ludwig-Maximilians-Universität München, he fell under a streetcar and his right foot was nearly severed. For the rest of his life, he walked with a limp, and on occasion he wore a prosthetic foot. The painkillers he was taking were interfering with his thinking, so he decided to stop taking them, instead using his willpower to deal with the pain, including use of the placebo effect, by which he convinced himself that he had taken painkillers rather than water. Werner Heisenberg said that it was the hardiness of Teller's spirit, rather than stoicism, that allowed him to cope so well with the accident.

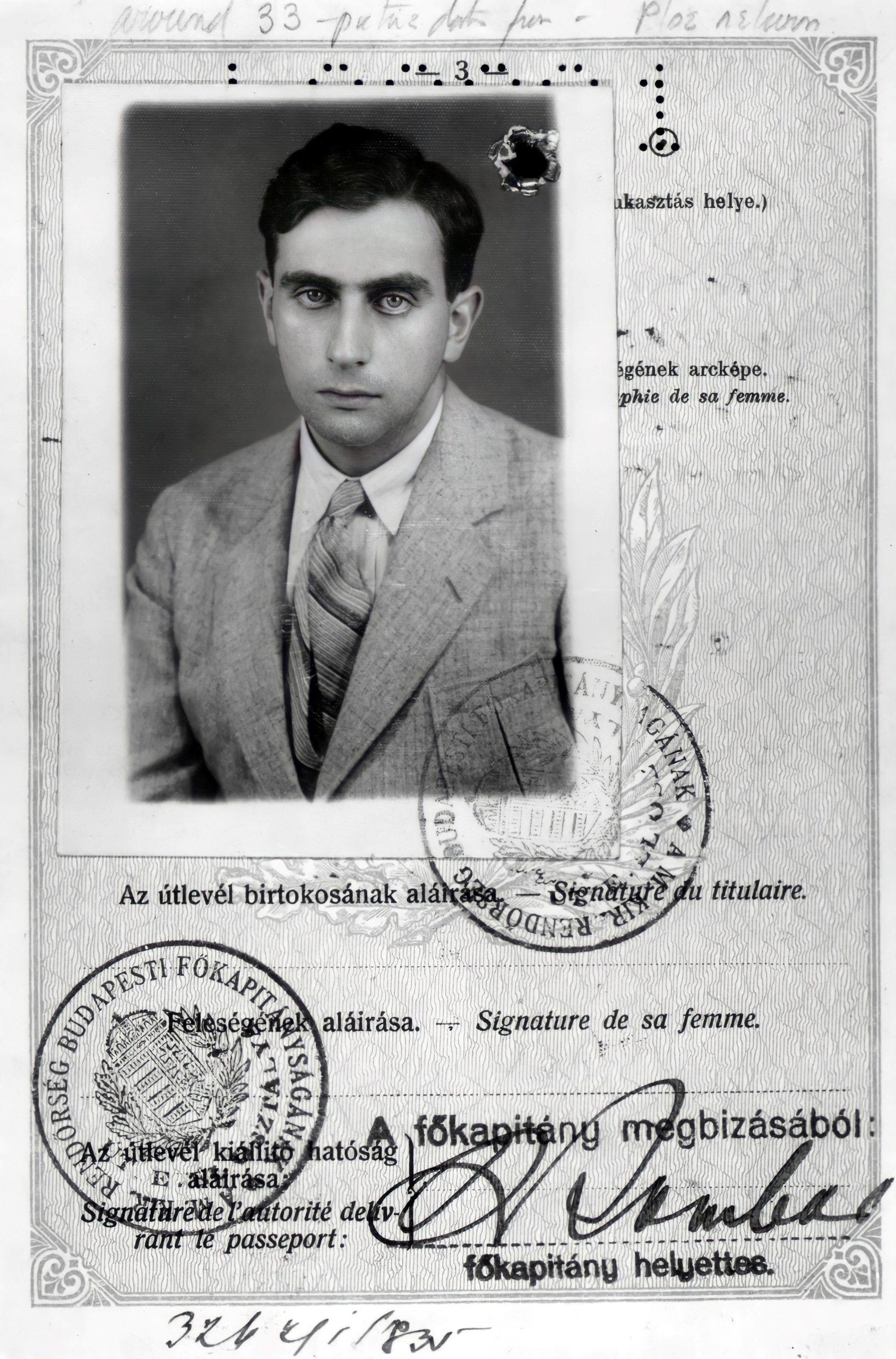
The Hungarian passport Teller carried when he entered the United States in 1935.

In 1929, Teller transferred to Leipzig University, where in 1930, he received his PhD in physics under Heisenberg. Teller's dissertation dealt with one of the first accurate quantum mechanical treatments of the hydrogen molecular ion. That year, he befriended Russian physicists George Gamow and Lev Landau. Teller's lifelong friendship with a Czech physicist, George Placzek, was also very important for his scientific and philosophical development. It was Placzek who arranged a summer stay in Rome with Enrico Fermi in 1932, thus orienting Teller's scientific career in nuclear physics. Also in 1930, Teller moved to the University of Göttingen, then one of the world's great centers of physics due to the presence of Max Born and James Franck, but after Adolf Hitler became Chancellor of Germany in January 1933, Germany became unsafe for Jewish people, and he left through the aid of the International Rescue Committee. He went briefly to England, and moved for a year to Copenhagen, where he worked under Niels Bohr. In February 1934, he married his long-time girlfriend Augusta Maria "Mici" (pronounced "Mitzi") Harkanyi, who was the sister of a friend. Since Mici was a Calvinist Christian, Edward and she were married in a Calvinist church. He returned to England in September 1934.

Mici had been a student in Pittsburgh and wanted to return to the United States. Her chance came in 1935, when, thanks to George Gamow, Teller was invited to the United States to become a professor of physics at George Washington University, where he worked with Gamow until 1941. At George Washington University in 1937, Teller predicted the Jahn–Teller effect, which distorts molecules in certain situations; this affects the chemical reactions of metals, and in particular the coloration of certain metallic dyes. Teller and Hermann Arthur Jahn analyzed it as a piece of purely mathematical physics. In collaboration with Stephen Brunauer and Paul Hugh Emmett, Teller also made an important contribution to surface physics and chemistry: the so-called Brunauer–Emmett–Teller (BET) isotherm. Teller and Mici became naturalized citizens of the United States on March 6, 1941.

At GWU, Teller organized annually with Gamow the Washington Conferences on Theoretical Physics (1935–1947) that gathered top-level physicists.

When World War II began, Teller wanted to contribute to the war effort. On the advice of the well-known Caltech aerodynamicist and fellow Hungarian émigré Theodore von Kármán, Teller collaborated with his friend Hans Bethe in developing a theory of shock-wave propagation. In later years, their explanation of the behavior of the gas behind such a wave proved valuable to scientists who were studying missile re-entry.

== Manhattan Project ==
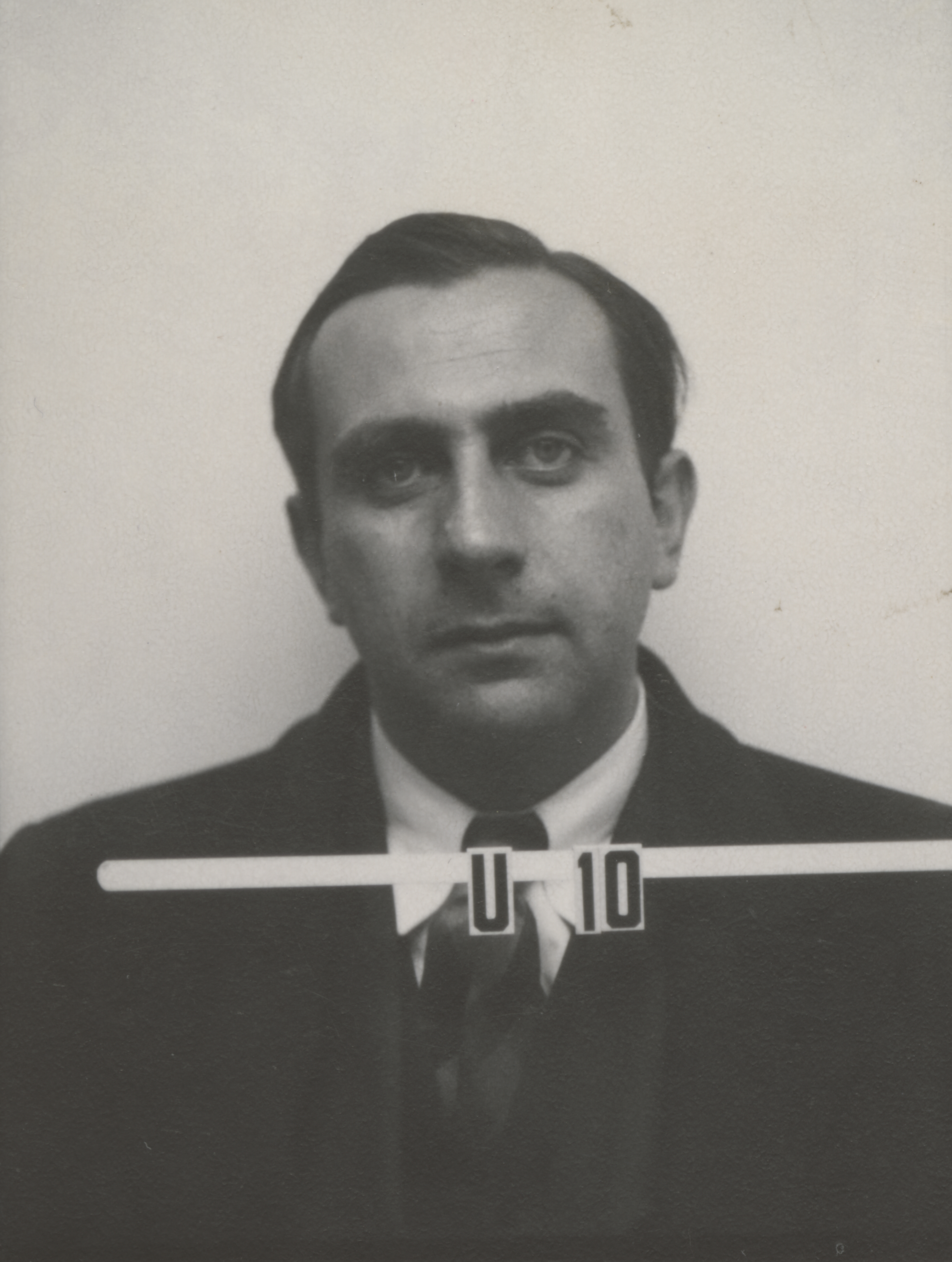
Teller's ID badge photo from Los Alamos

=== Los Alamos Laboratory ===
In 1942, Teller was invited to be part of Robert Oppenheimer's summer planning seminar at the University of California, Berkeley, on the origins of the Manhattan Project, the US effort to develop the first nuclear weapons. A few weeks earlier, Teller had been meeting with his friend and colleague Enrico Fermi about the prospects of atomic warfare, and Fermi had nonchalantly suggested that perhaps a weapon based on nuclear fission could be used to set off an even larger nuclear fusion reaction. Even though he initially explained to Fermi why he thought the idea would not work, Teller was fascinated by the possibility and was quickly bored with the idea of "just" an atomic bomb, even though this was not yet anywhere near completion. At the Berkeley session, Teller diverted the discussion from the fission weapon to the possibility of a fusion weapon—what he called the "Super", an early conception of the hydrogen bomb.

Arthur Compton, the chairman of the University of Chicago physics department, coordinated the uranium research of Columbia University, Princeton University, the University of Chicago, and the University of California, Berkeley. To remove disagreement and duplication, Compton transferred the scientists to the Metallurgical Laboratory at Chicago. Even though Teller and Mici were now American citizens, they had relatives in enemy countries, so Teller did not at first go to Chicago. In early 1943, construction of the Los Alamos Laboratory in New Mexico began. With Oppenheimer as its director, the laboratory's purpose was to design an atomic bomb. Teller moved there in March 1943. In Los Alamos, he annoyed his neighbors by playing piano late at night.

Teller became part of the Theoretical (T) Division. He was given a secret identity of Ed Tilden. He was irked at being passed over as its head; the job was instead given to Hans Bethe. Oppenheimer had him investigate unusual approaches to building fission weapons, such as autocatalysis, in which the efficiency of the bomb would increase as the nuclear chain reaction progressed, but proved to be impractical. He also investigated using uranium hydride instead of uranium metal, but its efficiency turned out to be "negligible or less". He continued to push his ideas for a fusion weapon even though it had been put on a low priority during the war (as the creation of a fission weapon proved to be difficult enough). On a visit to New York, he asked Maria Goeppert-Mayer to carry out calculations on the Super for him. She confirmed Teller's own results: the Super was not going to work.

A special group was established under Teller in March 1944 to investigate the mathematics of an implosion-type nuclear weapon. It too ran into difficulties. Because of his interest in the Super, Teller did not work as hard on the implosion calculations as Bethe wanted. These too were originally low-priority tasks, but the discovery of spontaneous fission in plutonium by Emilio Segrè's group gave the implosion bomb increased importance. In June 1944, at Bethe's request, Oppenheimer moved Teller out of T Division and placed him in charge of a special group responsible for the Super, reporting directly to Oppenheimer. He was replaced by Rudolf Peierls from the British Mission, who in turn brought in Klaus Fuchs, who was later revealed to be a Soviet spy. Teller's Super group became part of Fermi's F Division when he joined the Los Alamos Laboratory in September 1944. It included Stanislaw Ulam, Jane Roberg, Geoffrey Chew, Harold and Mary Argo, and Maria Goeppert-Mayer.

Teller made valuable contributions to bomb research, especially in the elucidation of the implosion mechanism. He was the first to propose the solid pit design that was eventually successful. This design became known as a "Christy pit", after the physicist Robert F. Christy who made it a reality. Teller was one of the few scientists to watch (with eye protection) the Trinity nuclear test in July 1945, rather than follow orders to lie on the ground with backs turned. He later said that the atomic flash "was as if I had pulled open the curtain in a dark room and broad daylight streamed in".

=== Decision to drop the bombs ===
In the days before and after the first demonstration of a nuclear weapon (the Trinity test in July 1945), Hungarian Leo Szilard circulated the Szílard petition, which argued that a demonstration to the Japanese of the new weapon should occur before actual use on Japan, and that the weapons should never be used on people. In response to Szilard's petition, Teller consulted his friend Robert Oppenheimer. Teller believed that Oppenheimer was a natural leader and could help him with such a formidable political problem. Oppenheimer reassured Teller that the nation's fate should be left to the sensible politicians in Washington. Bolstered by Oppenheimer's influence, he decided not to sign the petition.

Teller therefore penned a letter in response to Szilard that read:

I am not really convinced of your objections. I do not feel that there is any chance to outlaw any one weapon. If we have a slim chance of survival, it lies in the possibility to get rid of wars. The more decisive a weapon is the more surely it will be used in any real conflict and no agreements will help. Our only hope is in getting the facts of our results before the people. This might help to convince everybody that the next war would be fatal. For this purpose actual combat-use might even be the best thing.

On reflection on this letter years later, when he was writing his memoirs, Teller wrote:

First, Szilard was right. As scientists who worked on producing the bomb, we bore a special responsibility. Second, Oppenheimer was right. We did not know enough about the political situation to have a valid opinion. Third, what we should have done but failed to do was to work out the technical changes required for demonstrating the bomb [very high] over Tokyo and submit that information to President Truman.

Unknown to Teller at the time, four of his colleagues were solicited by the then-secret May to June 1945 Interim Committee. It is this organization that ultimately decided on how the new weapons should initially be used. The committee's four-member Scientific Panel was led by Oppenheimer, and concluded immediate military use on Japan was the best option:

The opinions of our scientific colleagues on the initial use of these weapons are not unanimous: they range from the proposal of a purely technical demonstration to that of the military application best designed to induce surrender ... Others emphasize the opportunity of saving American lives by immediate military use ... We find ourselves closer to these latter views; we can propose no technical demonstration likely to bring an end to the war; we see no acceptable alternative to direct military use.

Teller later learned of Oppenheimer's solicitation and his role in the Interim Committee's decision to drop the bombs, having secretly endorsed an immediate military use of the new weapons. This was contrary to the impression that Teller had received when he had personally asked Oppenheimer about the Szilard petition: that the nation's fate should be left to the sensible politicians in Washington. Following Teller's discovery of this, his relationship with his advisor began to deteriorate.

In 1990, the historian Barton Bernstein argued that it is an "unconvincing claim" by Teller that he was a "covert dissenter" to the use of the bomb. In his 2001 Memoirs, Teller claims that he did lobby Oppenheimer, but that Oppenheimer had convinced him that he should take no action and that the scientists should leave military questions in the hands of the military; Teller claims he was not aware that Oppenheimer and other scientists were being consulted as to the actual use of the weapon and implies that Oppenheimer was being hypocritical.

== Hydrogen bomb ==
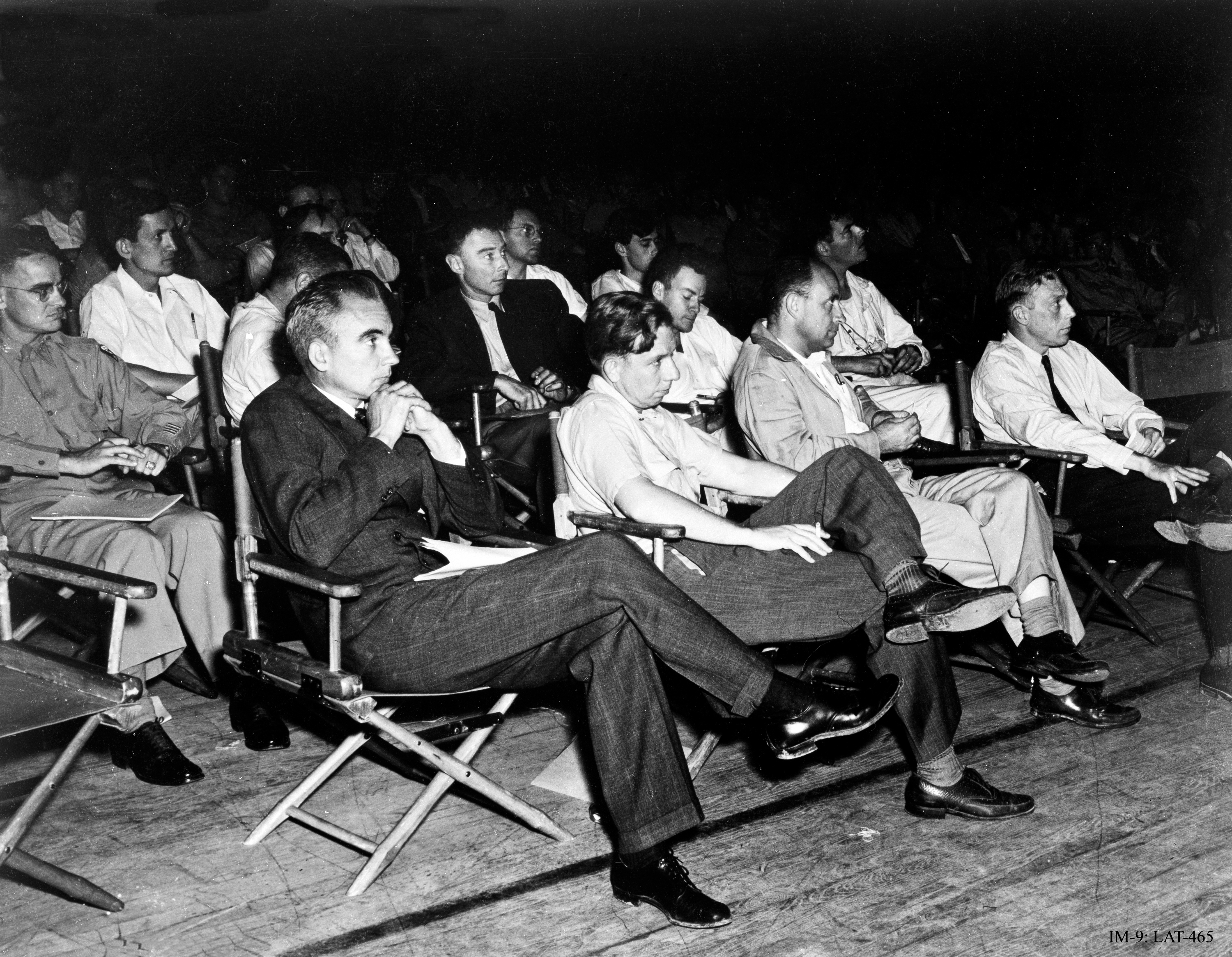
Physicists at a Manhattan District–sponsored colloquium at Los Alamos on the Super in April 1946. In the front row are (left to right) Norris Bradbury, John Manley, Enrico Fermi and J. M. B. Kellogg. Robert Oppenheimer, in dark coat, is behind Manley; to Oppenheimer's left is Richard Feynman. The Army officer on the left is Colonel Oliver Haywood.

Despite an offer from Norris Bradbury, who had replaced Oppenheimer as the director of Los Alamos in November 1945 to become the head of the Theoretical (T) Division, Teller left Los Alamos on February 1, 1946, to return to the University of Chicago as a professor and close associate of Fermi and Maria Goeppert Mayer. Goeppert-Mayer's work on the internal structure of the elements would earn her the Nobel Prize in Physics in 1963.

On April 18–20, 1946, Teller participated in a conference at Los Alamos to review the wartime work on the Super. The properties of thermonuclear fuels such as deuterium and the possible design of a hydrogen bomb were discussed. It was concluded that Teller's assessment of a hydrogen bomb had been too favorable, and that both the quantity of deuterium needed, as well as the radiation losses during deuterium burning, would shed doubt on its workability. Addition of expensive tritium to the thermonuclear mixture would likely lower its ignition temperature, but even so, nobody knew at that time how much tritium would be needed, and whether even tritium addition would encourage heat propagation.

At the end of the conference, despite opposition by some members such as Robert Serber, Teller submitted an optimistic report in which he said that a hydrogen bomb was feasible, and that further work should be encouraged on its development. Fuchs also participated in this conference and transmitted this information to Moscow. With John von Neumann, he contributed the idea of using implosion to ignite the Super. The model of Teller's "classical Super" was so uncertain that Oppenheimer would later say that he wished the Russians were building their own hydrogen bomb based on that design, as it would almost certainly delay their progress on it.

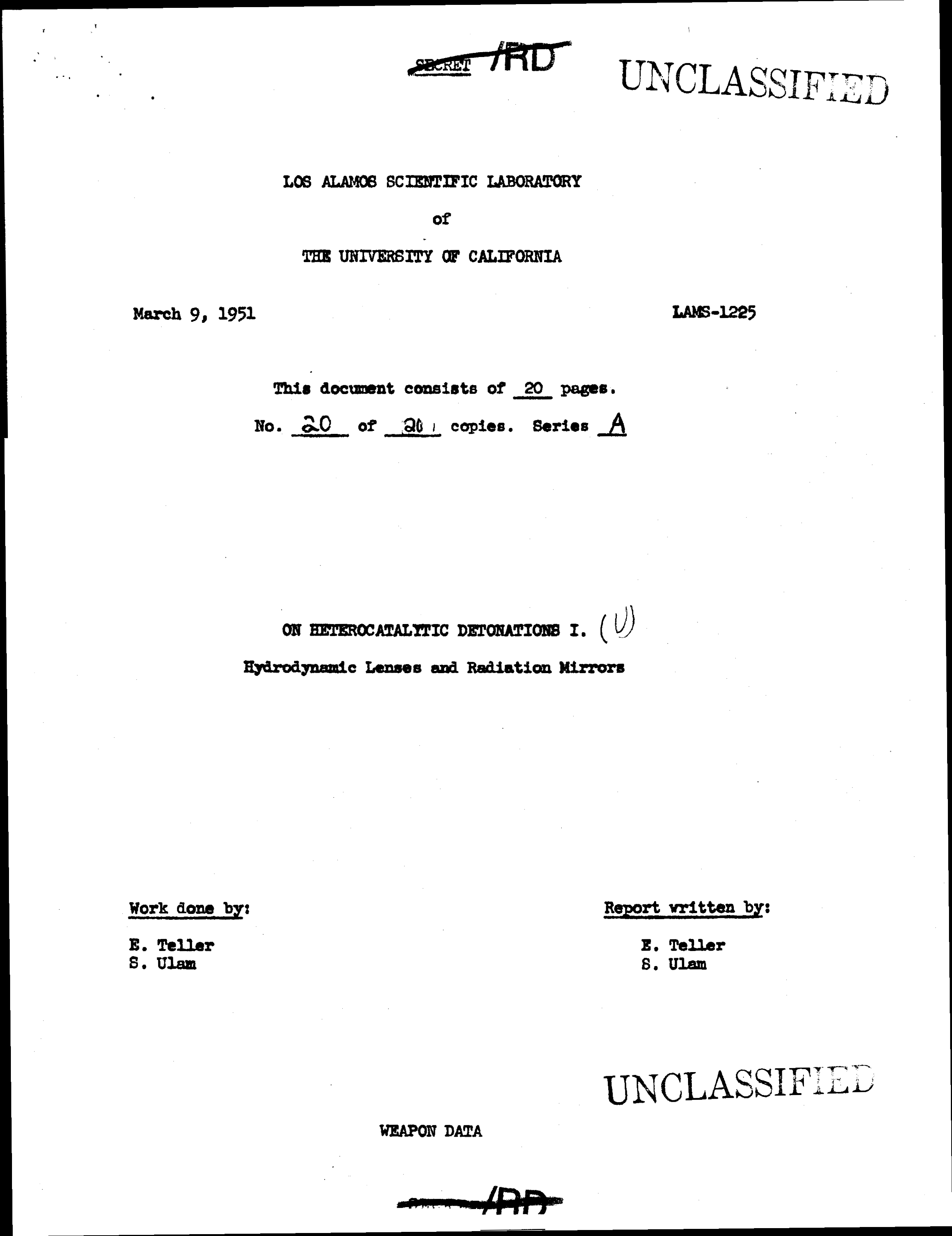
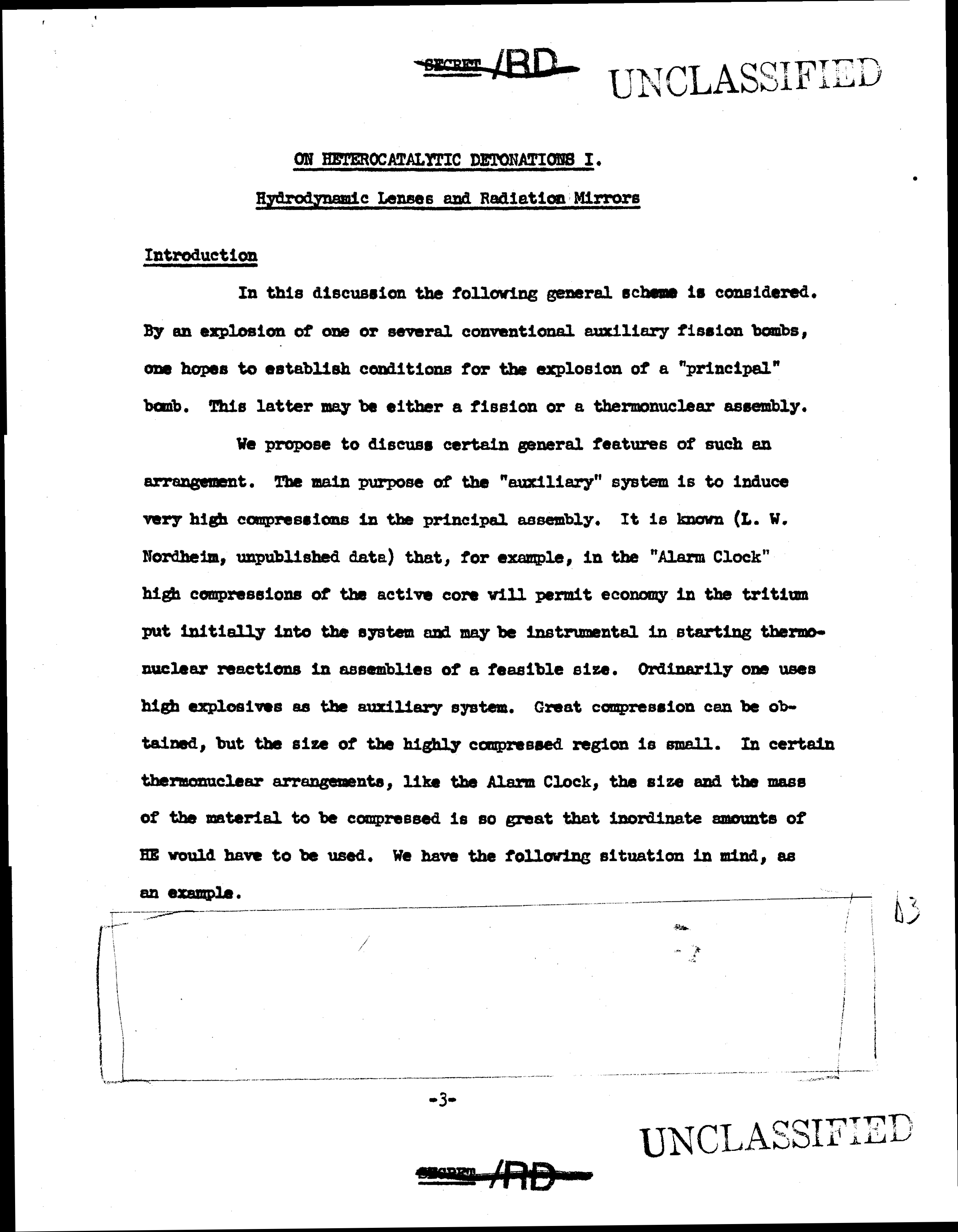
Classified paper by Teller and Ulam on March 9, 1951: On Heterocatalytic Detonations I: Hydrodynamic Lenses and Radiation Mirrors, in which they proposed their revolutionary new design, staged implosion, the secret of the hydrogen bomb.

The Teller–Ulam design kept the fission and fusion fuel physically separated from one another, and used X-rays from the primary device "reflected" off the surrounding casing to compress the secondary.

By 1949, Soviet-backed governments had already begun seizing control throughout Eastern Europe, forming such puppet states as the Hungarian People's Republic in Teller's homeland of Hungary, where much of his family still lived, on August 20, 1949. Following the Soviet Union's first test detonation of an atomic bomb on August 29, 1949, President Harry Truman announced a crash development program for a hydrogen bomb.

Teller returned to Los Alamos in 1950 to work on the project. He insisted on involving more theorists, but many of Teller's prominent colleagues, like Fermi and Oppenheimer, were sure that the project of the H-bomb was technically infeasible and politically undesirable. None of the available designs was yet workable. However, Soviet scientists who had worked on their own hydrogen bomb have claimed that they developed it independently.

In 1950, calculations by the Polish mathematician Stanislaw Ulam and his collaborator Cornelius Everett, along with confirmations by Fermi, had shown that not only was Teller's earlier estimate of the quantity of tritium needed for the reaction to begin too low, but that even with more tritium, the energy loss in the fusion process would be too great to enable the fusion reaction to propagate. In 1951, Teller and Ulam made a breakthrough and invented a new design, proposed in a classified March 1951 paper, On Heterocatalytic Detonations I: Hydrodynamic Lenses and Radiation Mirrors, for a practical megaton-range H-bomb. The exact contribution provided respectively from Ulam and Teller to what became known as the Teller–Ulam design is not definitively known in the public domain, and the exact contributions of each and how the final idea was arrived upon have been a point of dispute in both public and classified discussions since the early 1950s.

In an interview with Scientific American from 1999, Teller told the reporter:

I contributed; Ulam did not. I'm sorry I had to answer it in this abrupt way. Ulam was rightly dissatisfied with an old approach. He came to me with a part of an idea which I already had worked out and had difficulty getting people to listen to. He was willing to sign a paper. When it then came to defending that paper and really putting work into it, he refused. He said, "I don't believe in it."

The issue is controversial. Bethe considered Teller's contribution to the invention of the H-bomb a true innovation as early as 1952, and referred to his work as a "stroke of genius" in 1954. In both cases, Bethe emphasized Teller's role as a way of stressing that the development of the H-bomb could not have been hastened by additional support or funding, and Teller greatly disagreed with Bethe's assessment. Other scientists (antagonistic to Teller, such as J. Carson Mark) have claimed that Teller would have never gotten any closer without the assistance of Ulam and others. Ulam himself claimed that Teller only produced a "more generalized" version of Ulam's original design.

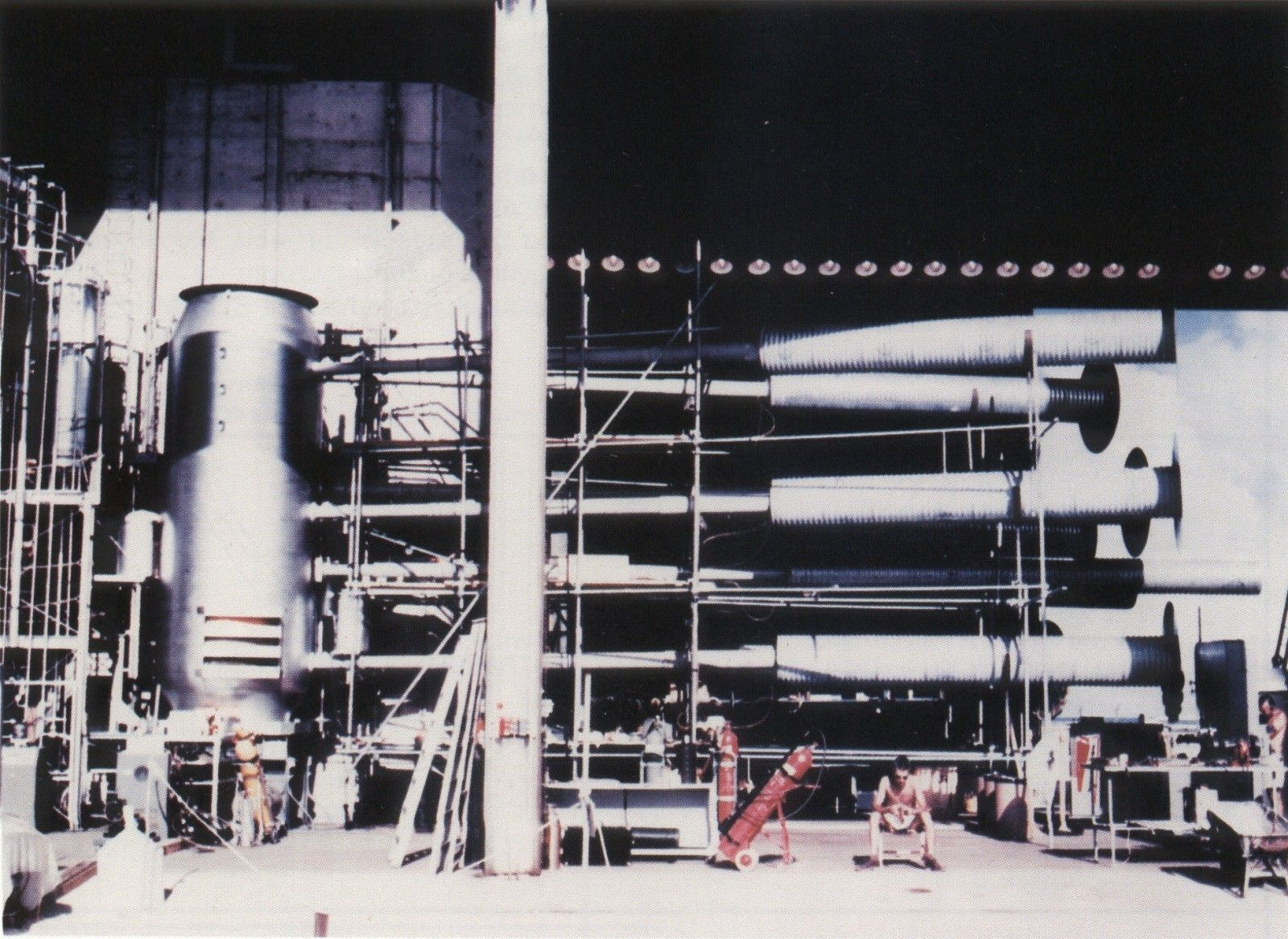
A view of the Ivy-Mike "SAUSAGE" device; the world's first ever fully-fledged thermonuclear device, with its instrumentation and cryogenic equipment attached. The long pipes were for measurement purposes; their function was to transmit the first radiation from the "primary" and "secondary" stages (known as "Teller light") to instruments just as the device was detonated, before being destroyed in the explosion. The man seated lower right shows scale.

The breakthrough—the details of which are still classified—was apparently the separation of the fission and fusion components of the weapons, and to use the X-rays produced by the fission bomb to first compress the fusion fuel (by a process known as "radiation implosion") before igniting it. Ulam's idea seems to have been to use mechanical shock from the primary to encourage fusion in the secondary, while Teller quickly realized that X-rays from the primary would do the job much more symmetrically. Some members of the laboratory (J. Carson Mark in particular) later expressed the opinion that the idea to use the X-rays would have eventually occurred to anyone working on the physical processes involved, and that the obvious reason why Teller thought of it right away was because he was already working on the "Greenhouse" tests for the spring of 1951, in which the effect of X-rays from a fission bomb on a mixture of deuterium and tritium was going to be investigated.

Priscilla Johnson McMillan in her book The Ruin of J. Robert Oppenheimer: And the Birth of the Modern Arms Race, writes that Teller "concealed the role" of Ulam, and that only "radiation implosion" was Teller's idea. Teller even refused to sign the patent application, because it would need Ulam's signature. Thomas Powers writes that "of course the bomb designers all knew the truth, and many considered Teller the lowest, most contemptible kind of offender in the world of science, a stealer of credit".

Whatever the actual components of the so-called Teller–Ulam design and the respective contributions of those who worked on it, after it was proposed, it was immediately seen by the scientists working on the project as the answer that had been so long sought. Those who had previously doubted whether a fission-fusion bomb would be feasible at all were converted into believing that it was only a matter of time before both the US and the USSR had developed multi-megaton weapons. Even Oppenheimer, who was originally opposed to the project, called the idea "technically sweet".

The successful "Ivy Mike" shot of 1952; the world's first fully-fledged thermonuclear explosion, appeared to vindicate Teller's long-time advocacy for the hydrogen bomb.

Though he had helped to come up with the design and had been a long-time proponent of the concept, Teller was not chosen to head the development project (his reputation for being a thorny personality likely played a role in this). In 1952, he left Los Alamos and joined the newly established Livermore branch of the University of California Radiation Laboratory, which had been created largely through his urging. After the detonation of Ivy Mike, the first thermonuclear weapon to utilize the Teller–Ulam configuration, on November 1, 1952, Teller became known in the press as the "father of the hydrogen bomb". Teller himself refrained from attending the test—he claimed not to feel welcome at the Pacific Proving Grounds—and instead saw its results on a seismograph at Berkeley.

There was an opinion that by analyzing the fallout from this test, the Soviets (led in their H-bomb work by Andrei Sakharov) could have deciphered the new American design. However, this was later denied by the Soviet bomb researchers. Because of official secrecy, little information about the bomb's development was released by the government, and press reports often attributed the entire weapon's design and development to Teller and his new Livermore Laboratory (when it was actually developed by Los Alamos).

Many of Teller's colleagues were irritated that he seemed to enjoy taking full credit for something he had only a part in, and in response, with encouragement from Enrico Fermi, Teller authored an article titled "The Work of Many People", which appeared in Science magazine in February 1955, emphasizing that he was not alone in the weapon's development. He would later write in his memoirs that he had told a "white lie" in the 1955 article to "soothe ruffled feelings" and claimed full credit for the invention.

Teller was known for getting engrossed in projects which were theoretically interesting but practically infeasible (the classic "Super" was one such project.) About his work on the hydrogen bomb, Bethe said:

Nobody will blame Teller because the calculations of 1946 were wrong, especially because adequate computing machines were not then available. But he was blamed at Los Alamos for leading the Laboratory, and indeed the whole country, into an adventurous program on the basis of calculations which he himself must have known to have been very incomplete.

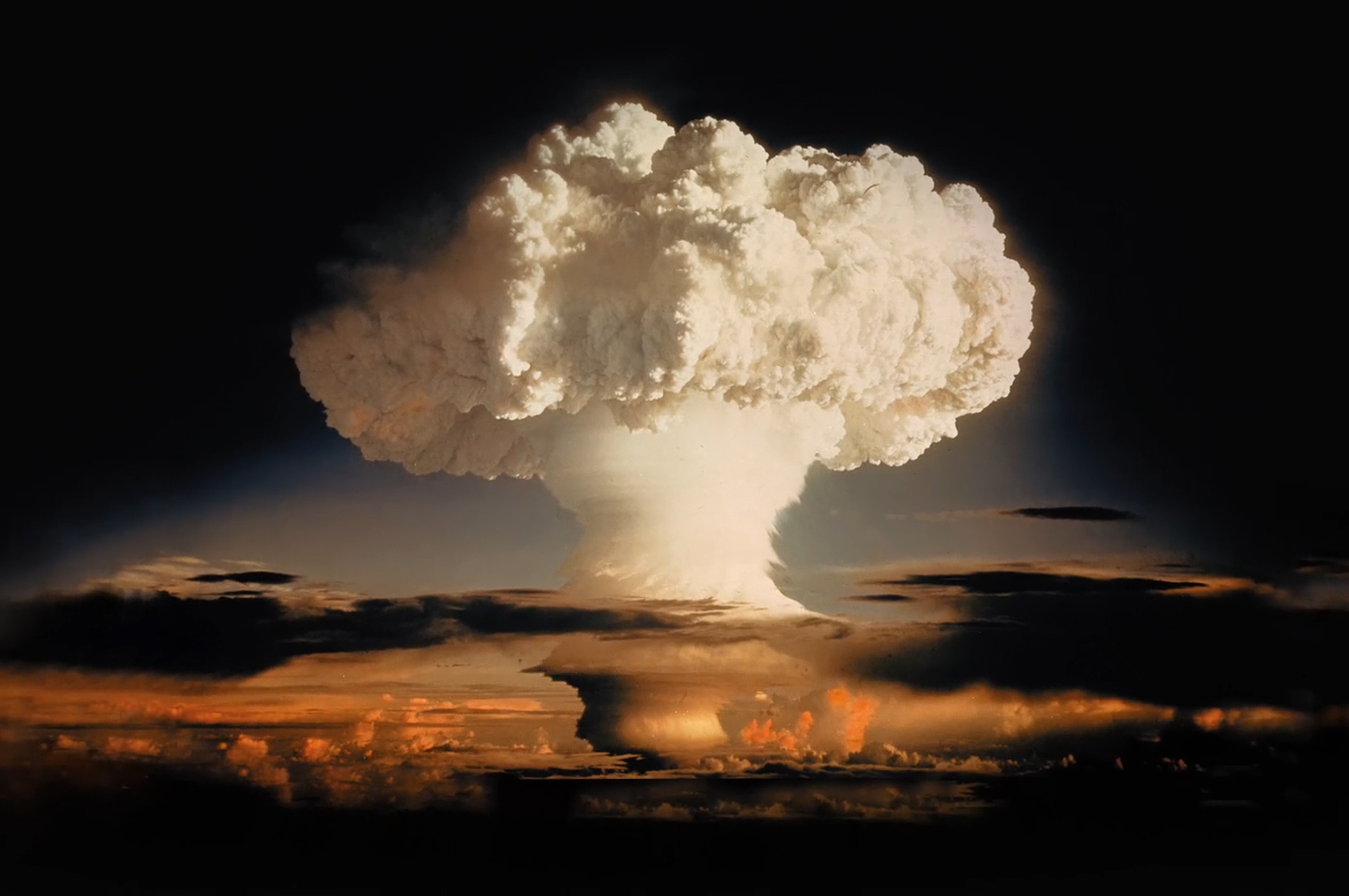
Mike mushroom cloud, yielding 10.4 megatons.

During the Manhattan Project, Teller advocated the development of a bomb using uranium hydride, which many of his fellow theorists said would be unlikely to work. At Livermore, Teller continued work on the uranium hydride bomb, and the result was a dud. Ulam once wrote to a colleague about an idea he had shared with Teller: "Edward is full of enthusiasm about these possibilities; this is perhaps an indication they will not work." Fermi once said that Teller was the only monomaniac he knew who had several manias.

Carey Sublette of Nuclear Weapon Archive argues that Ulam came up with the radiation implosion compression design of thermonuclear weapons, but that, on the other hand, Teller has gotten little credit for being the first to propose fusion boosting in 1945, which is essential for miniaturization and reliability and is used in all of today's nuclear weapons.

In the early 1950s Edward Teller proposed project Sundial at a meeting of the General Advisory Committee of the Atomic Energy Commission, the bomb was intended to have a yield of 10 gigatons of TNT, while its counterpart, Gnomon, was intended to have a yield of 1 gigaton. Neither device was ever built or tested.

== Oppenheimer controversy ==
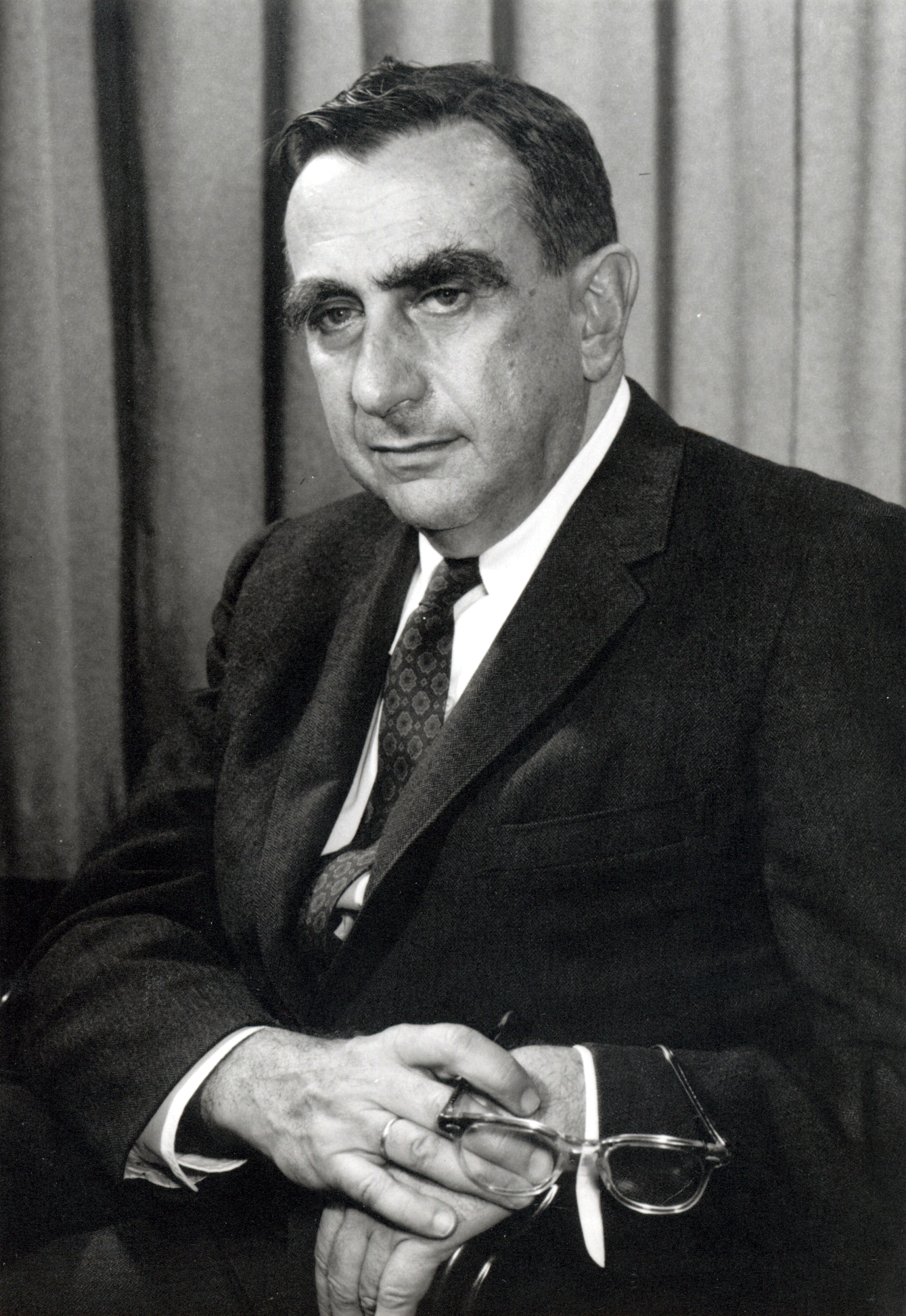
Teller testified about J. Robert Oppenheimer in 1954.

Teller became controversial in 1954 when he testified against Oppenheimer at Oppenheimer's security clearance hearing. Teller had clashed with Oppenheimer many times at Los Alamos over issues relating both to fission and fusion research, and, during Oppenheimer's hearing, he was the only member of the scientific community to state that Oppenheimer should not be granted security clearance. Asked at the hearing by Atomic Energy Commission (AEC) attorney Roger Robb whether he was planning "to suggest that Dr. Oppenheimer is disloyal to the United States", Teller replied that:

I do not want to suggest anything of the kind. I know Oppenheimer as an intellectually most alert and a very complicated person, and I think it would be presumptuous and wrong on my part if I would try in any way to analyze his motives. But I have always assumed, and I now assume that he is loyal to the United States. I believe this, and I shall believe it until I see very conclusive proof to the opposite.

He was immediately asked whether he believed that Oppenheimer was a "security risk", to which he testified:

In a great number of cases I have seen Dr. Oppenheimer act—I understood that Dr. Oppenheimer acted—in a way which for me was exceedingly hard to understand. I thoroughly disagreed with him in numerous issues and his actions frankly appeared to me confused and complicated. To this extent I feel that I would like to see the vital interests of this country in hands which I understand better, and therefore trust more. In this very limited sense I would like to express a feeling that I would feel personally more secure if public matters would rest in other hands.

Teller also testified that Oppenheimer's opinion about the thermonuclear program seemed to be based more on the scientific feasibility of the weapon than anything else. He additionally testified that Oppenheimer's direction of Los Alamos was "a very outstanding achievement" both as a scientist and an administrator, lauding his "very quick mind" and that he made "just a most wonderful and excellent director".

After this, however, he detailed ways in which he felt that Oppenheimer had hindered his efforts towards an active thermonuclear development program, and at length criticized Oppenheimer's decisions not to invest more work onto the question at different points in his career, saying: "If it is a question of wisdom and judgment, as demonstrated by actions since 1945, then I would say one would be wiser not to grant clearance."

By recasting a difference of judgment over the merits of the early work on the hydrogen bomb project into a matter of a security risk, Teller effectively damned Oppenheimer in a field where security was necessarily of paramount concern. Teller's testimony thereby rendered Oppenheimer vulnerable to charges by a Congressional aide that he was a Soviet spy, which destroyed Oppenheimer's career.

Oppenheimer's security clearance was revoked after the hearings. Most of Teller's former colleagues disapproved of his testimony, and he was ostracized by much of the scientific community. After the fact, Teller consistently denied that he was intending to damn Oppenheimer, and even claimed that he was attempting to exonerate him. However, documentary evidence has suggested that this was likely not the case. Six days before the testimony, Teller met with an AEC liaison officer and suggested "deepening the charges" in his testimony.

Teller always insisted that his testimony had not significantly harmed Oppenheimer. In 2002, Teller contended that Oppenheimer was "not destroyed" by the security hearing but "no longer asked to assist in policy matters". He claimed his words were an overreaction because he had only just learned of Oppenheimer's failure to immediately report an approach by Haakon Chevalier, who had approached Oppenheimer to help the Russians. Teller said that, in hindsight, he would have responded differently.

Historian Richard Rhodes said that in his opinion, it was already a foregone conclusion that Oppenheimer would have his security clearance revoked by then AEC chairman Lewis Strauss, regardless of Teller's testimony. However, as Teller's testimony was the most damning, he was singled out and blamed for the hearing's ruling, losing friends due to it, such as Robert Christy, who refused to shake his hand in one infamous incident. This was emblematic of his later treatment, which resulted in him being forced into the role of an outcast of the physics community, thus leaving him little choice but to align himself with industrialists.

== US government work and political advocacy ==
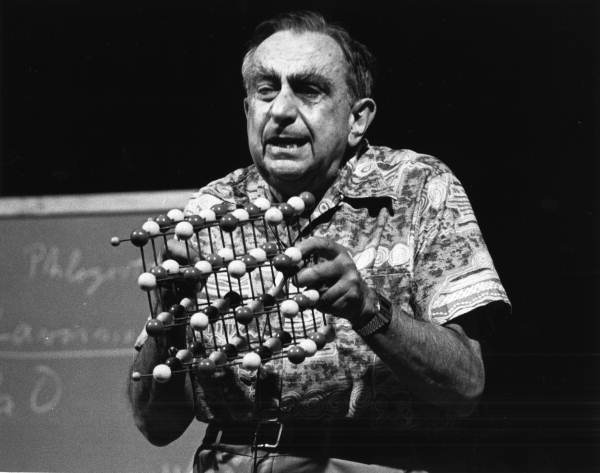
Teller lecturing at the Miami-Dade Community College (1979)

After the Oppenheimer controversy, Teller became ostracized by much of the scientific community, but was still quite welcome in the government and military science circles. Along with his traditional advocacy for nuclear energy development, a strong nuclear arsenal, and a vigorous nuclear testing program, he had helped to develop nuclear reactor safety standards as the chair of the Reactor Safeguard Committee to the AEC in the late 1940s, and in the late 1950s headed an effort at General Atomics which designed research reactors in which a nuclear meltdown would be impossible. The TRIGA (Training, Research, Isotopes, General Atomic) has been built and used in hundreds of hospitals and universities worldwide for medical isotope production and research.

Teller promoted increased defense spending to counter the perceived Soviet missile threat. He was a signatory to the 1958 report by the military sub-panel of the Rockefeller Brothers Fund (RFB) Special Studies Project, which called for a $3 billion annual increase in America's military budget.

In 1956, he attended the Project Nobska anti-submarine warfare conference, where discussion ranged from oceanography to nuclear weapons. In the course of discussing a small nuclear warhead for the Mark 45 torpedo, he started a discussion on the possibility of developing a physically small one-megaton nuclear warhead for the Polaris missile. His counterpart in the discussion, J. Carson Mark from the Los Alamos National Laboratory, at first insisted it could not be done. However, Mark eventually stated that a half-megaton warhead of small enough size could be developed. This yield, roughly thirty times that of the Hiroshima bomb, was enough for Chief of Naval Operations Admiral Arleigh Burke, who was present in person, and Navy strategic missile development shifted from Jupiter to Polaris by the end of the year.

He was Director of the Lawrence Livermore National Laboratory, which he helped to found with Ernest O. Lawrence, from 1958 to 1960, and after that he continued as an associate director. He chaired the committee that founded the Space Sciences Laboratory at Berkeley. He also served concurrently as a professor of physics at the University of California, Berkeley. He was a tireless advocate of a strong nuclear program and argued for continued testing and development—in fact, he stepped down from the directorship of Livermore so that he could better lobby against the proposed test ban. He testified against the test ban both before Congress as well as on television. Teller was involved with the Citizens Committee for a Free Cuba, an anti-Castro organisation formed in the 1960s.

Teller established the Department of Applied Science at the University of California, Davis and Lawrence Livermore National Laboratory in 1963, which holds the Edward Teller endowed professorship in his honor. In 1975 he retired from both the lab and Berkeley, and was named director emeritus of the Livermore Laboratory and appointed Senior Research Fellow at the Hoover Institution. Teller served on the Board of Directors of the Committee on the Present Danger, established in 1976, and in February 1982 he was appointed to President Reagan's "White House Science Council". After the end of communism in Hungary in 1989, he made several visits to his country of origin, and paid careful attention to the political changes there.

== Global climate change ==
Teller was one of the first prominent people to raise the danger of climate change, driven by the burning of fossil fuels. At an address to the membership of the American Chemical Society in December 1957, Teller warned that the large amount of carbon-based fuel that had been burnt since the mid-19th century was increasing the concentration of carbon dioxide in the atmosphere, which would "act in the same way as a greenhouse and will raise the temperature at the surface", and that he had calculated that if the concentration of carbon dioxide in the atmosphere increased by 10% "an appreciable part of the polar ice might melt".

In 1959, at a symposium organised by the American Petroleum Institute and the Columbia Graduate School of Business for the centennial of the American oil industry, Edward Teller warned that:

I am to talk to you about energy in the future. I will start by telling you why I believe that the energy resources of the past must be supplemented. ... And this, strangely, is the question of contaminating the atmosphere. ... Whenever you burn conventional fuel, you create carbon dioxide. ... Carbon dioxide has a strange property. It transmits visible light but it absorbs the infrared radiation which is emitted from the earth. Its presence in the atmosphere causes a greenhouse effect. ... It has been calculated that a temperature rise corresponding to a 10 per cent increase in carbon dioxide will be sufficient to melt the icecap and submerge New York. All the coastal cities would be covered, and since a considerable percentage of the human race lives in coastal regions, I think that this chemical contamination is more serious than most people tend to believe.

== Non-military uses of nuclear explosions ==
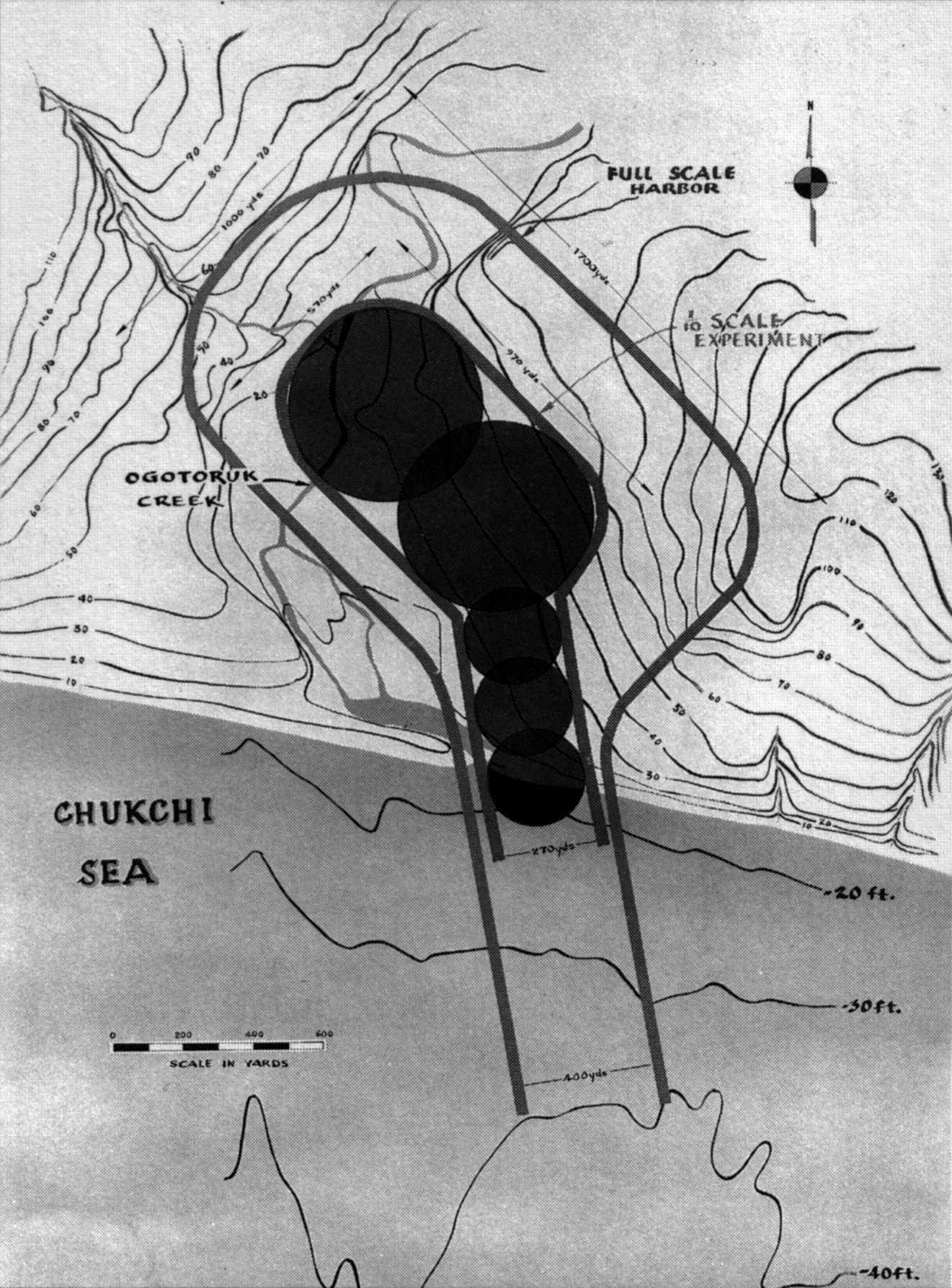
One of the Chariot schemes involved chaining five thermonuclear devices to create the artificial harbor.

Teller was one of the strongest and best-known advocates for investigating non-military uses of nuclear explosives, which the United States explored under Operation Plowshare. One of the most controversial projects he proposed was a plan to use a multi-megaton hydrogen bomb to dig a deep-water harbor more than a mile long and half a mile wide to use for the shipment of resources from coal and oil fields through Point Hope, Alaska. The Atomic Energy Commission accepted Teller's proposal in 1958, and it was designated Project Chariot. While the AEC was scouting out the Alaskan site and having withdrawn the land from the public domain, Teller publicly advocated the economic benefits of the plan, but was unable to convince local government leaders that the plan was financially viable.

Other scientists criticized the project as being potentially unsafe for the local wildlife and the Inupiat people living near the designated area, who were not officially told of the plan until March 1960. Additionally, it turned out that the harbor would be ice-bound for nine months out of the year. In the end, due to the financial infeasibility of the project and the concerns over radiation-related health issues, the project was abandoned in 1962.

A related experiment, which also had Teller's endorsement, was a plan to extract oil from the tar sands in northern Alberta with nuclear explosions, titled Project Oilsands. The plan actually received the endorsement of the Alberta government, but was rejected by the Government of Canada under Prime Minister John Diefenbaker, who was opposed to having any nuclear weapons in Canada. After Diefenbaker was out of office, Canada went on to have nuclear weapons, from a US nuclear sharing agreement, from 1963 to 1984.

Teller also proposed the use of nuclear bombs to prevent damage from powerful hurricanes. He argued that when conditions in the Atlantic Ocean are right for the formation of hurricanes, the heat generated by well-placed nuclear explosions could trigger several small hurricanes, rather than waiting for nature to build one large one.

== Nuclear technology and Israel ==
For some twenty years, Teller advised Israel on nuclear matters in general, and on the building of a hydrogen bomb in particular. In 1952, Teller and Oppenheimer had a long meeting with David Ben-Gurion in Tel Aviv, telling him that the best way to accumulate plutonium was to burn natural uranium in a nuclear reactor. Starting in 1964, a connection between Teller and Israel was made by the physicist Yuval Ne'eman, who had similar political views. Between 1964 and 1967, Teller visited Israel six times, lecturing at Tel Aviv University, and advising the chiefs of Israel's scientific-security circle as well as prime ministers and cabinet members.

In 1967, when the Israeli nuclear program was nearing completion, Teller informed Neeman that he was going to tell the CIA that Israel had built nuclear weapons, and explain that it was justified by the background of the Six-Day War. After Neeman cleared it with Prime Minister Levi Eshkol, Teller briefed the head of the CIA's Office of Science and Technology, Carl Duckett. It took a year for Teller to convince the CIA that Israel had obtained nuclear capability; the information then went through CIA Director Richard Helms to the president at that time, Lyndon B. Johnson. Teller also persuaded them to end the American attempts to inspect the Negev Nuclear Research Center in Dimona. In 1976, Duckett testified in Congress before the Nuclear Regulatory Commission that, after receiving information from an "American scientist", he drafted a National Intelligence Estimate on Israel's nuclear capability.

In the 1980s, Teller again visited Israel to advise the Israeli government on building a nuclear reactor. Three decades later, Teller confirmed that it was during his visits that he concluded that Israel had nuclear weapons. After conveying the matter to the US government, Teller reportedly said: "They [Israel] have it, and they were clever enough to trust their research and not to test, they know that to test would get them into trouble."

== Three Mile Island ==
Teller had a heart attack in 1979, and blamed it on Jane Fonda, who had starred in The China Syndrome, which depicted a fictional reactor accident and was released less than two weeks before the Three Mile Island accident. She spoke out against nuclear power while promoting the film. After the accident, Teller acted quickly to lobby in defense of nuclear energy, testifying to its safety and reliability, and soon after one flurry of activity, he suffered the attack. He signed a two-page-spread ad in the July 31, 1979, issue of The Washington Post with the headline "I was the only victim of Three-Mile Island". It opened with:

On May 7, a few weeks after the accident at Three-Mile Island, I was in Washington. I was there to refute some of that propaganda that Ralph Nader, Jane Fonda and their kind are spewing to the news media in their attempt to frighten people away from nuclear power. I am 71 years old, and I was working 20 hours a day. The strain was too much. The next day, I suffered a heart attack. You might say that I was the only one whose health was affected by that reactor near Harrisburg. No, that would be wrong. It was not the reactor. It was Jane Fonda. Reactors are not dangerous.

== Strategic Defense Initiative ==
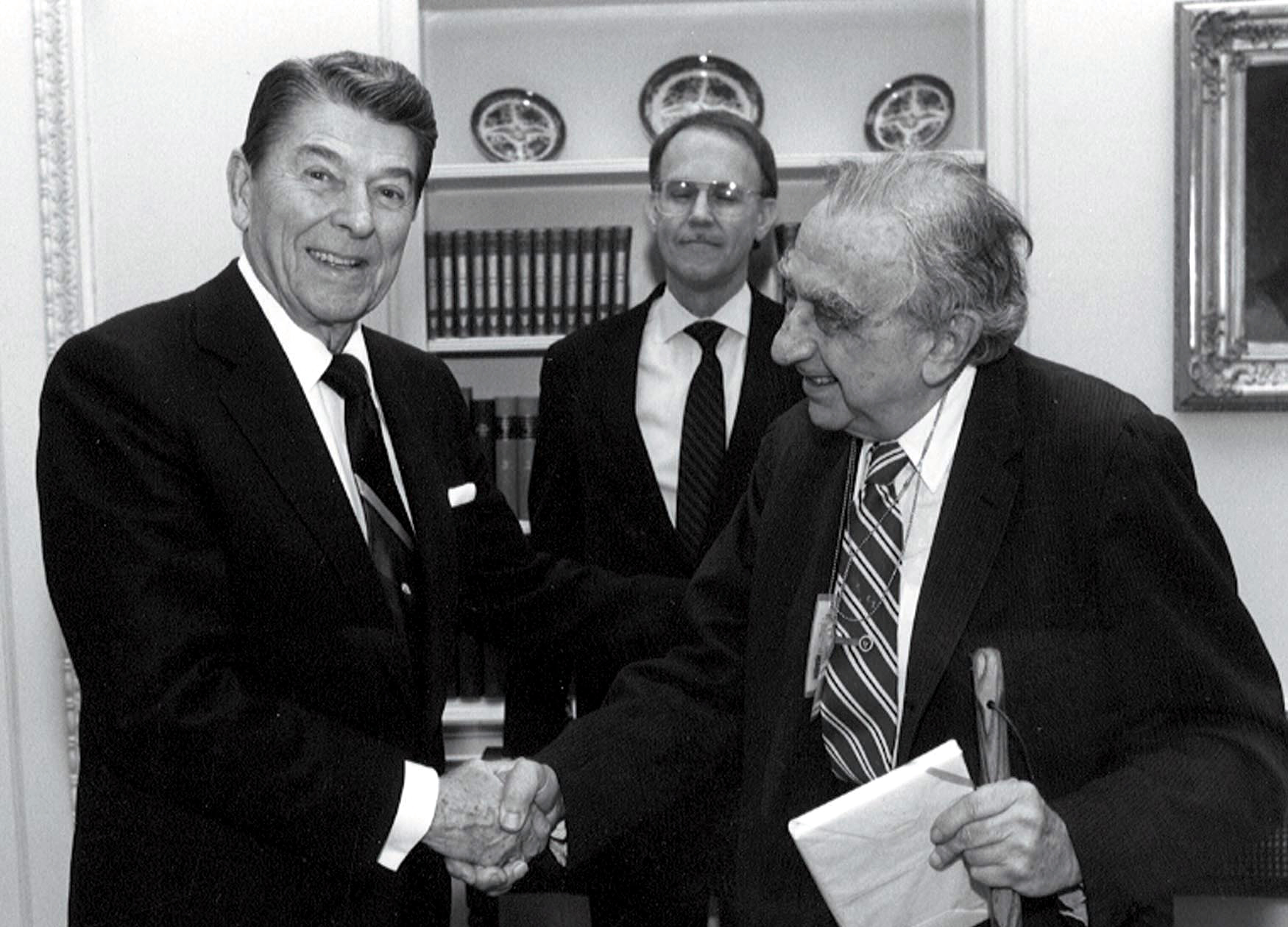
Teller became a major lobbying force of the Strategic Defense Initiative to President Ronald Reagan in the 1980s.

In the 1980s, Teller began a strong campaign for what was later called the Strategic Defense Initiative (SDI), derided by critics as "Star Wars", the concept of using ground and satellite-based lasers, particle beams, and missiles to destroy incoming Soviet ICBMs. Teller lobbied with government agencies—and got the approval of President Ronald Reagan—for a plan to develop a system using elaborate satellites which used atomic weapons to fire X-ray lasers at incoming missiles—as part of a broader scientific research program into defenses against nuclear weapons.

Scandal erupted when Teller (and his associate Lowell Wood) was accused of deliberately overselling the program and perhaps encouraging the dismissal of a laboratory director (Roy Woodruff) who had attempted to correct the error. His claims led to a joke which circulated in the scientific community, that a new unit of unfounded optimism was designated as the teller; one teller was so large that most events had to be measured in nanotellers or picotellers.

Many prominent scientists argued that the system was futile. Hans Bethe, along with IBM physicist Richard Garwin and Cornell University colleague Kurt Gottfried, wrote an article in Scientific American which analyzed the system and concluded that any putative enemy could disable such a system by the use of suitable decoys that would cost a very small fraction of the SDI program.

In 1987, Teller published a book entitled Better a Shield than a Sword, which supported civil defense and active protection systems. His views on the role of lasers in SDI were published and are available in two 1986–87 laser conference proceedings.

== Asteroid impact avoidance ==
Following the 1994 Shoemaker-Levy 9 comet impacts with Jupiter, Teller proposed to a collective of US and Russian ex-Cold War weapons designers in a 1995 planetary defense workshop at Lawrence Livermore National Laboratory, that they collaborate to design a 1 gigaton nuclear explosive device, which would be equivalent to the kinetic energy of a 1 km diameter asteroid. In order to safeguard the earth, the theoretical 1 Gt device would weigh about 25–30 tons—light enough to be lifted on the Russian Energia rocket—and could be used to instantaneously vaporize a 1 km asteroid, or divert the paths of extinction event class asteroids (greater than 10 km in diameter) with a few months' notice; with 1-year notice, at an interception location no closer than Jupiter, it would also be capable of dealing with the even rarer short period comets which can come out of the Kuiper belt and transit past Earth orbit within 2 years. For comets of this class, with a maximum estimated 100 km diameter, Charon served as the hypothetical threat.

== Death and legacy ==
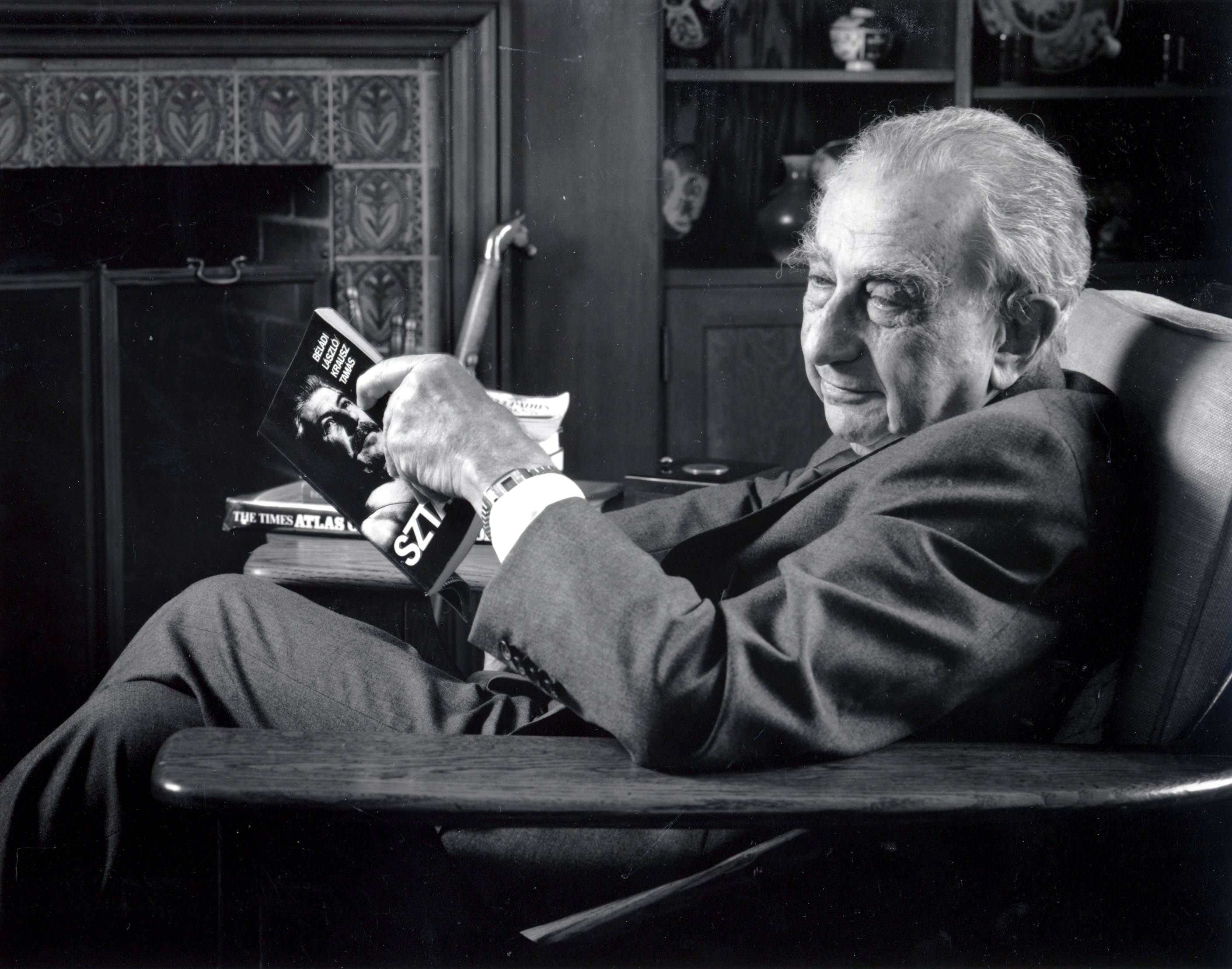
Edward Teller in his later years

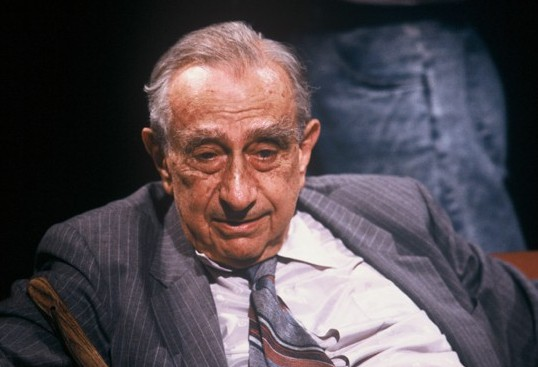
Appearing on British television discussion After Dark in 1987

Teller died in Stanford, California on September 9, 2003, at the age of 95. He had suffered a stroke two days before and had long been experiencing several conditions related to his advanced age.

Teller's vigorous advocacy for strength through nuclear weapons, especially when so many of his wartime colleagues later expressed regret about the arms race, made him an easy target for the "mad scientist" stereotype. In 1991, he was awarded one of the first Ig Nobel Prizes for Peace in recognition of his "lifelong efforts to change the meaning of peace as we know it". He was also rumored to be one of the inspirations for the character of Dr. Strangelove in Stanley Kubrick's 1964 satirical film of the same name. In the aforementioned Scientific American interview from 1999, he was reported as having bristled at the question: "My name is not Strangelove. I don't know about Strangelove. I'm not interested in Strangelove. What else can I say? ... Look. Say it three times more and I throw you out of this office."

Nobel Prize-winning physicist Isidor I. Rabi once suggested that "It would have been a better world without Teller."

In 1981, Teller became a founding member of the World Cultural Council. A wish for his 100th birthday, made around the time of his 90th, was for Lawrence Livermore's scientists to give him "excellent predictions—calculations and experiments—about the interiors of the planets".

In 1986, he was awarded the United States Military Academy's Sylvanus Thayer Award. He was elected a member of the US National Academy of Sciences in 1948. He was a fellow of the American Academy of Arts and Sciences, the American Association for the Advancement of Science, the American Nuclear Society, and the American Physical Society. Among the honors he received were the Albert Einstein Award in 1958, the Golden Plate Award of the American Academy of Achievement in 1961, the Enrico Fermi Award in 1962, the Herzl Prize in 1978, the Eringen Medal in 1980, the Harvey Prize in 1975, the National Medal of Science in 1983, the Presidential Citizens Medal in 1989, and the Corvin Chain in 2001. He was also named as part of the group of "US Scientists" who were Time magazine's People of the Year in 1960, and an asteroid, 5006 Teller, is named after him. He was awarded the Presidential Medal of Freedom by President George W. Bush in 2003, less than two months before his death.

His final paper, published posthumously, advocated the construction of a prototype liquid fluoride thorium reactor. The genesis and impetus for this last paper was recounted by the co-author Ralph Moir in 2007.

Teller was portrayed by David Suchet in the 1980 TV miniseries Oppenheimer, by Miki Manojlović in the 1987 TV miniseries Race for the Bomb, and by Benny Safdie in the 2023 biopic film Oppenheimer.

== Publications ==
- Our Nuclear Future; Facts, Dangers, and Opportunities (1958), with Albert L. Latter as co-author
- Basic Concepts of Physics (1960)
- The Legacy of Hiroshima (1962), with Allen Brown
- The Constructive Uses of Nuclear Explosions (1968)
- Energy from Heaven and Earth (1979)
- The Pursuit of Simplicity (1980)
- Better a Shield Than a Sword: Perspectives on Defense and Technology (1987)
- Conversations on the Dark Secrets of Physics (1991), with Wendy Teller and Wilson Talley ISBN 978-0306437724
- Memoirs: A Twentieth-Century Journey in Science and Politics. Cambridge, MA: Perseus Publishing. 2001 – via Internet Archive., with Judith Shoolery

== See also ==
- List of Ig Nobel Prize winners
