= Maniac =

Maniac (from Greek μανιακός, maniakos) is a pejorative for an individual who experiences the mood known as mania. In common usage, it is also an insult for someone involved in reckless behavior.

Maniac may also refer to:

== Computer ==
- MANIAC I, an early computer
- MANIAC II, an early computer
- MANIAC III, an early computer

== Film ==
- Maniac (1934 film), an exploitation film directed by Dwain Esper
- Maniac (1963 film), directed by Michael Carreras
- The Ransom (aka Maniac!), 1977 film with Oliver Reed
- Maniac (1980 film), directed by William Lustig and starring Joe Spinell
- Maniac (2011 film), directed by Shia LaBeouf
- Maniac (2012 film), featuring Elijah Wood

== Games ==
- Ideal Maniac, a handheld electronic LED game created by the Ideal Toy Company
- Maniac Mansion, a point and click comedy-horror game by Lucasfilm games

== Literature ==
- Maniac, a 1995 novel by John Peel
- The MANIAC, 2023 novel by Benjamin Labatut
- Maniac Magee, a 1990 novel by Jerry Spinelli

== Medicine ==
- Melanocytic nevus with intraepidermal ascent of cells

== Music ==
- Maniac (producer), grime producer from London
- Stage name of Norwegian musician Sven Erik Kristiansen
- Maniac (band), a band from Los Angeles, California, US

=== Songs ===
- "Maniac" (Michael Sembello song), used in the 1983 film Flashdance
- ”Maniac 2000”, a 2000 Irish dance track
- "Maniac" (Girlicious song), a 2010 song
- "Maniac" (Conan Gray song), a 2019 song
- "Maniac" (Stray Kids song), a 2022 song
- "Maniac" (Macklemore song), a 2022 song
- "Maniac", by Viviz from their extended play Versus
- "Maniac", by Clap Your Hands Say Yeah from their album Hysterical
- "Maniac", by Jhené Aiko
- "Maniac", by Kid Cudi from his album Man on the Moon II: The Legend of Mr. Rager
- "Maniac", by Merrill Nisker from her album Fancypants Hoodlum
- "Maniac", by Caravan Palace from their album Panic
- "Maniac", by Carpenter Brut featuring Yann Ligner

== Sports ==
- Maryland Maniacs, a United States indoor football team
- "Maniac" Mike Davis (1956–2001), American professional wrestler
- "Maniac" Jimmy Deo, a professional wrestler; one half of the tag-team Assault and Battery
- The Maniacs, Ultras group of FK Željezničar Sarajevo
- Shaquille Leonard (born 1995), American football player

== Television ==
- Maniac (Norwegian TV series), a Norwegian television series
- Maniac (miniseries), an American TV series based on the Norwegian series

== See also ==
- Mania (disambiguation)
- Maniacal (disambiguation)
- Manniac, a 2005 film directed by Ingo Trendelbernd
