= John Pasta =

American physicist (1918–1981)

- Born: October 22, 1918; New York City, U.S.
- Died: June 5, 1981 (aged 62); Washington, D.C., U.S.
- Education: New York University
- Known for: Co-originating the Fermi–Pasta–Ulam–Tsingou experiment at the Los Alamos National Laboratory
- Scientific career
- Fields: Computational physics
- Workplaces: Department of Computer Science at the University of Illinois at Urbana-Champaign

John Robert Pasta (October 22, 1918 – June 5, 1981) was an American computational physicist and computer scientist who is remembered today for the Fermi–Pasta–Ulam–Tsingou experiment, the result of which was much discussed among physicists and researchers in the fields of dynamical systems and chaos theory. He was the head of the department of Computer Science at the University of Illinois at Urbana-Champaign from 1964 to 1970.

== Early life ==
Pasta was born in New York City in 1918, the eldest of four children, and grew up in Queens. He attended the New York public schools.

He became interested in physics at an early age when an uncle gave him some of his old college books. After graduating from Townsend Harris High School, he entered City College of New York in 1935 and completed three years. The Depression forced him to drop out and to take a job as a real estate title examiner. In August 1941, he became a patrolman for the New York City Police Department. In 1942, he was drafted into the US Army, became an officer in the Signal Corps, and took courses on electronics and radar at Harvard and MIT.

He married Betty Ann Bentzen at the Little Church Around the Corner in New York City in May 1943.

During World War II, Pasta served in Europe, mostly as cryptographical security officer and radar officer, for which he was awarded the Bronze Star and the Belgian Fourragère. After being discharged in 1946, he took advantage of the G.I. Bill to finish his undergraduate work at City College that same year and enter graduate school at New York University to study mathematics and physics. As a graduate student he became a research fellow in the department of physics at Brookhaven National Laboratory, and completed his thesis on "Limiting Procedures in Quantum Electrodynamics" in 1951 under the guidance of Hartland Snyder. He became a staff member of the Los Alamos Laboratory in August 1951.

== 1951–1963 ==
At Los Alamos National Laboratory, Pasta began his work on his most famous projects.

In 1952, working under Nicholas Metropolis on the MANIAC I, Pasta aided in the construction of an early computer that specialized in calculations around weapons design.

After working on the MANIAC I, he continued on to work in the project he is most known for, the Fermi–Pasta–Ulam–Tsingou problem.

After working alongside Enrico Fermi, Stanislaw Ulam, and Mary Tsingou, Pasta went on to work for the Atomic Energy Commission as the only computer expert, eventually developing the branch of mathematics and computers to an entire division.

== 1964–1981 ==
In 1964, Pasta became a research professor of physics at the Department of Computer Science at the University of Illinois, and later became the head of the department.

He died in 1981, in Washington, DC.
