= Marjorie Devaney =

American mathematician, electrical engineer, and computer scientist

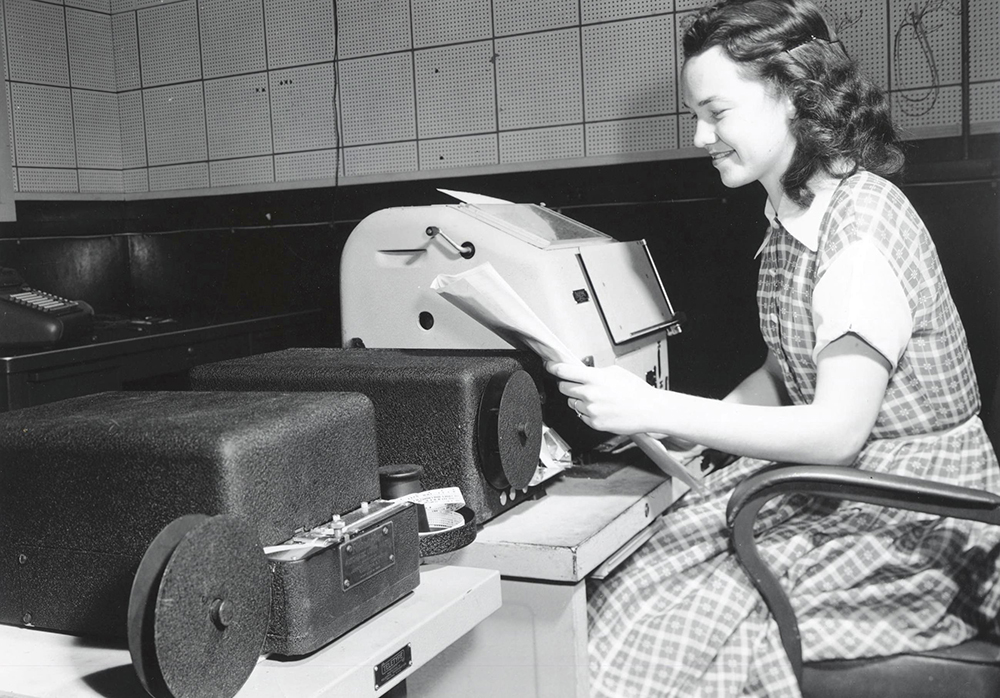
- Devaney punching a program for the MANIAC, 1952
- Born: Marjorie Ann Jones; March 3, 1931; Bell, California, US
- Died: September 20, 2007 (aged 76); Los Alamos, New Mexico, US
- Resting place: Guaje Pines Cemetery, Los Alamos, New Mexico, US
- Education: University of New Mexico–Los Alamos
- Spouse: Joseph Devaney

Marjorie Ann "Marge" Jones Devaney (March 3, 1931 – September 20, 2007) was an American mathematician, electrical engineer, and computer scientist who assisted in the development of the MANIAC I (Mathematical Analyzer Numerical Integrator And Computer) computer in 1951 as a member of the Theoretical Division at the Los Alamos National Laboratory, making her one of world's earliest computer programmers.

== Life and education ==
Marjorie Jones was the child of farmers from Wisconsin who lost their money and possessions in the Wall Street Crash of 1929. Soon after, her family relocated to California where her father had a job arranged as a gravestone manufacturer. She was born in Bell, California, in March 1931, making her the youngest of three children (one brother and one sister).

At age four, her family moved to Pomona, California where Jones spent her childhood years and graduated high school. She started her college education at the University of Denver in September 1948, and graduated in August 1951 with a bachelor's degree in mathematics. In the early 1970s, she began post-graduate studies at the University of New Mexico–Los Alamos (UNMLA). She completed graduate school with a master's degree in computer science and electrical engineering. Jones married Joseph James Devaney, and together they had one daughter. Devaney died in Los Alamos, New Mexico on September 20, 2007.

== Career ==
Marjorie Devaney began her career on October 8, 1951, at the Los Alamos National Laboratory in Los Alamos, New Mexico. She joined the MANIAC I program as a member of the Theoretical Division under the leadership of Nicholas Metropolis and Jack Johnson. The Theoretical Division eventually became the Computing Division, where she worked for forty years. She retired in 1991 having made a number of contributions to the MANIAC I and MANIAC II programs. Her most notable work includes the co-creation of a central file system (CFS) used at the laboratory in Los Alamos, a task which took more than a decade to complete. Devaney wrote and co-wrote several publications primarily related to mathematics and programming. Additionally, Devaney's work is referenced in numerous, independent publications.

== Publications ==
- Devaney, Marjorie, and Jeanne Hudgins. "The Terminal Control Language for the Madcap Programming Language." ACM SIGPLAN Notices 7, no. 10 (1972): 130–36.
- Richtmyer, R., Devaney, M., and Metropolis, N. "Continued Fraction Expansions of Algebraic Numbers." Numerische Mathematik 4, no. 1 (1962): 68–84.
- Devaney, Joseph J., Leona O. Bordwell, and Marjorie J. Devaney. Hafnium Cross Sections and Their Temperature Dependence. Los Alamos, NM: Los Alamos Scientific Laboratory of the University of California, 1962.
- Bordwell, Lee, Joseph J. Devaney, Marjorie Devaney, Bertha Fagan, and Max Goldstein. TEWA: An IBM Code for Computing the Maxwellian Doppler Broadening of Breit-Wigner Resonances. Los Alamos, NM: Los Alamos Scientific Laboratory of the University of California, 1964.
