= Make You Mad =

Make You Mad may refer to:

- "Make You Mad", song by Odds from Nest
- "Make You Mad", song by Fifth Harmony from Fifth Harmony
- "Make You Mad", song by Becca from Alive
- "What've I Done (To Make You Mad)", song by Linda Jones
