= Stars in Stereo =

American rock band

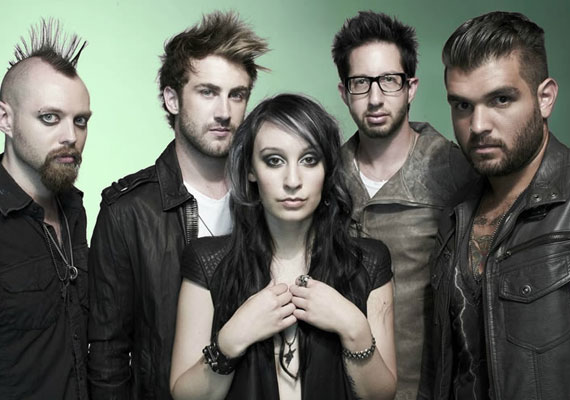

Background information
- Origin: Los Angeles, California
- Genres: Alternative rock
- Years active: 2011–2015
- Label: Hundred Handed Inc.
- Members: Bec Hollcraft; Jordan McGraw; Ryan "Frogs" McCormack; Drew Langan; Justin Siegel (left 2013)
- Website: starsinstereo.com (down)

Stars in Stereo was an American alternative rock band formed in Los Angeles, California in 2011, fronted by American singer, songwriter, and guitarist Rebecca "BECCA" Emily Hollcraft. The band also featured guitarist Jordan McGraw, drummer Drew Langan, rhythm guitarist Ryan "Frogs" McCormack, and bassist Justin Siegel until 2013, when Frogs replaced Justin Siegel on bass, who left to pursue other interests. The band came together after McGraw, McCormack, Langan, and Justin Siegel's band, City (Comma) State, broke up. The group released their eponymous debut album, Stars in Stereo, on April 9, 2013, and their subsequent album, Leave Your Mark, on June 17, 2014, through their own indie record label, Hundred Handed Inc.

== History ==
=== Formation ===
Jordan McGraw described the formation of Stars in Stereo in detail in an interview with Rock Revolt Magazine.

Before that date (June 6, 2011), the other four dudes in the band had been making music in another band (City (Comma) State) and we decided to take that apart. It wasn't exactly what we wanted, so we started to write individually. We were still friends and still hanging out and we started to hear each others stuff and it sounded similar. We decided that everyone was a good fit to start on another project and we started to search for a voice, a front woman. We found Bec and she was absolutely perfect. Literally, two days after we met, we went into the studio and started writing music together and doing the whole thing.

In the same interview, Becca replies with her side of the story.

I was signed to Sony Japan before meeting these guys and my contract had just ended earlier that year. I had never been in a band before and I was open to just about anything. I was contacted by a friend who told me that they were looking for a singer, so I decided to go meet them and sing for them and see what happened. I wasn't expecting this at all! We all ended up having the same vision and things just really worked out amazingly.

=== Stars in Stereo EP (2011–2012) ===
Almost immediately after Becca was selected to be the front woman of Stars in Stereo, the band began work on their first album. "Every Last Thing" was the first song the band wrote together, which would become the band's first official single and music video. The songs "The Broken", "Violence", and "Red Eyed Romance" soon followed, which were released on the Stars in Stereo EP on October 2, 2012. "The Broken" was chosen as the band's second official single, which also would later feature in a music video. The band toured for the remainder of 2012 after releasing their eponymous EP, opening for acts such as Foxy Shazam, Maniac, Blue October, Empires, The Used, Dead Sara, and P.O.D.

=== Stars in Stereo album (2013) ===
Stars in Stereo kicked off their 2013 tour opening for acts Flyleaf and Drowning Pool during February and March with material from their upcoming album and a few covers, including Aerosmith's "Dream On" and Nine Inch Nails' "Closer". The band's eponymous debut album Stars in Stereo was released April 9 and featured six new songs and a few bonus songs, including an alternate version of the single "Every Last Thing" and an online link to the song "Night by Night" under the CD. The song "Half Life" was also recorded, but released separate from the album. Between April and May, the band also opened for acts Halestorm, Bullet for My Valentine, and Young Guns supporting their new album. For the rest of the 2013 year, Stars in Stereo toured with acts Anberlin, Campfire OK, P.O.D., Flyleaf, Bullet for My Valentine, Throw the Fight, Black Veil Brides, Halestorm, and Redlight King.

=== Leave Your Mark Album (2014) ===
The album Leave Your Mark was recorded during Q1 of 2014 and released on June 17, including eleven new songs and featuring the singles "Leave Your Mark" and "Fair-weathered Friend". The song "Leave Your Mark" dealt with the topic of erotic gratification and received its own music video, considered to be NSFW by many. The band spent the second half of 2014 touring with a number of various acts, including Young Guns, You Me at Six, and Alien Ant Farm.

=== Disbanding (2015) ===
The band spent the first half of 2015 opening for acts Bush and Theory of a Deadman and finished their tour by opening for multiple popular acts such as Crown the Empire, Three Days Grace, Pop Evil, Korn, Marilyn Manson, Rise Against, Papa Roach, Cheap Trick, Chevelle, and Of Mice and Men in early May. On June 1, it was stated the Stars in Stereo had disbanded. In 2016, McGraw and Langan joined forces with Matt Black (bass guitar) to form the new pop band Hundred Handed and Becca moved on to join the Game of Thrones era musical project Blackhaven Music.

== Musical style ==
Stars in Stereo have been most often described as an alternative rock band. In an interview, Jordan McGraw claimed that the band had an array of really different influences, including U2, Foo Fighters, Daft Punk, and Blink-182. In the same interview, Becca also said she took influences from 30 Seconds to Mars and 80s bands. The band's first studio album mostly uses sounds of alternative rock blended with elements of pop music and electronic influences. Their follow-up album displays a heavier, hard rock influence.

== Band members ==
- Bec Hollcraft – lead vocals, rhythm guitar (2011-2015)
- Jordan McGraw – lead guitar, acoustic guitar, piano (2011-2015)
- Ryan "Frogs" McCormack – rhythm guitar (2011-2013), bass guitar (2013-2015)
- Drew Langan – drums, percussion (2011-2015)
- Justin Siegel – bass guitar (2011-2013)

== Discography ==
=== EPs ===
- Stars in Stereo (2012)

=== Studio albums ===
- Stars in Stereo (2013)
- Leave Your Mark (2014)
