= Turgay Uzer =

Turkish-American physicist

Ahmet Turgay Uzer
- Born: February 1, 1952 (age 74); Samsun, Turkey
- Education: Middle East Technical University (BS); Harvard University (PhD)
- Known for: Nonlinear dynamics and chaos in classical mechanics and semiclassical mechanics applied to atomic systems, maya scripts and anthropology
- Scientific career
- Fields: Physics, chemistry, applied mathematics, linguistics, anthropology
- Workplaces: University of Oxford; California Institute of Technology; University of Colorado; Georgia Institute of Technology

Ahmet Turgay Uzer is a Turkish-born American theoretical physicist, nature photographer for wild animals and linguist specializing in Yuri Knorosov's Maya scripts. One of the early pioneers for the quantum laboratory frame transformations for small molecules intermediate range interactions.

Regents' Professor Emeritus at Georgia Institute of Technology following Joseph Ford (physicist). He has contributed in the field of atomic and molecular physics, nonlinear dynamics and chaos significantly. His research on interplay between quantum dynamics and classical mechanics, in the context of chaos is considered to be novel in molecular and theoretical physics and chemistry.

Early 2000s, his interest in complexity of Human language scripts and anthropological complexity lead to studies in Maya Code and scripts.. Along these lines, Ben Finney's works was quite influential for him to study Maya and SETI. He is also interested in the anthropology of oil wrestling and other ancient olympic and modern inceptions, such as Power Slap within UFC family.

== Academic career ==
Turgay Uzer completed his bachelor's degree at Turkey's prestigious Middle East Technical University. According to Harvard University Library his doctoral thesis was entitled "Photon and Electron Interactions with Diatomic Molecules." He defended his dissertation and graduated from Harvard University in 1979.

Before joining Georgia Tech in 1985 as an associate professor, he worked as a research fellow at University of Oxford 1979/81, Caltech 1982-1983, and as a research associate at University of Colorado 1983/85. Currently, he is a faculty member with the Center for Nonlinear Science and full professor of physics at Georgia Tech.

His research areas are quite broad, but he has focused on the dynamics of intermolecular energy transfer, reaction dynamics, quantal manifestations of classical mechanics, quantization of nonlinear systems, computational physics, molecular physics, applied mathematics.

== Awards ==
Uzer was Alexander von Humboldt-Stiftung Foundation Fellow in 1993–1994 at Max Planck Institute, Munich.

Uzer is of Turkish origin and was also awarded the prestigious Science award for his contributions to physics from the Scientific and Technological Research Council (TÜBİTAK) in 1998.

== Selected publications ==
=== Books ===
- The Physics and Chemistry of Wave Packets, with John Yeazell at books.google
- Lecture Notes on Atomic and Molecular Physics with Şakir Erkoç at books.google

=== Some of the seminal papers ===
Uzer has more than 80 referenced Journal articles, in a number of highly respected scientific journals.

- Appeared in PRE Chaotic billiards with neutral boundaries
- Appeared in Science Celestial Mechanics on a Microscopic Scale
- Appeared in JCP Quantization with operators appropriate to shapes of trajectories and classical perturbation theory
