= Los Alamos chess =

Chess variant played on a 6×6 board without bishops

	a	b	c	d	e	f
6	a6 black rook	b6 black knight	c6 black queen	d6 black king	e6 black knight	f6 black rook	6
5	a5 black pawn	b5 black pawn	c5 black pawn	d5 black pawn	e5 black pawn	f5 black pawn	5
4	a4	b4	c4	d4	e4	f4	4
3	a3	b3	c3	d3	e3	f3	3
2	a2 white pawn	b2 white pawn	c2 white pawn	d2 white pawn	e2 white pawn	f2 white pawn	2
1	a1 white rook	b1 white knight	c1 white queen	d1 white king	e1 white knight	f1 white rook	1
	a	b	c	d	e	f

Los Alamos chess setup

Los Alamos chess (or anti-clerical chess) is a chess variant played on a 6×6 board without bishops. This was the first chess-like game played by a digital computer program. This program was written at Los Alamos Scientific Laboratory by Paul Stein and Mark Wells for the MANIAC I computer in 1956. The reduction of the board size and the number of pieces from standard chess was due to the very limited capacity of computers at the time. The computer still needed about 20 minutes to compute a move.

The program was very simple, containing only about 600 instructions. It was mostly a minimax tree search and could look four plies ahead. For scoring the board at the end of the four-ply lookahead, it estimates a score for material and a score for mobility, then adds them. Pseudocode for the chess program is described in Figure 11.4 of Newell, 2019. In 1958, a revised version was written for MANIAC II for full 8×8 chess, though its pseudocode was never published. There is a record of a single game by it, c. November 1958 (Table 11.2 of Newell, 2019). According to a 2023 study by Roger Sayle, Los Alamos chess has about 4*10^29 possible positions, and a branching factor of about 22. This makes it considerably simpler than standard chess (possible positions: ~8.7*10^45, branching factor: 35), but still more complex that games like checkers and Othello/Reversi, which have been weakly solved.

== Game rules ==
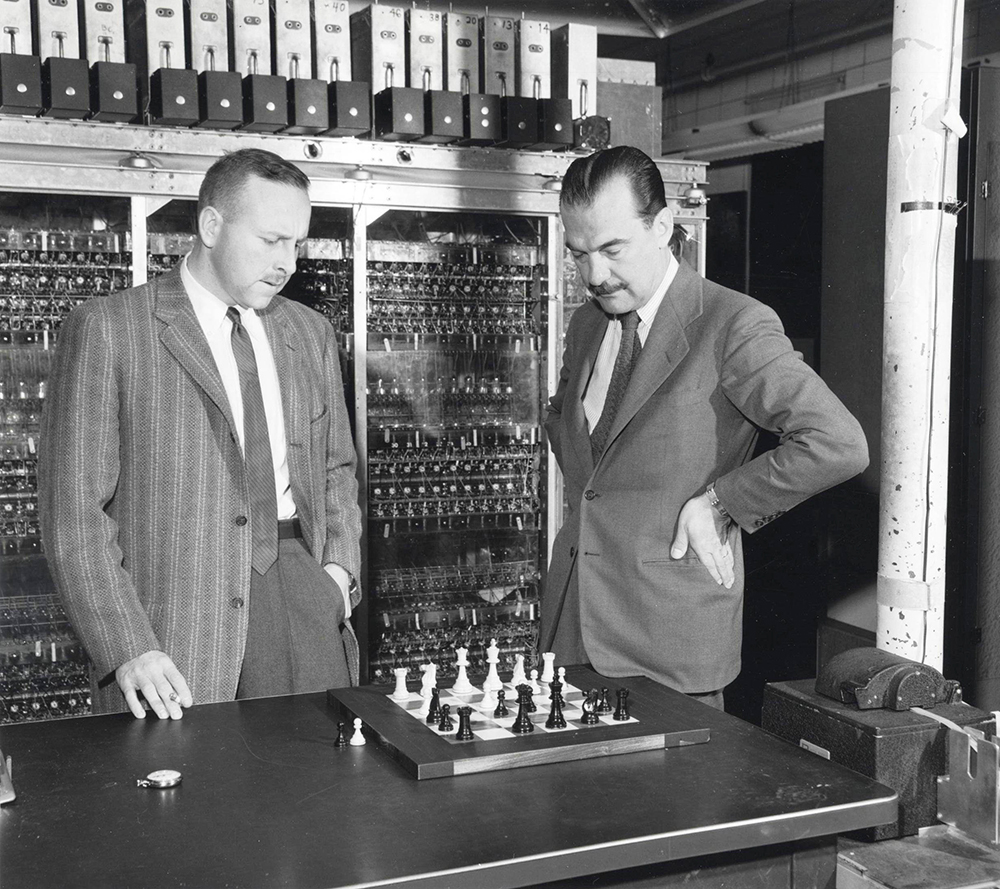
Paul Stein and Nicholas Metropolis play Los Alamos chess against the MANIAC.

The starting position is illustrated. All rules are as in chess except:

- There is no pawn double-step move, nor is there the en passant capture;
- Pawns may not be promoted to bishops;
- There is no castling.

== Los Alamos trials ==
The computer played three games. The first was played against itself. The second one was against a strong human player, who played without a queen. The human player won. In the third game, MANIAC I played against a laboratory assistant who had been taught the rules of chess in the preceding week specifically for the game. The computer won, marking the first time that a computer had beaten a human player in a chess-like game.

=== The second game ===
	a	b	c	d	e	f
6	a6 black rook	b6 black knight	c6 black queen	d6 black king	e6 black knight	f6 black rook	6
5	a5 black pawn	b5 black pawn	c5 black pawn	d5 black pawn	e5 black pawn	f5 black pawn	5
4	a4	b4	c4	d4	e4	f4	4
3	a3	b3	c3	d3 white pawn	e3	f3	3
2	a2 white pawn	b2 white pawn	c2 white pawn	d2	e2 white pawn	f2 white pawn	2
1	a1 white rook	b1 white knight	c1	d1 white king	e1 white knight	f1 white rook	1
	a	b	c	d	e	f

Game II after opening move. White plays without a queen.

White: Martin Kruskal Black: MANIAC I
1.d3 Na4 2.b3 Nb6 3.c3 d4 4.c4 bxc4 5.dxc4 a4 6.Na3 e4 7.Kd2 Ke5 8.f3 e3+ 9.Kc2 axb3+ 10.axb3 Nf4 11.Nd3+ Nxd3 12.Kxd3 Kf4 13.Kc2 Ra5 14.Kb2 Re6 15.Rfd1 Re5 16.Nc2 Rxa1 17.Kxa1 Re6 18.Kb2 Re5 19.Ne1 Qe4 20.fxe4 fxe4 21.Kc2 d3+ 22.exd3 e2 23.Ra1 Re6 24.Ra5 exd3+ 25.Kd2 Re4 26.Rxc5 Re6 27.Nxd3+ Ke4 28.Kxe2 Kd4+ 29.Re5 Rxe5+ 30.Nxe5 Kc5 31.Kd3 Kb4 32.Kd4 Nxc4 33.bxc4 Kb3 34.c5 Kb4 35.c6=Q Kb3 36.Nd3 Ka2 37.Qc3 Kb1 38.Qb2# 1–0

According to a 2023 study by Roger Sayle, Black could have won in maximum 21 moves (41 ply), starting by replying 1...c5–c4, the Los Alamos chess equivalent of the Scandinavian Defense.

=== The third game ===
White: MANIAC I Black: Beginner
1.d3 b4 2.Nf3 d4 3.b3 e4 4.Ne1 a4 5.bxa4 Nxa4 6.Kd2 Nc3 7.Nxc3 bxc3+ 8.Kd1 f4 9.a3 Rb6 10.a4 Ra6 11.a5 Kd5 12.Qa3 Qb5 13.Qa2+ Ke5 14.Rb1 Rxa5 15.Rxb5 Rxa2 16.Rb1 Ra5 17.f3 Ra4 18.fxe4 c4 19.Nf3+ Kd6 20.e5+ Kd5 21.exf6=Q Nc5 22.Qxd4+ Kc6 23.Ne5# 1–0

	a	b	c	d	e	f
6	a6	b6	c6 black king	d6	e6	f6	6
5	a5	b5	c5 black knight	d5	e5 white knight	f5	5
4	a4 black rook	b4	c4 black pawn	d4 white queen	e4	f4 black pawn	4
3	a3	b3	c3 black pawn	d3 white pawn	e3	f3	3
2	a2	b2	c2 white pawn	d2	e2 white pawn	f2	2
1	a1	b1 white rook	c1	d1 white king	e1	f1 white rook	1
	a	b	c	d	e	f

Game III final position after 23.Ne5#
