= I'm Alive =

I'm Alive may refer to:

== Music ==
=== Albums ===
- I'm Alive (Jackson Browne album) or the title song (see below), 1993
- I'm Alive (Kelly Keagy album) or the title song, 2006
- I'm Alive (EP), by The Hollies, or the title song (see below), 1965

=== Songs ===
- "I'm Alive" (Celine Dion song), 2002
- "I'm Alive" (Electric Light Orchestra song), 1980
- "I'm Alive" (Elhaida Dani song), 2015
- "I'm Alive" (The Hollies song), 1965
- "I'm Alive" (Jackson Browne song), 1993
- "I'm Alive" (Seal song), 1995
- "I'm Alive" (Stretch & Vern song), 1996
- "I'm Alive" (Tommy James and the Shondells song), 1969
- "I'm Alive" (Willie Nelson song), 2008; covered by Kenny Chesney with Dave Matthews, 2009
- "I'm Alive", by 999 from 999, 1978
- "I'm Alive", by Anthrax from Worship Music, 2011
- "I'm Alive", by Audio Adrenaline from Lift, 2001
- "I'm Alive!", by Becca from Alive!!, 2008
- "I'm Alive", by Blind Guardian from Imaginations from the Other Side, 1995
- "I'm Alive", by Cirith Ungol from Frost and Fire, 1981
- "I'm Alive", by Disturbed from Ten Thousand Fists, 2005
- "I'm Alive", by Gotthard from Lipservice, 2005
- "I'm Alive", by Heather Nova from Siren, 1998
- "I'm Alive", by Helloween from Keeper of the Seven Keys: Part I, 1987
- "I'm Alive", by the Hives, 2019
- "I'm Alive", by Jeremy Camp from Speaking Louder Than Before, 2008
- "I'm Alive", by Kiss from Asylum, 1985
- "I'm Alive", by Neil Diamond from Heartlight, 1983
- "I'm Alive", by Story of the Year from The Constant, 2010
- "I'm Alive", by W.A.S.P. from Inside the Electric Circus, 1986
- "I'm Alive", by Yoko Ono from Between My Head and the Sky, 2009
- "I'm Alive", from the musical Next to Normal, 2008
- "I'm Alive (Life Sounds Like)", by Michael Franti, 2013
- "I'm Alive (That Was the Day My Dead Pet Returned to Save My Life)", by Alice Cooper from Zipper Catches Skin, 1982

== Other media ==
- I'm Alive (book), a 2012 memoir by Masoumeh Abad
- I'm Alive, a 1980 autobiography by Cecil Williams
- I'm Alive (TV series), a 2009–2011 American reality series

== See also ==
- I Am Alive (disambiguation)
