= Maniaci =

Maniaci is an Italian surname. Notable people with the surname include:

- Joe Maniaci (1914 – 1996), American football player and coach
- Michael Maniaci (born 1976), American opera singer
- Teodoro Maniaci, American cinematographer and documentary director

== See also ==
- Maniac (disambiguation)
- Maniace
