= Mary Tsingou =

American mathematician (1928–2026)

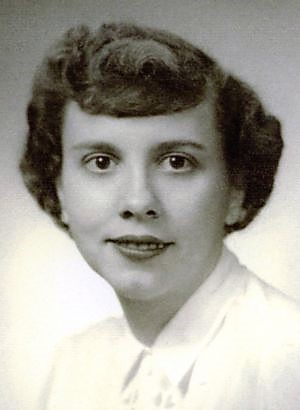
- Tsingou-Menzel in 1955
- Born: Mary Tsingou; October 14, 1928; Milwaukee, Wisconsin, U.S.
- Died: August 27, 2026 (aged 97); Los Alamos, New Mexico, U.S.
- Citizenship: United States
- Education: University of Wisconsin; University of Michigan
- Known for: Fermi–Pasta–Ulam–Tsingou problem
- Scientific career
- Fields: Physics; Scientific computing
- Workplaces: Los Alamos National Laboratory

Mary Tsingou-Menzel (October 14, 1928 – August 27, 2026) was an American physicist and mathematician of Greek-Bulgarian descent. She was one of the first programmers on the MANIAC computer at Los Alamos National Laboratory and is best known for programming the simulations for the celebrated computer experiment with Enrico Fermi, John Pasta, and Stanisław Ulam. This experiment became an inspiration for the fields of chaos theory and scientific computing, and was a turning point in soliton theory.

== Background ==
Mary Tsingou was born in Milwaukee, Wisconsin, on October 14, 1928, her Greek parents having moved to the United States from Bulgaria. In the aftermath of the Great Depression, the family left the U.S. to spend several years in Bulgaria. In 1940, they returned to the States, where Tsingou attended high school and college. She graduated with a bachelor's degree in mathematics and education in 1951 from the University of Wisconsin. She then studied at the University of Michigan, receiving a master's degree in mathematics in 1955. In 1958, she married Joseph Menzel. She had two daughters, Ann and Carol, who grew up to be medical doctors.

Tsingou died at her home in Los Alamos, New Mexico, on August 27, 2026, at the age of 97.

== Career ==
Tsingou joined the theoretical division of the Los Alamos National Laboratory, where she became one of the first programmers on the MANIAC. Besides working on weapons, the group also studied fundamental physics. Following Fermi's suggestion to analyze numerically the predictions of a statistical model of solids, Tsingou came up with an algorithm to simulate the relaxation of energy in a model crystal, which she implemented on the MANIAC. The analysis became known in the computational physics community as the Fermi–Pasta–Ulam problem (FPU). In 2008, Tsingou's contributions were recognized and the analysis was renamed as the Fermi–Pasta–Ulam–Tsingou problem (FPUT). The result was an important stepping stone for chaos theory.

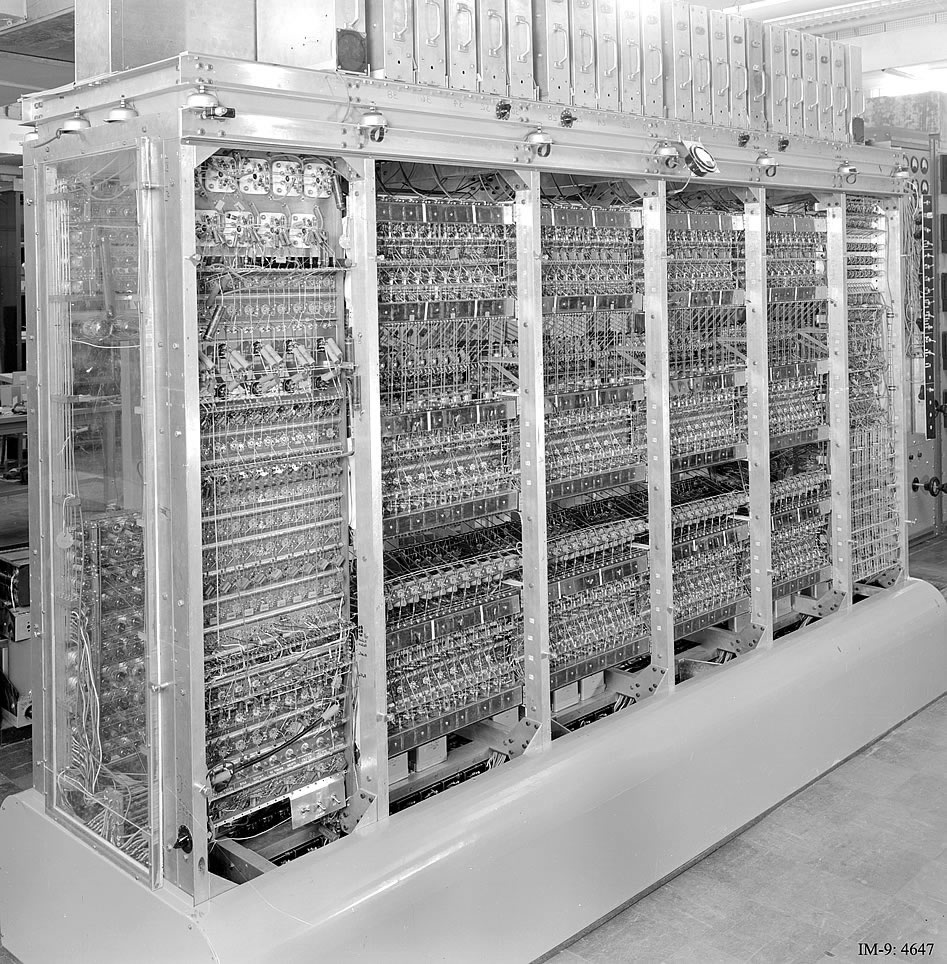
The MANIAC’s arithmetic unit nearing completion in 1952.

After Fermi's death, James L. Tuck and Tsingou-Menzel repeated the original FPUT results and provided strong indication that the nonlinear FPUT problem might be integrable.

Tsingou-Menzel continued her computational career at Los Alamos. She was an early expert on Fortran. In the 1980s, she worked on calculations for the "proton storage ring" in the Star Wars program (the Strategic Defense Initiative), which was one of President Ronald Reagan's projects. She retired in 1991.

== Recognition ==
The 1955 Los Alamos report named Fermi, Pasta, and Ulam as its authors, but separately stated that the work had been done by Fermi, Pasta, Ulam, and Tsingou; it also thanked Tsingou for coding the problems and running the computations on the MANIAC. Despite that explicit credit, the experiment was known for more than half a century as the Fermi–Pasta–Ulam (FPU) problem. It was not until 2008, when an article published in Physics Today by physicist Thierry Dauxois drew renewed attention to Tsingou's role and called for the problem to be renamed FPUT; the expanded name has since entered scientific usage. Subsequent publications referencing the FPUT problem reflect this change. In 2020, National Security Science magazine, published by Los Alamos National Laboratory, featured an article on Tsingou that included her commentary and historical reflections on the FPUT problem. The article was titled "We thank Miss Mary Tsingou" in reference to the acknowledgement that appeared on the title page of the original FPUT technical report from 1955.

== Publications ==
- J. L. Tuck; M. T. Menzel (December 1972). "The superperiod of the nonlinear weighted string (FPU) problem". Advances in Mathematics. 9 (3): 399–407. doi:10.1016/0001-8708(72)90024-2. OCLC 4922300485.
- Devaney, Joseph J.; Petschek, Albert G.; Tsingou Menzel, Mary (1958). On the Production of Heavy Uranium Isotopes in a Very High Density Fast Neutron Flux. Los Alamos Scientific Laboratory of the University of California. OCLC 696158179. OSTI 4291017.

== See also ==
- Kathleen Antonelli
- Jean Bartik
- Adele Goldstine
- Mary Ann Mansigh
- Marlyn Meltzer
- Betty Holberton
- Frances Spence
- Ruth Teitelbaum
