= Berni Alder =

American physicist (1925–2020)

Berni Julian Alder
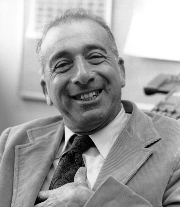
- Born: September 9, 1925; Duisburg, Prussia
- Died: September 7, 2020 (aged 94); El Cerrito, California, US
- Education: University of California, Berkeley; California Institute of Technology
- Known for: Molecular dynamics simulation
- Awards: Boltzmann Medal (2001); National Medal of Science (2009)
- Scientific career
- Fields: Statistical mechanics
- Workplaces: University of California, Berkeley; Lawrence Livermore Laboratory; University of California, Davis
- Thesis: The Radial Distribution Function and the Thermodynamic Properties of Monatomic Liquids (1952)
- Doctoral advisor: John Gamble Kirkwood

Berni Julian Alder (September 9, 1925 – September 7, 2020) was a German-born American physicist specialized in statistical mechanics, and a pioneer of computational modelling of matter.

== Biography ==
Alder was born in Duisburg, Prussia, in September 1925, to Jewish parents, a chemist and a homemaker. After the Nazis came to power, the family moved to Zurich, Switzerland. Fearing an invasion by Nazi Germany after the outbreak of World War II, the family applied for a visa to the United States, which was granted in 1941. They left by sealed train from neutral Switzerland to (formally neutral) Spain, then to Portugal, where they took a ship to the US. Following a stint in the US Navy after US entry into the war, he obtained a BSc in chemistry from the University of California, Berkeley and a master's degree in chemical engineering from the same institution in 1947. He went to the California Institute of Technology to study under John Gamble Kirkwood for his PhD in 1948 and worked for the investigation of phase transitions in hard-sphere gas with Stan Frankel, where he got the idea to use the Monte Carlo method.

After he finished at Caltech in 1952, Alder went to Berkeley and worked part-time at Berkeley to teach chemistry and part-time as a consultant under the suggestion of Edward Teller in the nuclear weapons program for the Lawrence Livermore National Laboratory to help with the equations of state. In collaboration with Thomas Everett Wainwright, and Mary Ann Mansigh, he developed techniques for molecular dynamics simulation in the mid-1950s, including the liquid-solid phase transition for hard sphere and the velocity autocorrelations function decay in liquids.

Alder, along with Teller, was one of the founders of the Department of Applied Science in 1963. He was a professor of applied science at the University of California, Davis, and later professor emeritus.

Alder died on September 7, 2020, of heart failure.

== Honors ==
In 2001, he was awarded the Boltzmann Medal for inventing technique of molecular dynamics simulation. Alder was elected a Fellow of the American Academy of Arts and Sciences in 2008. In 2009, he was awarded the National Medal of Science. Alder was a Guggenheim Fellow. He was the editor of the book series Methods in Computational Physics and the founder of the magazine Computing.
