= Maniacal (disambiguation) =

Maniacal refers to mania, an abnormally elevated emotional state.

Maniacal may also refer to:

- Maniacal (film), a 2003 horror film
- Maniacal (album) by Sworn Enemy
- "Maniacal", a song from the Front Line Assembly, album Civilization

== See also ==
- Mania (disambiguation)
- Maniac (disambiguation)
