= Leave Your Mark =

Studio album by Stars in Stereo
- Released: June 7, 2014
- Genre: Alternative metal
- Length: 34:58
- Label: Hundred Handed Inc.
- Producer: Hundred Handed Inc.

Stars in Stereo chronology
| Stars in Stereo (2013) | Leave Your Mark (2014) |

Singles from Stars in Stereo
- 1. "Leave Your Mark" Released: 2014; 2. "Fair-Weather Friend" Released: 2014

Leave Your Mark is the second and final studio album by the alternative rock band Stars in Stereo, released on June 7, 2014. It had Ryan "Frogs" McCormack on bass guitar instead of Justin Siegel, who left in 2013 to pursue other interests. The album contained 11 new songs self-produced by the band's own indie record label, Hundred Handed Inc. and included the singles "Leave Your Mark" and "Fair-Weather Friend". The album received mixed but generally positive reviews and even had some minor rock music Billboard success, proving to be marginally more successful than their previous album.

== Background ==
Leave Your Mark was recorded during the first quarter of 2014 and officially released on June 7 the same year, but live video recordings of individual songs were released every day leading up to the official release through a "Virtual Tour" project created by the band. Starting on June 10, the band released a live video recording of a different song every day on a different website. Each video contained a hidden tarot card somewhere that linked fans to a winners' page upon clicking. The first ten fans to click the tarot card and follow the link received their choice of prize offered by the band, such as band T-shirts, logo necklaces or the album as a CD or a vinyl. Leave Your Mark, like the band's previous album, contained music best described as alternative rock with pop music influences, but was definitely more hard rock driven and energetic than Stars in Stereo's previous offering.

An official music video for the single "Leave Your Mark", showing the lead vocalist, Becca, in a tight leather outfit in a BDSM environment lyrically and visually discussing erotic freedom, was released and considered to be "Not safe for work" (NSFW) by many fans and reviewers. Jordan McGraw said, "We wanted to make a video for ‘Leave Your Mark’ that was a 100% true to the concept of the song. It isn't explicit for the sake of being dirty – it’s honest. It stays with the idea that you shouldn't be ashamed of who you are and what makes you feel sexy. The fact that even the censored version is too much for people to support shows exactly why people feel the need to hide their quirks and fetishes. We say f**k it as long as you're not hurting anyone who doesn't want to be hurt. Get off how you want to get off."

== Track listing ==
| No. | Title | Writer(s) | Length |
|---|---|---|---|
| 1. | "Not a Shot" | Hollcraft, McGraw | 3:19 |
| 2. | "Echo" | Hollcraft, McGraw | 3:20 |
| 3. | "Leave Your Mark" | Hollcraft, McGraw | 3:12 |
| 4. | "Fair-Weather Friend" | Hollcraft, McGraw | 2:54 |
| 5. | "Firestarter" | Hollcraft, McGraw | 2:48 |
| 6. | "I Can't" | Hollcraft, McGraw | 3:02 |
| 7. | "Bed of Thornes" | Hollcraft, McGraw | 2:46 |
| 8. | "Vacancy" | Hollcraft, McGraw | 2:42 |
| 9. | "Wasted (Until I'm Gone)" | Hollcraft, McGraw | 3:08 |
| 10. | "Turn Me" | Hollcraft, McGraw | 3:40 |
| 11. | "Fall Forward" | Hollcraft, McGraw | 4:01 |
| Total length: | | | 34:58 |

== Band members ==
- Bec Hollcraft - lead vocals, rhythm guitar
- Jordan McGraw - lead guitar, acoustic guitar, piano
- Ryan McCormack - bass guitar
- Drew Langan - drums, percussion
