= MANIAC III =

Computer built in 1961 for the University of Chicago

The MANIAC III (Mathematical Analyzer Numerical Integrator and Automatic Computer Model III) is a second-generation electronic computer (i.e., using solid-state electronics rather than vacuum tubes), that was built in 1961 for use at the Institute for Computer Research at the University of Chicago.

It was designed by Nicholas Metropolis and constructed by the staff of the Institute for Computer Research. Its design was changed to eliminate vacuum tubes, thus it occupied a very small part of a very large and powerfully air-conditioned room. It used 20,000 diodes, 12,000 transistors, and had 16K 48-bit words of magnetic-core memory. Its floating-point multiplication time was 71 microseconds, and division time was 81 microseconds.

The MANIAC III's most novel feature was unnormalized significance arithmetic floating point. This allowed users to determine the change in precision of results due to the nature of the computation.

It weighed about 600 pounds (270 kg).

== See also ==
- MANIAC I
- MANIAC II
