= Becca (musician) =

American singer-songwriter

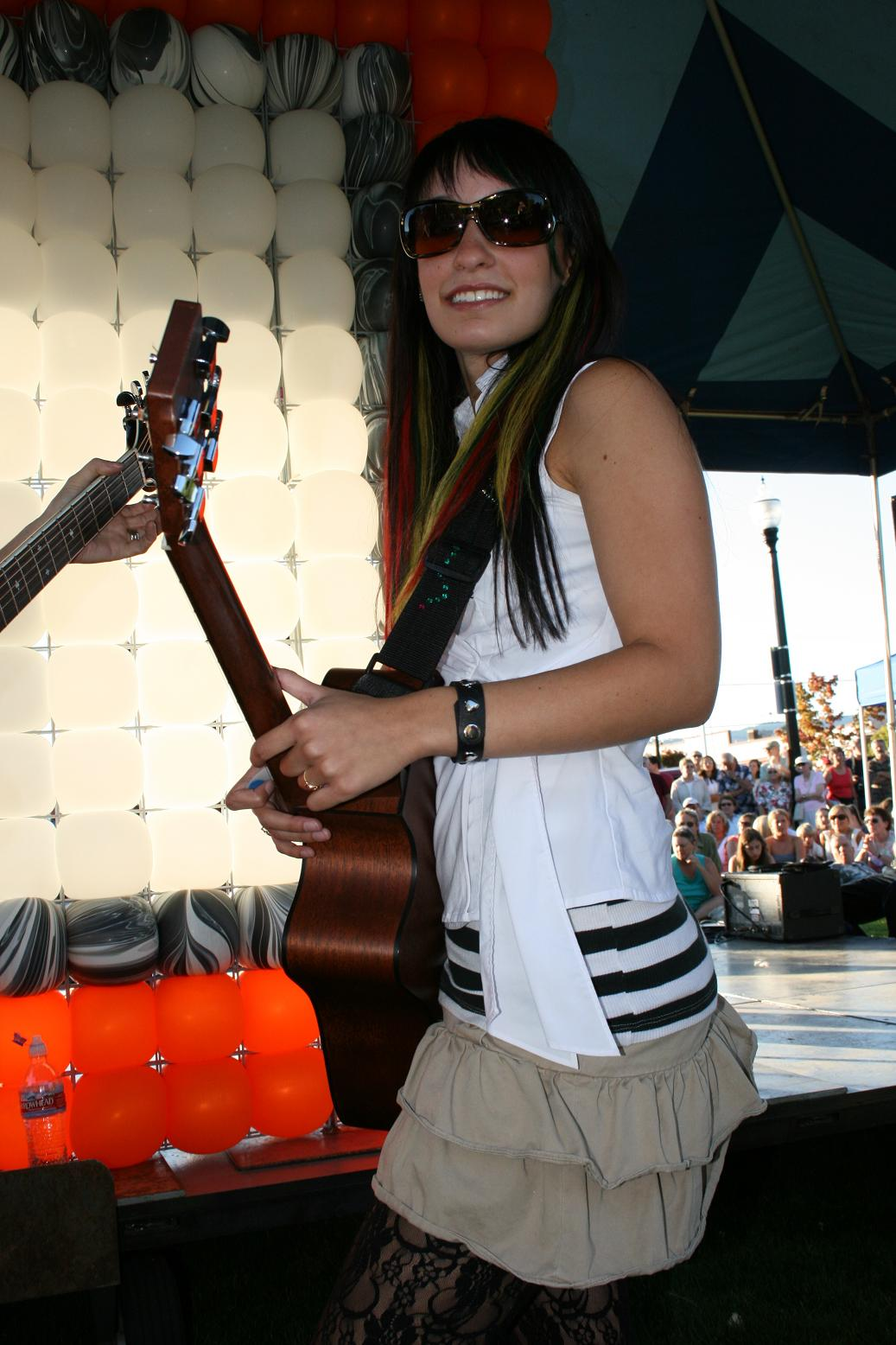
- Becca in 2007

Background information
- Born: Rebecca Emily Hollcraft; May 9, 1989 (age 37)
- Origin: Portland, Oregon, U.S.
- Genres: Pop, rock
- Occupations: Singer, songwriter
- Instruments: Vocals, guitar
- Years active: 2000–present
- Labels: Sony Music Entertainment, Kissing Booth

Rebecca Emily Hollcraft (born May 9, 1989) is an American singer-songwriter and guitarist, known professionally as Becca, Becca-chan, and Bec Hollcraft. From 2012 to 2015, she was the lead singer in the rock band Stars in Stereo.

== Early life ==
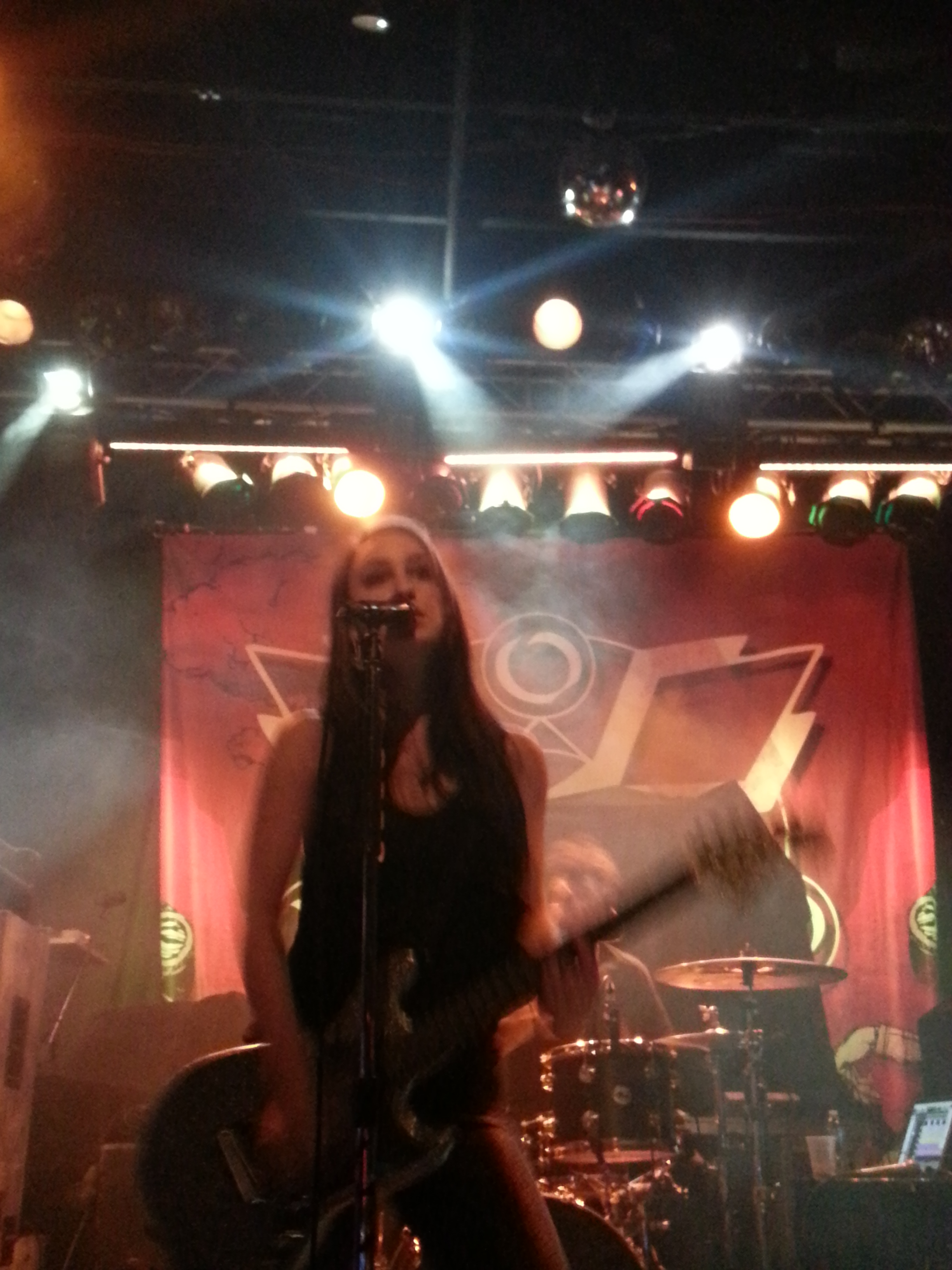
Becca Hollcraft performing with Stars in Stereo

Hollcraft was born in Portland, Oregon. She began singing and writing songs at a young age and started playing guitar when she was 10 years old. When she was 13, a family friend recorded her at a choir event in school. The tape found its way to Meredith Brooks, who had been looking for a new artist to develop. "Bec has a powerhouse voice, and when I realized she could write songs, too… I was sold," said Meredith.

== Career ==
=== 2008–2011: Solo career ===
With the support of her parents, Hollcraft spent her summer vacation that year in Los Angeles with Meredith working on demos. In early 2008, Hollcraft signed a deal with Sony Music Entertainment Japan and released her first single "Perfect Me" on April 9, 2008, in Japan. The song was a featured theme song for the TV show, Damages, in its Japanese release (from April 2, 2008, to June 1, 2008). BECCA's debut five-song EP, Perfect Me, was released in Japan on June 4, 2008, with a second five-song EP, "Turn to Stone", released August 6, 2008. BECCA also contributed a cover of "I Drove All Night" to a Cyndi Lauper tribute-album that was released July 23, 2008.

Hollcraft's debut full-length album, Alive!!, was released on November 5, 2008. "I'm Alive" was the first single released (on September 23, 2008), along with a video. The album features the Roy Orbison cover song, "I Drove All Night", which she contributed to the We Love Cyndi Lauper tribute album in July 2008. On October 22 the single from the album—"I'm Alive!"—was released with a bonus B-side track cover of "Alone" by Heart. She performed in Baltimore at Otakon that year. The song was also used as the first ending theme of the anime Black Butler.

On September 29, 2009, Hollcraft released her U.S. debut EP, Kickin' & Screamin', on March 2, 2010.

=== 2011–2015: Stars in Stereo ===
Stars in Stereo was formed in 2011. It consists of vocalist Hollcraft, guitarist Jordan McGraw, bassist Ryan "Frogs" McCormack, and drummer Drew Langan. The band came together after McGraw, McCormack, Langan, and Justin Siegel's band, City (Comma) State, broke up. The band spent most of 2012 on the road, touring in support of bands such as The Used, Foxy Shazam, Hoobastank, and Blue October. The band released the single and music video for "The Broken", in August 2012.

Later that year, they began recording their first full-length album. To hold fans over until the release, the band recorded two reinterpreted cover songs available as free downloads: Nine Inch Nails', "Closer" and Aerosmith's "Dream On". Their self-titled debut, Stars in Stereo, was released on April 9, 2013, through their own indie label.

In 2013, Stars in Stereo co-headlined on tour with Flyleaf and Drowning Pool, and toured with Bullet for My Valentine and Halestorm on the Hard Drive Live 5 tour.

In June 2013, Siegel left the group to pursue other interests. Frogs switched to bass, and the band continued as a quartet, releasing their second album Leave Your Mark in June 2014. The group disbanded in June 2015.

=== 2015–present: Collaborations ===
Hollcraft's current musical endeavors include fantasy folk/rock band Blackhaven, techno project Wholecraft, and industrial metal band Contracult Collective.

== Discography ==
=== Solo studio albums ===
- Alive!! (2008)
- Alive!!+5 (2009)
- Tokyo-o-ing (2009)
- Best (2011)

=== Extended plays ===
- Perfect Me ～完璧な私～ (Kanpeki na Watashi) (2008)
- Turn to Stone (2008)
- Kickin' & Screamin' (2010)

=== With Stars in Stereo ===
- Stars in Stereo (2013)
- Leave Your Mark (2014)

=== As Wholecraft ===
- Last Survivor (2016)
- Vanishing (2018)
- Dig Deep (2019)
- Ouroboros (2020)
