= Stars in Stereo (album) =

Studio album by Stars in Stereo
- Released: April 9, 2013
- Genre: Alternative rock
- Length: 38:50
- Label: Hundred Handed Inc.
- Producer: Mike Green; Howard Benson

Stars in Stereo chronology
Stars in Stereo EP (2012)	Stars in Stereo (2013)	Leave Your Mark (2014)

Singles from Stars in Stereo
- 1. "Every Last Thing" Released: 2012; 2. "The Broken" Released: 2012

Stars in Stereo is the debut studio album by alternative rock band Stars in Stereo, released on April 9, 2013. It contained 10 tracks including all four tracks from the 2012 EP, a bonus track, and an online link to a second bonus track. It was self-produced through the band's own indie record label, Hundred Handed Inc. and featured the singles "Every Last Thing" and "The Broken", which were both featured in music videos. The album received mostly positive reviews but was largely commercially unsuccessful.

== Background ==
The song "Every Last Thing" was the first song and single written by the group, which was later featured in a music video. The band said that they wished to express suspense and drama through the video reminiscent of 30 Seconds to Mars' video for "The Kill" in an interview with Music Junkie Press. The songs "The Broken" and "Violence" plus "Red Eyed Romance" had already been written and recorded for the 2012 Stars in Stereo EP. The six new songs were written while on tour in late 2012 and recorded soon after in 2013 in time for the album release. The sound of the album was mostly of alternative rock with hints of pop music with electronic influences. The band expressed that they wanted "The Broken" to be their main single because the lyrics contained the main mission statement of the album and the band. The album contained an alternate version of the single "Every Last Thing" and an online link to a second bonus song, "Night by Night", located just below the disc inside the CD case. The song "Half Life" was written and recorded for the album but was excluded from the final copy and released separately.

== Track listing ==
No.	Title	Writer(s)	Length
1.	"The Broken"	McGraw, Siegel, Green	3:39
2.	"Violence"	McGraw, Varon, Langan, Siegel	2:57
3.	"All Together"	Hollcraft, McGraw, Green, Siegel, Langan	3:22
4.	"Dealing Secrets"	Hollcraft, McGraw, Green, Siegel, Langan	3:21
5.	"Lie Down"	Hollcraft, McGraw, Siegel, Green, Langan	4:08
6.	"Red Eyed Romance"	Hollcraft, McGraw, Green, Siegel, Langan	3:03
7.	"Open Your Eyes"	Hollcraft, McGraw, Siegel	3:19
8.	"At the Stroke of Midnight,"	Hollcraft, McGraw, Green, Siegel, Langan	3:28
9.	"Every Last Thing"	McGraw, Siegel, Langan, Varon	3:50
10.	"Queen of Catastrophe"	Hollcraft, McGraw, Langan, Siegel, Varon	3:38
Total length:			38:50

=== Bonus tracks ===
No.	Title	Writer(s)	Length
11.	"Every Last Thing (Alternate Version)"	Hollcraft, McGraw, Langan, Siegel, Varon	3:59
12.	"Night by Night"	McGraw, Langan, Siegel, Varon	3:49
Total length:			46:38

=== Tracks recorded but released separately ===
No.	Title	Writer(s)	Length
13.	"Half Life"	McGraw, Varon, Langan, Siegel	4:13

== Band members ==
- Bec Hollcraft - lead vocals, rhythm guitar
- Jordan McGraw - lead guitar, acoustic guitar, piano
- Ryan McCormack - rhythm guitar
- Drew Langan - drums, percussion
- Justin Siegel - bass guitar
