= I Am Alive (disambiguation) =

I Am Alive is a 2012 video game.

I Am Alive may also refer to:

- I Am Alive: Surviving the Andes Plane Crash, a 2010 television documentary
- "I Am Alive", a song by Little Man Tate, 2009
- "I Am Alive", a song by Paul van Dyk from From Then On, 2017
- "I Am Alive", a song by Ultravox from Revelation, 1993

== See also ==
- I'm Alive (disambiguation)
