= Mary Ann Mansigh =

American computer programmer (1932–2024)

- Born: September 12, 1932
- Died: August 24, 2024 (aged 91–92)
- Known for: Computer programmer

Mary Ann Ruth Mansigh Karlsen (September 12, 1932 – August 24, 2024) was an American computer programmer who was active in the 1950s in the use of scientific computers.

== Biography ==
Mansigh was born on September 12, 1932 in Otter Tail County, Minnesota. She attended the University of Minnesota Duluth on a scholarship from 1950 to 1954, where she studied physics, chemistry and mathematics. In 1955, she took a position at the Lawrence Livermore National Laboratory as a software engineer, where she would remain until she retired in 1994, working on over 13 generations of supercomputers from the UNIVAC (1955) to the Cray I (1994).

At the Lawrence Livermore National Laboratory, she worked with Berni Alder and Tom Wainwright in the implementation of molecular dynamics in the mid twentieth century, ultimately working exclusively with Alder for over twenty-five years. She is regarded as a pioneer in programming and computing, particularly molecular dynamics computing, whom Dutch computational physicist Daan Frenkel noted as being one of the very few notable female computer programmers, with Arianna W. Rosenbluth, that were active in the 1950s and 1960s.

Initially forgotten, except in annotations and oral transcripts, she has received increased attention in recent times, with events and talks on her legacy. In 2019, she had a lecture series at the Centre Européen de Calcul Atomique et Moléculaire (CECAM) named in her honour. Modern academics have noted her unfair absence as an author in published academic papers describing the results of computer programmes designed with her pioneering molecular dynamics computing code.

Mansigh died on August 24, 2024 at the age of 91.

== See also ==
- Mary Tsingou
