= Austin Meade =

American musician

- Born: c. 1994; New Braunfels, Texas, US
- Genres: Hard rock, country rock, Southern rock
- Instruments: Vocals, guitar, drums
- Years active: 2016–present
- Labels: Spinefarm, 7013

Austin Meade (born c. 1994) is an American musician, singer, and songwriter.

== Biography ==
Meade, the son of a Baptist preacher, recalled his earliest musical experiences being his father taking him to see noted classic rock acts like AC/DC and Journey. His first experience playing guitar was in the church, when his father handed him an acoustic guitar and had him learn songs for the church band which at the time lacked a guitarist. Before beginning his music career, Meade worked as a drum teacher at a School of Rock franchise owned by country singer Cody Canada.

== Personal life ==
Meade is an alumnus of Texas A&M University. He also has a wife and two children.

== Discography ==
=== Studio albums ===
- Chief of the Sinners (2014)
- Waves (2019)
- Black Sheep (2021)
- Abstract Art of an Unstable Mind (2022)
- Almost Famous (2025)

=== EPs ===
- Heartbreak Coming (2016)
- Rosé Romance (2022)
- Pretty Little Waist (2024)

=== Singles ===
Title	Year	Peak chart positions		Album
Title	Year	US Main.	US Hot Hard Rock	Album
"Satan & St. Paul"	2018	—	—	Non-album single
"Happier Alone" (solo or feat. Koe Wetzel)	2020	—	16	Black Sheep
"Dopamine Drop"	2020	—	—	Black Sheep
"Cave In"	2020	—	—	Black Sheep
"Deja Vu"	2020	—	—	Black Sheep
"Loser Mentality"	2021	—	—	Abstract Art of an Unstable Mind
"Varsity Type"	2022	—	—	Abstract Art of an Unstable Mind
"Blackout" (solo or featuring Danny Worsnop)	2023	20	—	Pretty Little Waist
"Stoner Fantasy"	2024	—	—	Pretty Little Waist
"Rio Grande" (featuring Treaty Oak Revival)	2026	—	—	Non-album single

=== Music videos ===
List of music videos, showing year released and directors
Title	Year	Director(s)
"Meant for More"	2017	Jimmy James Heritage
"Waves"	2019	Unknown
"Happier Alone"	2020	Justin George
"Deja Vu"	2021	Unknown
"Happier Alone" (feat. Koe Wetzel)	2021	Justin George
"Lying to Myself"	2021	Andrew Gonzales
"Dopamine Drop"	2021	Unknown
"Varsity Type"	2022	Unknown
"Red Roof Estate"	2022	Andrew Gonzales
"Rosé Romance"	2022	Andrew Gonzales
"Blackout"	2023	Jon Vulpine
"Stoner Fantasy"	2024	Tanner Yeager
