= Nicholas Metropolis =

Greek-American physicist and mathematician (1915–1999)

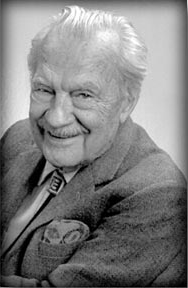
- Born: Nicholas Constantine Metropolis; June 11, 1915; Chicago, Illinois, United States
- Died: October 17, 1999 (aged 84); Los Alamos, New Mexico, United States
- Education: University of Chicago
- Known for: Monte Carlo method; Simulated annealing; Metropolis–Hastings algorithm
- Awards: Computer Pioneer Award (1984)
- Scientific career
- Fields: Physicist, Mathematician
- Workplaces: Los Alamos National Laboratory

Nicholas Constantine Metropolis (Greek: Νικόλαος Μητρόπουλος; June 11, 1915 – October 17, 1999) was a Greek-American physicist.

Metropolis received his BSc (1937) and PhD in physics (1941, with Robert Mulliken) at the University of Chicago. Shortly afterwards, Robert Oppenheimer recruited him from Chicago, where he was collaborating with Enrico Fermi and Edward Teller on the first nuclear reactors, to the Los Alamos National Laboratory.

He arrived in Los Alamos in April 1943, as a member of the original staff of fifty scientists. He came back to Los Alamos in 1948 to lead the group in the Theoretical Division that designed and built the MANIAC I computer in 1952 that was modeled on the IAS machine, and the MANIAC II in 1957.

== Early life and education ==
Nicolas Metropolis was born on June 11, 1915, in Chicago, US. Metropolis received his BSc (1936) and PhD in chemical physics (1941) at the University of Chicago. During his PhD he worked with Robert Mulliken. After graduation, he worked as an instructor at the University of Chicago with James Franck. Shortly afterwards, in 1943, Robert Oppenheimer recruited him from Chicago for the Manhattan Project, where he worked in Harold C. Urey's group. Later he joined University of Chicago Metallurgical Laboratory and worked under Edward Teller's supervision, who encouraged him to move into theoretical physics. At Los Alamos Metropolis worked together with Richard Feynman on "electromechanical devices used for hand computations".

== After World War II ==
After World War II, he returned to the faculty of the University of Chicago as an assistant professor. He came back to Los Alamos in 1948 to lead the group in the theoretical division that designed and built the MANIAC I computer in 1952 that was modeled on the IAS machine, and the MANIAC II in 1957. (John von Neumann thought this acronym too frivolous; Metropolis claims to have chosen the name "MANIAC" in the hope of stopping the rash of such acronyms for machine names, but may have instead further stimulated such use.) From 1957 to 1965 he was a full professor of physics at the University of Chicago and was the founding director of its Institute for Computer Research. In 1965 he returned to Los Alamos, where he was made a laboratory senior fellow in 1980.

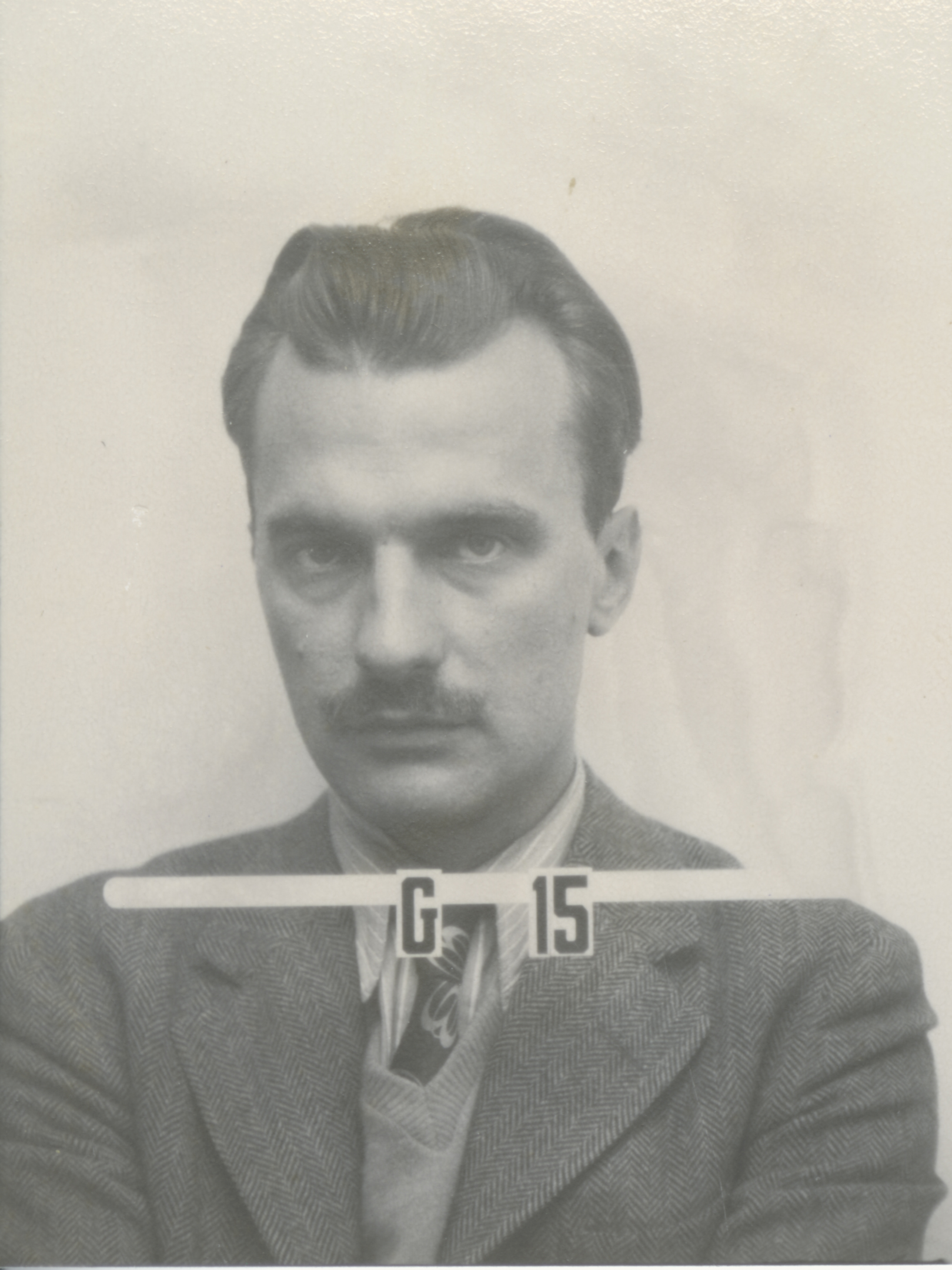
Metropolis's wartime Los Alamos National Laboratory badge photo.

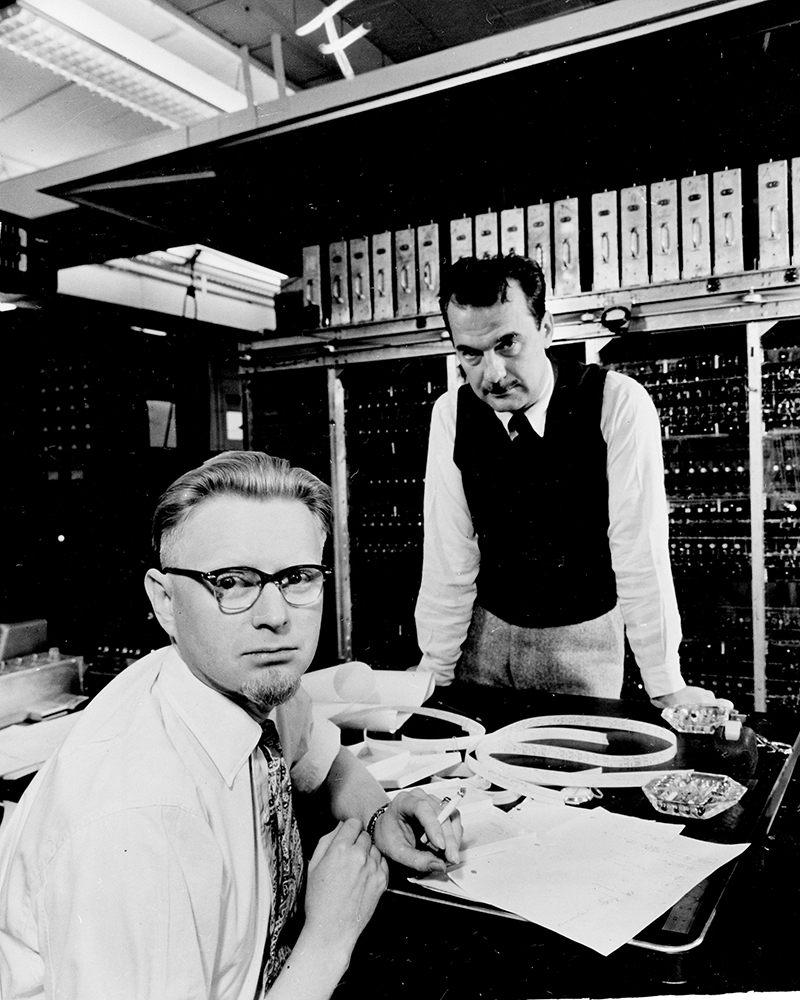
MANIAC project leader Nicholas Metropolis (standing) and the MANIAC’s chief engineer Jim Richardson in 1953.

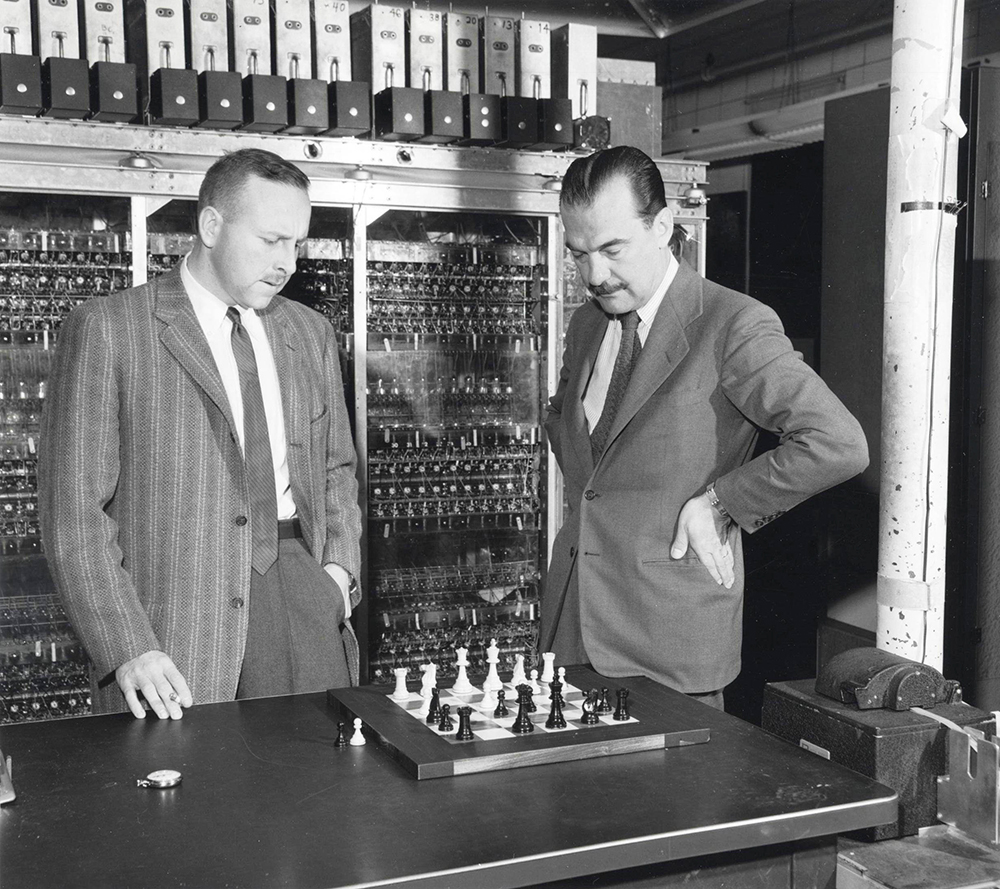
Paul Stein and Nicholas Metropolis play Los Alamos chess against the MANIAC, a simplified version of the game without bishops. The computer still needed about 20 minutes between moves.

== Monte Carlo method ==
At Los Alamos in the late 1940s and early 1950s a group of researchers led by Metropolis, including John von Neumann and Stanislaw Ulam, developed the Monte Carlo method. This is a class of computational approaches that rely on repeated random sampling to compute their results, named in reference to Ulam's relatives' love for the casinos of Monte Carlo. Metropolis was deeply involved in the very first use of the Monte Carlo method, rewiring the ENIAC computer to perform simulations of a nuclear core in 1948. In 1953 Metropolis was credited as a co-author of a paper entitled Equation of State Calculations by Fast Computing Machines. This landmark paper showed the first numerical simulations of a liquid and introduced a new Monte Carlo computational method for doing so.

In applications of the Monte Carlo method to problems in statistical mechanics prior to the introduction of the Metropolis algorithm, a large number of random configurations of the system would be generated, the properties of interest (such as energy or density) would be computed for each configuration, and then a weighted average computed where the weight of each configuration was its Boltzmann factor, $e^{-E/kT}$, where $E$ is the energy, $T$ is the temperature, and $k$ is the Boltzmann constant. The key contribution of the paper was the idea that

Instead of choosing configurations randomly, then weighting them with exp(−E/kT), we choose configurations with a probability exp(−E/kT) and weight them evenly.

— Metropolis et al.,

The algorithm for generating samples from the Boltzmann distribution was later generalized by W.K. Hastings and has become widely known as the Metropolis–Hastings algorithm.

In recent years a controversy has arisen as to whether Metropolis actually made significant contributions to the Equation of State Calculations paper.

== Associations and honors ==
Metropolis was a member of the American Academy of Arts and Sciences, the Society for Industrial and Applied Mathematics and the American Mathematical Society. In 1987 he became the first Los Alamos employee honored with the title "emeritus" by the University of California. Metropolis was also awarded the Pioneer Medal by the Institute of Electrical and Electronics Engineers, and was a fellow of the American Physical Society.

The Nicholas Metropolis Award for Outstanding Doctoral Thesis Work in Computational Physics is awarded annually by the American Physical Society.

== Acting career ==
Metropolis played the part of a scientist in the Woody Allen film Husbands and Wives (1992).

== Personal life ==
Metropolis had a son, Christopher, and two daughters, Penelope and Katharine. He was an avid skier and tennis player until his mid-seventies. He died at a nursing home in Los Alamos, New Mexico.

== Anecdotes ==
In his memoirs, Stanislaw Ulam remembers that a small group, including himself, Metropolis, Calkin, Konopinski, Kistiakowsky, Teller and von Neumann, spent several evenings at Los Alamos playing poker. They played for very small sums, but: "Metropolis once described what a triumph it was to win ten dollars from John von Neumann, author of a famous treatise on game theory. He then bought his book for five dollars and pasted the other five inside the cover as a symbol of his victory." In another passage of his book, Ulam describes Metropolis as "a Greek-American with a wonderful personality."

== Erdős number ==
Metropolis has an Erdős number of 2 and he enabled Richard Feynman to have an Erdős number of 3.

== See also ==
- Stochastics
- ENIAC
- Colossus computer
- Von Neumann paradox
