= Maniac (band) =

American band

- Origin: Los Angeles, California, United States
- Genres: Power pop, punk rock, new wave, garage rock
- Years active: 2013–present
- Labels: La Ti Da, No Front Teeth Records
- Members: Zache Davis; Andrew Zappin; Justin Maurer; James Carman

Maniac is a power pop, punk rock band from Los Angeles, CA. that was started by Andrew Zappin, Zache Davis of The Cute Lepers and The Girls, Ardavon Fatehi and Richie Cardenas of Clorox Girls and Neighborhood Brats in 2012. Shortly after Maniac's formation, Justin Maurer of La Drugz and Clorox Girls replaced Ardavon on guitar. The following year, Richie left and was replaced by James Carman of Images and LA Drugz on the drums. Maniac have been described as "a perfect combination of everything that's cool about melodic punk and power pop" and their first record Demimonde "offers the kind of melodic buzzsaw that’s just as likely to appeal to every fortysomething at the last Buzzcocks show as it will to every twentysomething at the last Ty Segall show."

The band released a single in 2013 and a full-length LP in 2014, both on La Ti Da records. The band premiered a video for "Party City" which was the first single off their LP "Demimonde" in 2015.

== Band members ==
- Andrew Zappin — Guitar
- James Carman — Drums
- Justin Maurer — Guitar and vocals
- Zache Davis — Bass and lead vocals
- Richie Cardenas — Drums (2012-2013)
- Ardavon Fatehi — Guitar (2012)

== Discography ==
- "Dim Sum / Pepe" — 7" single (La Ti Da Records)
- "Demimonde" — full length vinyl LP (La Ti Da Records on vinyl in N. America) and (Taken by Surprise on Vinyl in Europe)
- "Chola Queen/ Calamine" 7" single (No Front Teeth Records)
- "Midnight Kino / Precision Accuracy 7" single (Modern Action Records)
