= MANIAC I =

Computer built in 1952 for Los Alamos Scientific Lab

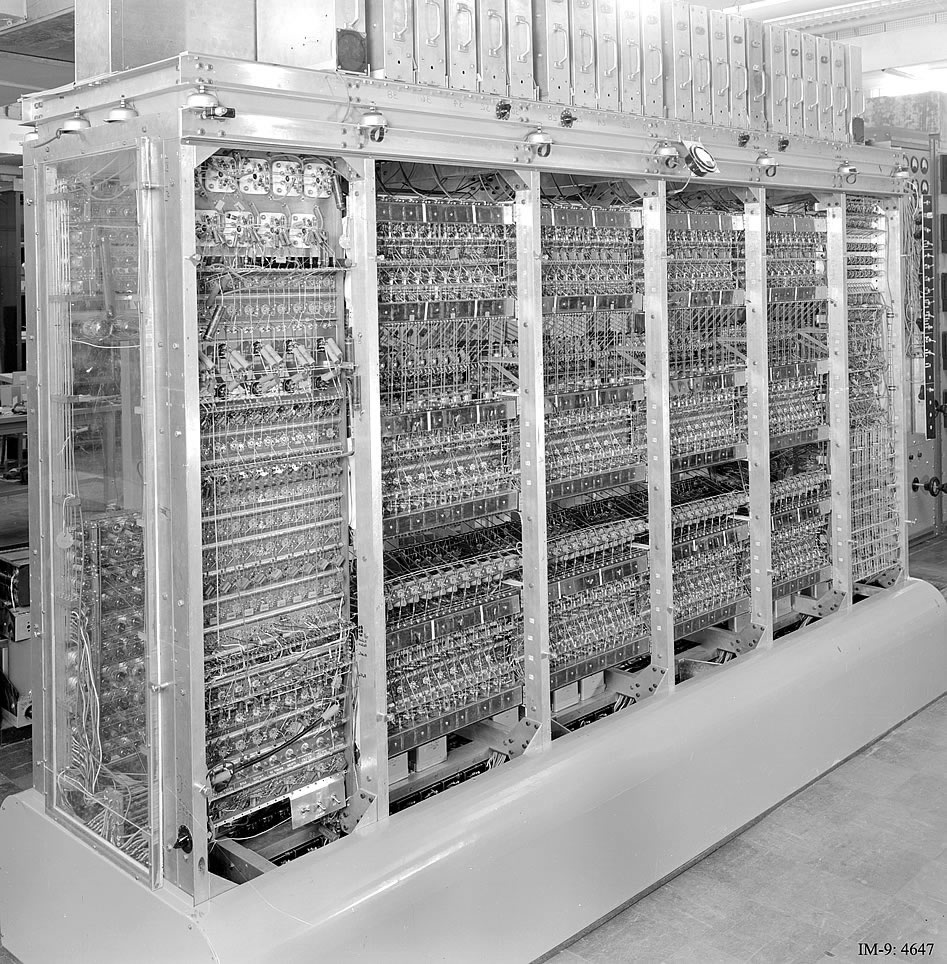
The MANIAC's arithmetic unit nearing completion in 1952.

The MANIAC I (Mathematical Analyzer Numerical Integrator and Automatic Computer Model I) is an early computer that was built under the direction of Nicholas Metropolis at the Los Alamos Scientific Laboratory and was completed in 1952. It was based on the von Neumann architecture of the IAS, developed by John von Neumann. As with almost all computers of its era, it was a one-of-a-kind machine that could not exchange programs with other computers (even the several other machines based on the IAS). Metropolis chose the name MANIAC in the hope of stopping the rash of silly acronyms for machine names, although von Neumann may have suggested the name to him.

The MANIAC weighed about 1,000 pounds (0.50 short tons; 0.45 t).

The first task assigned to the Los Alamos MANIAC was to perform more precise and extensive calculations of the thermonuclear process. In 1953, the MANIAC obtained the first equation of state calculated by modified Monte Carlo integration over configuration space.

In 1956, MANIAC I became the first computer to defeat a human being in a chess-like game. The chess variant, called Los Alamos chess, was developed for a 6×6 chessboard (no bishops) due to the limited amount of memory and computing power of the machine.

The MANIAC ran successfully in March 1952 and was shut down on July 15, 1958. It was succeeded by MANIAC II in 1957. MANIAC I was transferred to the University of New Mexico in bad condition, and was restored to full operation by Dale Sparks, PhD. It was featured in at least two UNM Maniac programming dissertations from 1963. It remained in operation until it was retired in 1965.

A third version, MANIAC III, was built at the Institute for Computer Research at the University of Chicago in 1964.

== Notable MANIAC programmers ==
- Mary Tsingou – developed algorithm used in the Fermi–Pasta–Ulam–Tsingou problem
- Klára Dán von Neumann – wrote the first programs for MANIAC I
- Dana Scott – programmed the MANIAC to enumerate all solutions to a pentomino puzzle by backtracking in 1958.
- Marjorie Devaney – one of the first MANIAC I programmers.
- Arianna W. Rosenbluth – wrote the first full implementation of the widely used Markov chain Monte Carlo algorithm.
- Paul Stein and Mark Wells – implemented Los Alamos chess.
- Nils Aall Barricelli – implemented artificial life.

== Gallery ==
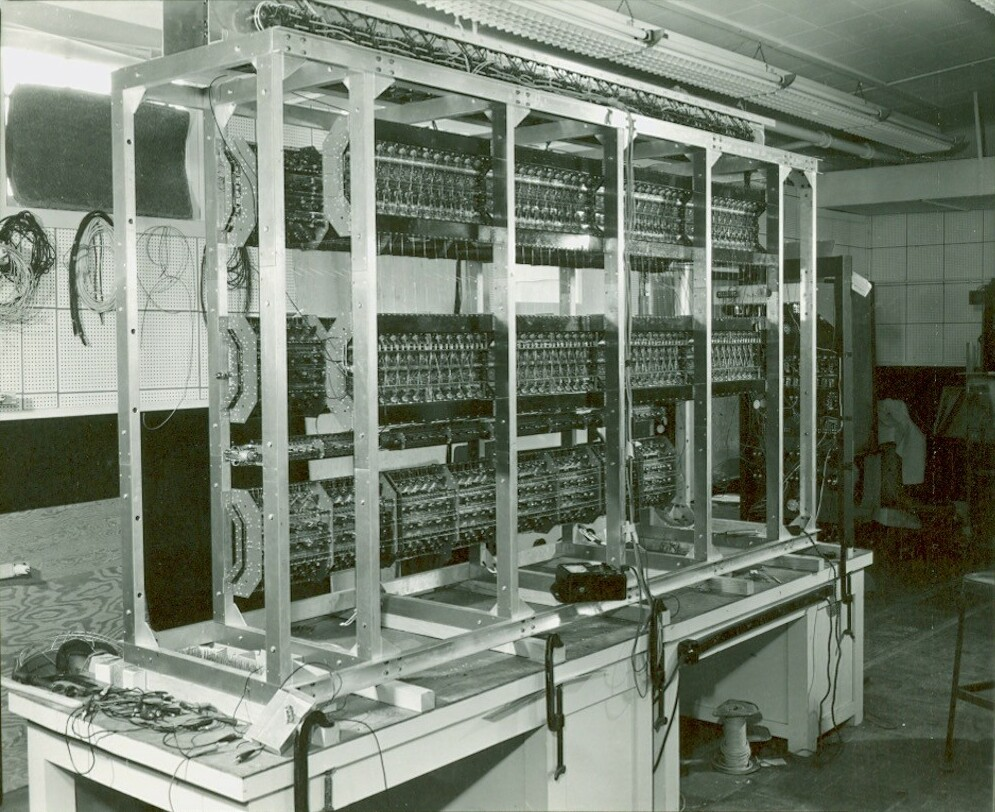
The MANIAC's chassis under construction in 1950.

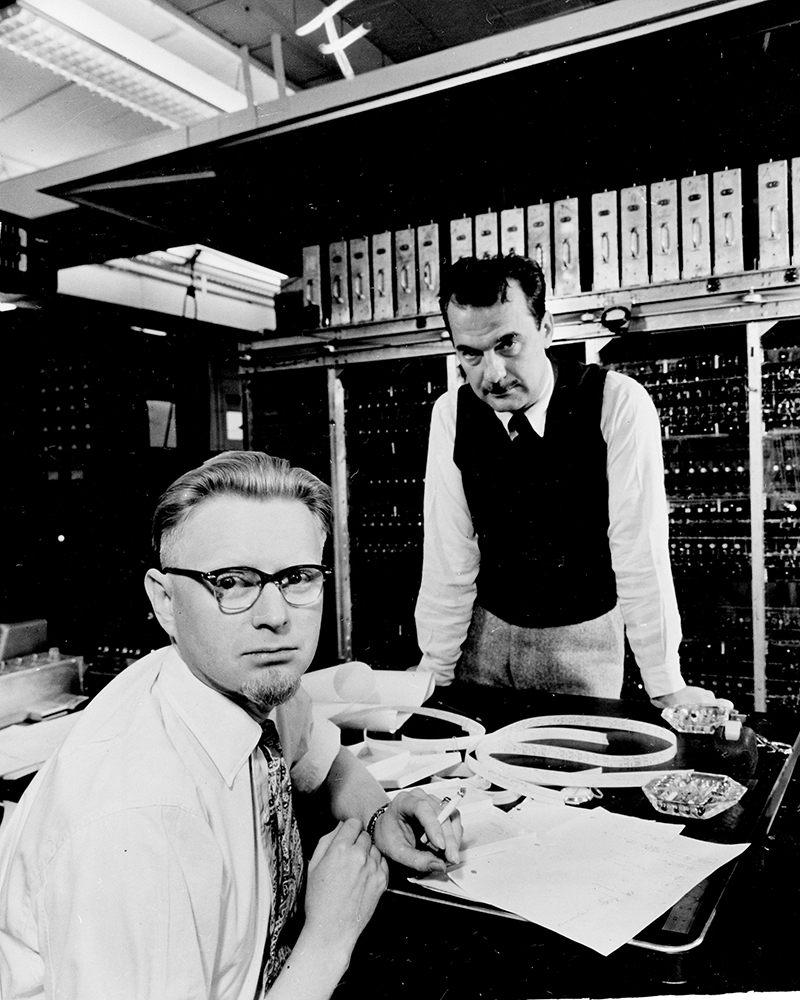
MANIAC project leader Nicholas Metropolis (standing) and the MANIAC's chief engineer Jim Richardson in 1953.

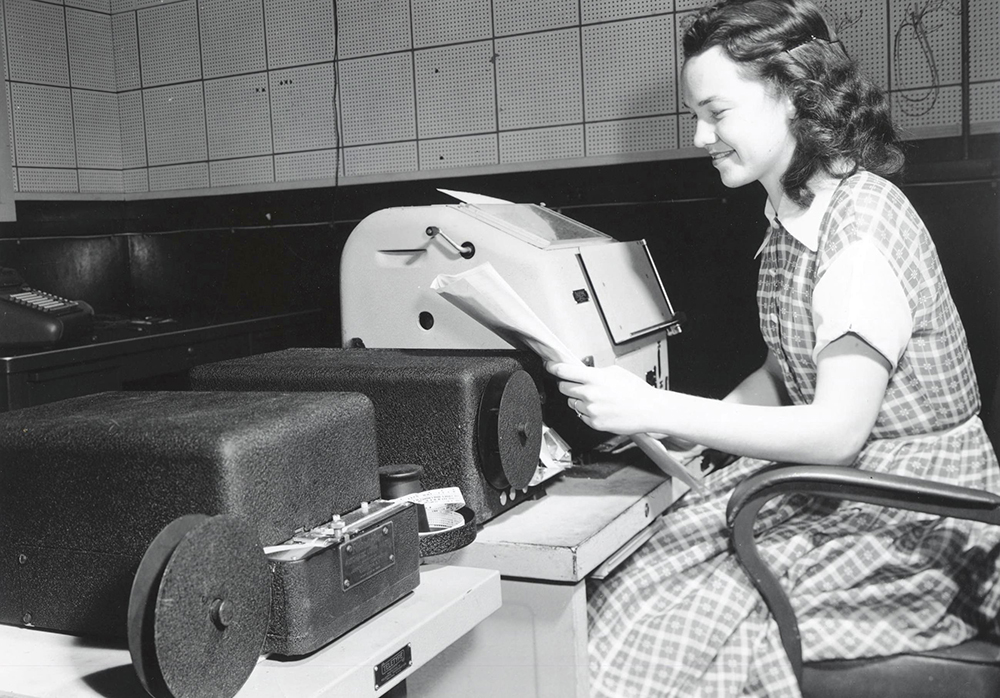
Marjory Jones (Devaney), a mathematician and programmer, is shown here in 1952, punching a program onto paper tape to be loaded into the MANIAC.

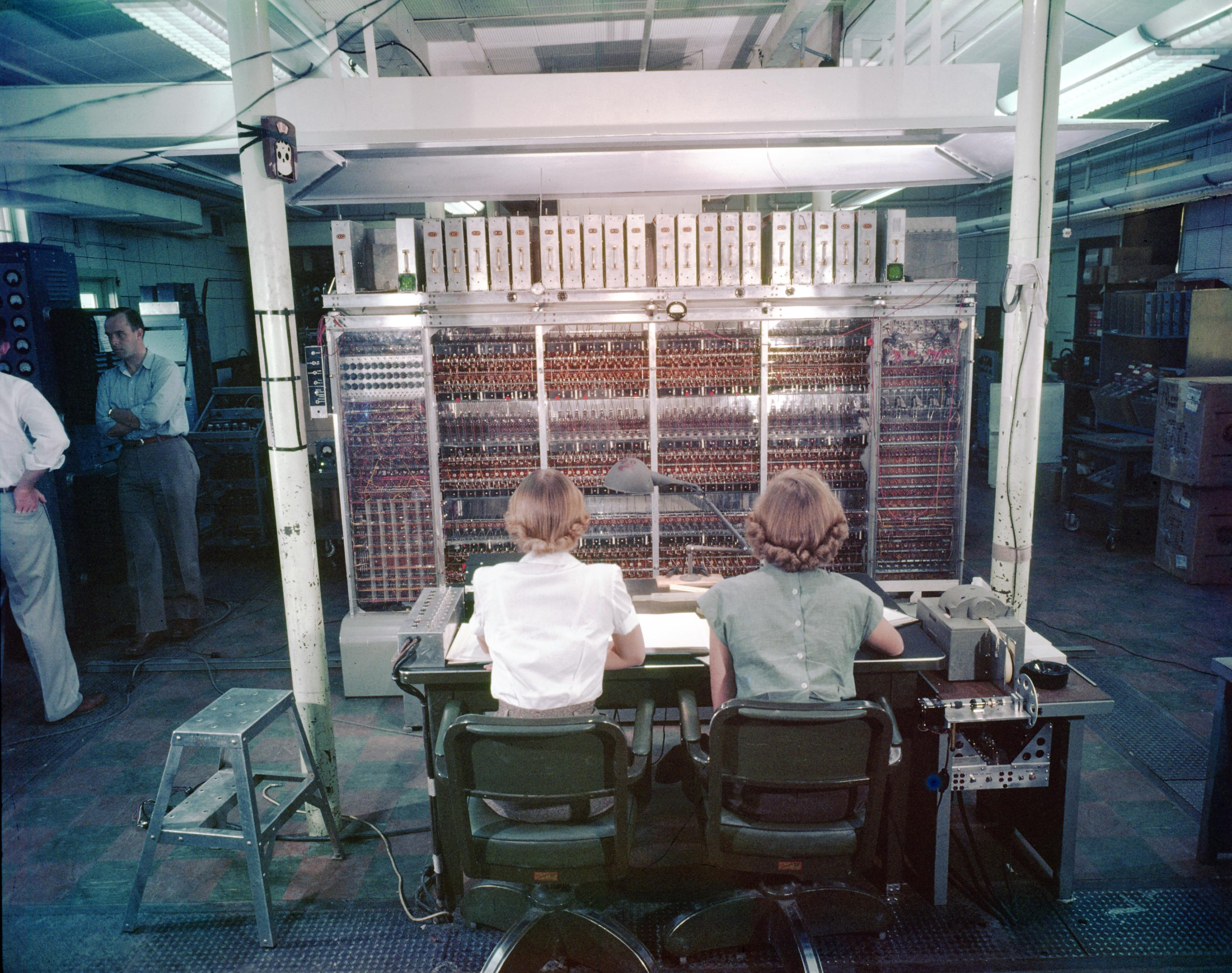
Operators are pictured here in 1952 in front of the MANIAC. The horseshoe on the pillar on the right was hung for luck.

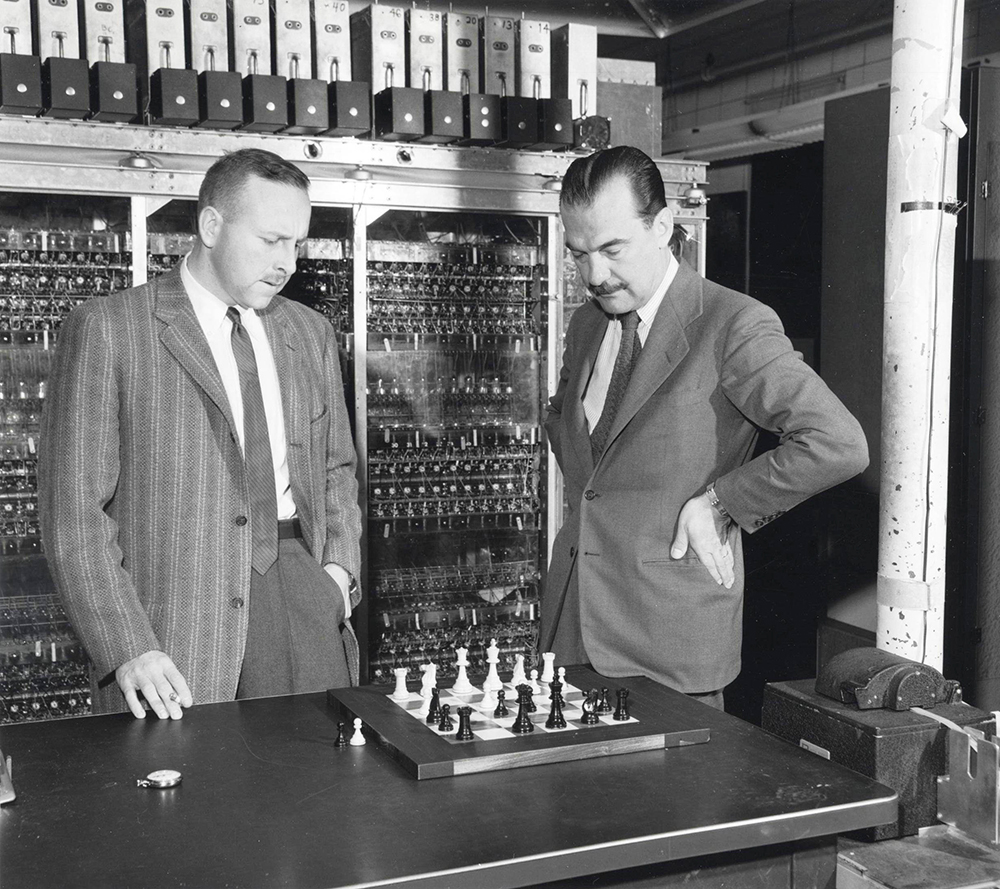
Paul Stein and Nicholas Metropolis play Los Alamos chess against the MANIAC, a simplified version of the game without bishops. The computer still needed about 20 minutes between moves.

== See also ==
- List of vacuum-tube computers
