= Joseph Ford (physicist) =

Personal details
- Born: Joseph Ford; December 18, 1927 Asheville, North Carolina, U.S.
- Died: April 26, 1995 (aged 67)
- Education: Georgia Tech (BS); Johns Hopkins University (Ph.D)

Joseph Ford (18 December 1927 – 26 April 1995) was Regents' Professor of physics at Georgia Institute of Technology specializing in thermodynamics and chaos theory.

== Early life and education ==
Born in Buncombe County, North Carolina, he was awarded a BS degree by the Georgia Institute of Technology in 1952 and a Ph.D in physics by Johns Hopkins University in 1956.

== Career ==
Ford spent two years as a research physicist at Union Carbide Corporation in Niagara Falls, New York before joining the faculty at the University of Miami in 1958. He was then appointed an associate professor at the Georgia Institute of Technology in 1961, rising to become Regents' Professor of Physics there in 1978, a position he held until his death in 1995.

He was elected a Fellow of the American Physical Society in 1989 "for pioneering contributions in classical and quantal chaos, and for fundamental and significant contributions to theory of statistical mechanics, ergodicity, and stochasticity, and chaos"

== Joseph Ford Commemorative Lectures ==
In 1995, the Georgia Institute of Technology School of Physics established the Joseph Ford Commemorative Lecture in honor of Ford's Memory.
