= Alive (Becca album) =

Alive!!

Studio album by Becca
- Released: November 5, 2008
- Genre: Pop rock
- Length: 50:06
- Label: Sony Music Entertainment Japan
- Producer: Meredith Brooks

Alive!! is the first full-length album by American singer-songwriter Becca, released in 2008.

== Track listing ==
All tracks produced by Meredith Brooks.

Alive!! – Standard edition
No.	Title	Writer(s)	Length
1.	"I'm Alive!"	Becca; Meredith Brooks; TABO	3:14
2.	"Better Off Alone"	Becca; Sinya.Saito	3:31
3.	"Turn to Stone"	Brooks; Guy Erez; Emerson Swinford	3:49
4.	"Lose You Now"	Brooks; Taylor Rhodes	4:38
5.	"Guilty Pleasure"	Becca; Brooks; Rob Daiker	3:39
6.	"Turn Up the Stereo"	Becca; Brooks; Dave Darling	3:21
7.	"Outside of You"	Pink; Chantal Kreviazuk; Raine Maida	4:18
8.	"Empty"	Becca	3:08
9.	"Without You"	Becca; Brooks; Chris Satriani	4:35
10.	"Make You Mad"	Becca; Brooks; Daiker	3:51
11.	"Perfect Me"	Becca; Brooks; Darling	3:41
12.	"Falling Down"	Brooks; Daiker	4:09
Total length:			50:06

Alive!! – Bonus track
No.	Title	Writer(s)	Length
13.	"I Drove All Night"	Billy Steinberg; Tom Kelly	4:09

Alive!! – DVD
No.	Title	Length
1.	"I'm Alive!" (music video)
2.	"Turn to Stone" (music video)
3.	"Perfect Me" (music video)
4.	"Guilty Pleasure" (animated music video)

== Personnel ==
- Becca – vocals
- Rob Daiker – bass, guitar, keyboards, backing vocals, Programming
- Joe Mengis- Drums
- Akira – Guitars
- Dave Darling – Guitars, Bass, Keyboards, Programming
- Yutaro – Bass
- Roger Carter – Drums
- Kenji Oshima – Drums
- Doarian Crozier – Drums
- Bob Lynn – Drums
- Christopher Camp – Bass (Live)
- Michael Lee – Piano, Hammond B3

== Production ==
- Producer: Meredith Brooks
- Executive Producers: Michihiko Nakayama, Sach Tsuchiya, Kazuhisa Saito
- Engineers: Rob Daiker, Dave Darling, Mark Needham, Chris Steffen
- Mixing: Mark Needham, Chris Satriani
- Mastering: Leon Zervos (Sterling Sound)
- Programming: Rob Daiker, Dave Darling
- Design: Takuya Nakashiro (BUCCI)
- Art Direction: Takuya Nakashiro (BUCCI)
- Photography: Makoto Okuguchi
