= MANIAC II =

Computer built in 1957 for Los Alamos Scientific Lab

The MANIAC II (Mathematical Analyzer Numerical Integrator and Automatic Computer Model II) is a first-generation electronic computer, that was built in 1957 for use at Los Alamos Scientific Laboratory.

MANIAC II was built by the University of California and the Los Alamos Scientific Laboratory and was completed in 1957 as a successor to MANIAC I. It used 2,850 vacuum tubes and 1,040 semiconductor diodes in the arithmetic unit. Overall it used 5,190 vacuum tubes, 3,050 semiconductor diodes, and 1,160 transistors.

It had 4,096 words of memory in magnetic-core memory (with 2.4 microsecond access time), supplemented by 12,288 words of memory using Williams tubes (with 15 microsecond access time). The word size was 48 bits. Its average multiplication time was 180 microseconds and the average division time was 300 microseconds.

By the time of its decommissioning, the computer was all solid-state, using a combination of RTL, DTL and TTL. It had an array multiplier, 15 index registers, 16K of 6-microsecond cycle time core memory, and 64K of 2-microsecond cycle time core memory. A NOP instruction took about 2.5 microseconds. A multiplication took 8 microseconds and a division 25 microseconds. It had a paging unit using 1K word pages with an associative 16-deep lookup memory. A 1-megaword CDC drum was hooked up as a paging device. It also had several ADDS Special-Order Direct-View Storage-Tube terminals. These terminals used an extended character set which covered about all the mathematical symbols, and allowed for half-line spacing for math formulas. For I/O, it had two IBM 360 series nine-track and two seven-track 1/2" tape drives. It had an eight-bit paper-tape reader and punch, and a 500 line-per-minute printer (1500 line-per-minute using the hexadecimal character set). Storage was three IBM 7000 series 1301 disk drives, each having two modules of 21.6 million characters apiece.

One of the data products of MANIAC II was the table of numbers appearing in the book The 3-j and 6-j Symbols by Manuel Rotenberg, et al., published in 1959. Page 37 of that book contains a brief description of the implementation of the program on the computer, and the I/O devices used in the production of the book.

== See also ==
- List of vacuum-tube computers
- MANIAC I
- MANIAC III
