= STS-132 =

2010 American crewed spaceflight to the ISS

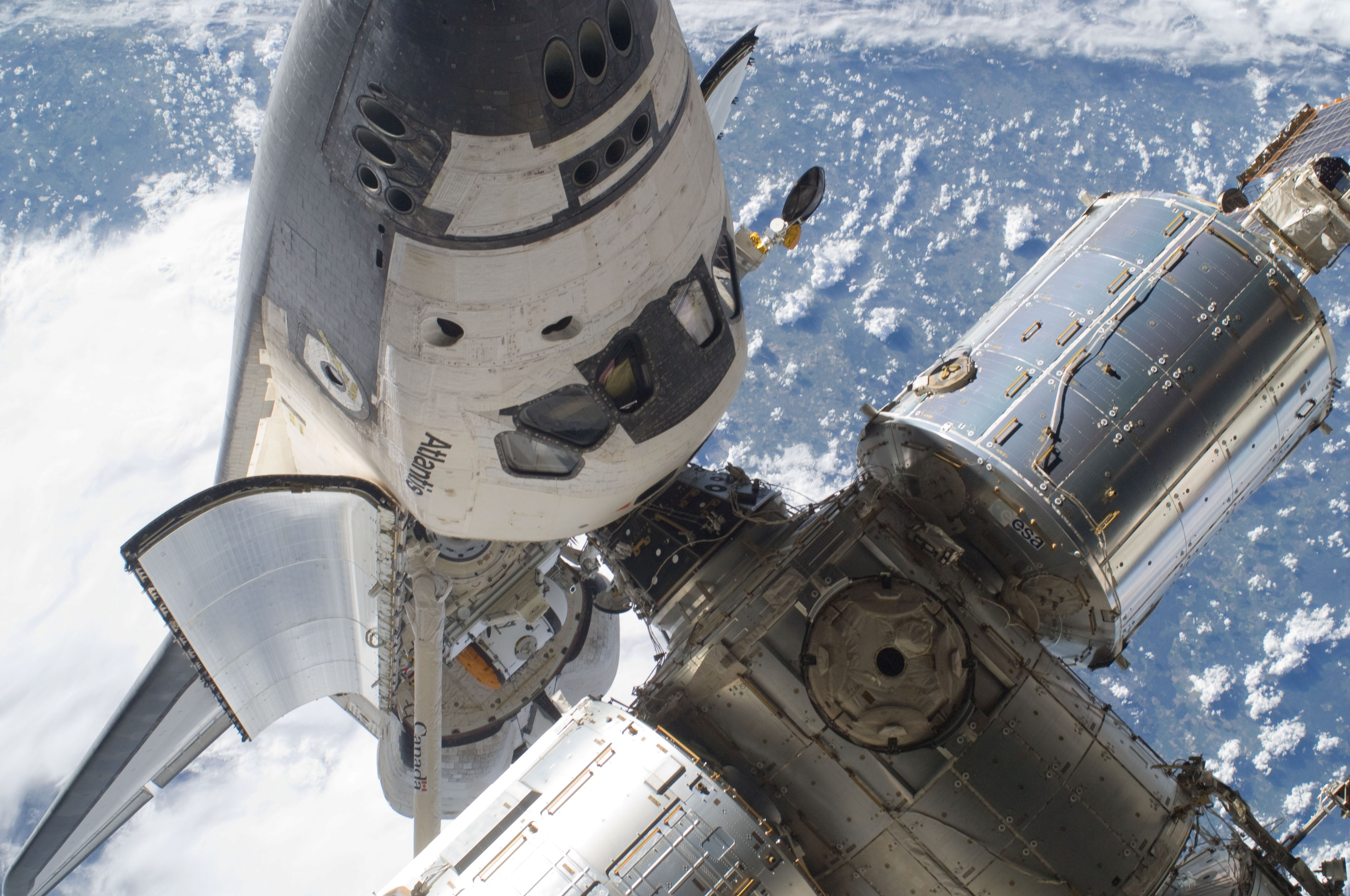
- Oblique view of Atlantis docked with the ISS, with Rassvet visible in its payload bay
- Names: Space Transportation System-132
- Mission type: ISS assembly
- Operator: NASA
- COSPAR ID: 2010-019A
- SATCAT no.: 36572
- Mission duration: 11 days, 18 hours, 29 minutes, 9 seconds
- Distance travelled: 7,853,563 kilometres (4,879,978 mi)
- Orbits completed: 186

Spacecraft properties
- Spacecraft: Space Shuttle Atlantis
- Launch mass: 119,300 kilograms (263,100 lb)
- Landing mass: 95,024 kilograms (209,491 lb)
- Payload mass: 12,072 kilograms (26,615 lb)

Crew
- Crew size: 6
- Members: Kenneth Ham; Dominic A. "Tony" Antonelli; Garrett Reisman; Michael T. Good; Stephen G. Bowen; Piers Sellers

Start of mission
- Launch date: May 14, 2010, 18:20 UTC
- Launch site: Kennedy, LC-39A

End of mission
- Landing date: May 26, 2010, 12:49:18 UTC
- Landing site: Kennedy, SLF Runway 33

Orbital parameters
- Reference system: Geocentric
- Regime: Low Earth
- Perigee altitude: 335 kilometres (208 mi)
- Apogee altitude: 359 kilometres (223 mi)
- Inclination: 51.6 degrees
- Period: 91 minutes

Docking with ISS
- Docking port: PMA-2 (Harmony forward)
- Docking date: May 16, 2010, 14:28 UTC
- Undocking date: May 23, 2010, 15:22 UTC
- Time docked: 7 days, 1 hour, 1 minute
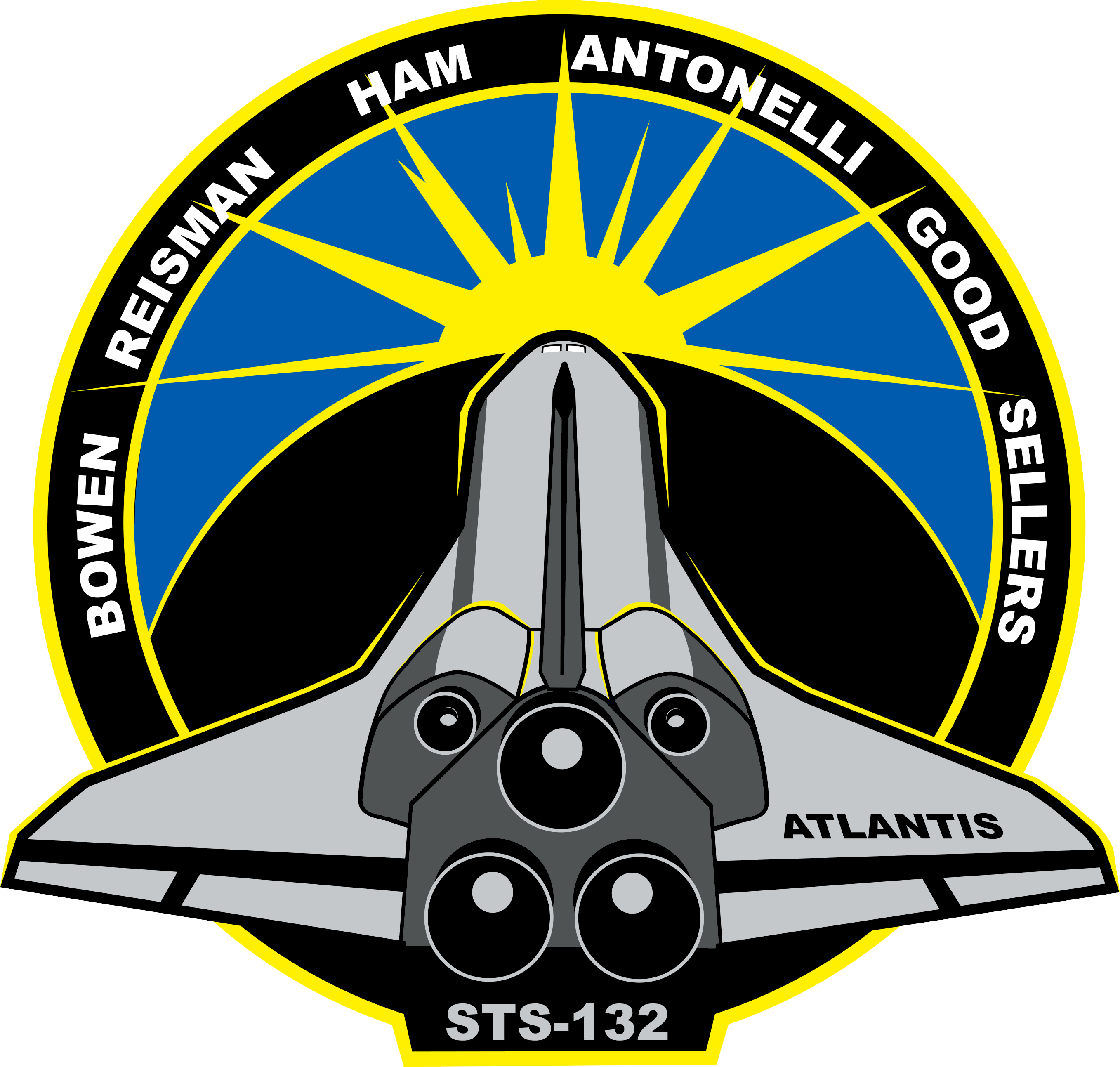
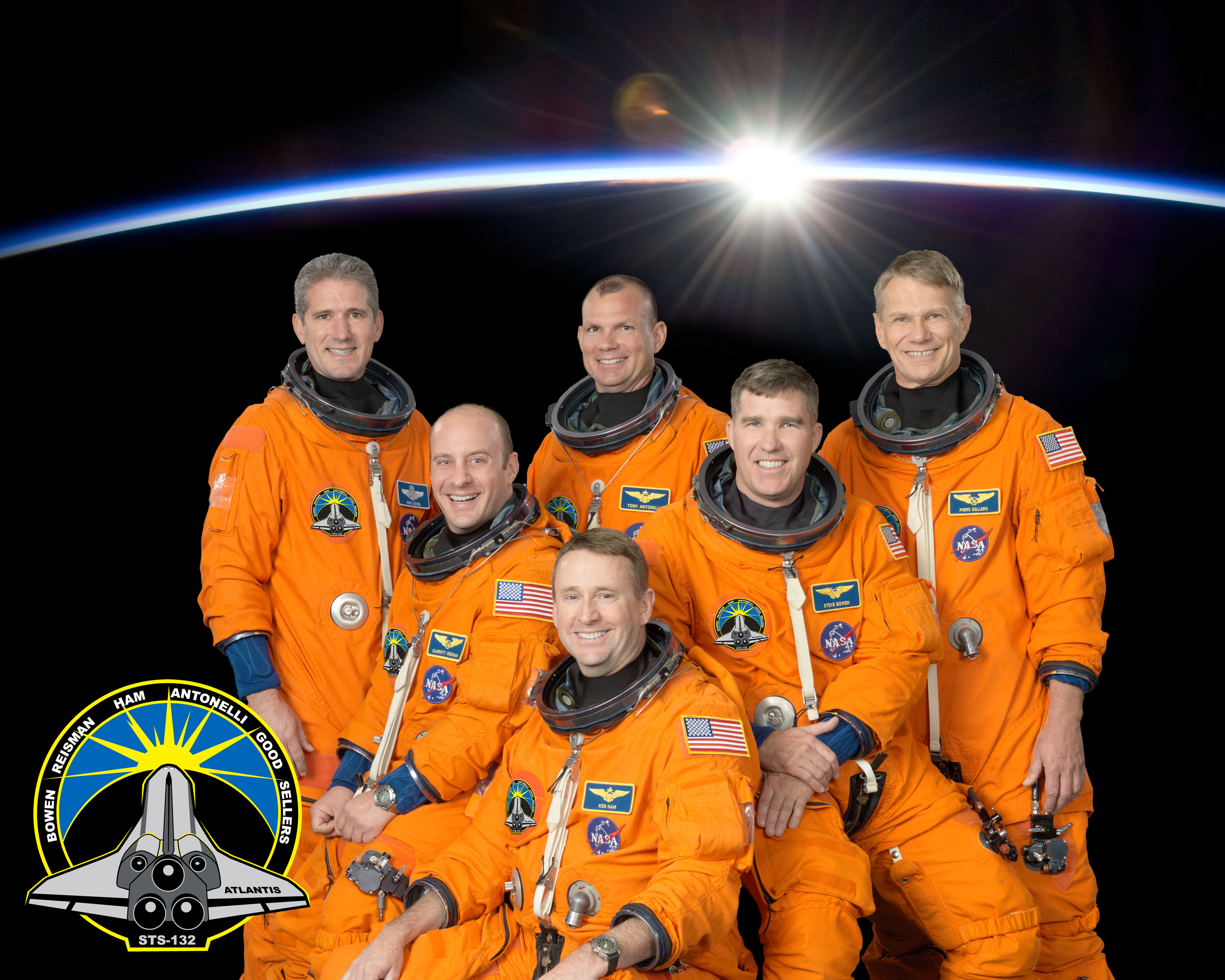
- Sitting: Ken Ham (center), Garrett Reisman (left), Stephen Bowen (Right), Standing: Michael Good, Tony Antonelli, Piers Sellers Space Shuttle program

STS-132 (ISS assembly flight ULF4) was a NASA Space Shuttle mission, during which Space Shuttle Atlantis docked with the International Space Station on May 16, 2010. STS-132 was launched from the Kennedy Space Center on May 14, 2010. The primary payload was the Russian Rassvet Mini-Research Module, along with an Integrated Cargo Carrier-Vertical Light Deployable (ICC-VLD). Atlantis landed at the Kennedy Space Center on May 26, 2010.

STS-132 was initially scheduled to be the final flight of Atlantis, provided that the STS-335/STS-135 Launch On Need rescue mission would not be needed. However, in February 2011, NASA declared that the final mission of Atlantis and of the Space Shuttle program, STS-135, would be flown regardless of the funding situation.

== Crew ==
Position	Crewmember
Commander	Kenneth Ham; Second and last spaceflight
Pilot	Dominic A. "Tony" Antonelli; Second and last spaceflight
Mission Specialist 1	Garrett Reisman; Second and last spaceflight
Mission Specialist 2 Flight Engineer	Michael T. Good; Second and last spaceflight
Mission Specialist 3	Stephen G. Bowen; Second spaceflight
Mission Specialist 4	Piers Sellers; Third and last spaceflight

=== Crew seat assignments ===
Seat	Launch	Landing	Seats 1–4 are on the flight deck. Seats 5–7 are on the mid-deck.
1	Ham		Seats 1–4 are on the flight deck. Seats 5–7 are on the mid-deck.
2	Antonelli		Seats 1–4 are on the flight deck. Seats 5–7 are on the mid-deck.
3	Reisman	Sellers	Seats 1–4 are on the flight deck. Seats 5–7 are on the mid-deck.
4	Good		Seats 1–4 are on the flight deck. Seats 5–7 are on the mid-deck.
5	Bowen		Seats 1–4 are on the flight deck. Seats 5–7 are on the mid-deck.
6	Sellers	Reisman	Seats 1–4 are on the flight deck. Seats 5–7 are on the mid-deck.
7	Unused		Seats 1–4 are on the flight deck. Seats 5–7 are on the mid-deck.

== Mission payload ==
Location	Cargo	Mass
Bays 1–2	Orbiter Docking System; EMU 3004 / EMU 3011 / EMU 3018	1,800 kilograms (4,000 lb); ~390 kilograms (860 lb)
Bay 3P	Shuttle Power; Distribution Unit (SPDU)	~17 kilograms (37 lb)
Bay 5P	Power & Data; Grapple Fixture (PDGF)	~71 kilograms (157 lb)
Bays 6–7	ICC-VLD carrier −6 Battery ORUs -SGANT antenna -EOTP platform	1,913 kilograms (4,217 lb); 1,020 kilograms (2,250 lb); 293 kilograms (646 lb); 191 kilograms (421 lb)
Bay 10P	ROEU 755 umbilical	90 kilograms (200 lb)
Bays 9–13	Rassvet Mini-Research Module 1 -Nauka Airlock -Nauka Radiator -ERA Elbow Joint -ERA Work Platform	6,295 kilograms (13,878 lb); 900 kilograms (2,000 lb); 570 kilograms (1,260 lb); 150 kilograms (330 lb); 100 kilograms (220 lb)
Starboard Sill	Orbiter Boom Sensor System	382 kilograms (842 lb)
Port Sill	Canadarm	410 kilograms (900 lb)
	Total:	14,592 kilograms (32,170 lb)

=== Mini-Research Module 1 (MRM 1) ===
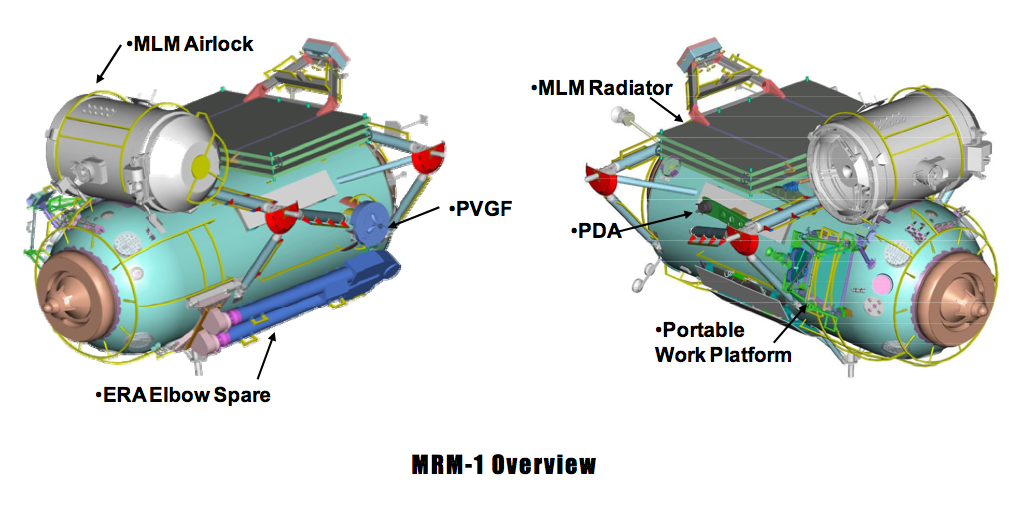
MRM-1 Rassvet docking module

STS-132 carried the Russian Rassvet Mini-Research Module 1 to the International Space Station. Rassvet means "dawn" in Russian. The module was built by Russian aerospace company Energia. Rassvet arrived at the Kennedy Space Center (KSC) aboard an Antonov 124 cargo plane on December 17, 2009, at about 13:00 EST. After it was unloaded from the Antonov, the module was transported to an Astrotech processing bay in Cape Canaveral to undergo preparations for launch.

An airlock and radiation heat exchanger to be used for outfitting the Russian Nauka Module (launched in 2021), a spare elbow part of the European Robotic Arm (ERA) and a portable work platform for science hardware for performing experiments in outer space were externally mounted on Rassvet in its launch configuration. Russian and US cargo to be delivered were also accommodated inside the module. The volume for cargo and science inside MRM1 is 5 cubic meters. Rassvet was outfitted with ISS standard grapple fixtures that allowed the module to be unloaded from the payload bay of Atlantis using the station's robotic arm.

=== Integrated Cargo Carrier-Vertical Light Deployable (ICC-VLD2) ===
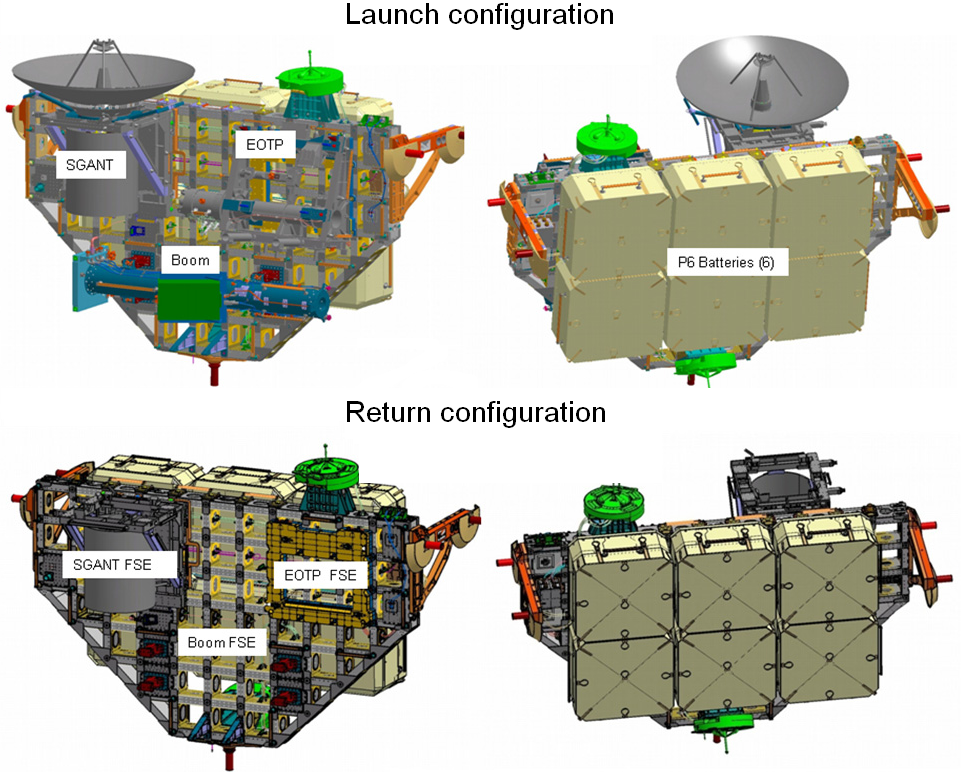
ICC-VLD2 launch and return configurations

Also on board Atlantis was the Integrated Cargo Carrier-Vertical Light Deployable (ICC-VLD2) pallet, holding a K_{u}-band Space to Ground Antenna (SGANT), the SGANT boom assembly, an Enhanced Orbital replacement Unit (ORU) Temporary Platform (EOTP) for the Canadian Dextre robotic arm extension, Video and Power Grapple fixtures (PVGF) and six new battery ORUs. The six new batteries replaced older ones on the P6 truss of the ISS. The old batteries were placed on the ICC-VLD pallet for return to Earth. The EOTP was built by MacDonald, Dettwiler and Associates Ltd. (MDA) of Brampton, Ontario, Canada, for NASA.

The ICC pallet is constructed of aluminum. It is approximately 8 feet (2.4 m) long, 13 feet (4.0 m) wide and 10 inches thick. The empty weight of the pallet is 2,645 pounds. The total weight of ICC–VLD and the ORUs is approximately 8,330 pounds. ICC-VLD return mass is 2,933 kilograms (6,466 lb).

The ICC-VLD was berthed in the center of the shuttle's payload bay for both launch and reentry.

=== Other items ===
In addition to the standard Official Flight Kit (OFK) flown inside a locker on the mid-deck, two Light Weight Tool Stowage Assemblies were modified to fly memorabilia and then were stowed to the left and right of Atlantis' airlock in the shuttle's payload bay.

A compact disk (CD) containing the digital copies of all entries submitted to NASA's Space Shuttle Program Commemorative Patch Contest was also flown aboard Atlantis. The contest was organized by the Space Shuttle Program to mark the end of the shuttle era. The winning patch was designed by Blake Dumesnil of Hamilton Sundstrand, Johnson Space Center. A panel of NASA judges, including shuttle program manager John Shannon, LeRoy Cain, and three other shuttle program managers including former astronaut John Casper, selected the winning patch from a pool of 85 entries by NASA employees and contractors.

Seventeen handcrafted beads made by nine different artists across North America were also on board Atlantis during the STS-132 mission. NASA teamed up with Beads of Courage, Inc., an approved public charity to bring hope and inspiration to children coping with serious illnesses through the Beads in Space project (the idea of Jamie Newton, an employee at the Marshall Space Flight Center). The 17 beads weigh eight ounces and were selected after a contest organized by Beads of Courage that attracted 54 beads.

Also on board Atlantis was a 4-inch long wood sample of Sir Isaac Newton's apple tree. The piece from the original tree that supposedly inspired Newton's theory of gravity, along with a picture of Newton, were taken into orbit by astronaut Piers Sellers. The wood is part of the collection of the Royal Society archives in London, and was returned there following the flight.

Additionally, a flag from Clarkson University, Potsdam, New York, flew on board shuttle Atlantis. It was there in honor of STS-132 lead shuttle flight director, Michael L. Sarafin, who is an alumnus of the Clarkson University.

A comprehensive list of STS-132 items that were carried aboard Atlantis and their descriptions can be found in the Official Flight Kit.

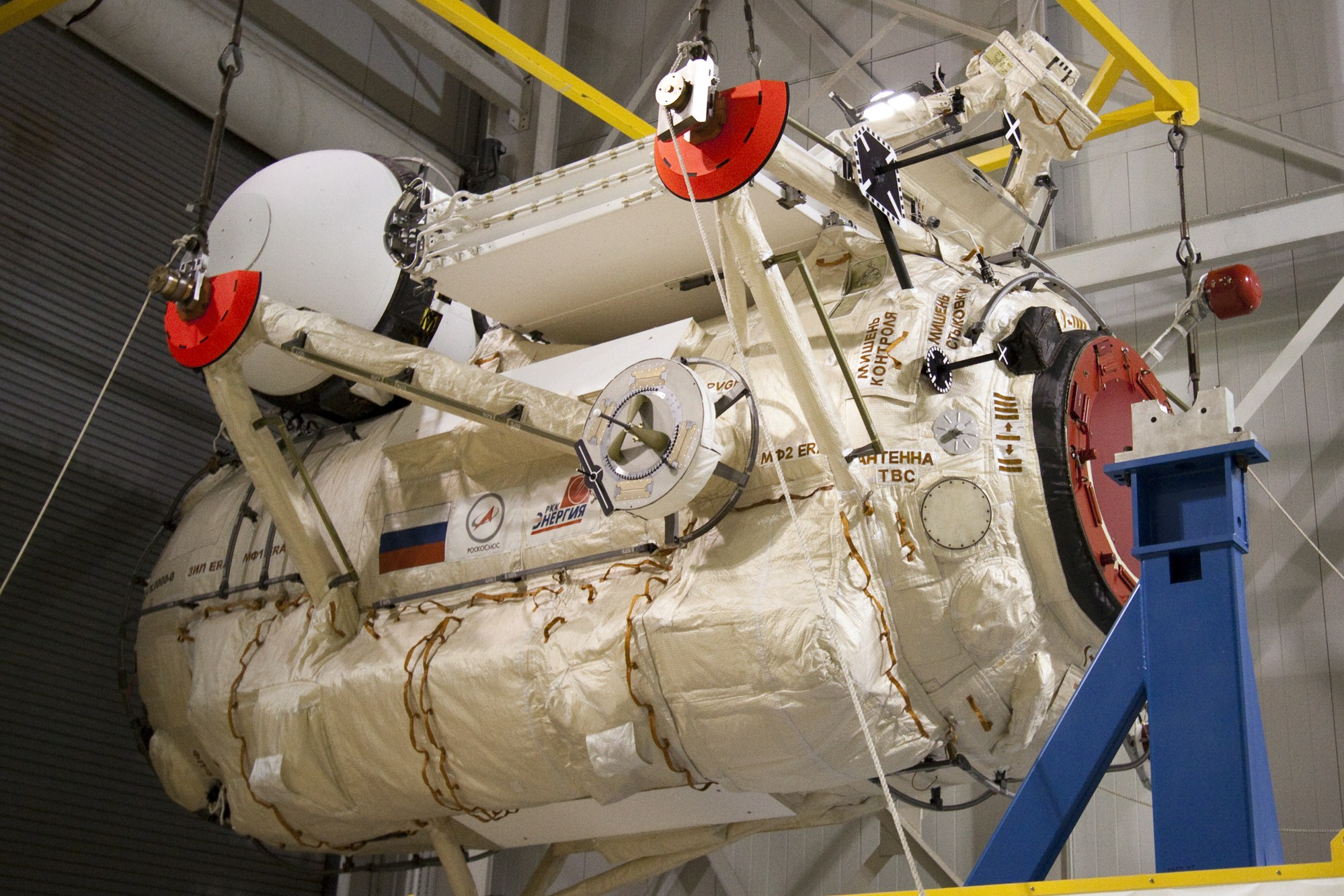
MRM 1 in the Space Station Processing Facility (SSPF) at Kennedy Space Center.

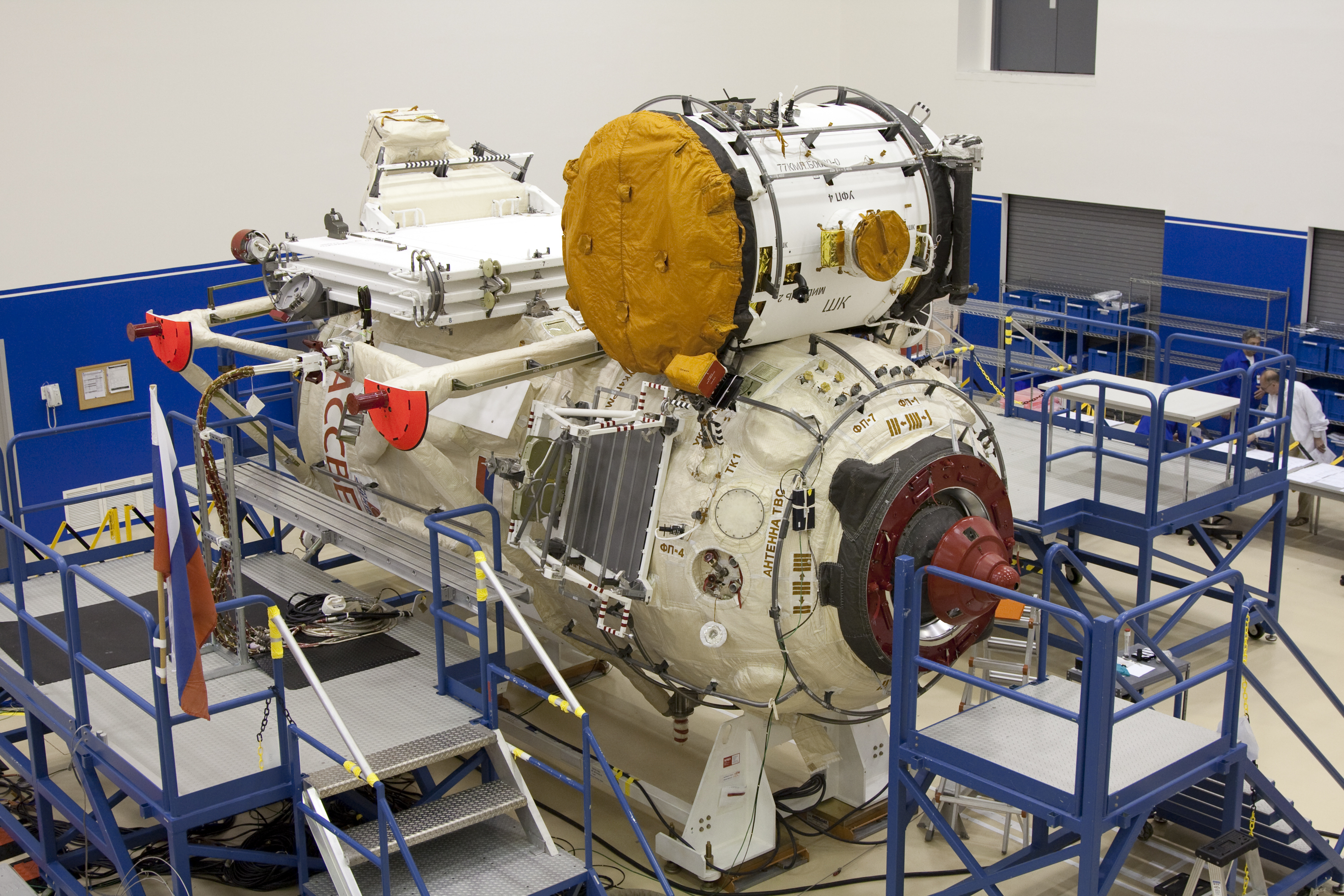
MRM 1 in the Astrotech payload processing facility.

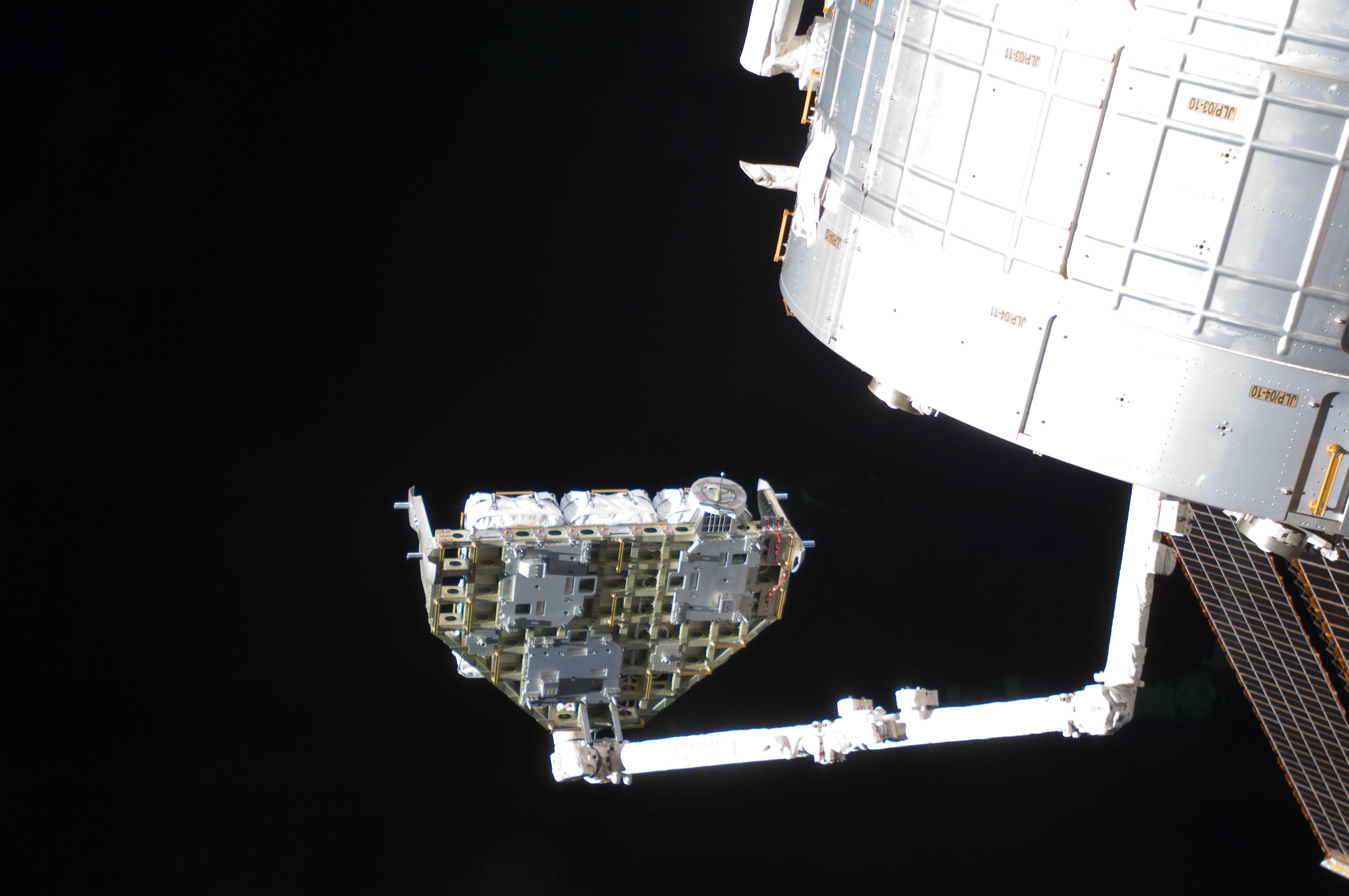
ICC-VLD was first carried on STS-127 in July 2009.

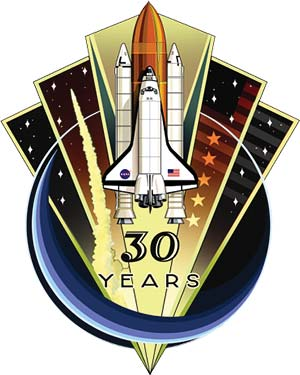
Winner of the Space Shuttle Program Commemorative Patch Contest

== Mission background and milestones ==
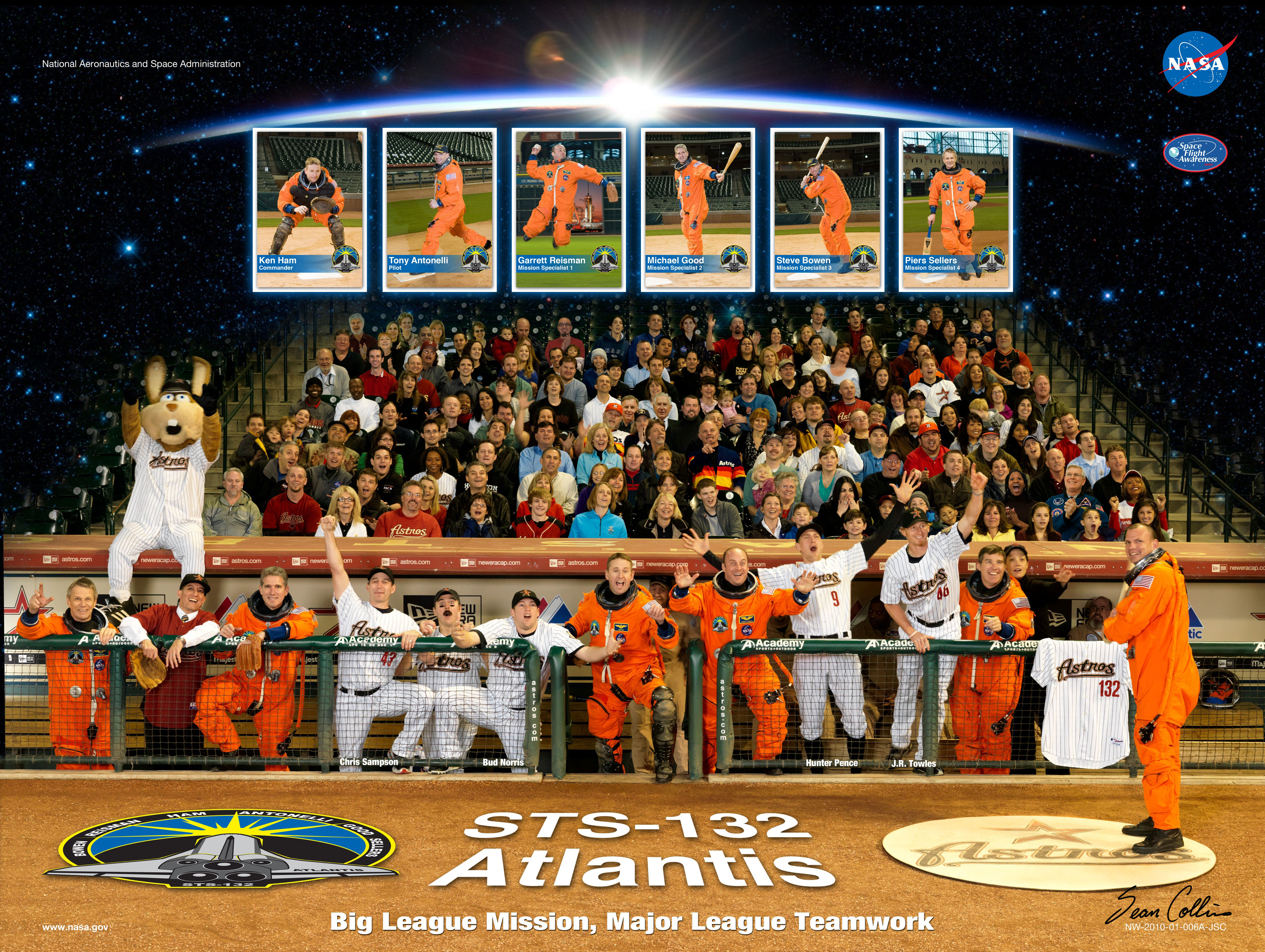
Mission poster

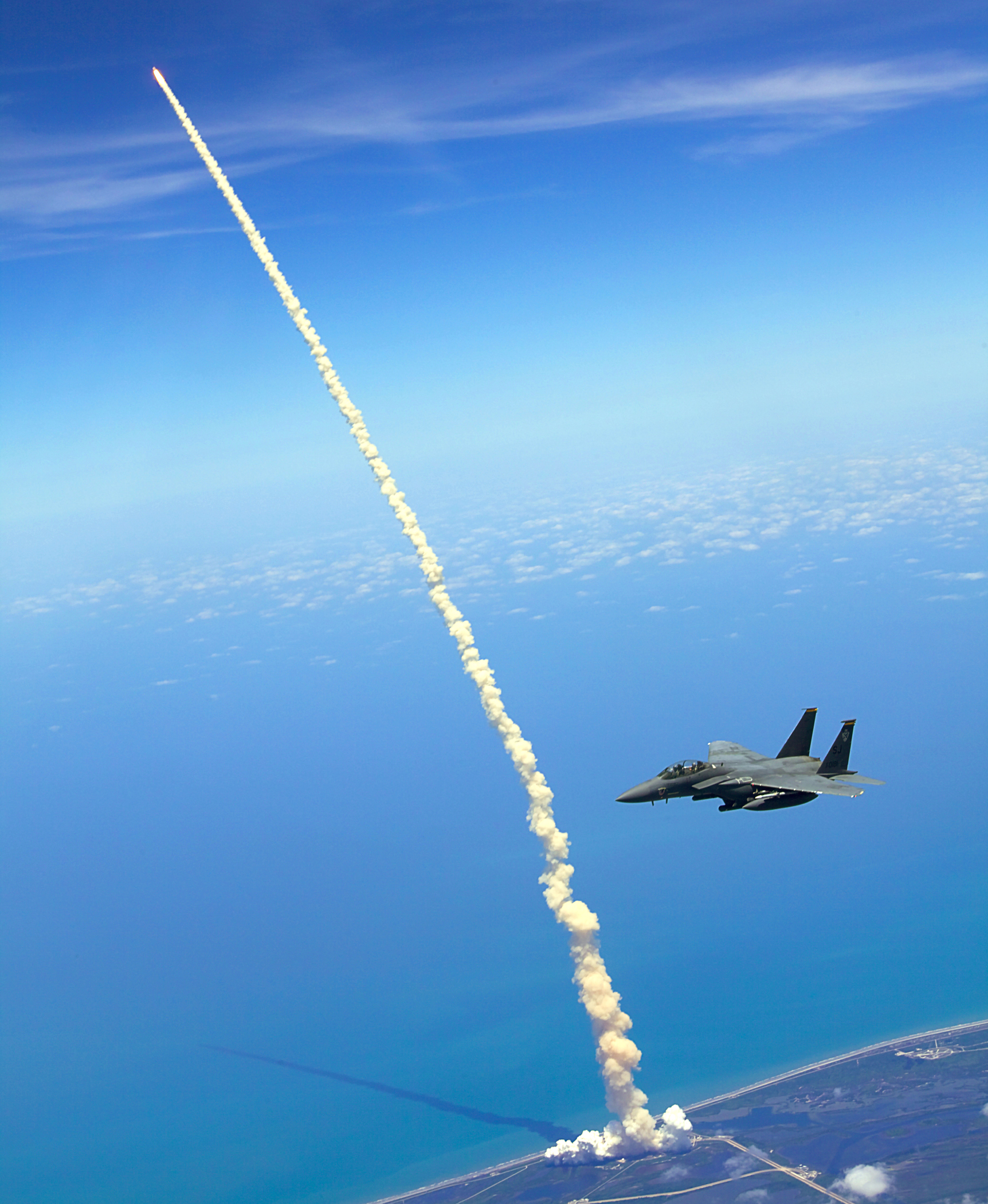
Atlantis heads into space while a pair of F-15E Strike Eagle jets patrols the skies over Kennedy Space Center.

The mission marked:

- 163rd NASA crewed space flight
- 132nd shuttle mission since STS-1
- 32nd flight of Atlantis
- 34th shuttle mission to the ISS
- 11th flight of Atlantis to the ISS
- 3rd shuttle flight in 2010
- 107th post-Challenger mission
- 19th post-Columbia mission

NASA arranged a Tweetup to cover the launch of the STS-132 mission. 150 people attended the event from more than 30 US states, the District of Columbia, Puerto Rico, Belgium, the Netherlands, New Zealand and the United Kingdom. The Tweetup participants met with shuttle technicians, managers, engineers and astronauts, took a tour of the Kennedy Space Center and viewed the launch of Atlantis.

== Mission experiments ==
Atlantis crew worked with several short-term experiments during their mission. The shuttle transported new long-term experiments to the ISS. At the end of the mission, Atlantis returned some of the completed experiments from the ISS.

Short-term experiments included:

- Micro-2: Researchers from Rensselaer Polytechnic Institute sent microorganisms to investigate new ways of preventing the formation and spread of clusters of bacteria (biofilms), that could pose a threat to the health of astronauts. After the shuttle landed, the resulting biofilms were examined to see how their growth and development were impacted by microgravity.
- Hypersole: Hypersole is a Canadian research project that plans to investigate sudden changes in skin sensitivity experienced by some astronauts in space. The researchers hope to understand more about how the skin sensitivity of the soles of the feet affect the human balance. Three STS-132 crew members participated in identical trials before the launch and immediately upon landing. The trials were also repeated on five astronauts scheduled to fly on the STS-133 and STS-134 missions. Project findings are expected to add significant knowledge to existing studies of aging and to be beneficial for the elderly and people who suffer from balance problems.
- Shuttle Ionospheric Modification with Pulsed Localized Exhaust Experiments (SIMPLEX) – STS-132 crew performed the SIMPLEX burn on Flight Day 12. The experiment investigates plasma turbulence driven by shuttle exhaust in the ionosphere using ground-based radars. The processes by which chemical releases can produce plasma turbulence are quantified with the SIMPLEX measurements. Plasma turbulence can affect military navigation and communications using radio systems.

== Shuttle processing ==
The mission's external tank, ET-136, began its 900-mile (1,400 km), six-day journey across the Gulf of Mexico from NASA's Michoud Assembly Facility in New Orleans, Louisiana, on February 24, 2010. ET-136 measured 154 feet (47 m) long and 28 feet (8.5 m) in diameter. The solid rocket booster retrieval ship Liberty Star towed the ET in the enclosed barge Pegasus. After docking in the turn basin at the Kennedy Space Center, the tank was offloaded and driven to the Vehicle Assembly Building (VAB) on March 1, 2010.

On March 29, 2010, workers attached ET-136 to its solid rocket boosters. A crane lifted the ET into high bay No. 1 inside the VAB. The day-long process was completed around 18:00 EDT, as the tank was bolted to Atlantis's twin solid rocket boosters.

Atlantis rolled out of its processing bay (OPF-1) around 07:00 EDT on April 13, 2010. The shuttle entered the VAB around 11:00 EDT for attachment to its external tank and solid rocket boosters. Given that this was at the time believed to be Atlantis' final rollover for a mission, the shuttle stopped for several hours en route to the VAB, allowing engineers and technicians to pose for photographs with the orbiter. The rollover occurred exactly 25 years after Atlantis first arrived at the Kennedy Space Center, after a cross-country trip from the shuttle factory in Palmdale, California. The path to the rollover was without any incidents of major concern, with only 22 Interim Problem Reports (IPRs) noted during Atlantis' flow since its return from the STS-129 mission in November 2009.

The transport canister containing the STS-132 payload arrived at Pad 39A on April 15, 2010, ahead of Atlantis' rollover to the launch pad. The canister was shaped like the shuttle's 60-foot (18 m)-long payload bay. Packed inside it were the MRM-1 module and the cargo-carrying pallet ICC-VLD.

Space Shuttle Atlantis began its rollout to launch pad 39A at 23:31 EDT on April 21, 2010. The complete shuttle stack and mobile launch platform were secured to the launch pad's structure at 6:03 EDT on April 22, 2010. The 3.4 mi (5.5 kilometres (3.4 mi)) trek took 6 hours and 32 minutes to complete. The rollout was originally planned for the evening of April 19, 2010, but wet weather and thunderstorms on the Space Coast caused several delays.

STS-132's payload was installed in the shuttle's cargo bay on April 25, 2010.

Pad engineers preparing Atlantis had noticed paint peeling from shuttle's main payload, the MRM-1 module. Although the problem was declared to have no impact on the operation of MRM-1, it holds a potential threat of releasing debris on orbit. Engineers also noted MRM-1 cycled its Fire and Smoke detector self test several times. Similar events occurred during Atlantis' STS-129 mission in November 2009 when Shuttle and Station crew were awakened consecutive nights by false depressurization and fire alarms that originated from the MRM-2 (Poisk) module.

An agency-wide Flight Readiness Review (FRR) was held at KSC in Florida on May 5, 2010, to discuss Atlantis' launch preparations. At the end of the review, top NASA managers made the decision to officially set the launch for May 14, 2010, at 14:20 EDT. NASA held a post news conference to brief about the results of the FRR. The briefing was broadcast on NASA TV and was attended by NASA's Associate Administrator for Space Operations, William Gerstenmaier, Space Shuttle Program Manager John Shannon and Space Shuttle Launch Director, Michael Leinbach. Shannon mentioned that, firstly, ceramic inserts around Atlantis' windows and forward rocket pod were tested after an insert loosened during Discovery's re-entry on STS-131, posing a potential impact threat. The inserts had been re-installed on to Atlantis using a thicker braided cord to reduce the chances of a backing out. Secondly, it was mentioned that engineers had reviewed work to confirm that all systems on Atlantis' K_{u} band antenna were in place. The testing had been provoked after the failure of that communication system during STS-131. Mr. Leinbach also acknowledged the skills and experience of the engineering teams and thanked the engineers who had successfully resolved hypergolic loading issues. Hypergolics are chemicals that ignite when they come in contact with each other. The propellants are used in the reaction control system that steers the shuttle in space.

A booster rocket segment that had first flown 25 years before on Atlantis' maiden flight (STS-51-J) was used to help fly STS-132. The aft dome on the left solid rocket booster that lifted off to support Atlantis' STS-132 mission first launched STS-51-J on October 3, 1985. Including STS-132, 18 of Atlantis' 32 flights were represented by the boosters' segments.

=== Launch preparations ===
Atlantis' astronauts traveled from Johnson Space Center, Houston to the KSC launch site on May 10, 2010, to prepare for the launch. The crew, arriving in four Northrop T-38 Talon jets, landed on the Shuttle Landing Facility around 18:49 EDT.

The official countdown to liftoff started on May 11, 2010, after the countdown clocks at KSC were activated at 16:00 EDT, ticking backward from the T-43-hour mark.

Program managers completed the L-2 Mission Management Team (MMT) meeting on May 12, 2010. At the end of the 18-minute-long meeting management team officially cleared Atlantis for launch. NASA held a pre-launch news conference to reveal the outcomes of the MMT and to brief the press on the upcoming launch. The news conference was attended by Chair, pre-launch mission management team, Mike Moses, Mike Leinbach and STS-132 weather officer, Todd McNamara. The weather officer spoke of a favorable launch weather forecast due to a high pressure weather pattern and despite a low cloud ceiling, calling a 70 percent chance of favorable conditions at launch time. He further elaborated on the predicted weather conditions at the Transoceanic Abort Landing (TAL) sites: Zaragoza and Moron in Spain, and Istres, France, in case of an emergency.

The Space Shuttle Program MMT met at 04:15 EDT on May 14, 2010, and gave a go to begin loading Atlantis' ET with liquid oxygen and liquid hydrogen. The fuel tanking operation began on time at 04:55 EDT and was completed within three hours at 07:56 EDT, with replenishment fuel being added throughout the countdown.

Crew preparations for the launch day began at 05:00 EDT following an eight-hour overnight sleep. An hour later they completed their final medical check ups. Crew suiting began around 10:00 EDT and the astronauts departed for the launch pad at 10:30 EDT. At around 11:00 EDT, first Commander Ham ingressed the shuttle first and strapped into his seat, followed by pilot Antonelli, Mission Specialists Bowen, Sellers, Reisman and Good in order. Inside the orbiter, all six astronauts performed checks with ground controllers to verify that communications links work properly. With all astronauts on board, Atlantis' hatch was closed and latched for the flight. Inside the White Room, the closeout crew finished their job by pressurizing the crew cabin and checking for leaks before leaving the pad.

Launch day countdown procedures went without any major problems; however, Atlantis encountered two minor issues. The Final Inspection Team looking for ice and frost buildup on the ET had spotted a small stress fracture on an umbilical strut. Later, during the post-launch news conference, the chair of NASA's pre-launch mission management team, Mike Moses, said that this was not unusual. Engineers also resolved any concerns about a loose ball bearing found near the shuttle's payload bay days earlier. The bearing was determined to likely be from a camera system, and was ultimately ruled out as a concern.

== Mission timeline ==
=== May 14 (Flight Day 1 – Launch) ===
The Space Shuttle external tank falls away (1 min 16 secs)

Launch video (9 mins 57 secs)

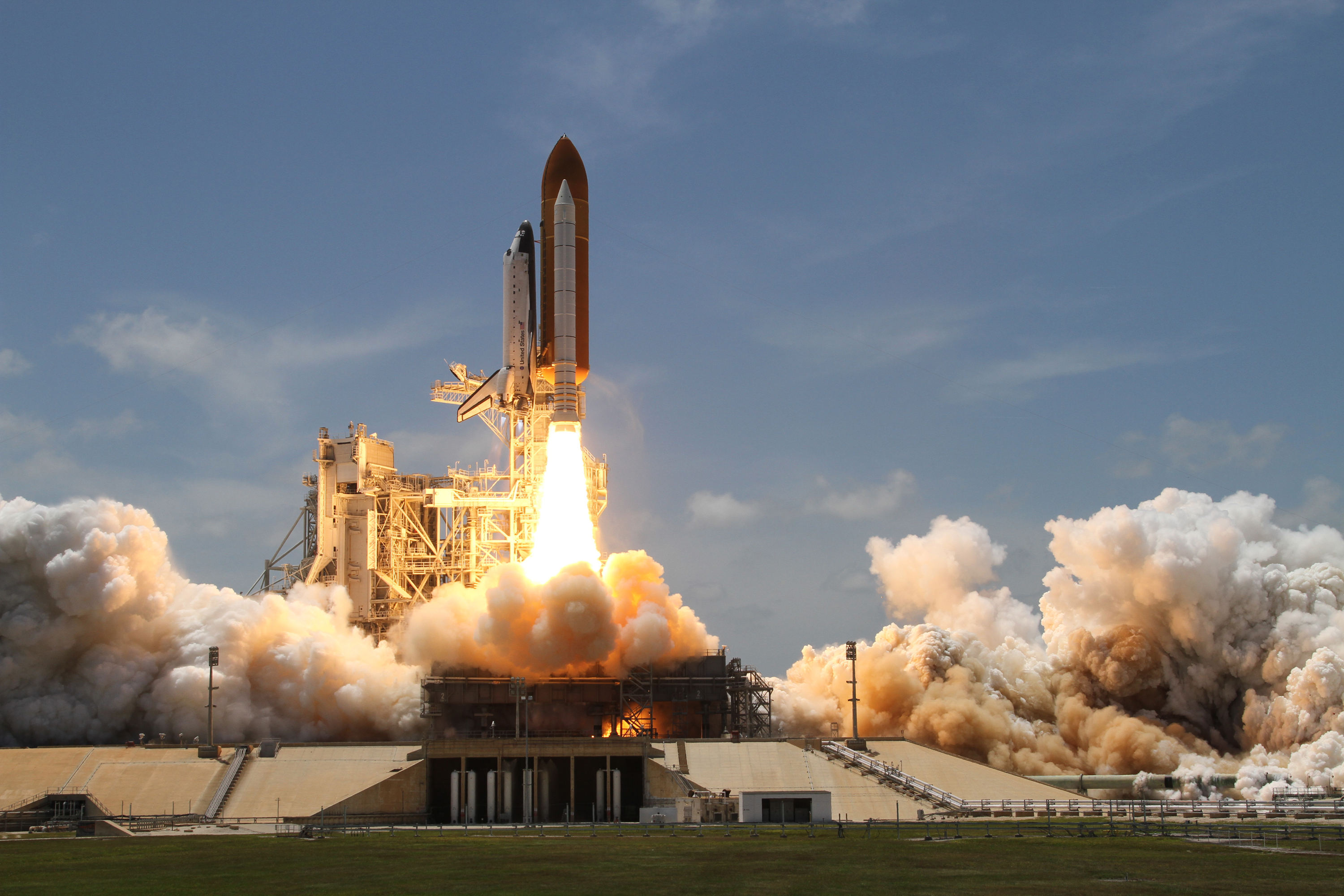
Space Shuttle Atlantis launches from Kennedy Space Center, May 14, 2010.

The launch of Space Shuttle Atlantis occurred on time at 18:20 UTC, with launch commentator George Diller saying that the shuttle was "reaching the crest of its historic achievements in space". Powered flight conformed to the standard timeline, with main engine cutoff (MECO) occurring at 8 minutes and 32 seconds Mission Elapsed Time (MET). The External Tank, ET-136, separated from the shuttle 15 seconds later at 8:47 MET. A further boost from the Orbital Maneuvering System (OMS) engines was not required due to the nominal MECO, and Atlantis settled into its planned preliminary orbit. A subsequent NC-1 engine firing of about 26 seconds adjusted the orbital path of the shuttle to match that of the International Space Station (ISS), by altering the shuttle's velocity by about 41 ft/s (12 m/s).

NASA held a post-launch news conference with Bill Gerstenmaier, Alexey Krasnov (chief of the Piloted Programs Directorate at the Russian Federal Space Agency), Mike Moses and Mike Leinbach. During the conference, Gerstenmaier made mention of a piece of space junk that could potentially have impacted Atlantis' planned arrival at the ISS.

More than 39,000 guests, including television host David Letterman, Apollo astronaut Buzz Aldrin, and former NASA administrator Michael Griffin, witnessed the launch. The Russian deputy prime minister, Sergei Ivanov, and the head of the Russian Space Federal Agency, Anatoly Perminov, were also present at KSC.

Once in orbit, the crew opened the shuttle's payload bay doors, activated the radiators and deployed the K_{u} band antenna successfully. They also completed a checkout of the orbiter's Shuttle Remote Manipulator System (SRMS). The crew was also successful in downlinking all imagery from Atlantis' umbilical well cameras, along with crew video of ET-136, for review by imagery experts in the ground. Preliminary inspections showed that ET-136 was very clean and had performed well during the ascent, with only a few foam liberation incidents visible.

The launch of Atlantis on STS-132 was supposed to be its last. The mission patch depicted Atlantis flying into the sunset as she retired, and the Space Shuttle Program patches on sale at the Kennedy Space Center for the launch showed the years 1981–2010 for the program. The programme guide magazine to the launch also cited the launch as the final flight of Space Shuttle Atlantis. However, on its return Atlantis was readied as a rescue shuttle for the (at that time) two remaining missions of STS-133 and STS-134. It could be launched on need if there was a problem and if not, it would be stood down. Then, later in 2010, NASA decided to fly the previously provision STS-135 mission and chose Atlantis for the flight given that Discovery and Endeavour were earmarked for STS-133 and STS-134 respectively. The funding was found and a decision was taken to fly STS-135 as the final Space Shuttle mission, with Atlantis as the orbiter. The STS-135 mission launched in July 2011, just over a year after Atlantis's launch on the STS-132 mission.

=== May 15 (Flight Day 2 – TPS survey) ===
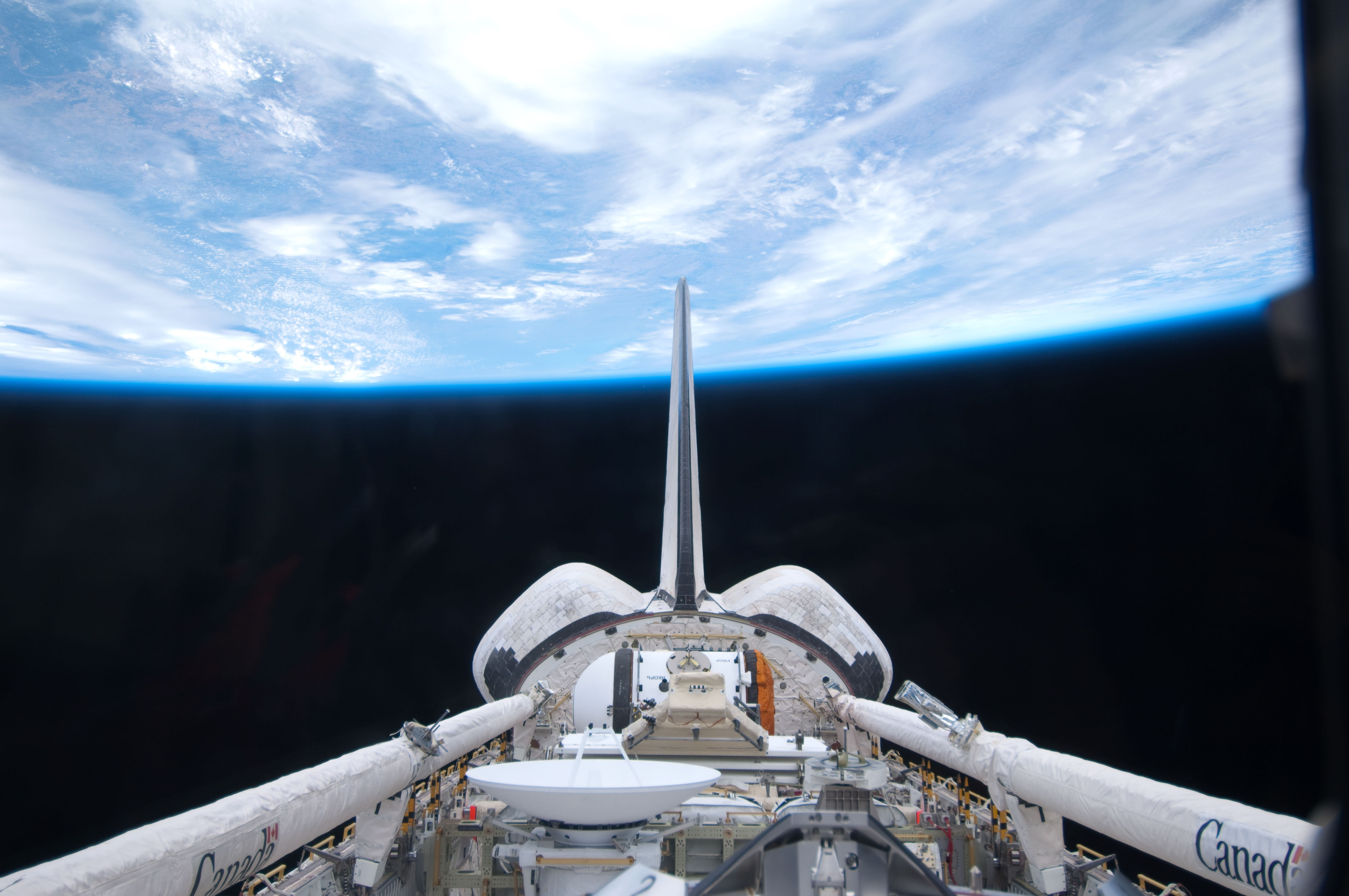
Atlantis' cargo bay and its vertical stabilizer

The crew members aboard Atlantis began their first full day in space at 08:20 UTC. The day was primarily devoted to inspecting Atlantis' thermal protection system, using the shuttle's robotic arm and the Orbiter Boom Sensor System (OBSS) to look for any signs of launch damage. Before the thermal protection checkout began, the crew encountered a problem with the Laser Dynamic Range Imager (LDRI) and the Intensified TV Camera (ITVC), due to a snagged cable in that system's pan and tilt unit. As a result, Mission Control decided to switch to the less-capable backup sensor system: sensor package 2, a laser camera and a digital camera mounted near the end of the OBSS. Sensor package 2 required an additional light source (such as daylight), had a resolution of a few millimeters and could scan at about 2.5 inches per second. The crew followed "late inspection" procedures for surveying, and images of the right wing, the nose cap and much of the left wing were sent to the ground for detailed analysis.

Commander Kenneth Ham installed the center-line camera in the Orbiter Docking System (ODS) to help him during Atlantis' approach to the ISS. Down on the shuttle's middeck, Good and Bowen spent several hours checking out spacesuits and preparing them for transfer to the station. Reisman spent much of his day working with Antonelli and Ham on the TPS survey. He also assisted with the suit and spacewalk equipment checkouts. The crew furthermore performed the ODS ring extension that would connect the shuttle's docking port to the station's Harmony module. The last portion of the crew's day was spent preparing and checking out all of the tools to be used during the rendezvous.

Two course correction burns were also performed on Flight Day 2. The first 10-second burn, dubbed NC-2, was performed using the right-hand OMS engine, changing the shuttle's speed by 8 ft/s (2.4 m/s). The burn raised both the apogee and perigee of the shuttle's orbit by 1-mile (1.6 km). Atlantis' reaction control jets were again fired for a second time to execute the 8-second NC-3 burn, which changed the shuttle's velocity by about 2 ft/s (0.61 m/s).

Meanwhile, Mission Control managers determined that the ISS would not need an avoidance maneuver to avoid a piece of orbital debris. Updated tracking information showed that the ISS and the debris would not pass close enough the following day to require any action.

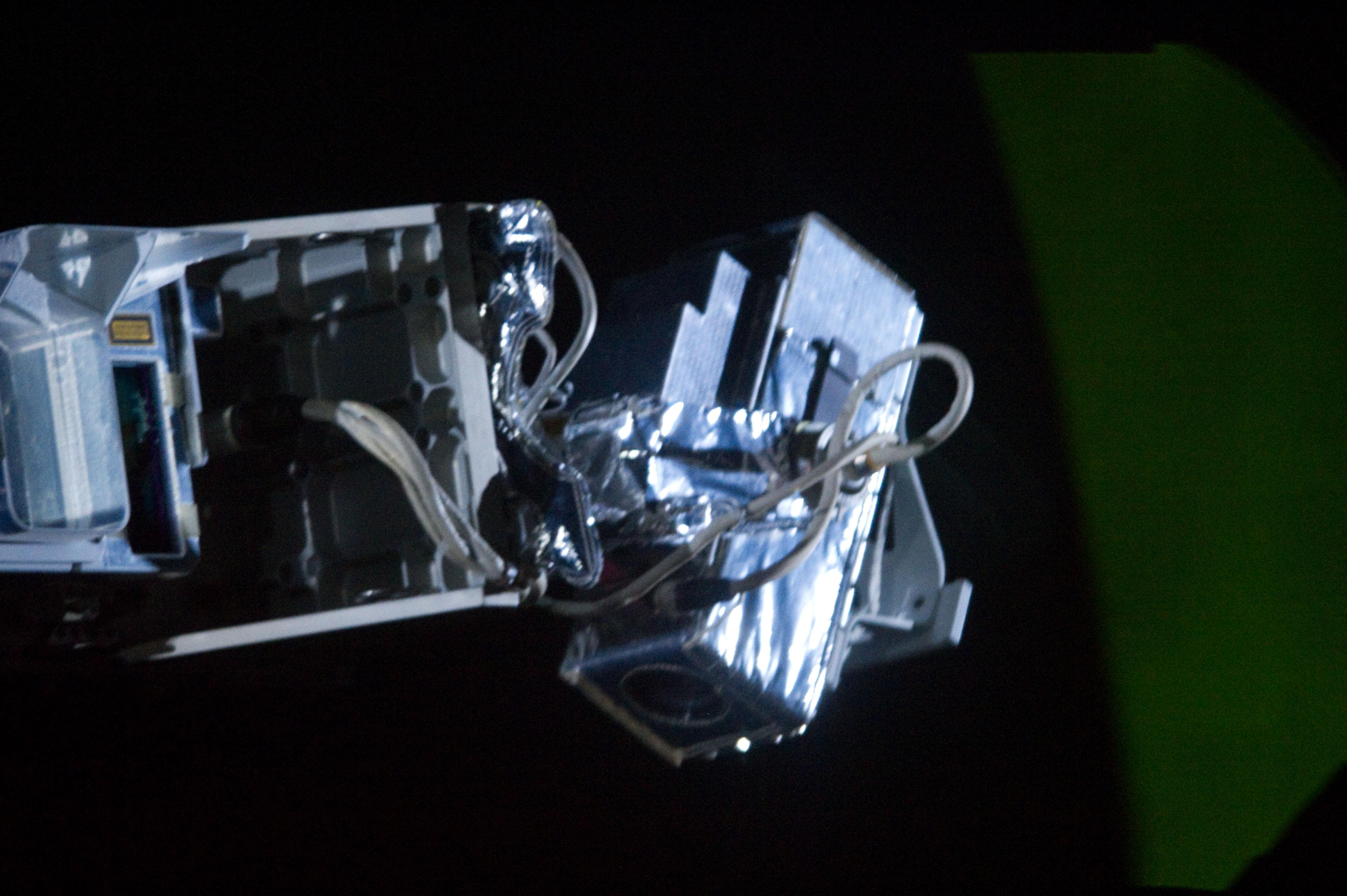
Snagged cable in the sensor package pan and tilt unit

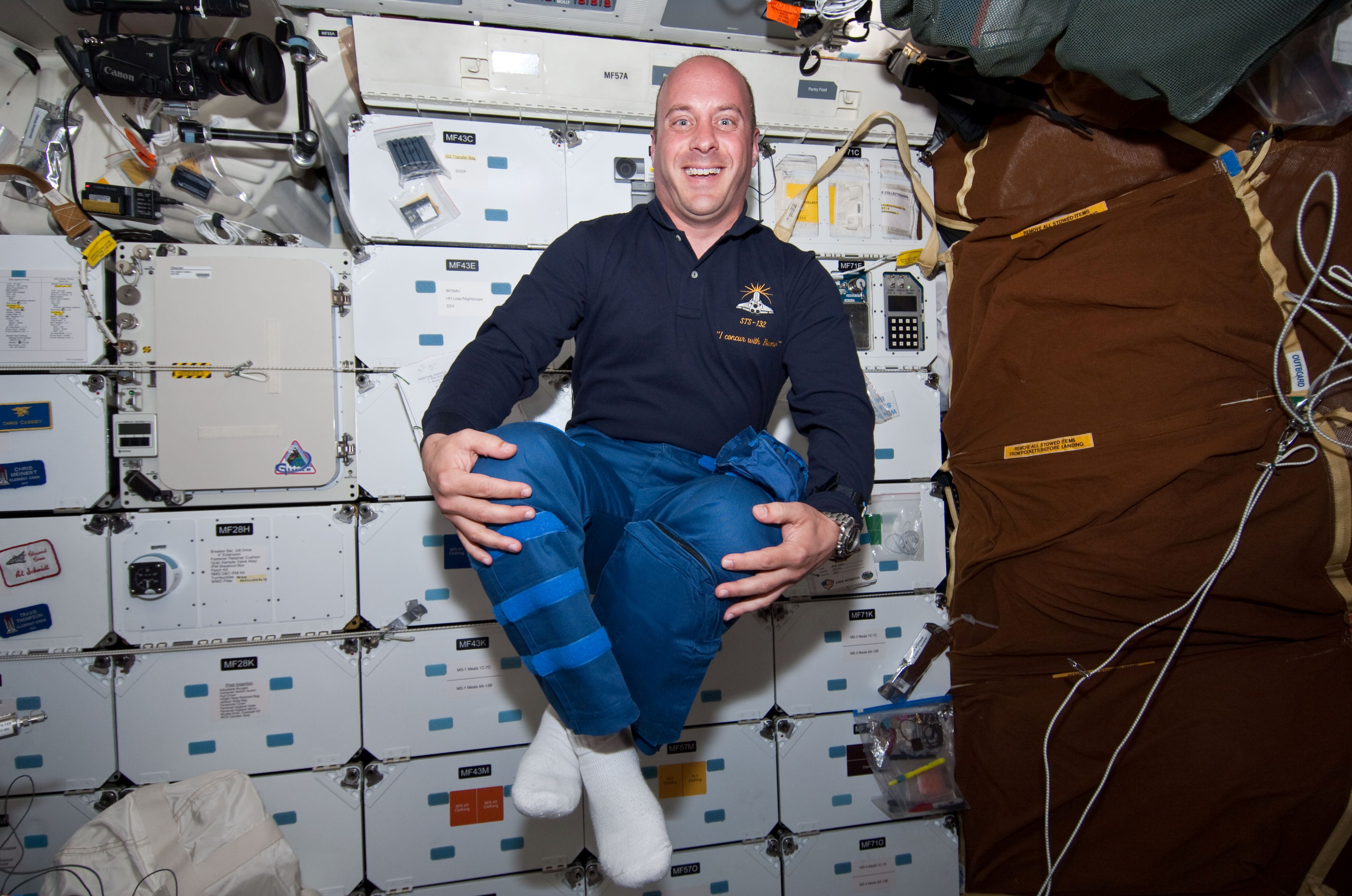
Garrett "Big G" Reisman in the middeck of Atlantis

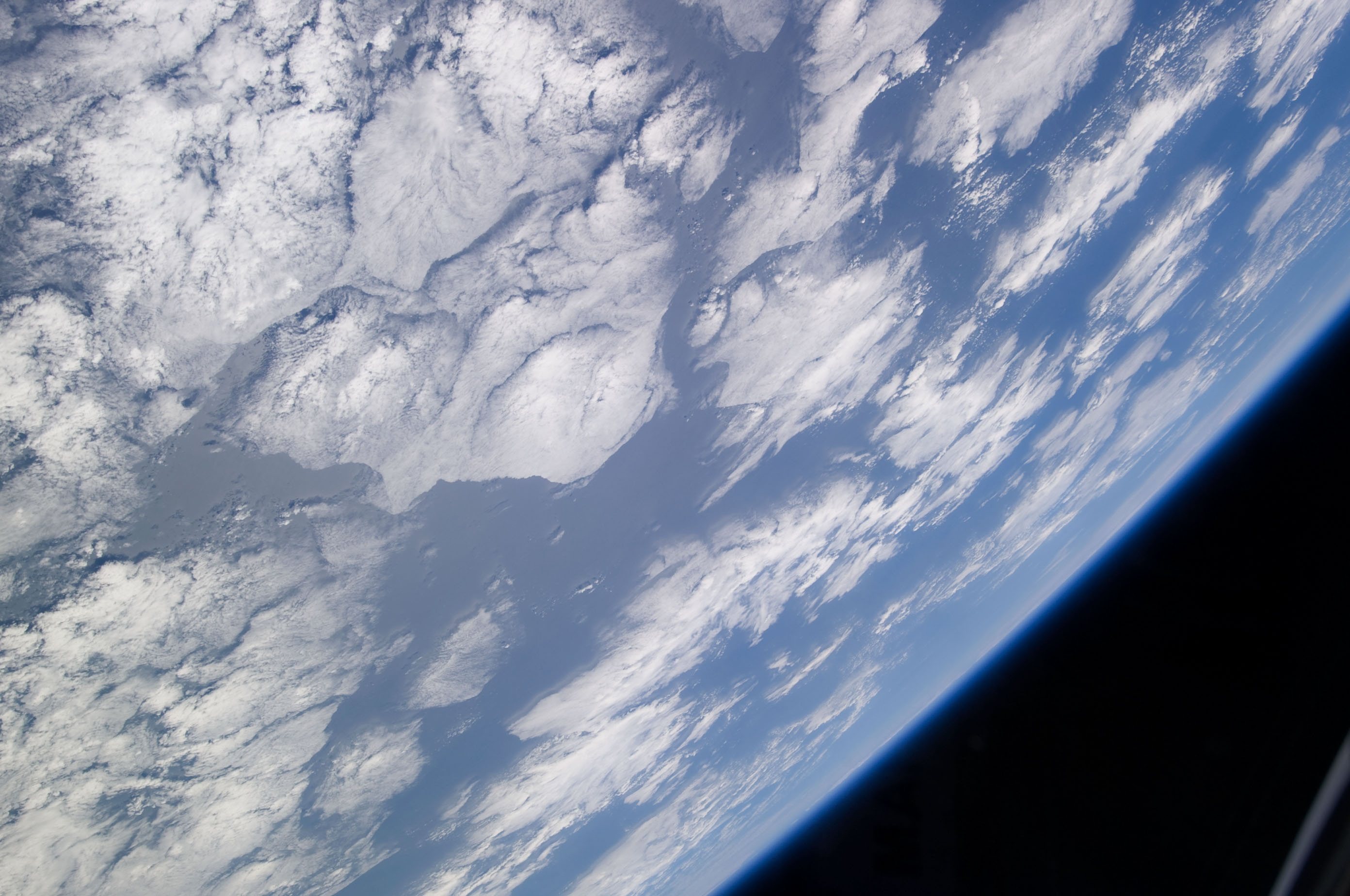
Blue and White part of Earth as photographed by a crew member

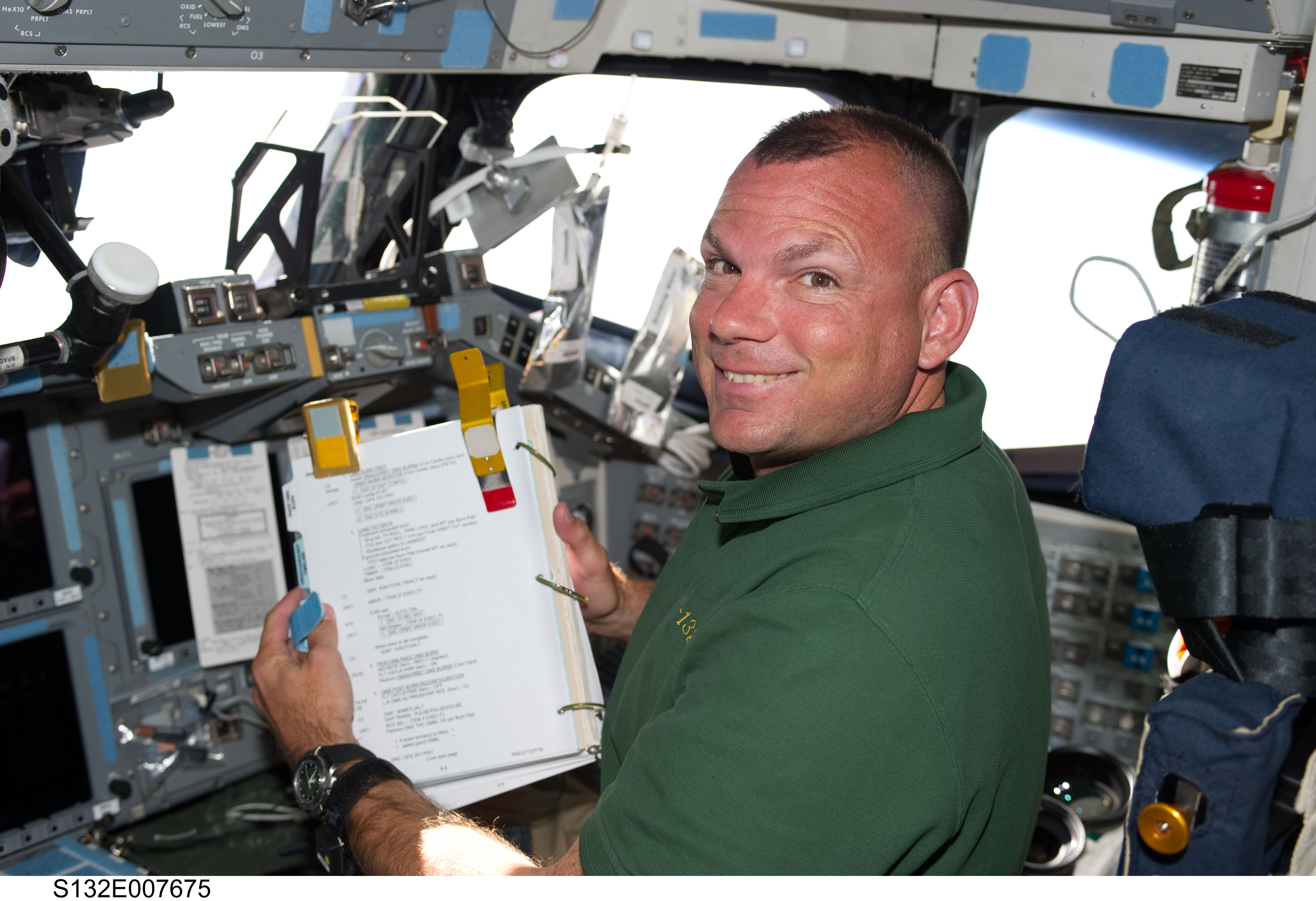
Tony Antonelli

=== May 16 (Flight Day 3 – Docking) ===
The STS-132 crew began their day at 07:20 UTC and prepared to dock with the ISS. Commander Ken Ham performed a series of rendezvous burns (NH, NC4 and TI) to boost the orbit of Atlantis to match with that of the ISS. The longest of these, the 1-minute-24-second-long orbit raising maneuver or NH burn, changed Atlantis' velocity by 132 feet per second, and placed the shuttle into a new 212-by-145 miles (233 km) orbit. A 63-second circularization burn, known as NC4, boosted Atlantis into a 214-by-210-mile (340 km) orbit. At 11:40 UTC, with about 9 miles (14 km) separating the shuttle and the ISS, commander Ken Ham performed the final 12-second terminal initiation (TI) burn, firing the left OMS engine of Atlantis.

By 13:26 UTC, with Ken Ham flying the shuttle from the aft flight deck, Atlantis positioned itself beneath the ISS and began the 360-degree flip rendezvous pitch maneuver (RPM). As the shuttle's underside rotated into view, three ISS crew members – Oleg Kotov using a camera with a 400mm lens, and Timothy Creamer and Soichi Noguchi using two 800mm-lens cameras – took 398 photographs of Atlantis' belly, as part of post-launch inspections of the thermal protection system.

Atlantis docked with the ISS Pressurized Mating Adapter-2 at 14:28 UTC as the two orbited 220 miles (350 km) over the South Pacific Ocean. After docking, the ISS was reoriented by the small vernier thrusters on Atlantis to minimize the risk of Micro-Meteoroid Orbital Debris (MMOD) impacts upon the shuttle. A series of leak checks were done on both sides of the hatch by the shuttle and station crews, before the hatches were opened at 16:18 UTC. After a brief welcoming ceremony by the station crew, Atlantis' astronauts received the standard station safety briefing. The crew then got to work with initial transfers of equipment and supplies. Spacesuits were among the first items to go to the ISS. Station crew member Noguchi also transferred high-priority JAXA experiments to the Kibo module.

Sellers and Expedition 23/24 astronaut Tracy Caldwell Dyson got to work on their joint task to relocate the ICC-VLD cargo pallet. The duo used the station's robotic arm to transfer the pallet from Atlantis to the station's mobile base system to prepare for the spacewalks.

In preparation for the following day's spacewalk, all Atlantis' crew members gathered for an hour-long spacewalk procedure review. Mission Specialists Reisman and Bowen spent the night in the Quest airlock as part of the overnight campout procedure to help them get prepared for the spacewalk. The crewlock was depressurized from 14.7 to 10.2 psi. The depressurization was required to avoid the formation of nitrogen bubbles in the astronauts' blood, which could result in decompression sickness.

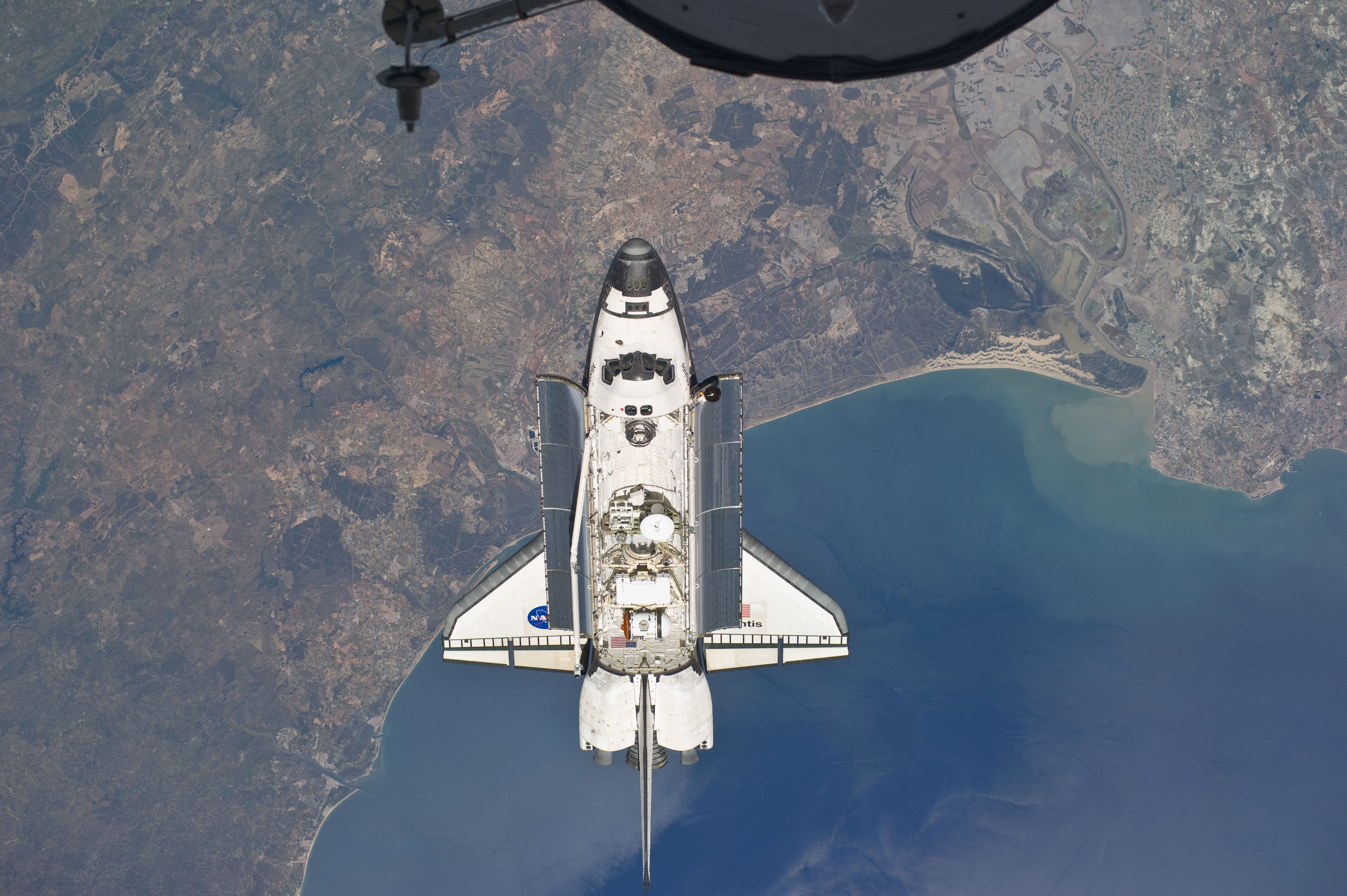
Flying above the Atlantic coast of Spain and the Gulf of Cadiz, Atlantis approaches the ISS for docking.

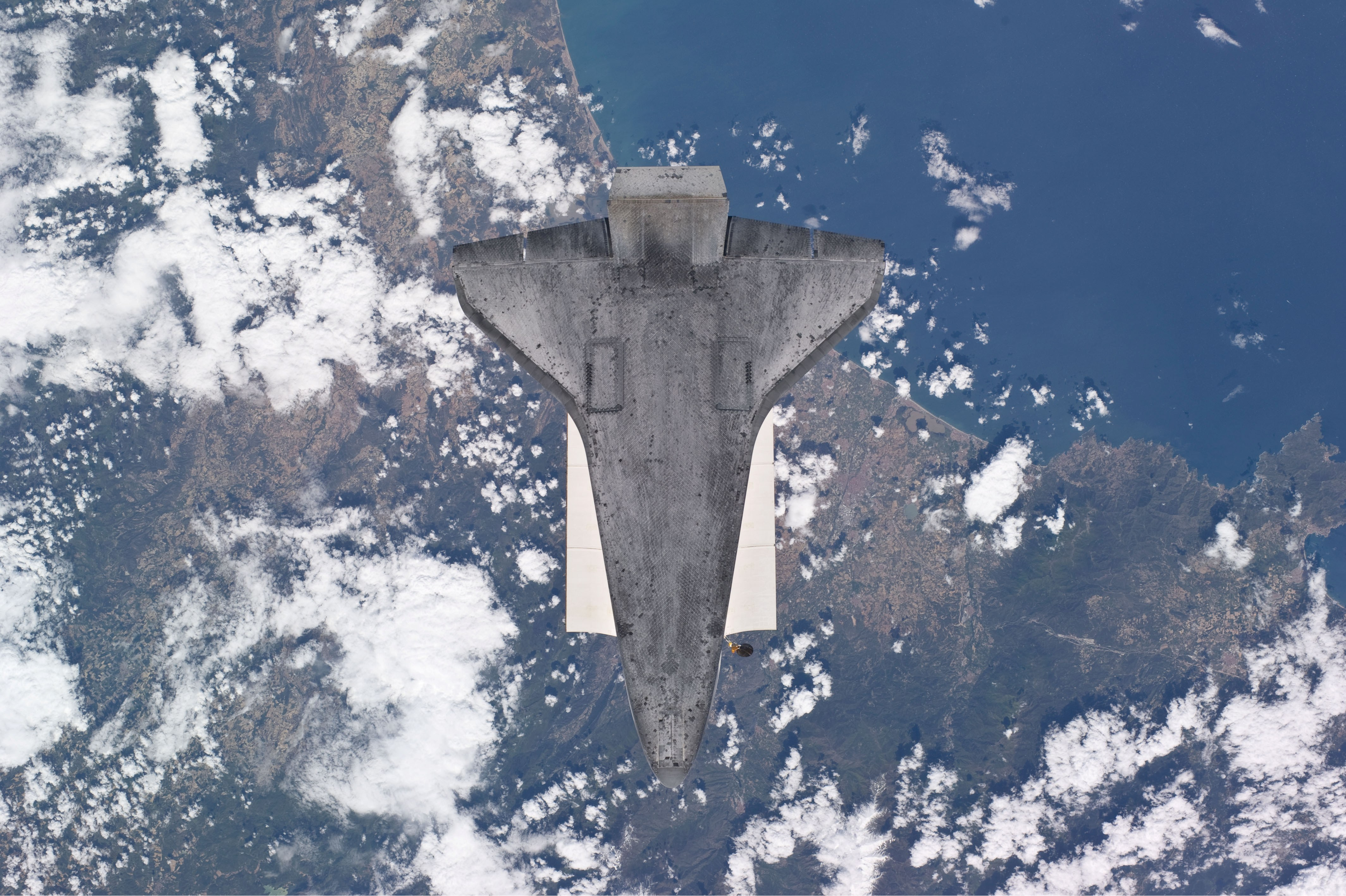
Underside of Atlantis is revealed during the RPM.

Atlantis docks with the space station (4 mins 30 secs).

Flight Day 3 highlights (26 mins 1 sec)

=== May 17 (Flight Day 4 – EVA 1) ===
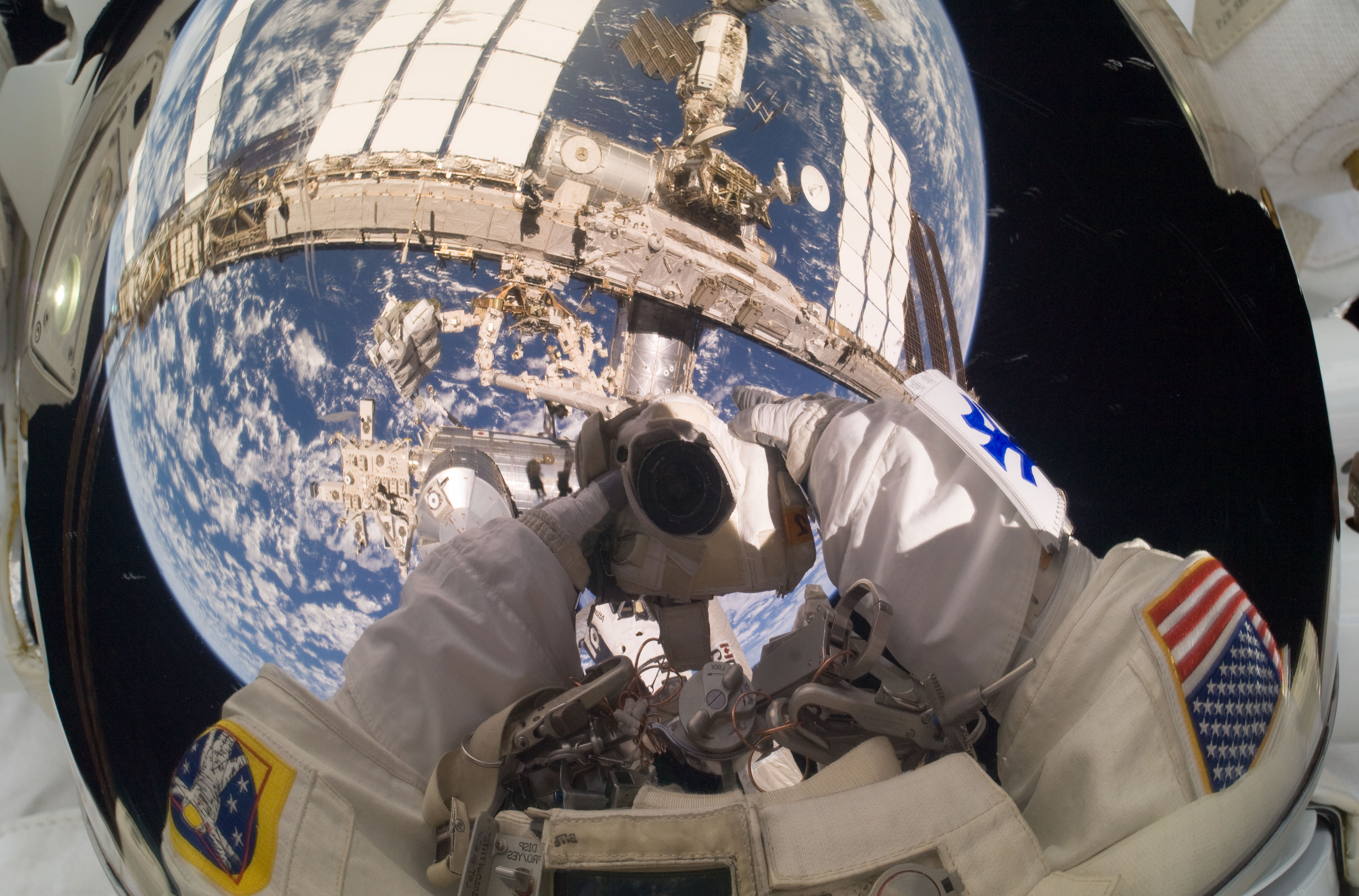
Reisman takes a self portrait during EVA 1.

After the morning wakeup call, Mission Control CAPCOM Shannon Lucid informed the shuttle crew that no detailed flight inspection would be required on the next day. However, the crew were requested to utilize that time to do inspections on various sections of Atlantis that were not inspected on flight day 2.

Flight day 4 saw Mission Specialists Garret Reisman and Steve Bowen perform the first of three planned spacewalks. The pair installed a spare Space To Ground Antenna (SGANT), a new enhanced tool platform for the Special Purpose Dexterous Manipulator (SPDM, also known as Dextre) and released torque on the six new batteries for the Port 6 (P6) truss segment.

Expedition 23 Flight Engineer Creamer helped the duo with their suit-up preparations. Mike Good joined STS-132 Pilot Antonelli, the intravehicular officer, to assist during the spacewalk. Mission Specialist Sellers and station Flight Engineer Caldwell Dyson operated the robotic arm. Throughout EVA 1, Commander Ken Ham oversaw the extravehicular activities.

During the spacewalk, several problems were encountered, the first of which was during installation of the SGANT. A slight gap was observed between the antenna dish and its mounting pole. The spacewalkers loosened the bolts and used a higher torque setting, which managed to close the gap to a smaller width. The launch locks were left on the SGANT to allow engineers on the ground to determine if the gap was acceptable, or if more troubleshooting would be needed. The second problem occurred during the installation of the SGANT, and was related to the Command and Control (CNC) computers. During installation, when Steve Bowen removed a cover from a connector, the prime CNC computer detected an error and shut down. The cap was a special cap which allowed the circuit for that connector to be closed, so when it was opened the sensor detected an error. The shut down of the CNC caused a 2-minute loss of communications. The safeing of the computer also stopped the Canadarm2 for a reconfiguration of the cameras being used during the spacewalk by both the robotic arm operators and observers on the ground.

The spacewalk ended at 19:19 UTC, after Reisman and Bowen made an inventory of the tools they brought with them and made their way back into the Quest airlock. STS-132's EVA 1 was the 237th conducted by U.S. astronauts, the second for Reisman and the fourth for Bowen. It was also the 144th in support of ISS assembly and maintenance. For EVA 1, lead spacewalker Reisman had a spacesuit with no stripes. Bowen' spacesuit was marked with a red stripe.

The shuttle's robotic arm also successfully grappled the MRM-1 module in Atlantis' cargo bay in preparation for its berthing to the Zarya service module the following day.

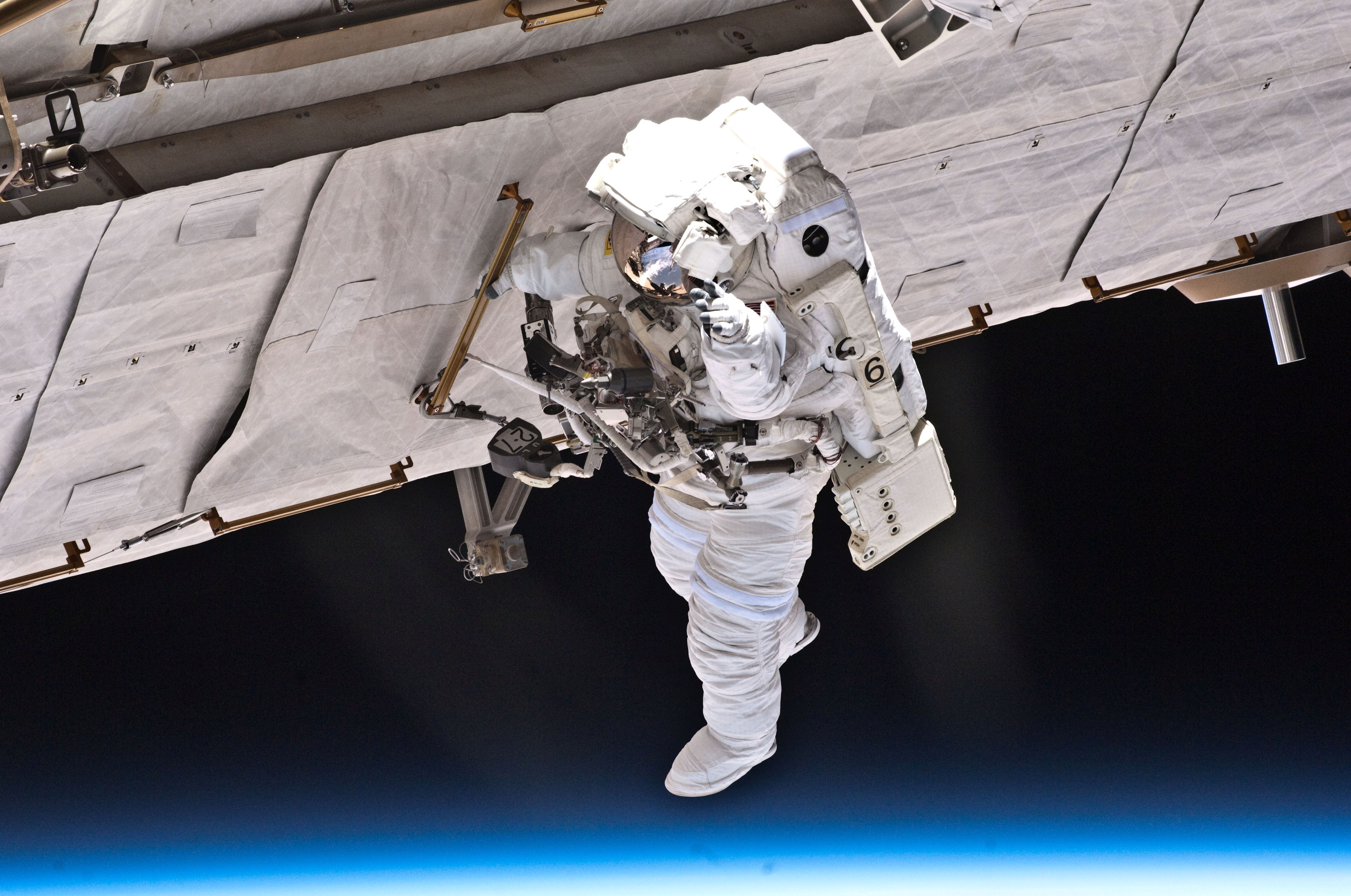
Reisman during EVA 1.

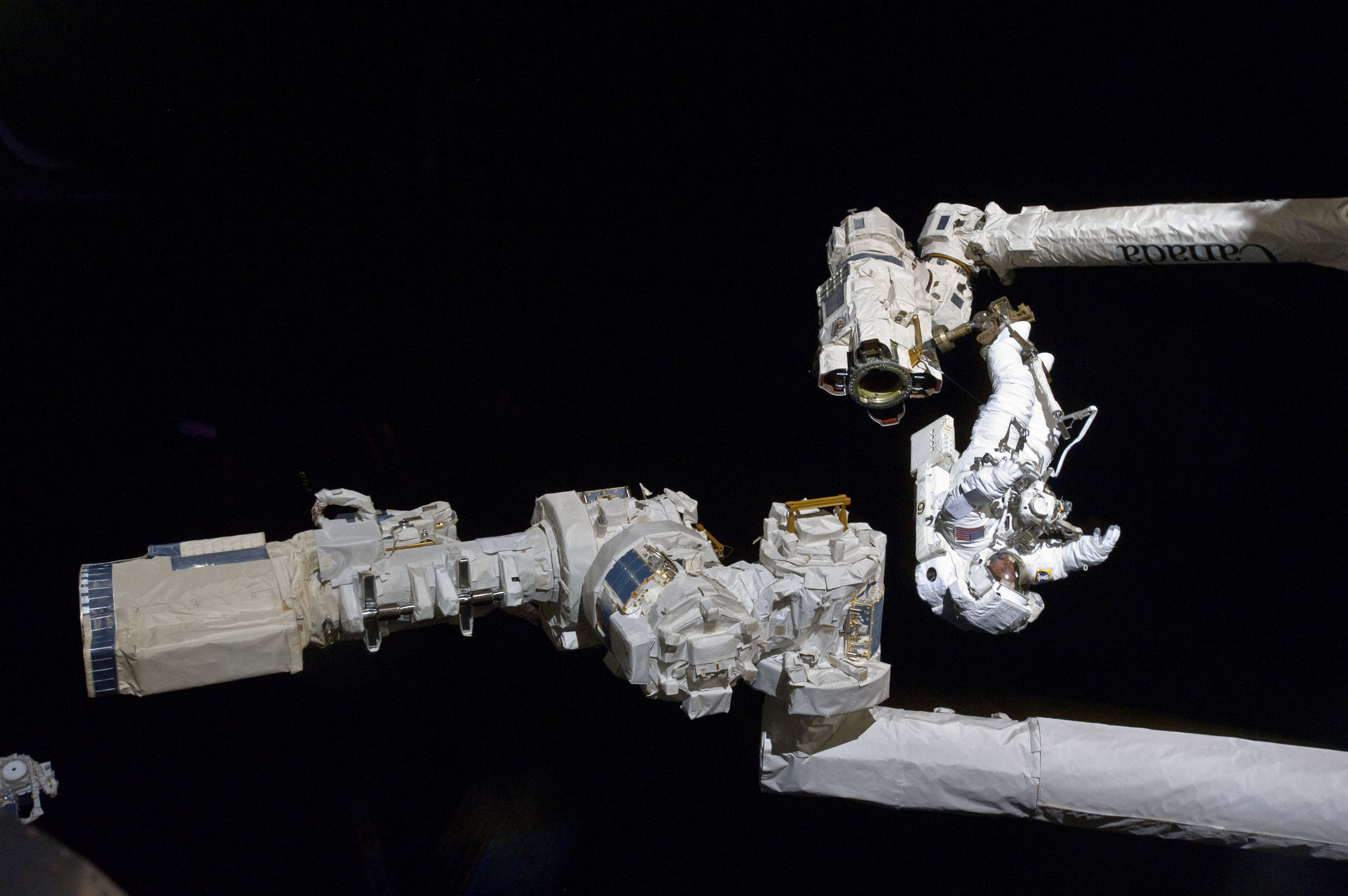
Garrett Reisman anchored to a Canadarm2 mobile foot restraint during EVA 1.

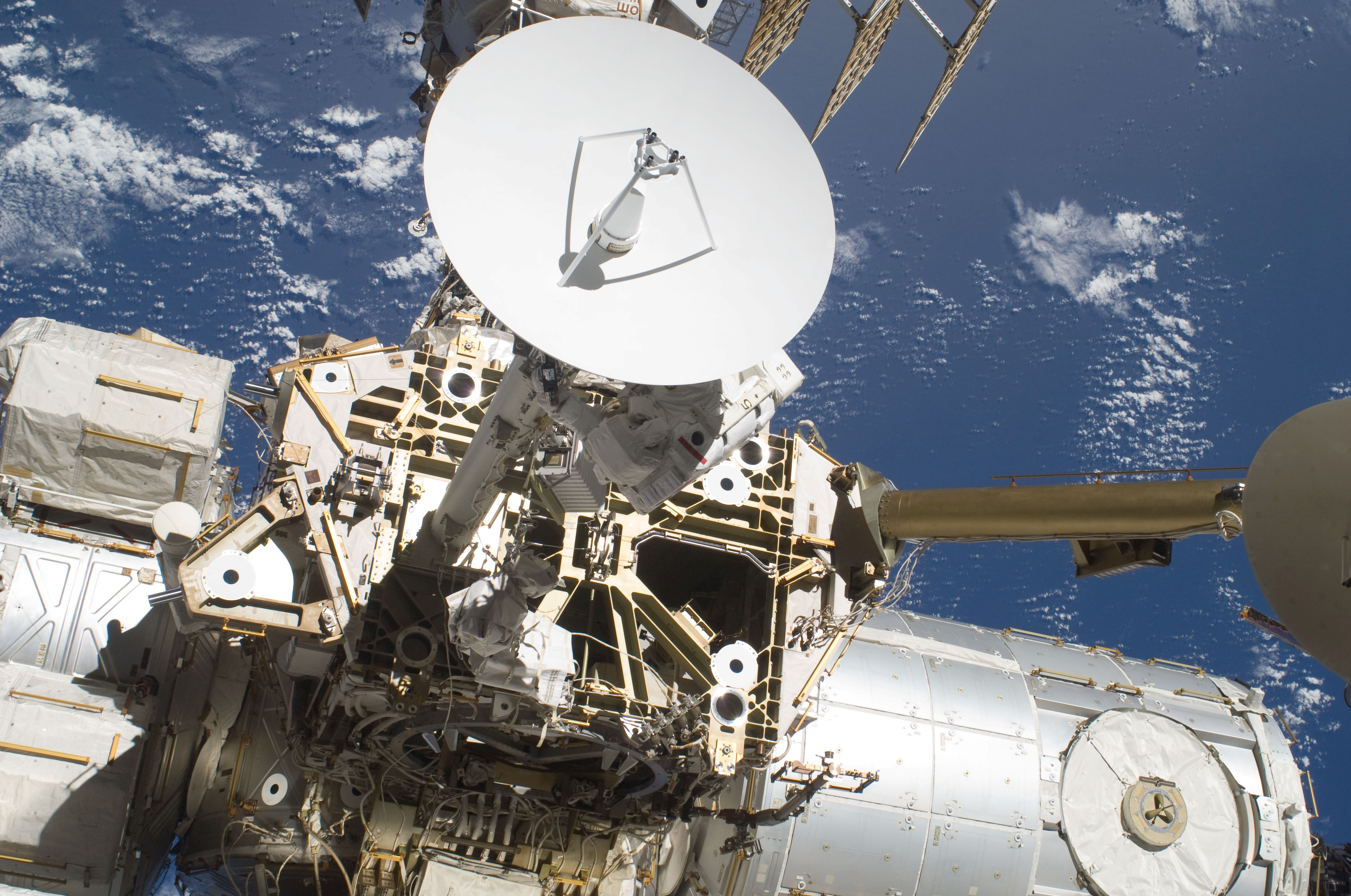
Stephen Bowen works on the installation of the K_{u} band antenna system.

=== May 18 (Flight Day 5 – MRM1 installation) ===
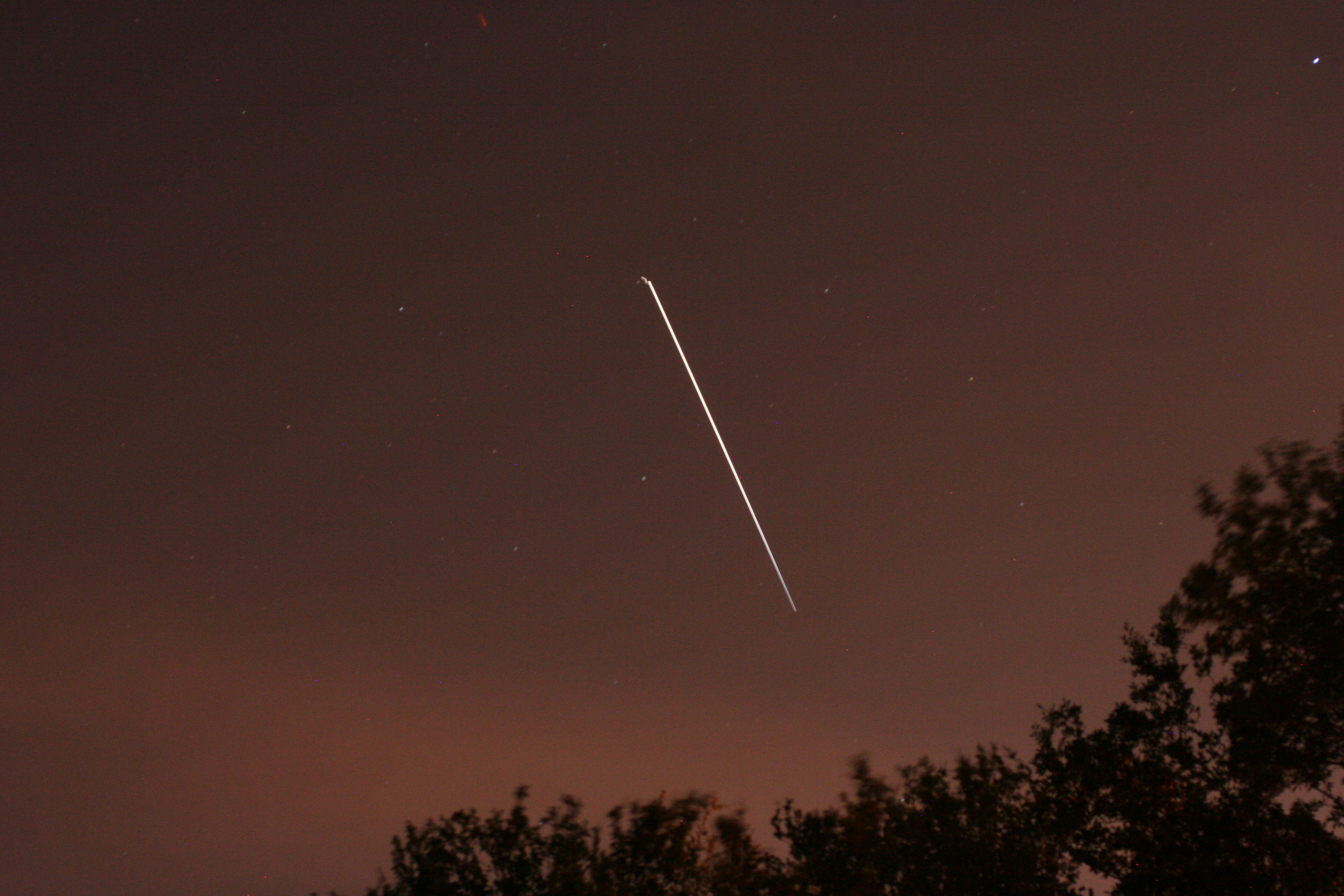
Atlantis docked with the ISS moving southeast across the skies of Tampa, Florida

On flight day 5, the crew focused on the addition of the MRM-1 module to the space station. Commander Ken Ham and pilot Tony Antonelli maneuvered Atlantis' robotic arm to unberth MRM-1 from the shuttle's payload bay at 09:49 UTC, and handed it off to the station's Canadarm2 at 10:14 UTC. Mission Specialists Garrett Reisman and Piers Sellers, working from inside the station's Cupola, then maneuvered the Canadarm2 arm to deliver MRM-1 to its new position, the Earth-facing port of the Zarya service module. The docking occurred at 12:20 UTC when the shuttle-station stack was flying above Argentina. Following the successful docking, Sellers reported to Mission Control that, during the docking, he did not see the expected "capture 1" confirmation signal appear on his laptop, to which CAPCOM Steve Swanson replied "And station, that error's expected. The reason you didn't get 'contact 1' is because Garrett did too good of a job flying. He went right down the middle and got a hole in one."

Expedition 23 Commander Oleg Kotov also monitored the activities from the Russian segment, as the MRM-1 began its automated docking sequence for the final attachment to the Zarya module. The berthing marked the first time that the Russian automated docking system has been used along with the station's robotic arm.

At 17:20 UTC, shuttle crew members Ham, Reisman, Sellers, along with station crew members Kotov, Skvortsov and Caldwell Dyson, gathered in the space station's Harmony module to talk with reporters from MSNBC, Fox News and CNN. The two crews answered questions related to their stay in orbit, medical experiments being conducted on the ISS, spacewalking experiences and the Gulf of Mexico oil spill.

After midday, Reisman and Sellers used Canadarm2 to unberth the OBSS from the sill of Atlantis' cargo bay and handed it off to the shuttle's robotic arm, operated by Ham and Antonelli.

Mission Specialists Bowen and Good prepared for next day's EVA 2, configuring their tools and preparing their spacesuits. At the end of the workday, Atlantis' crew, along with three station crew members, met for an hour-long spacewalk procedure review.

At 21:45 UTC, Good and Bowen began their campout inside the Quest airlock, with pressure reduced to 10.2 psi to reduce the risk of decompression sickness.

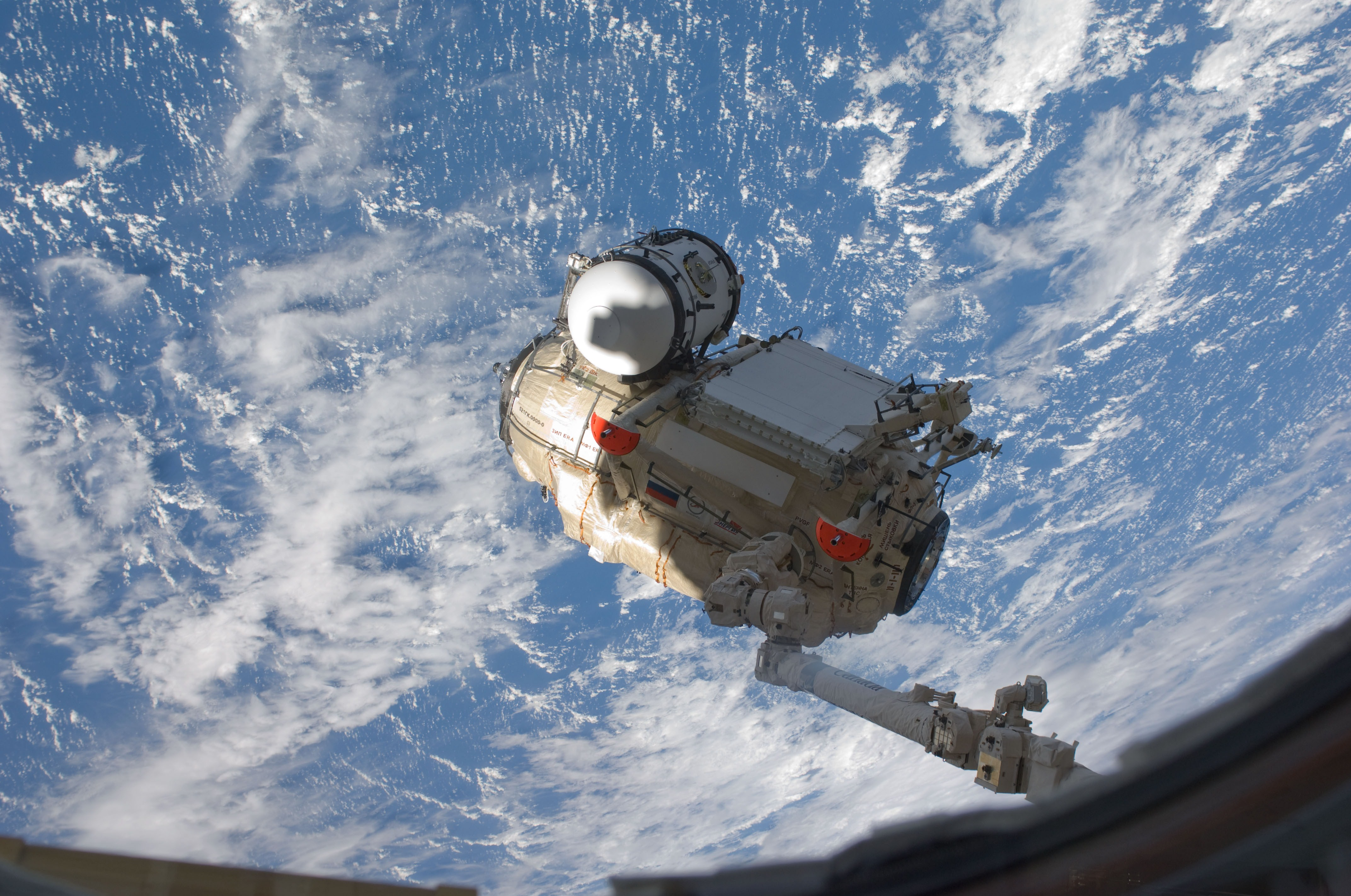
Canadarm2 transfers MRM-1 to the Earth-facing port of the Zarya module.

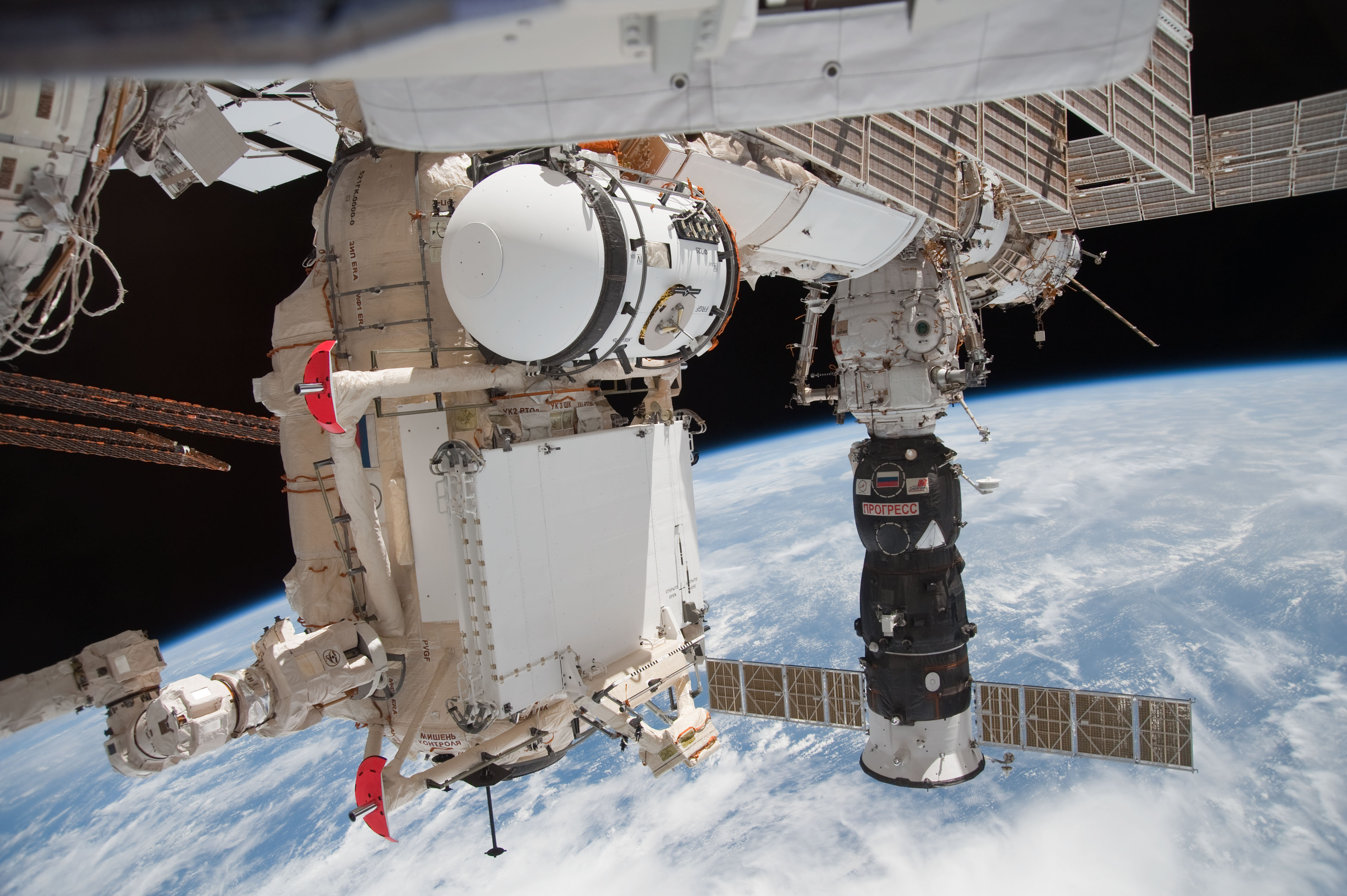
Canadarm2 attaches MRM-1 to the Zarya module.

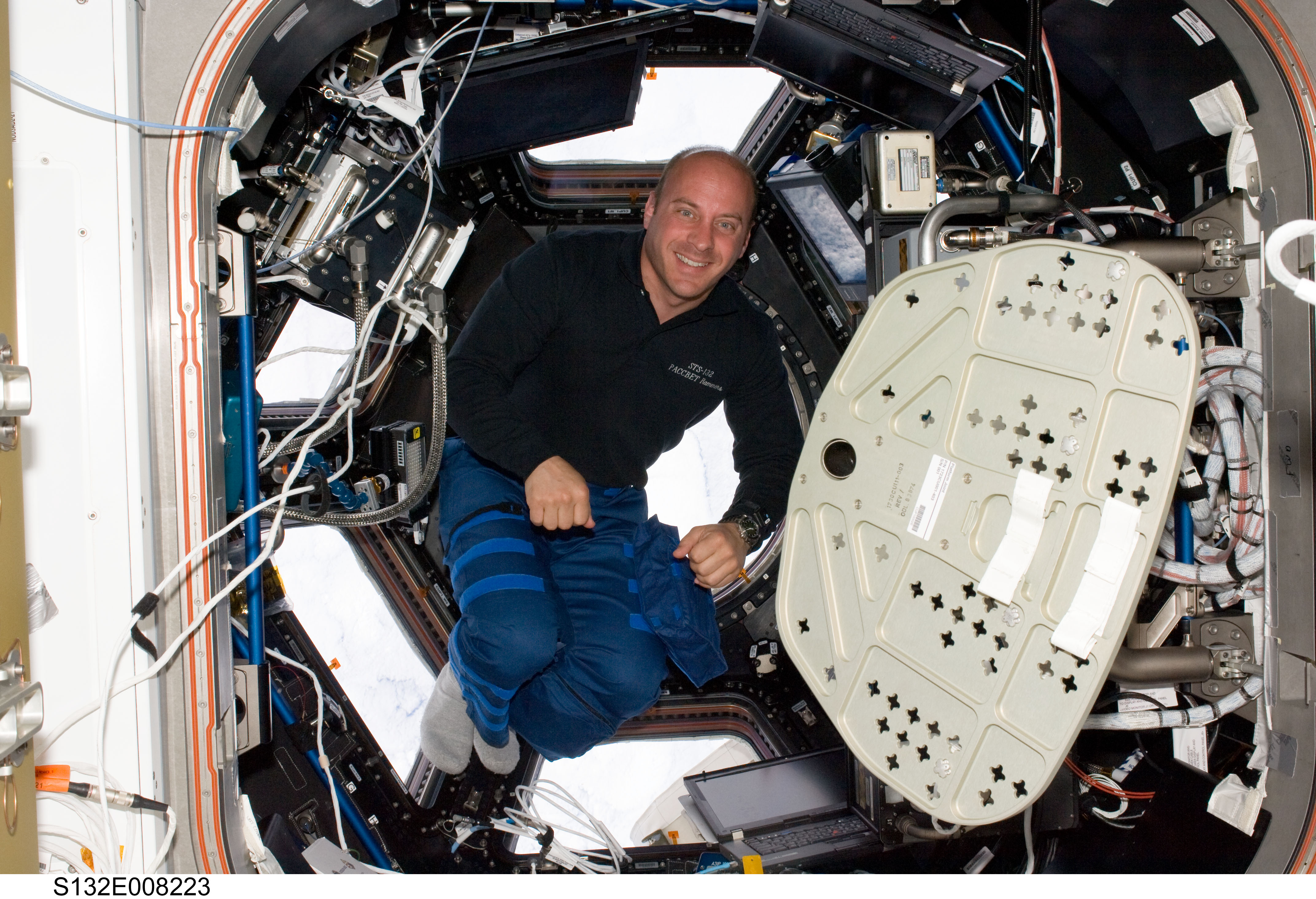
Garrett Reisman inside the Cupola.

=== May 19 (Flight Day 6 – EVA 2) ===
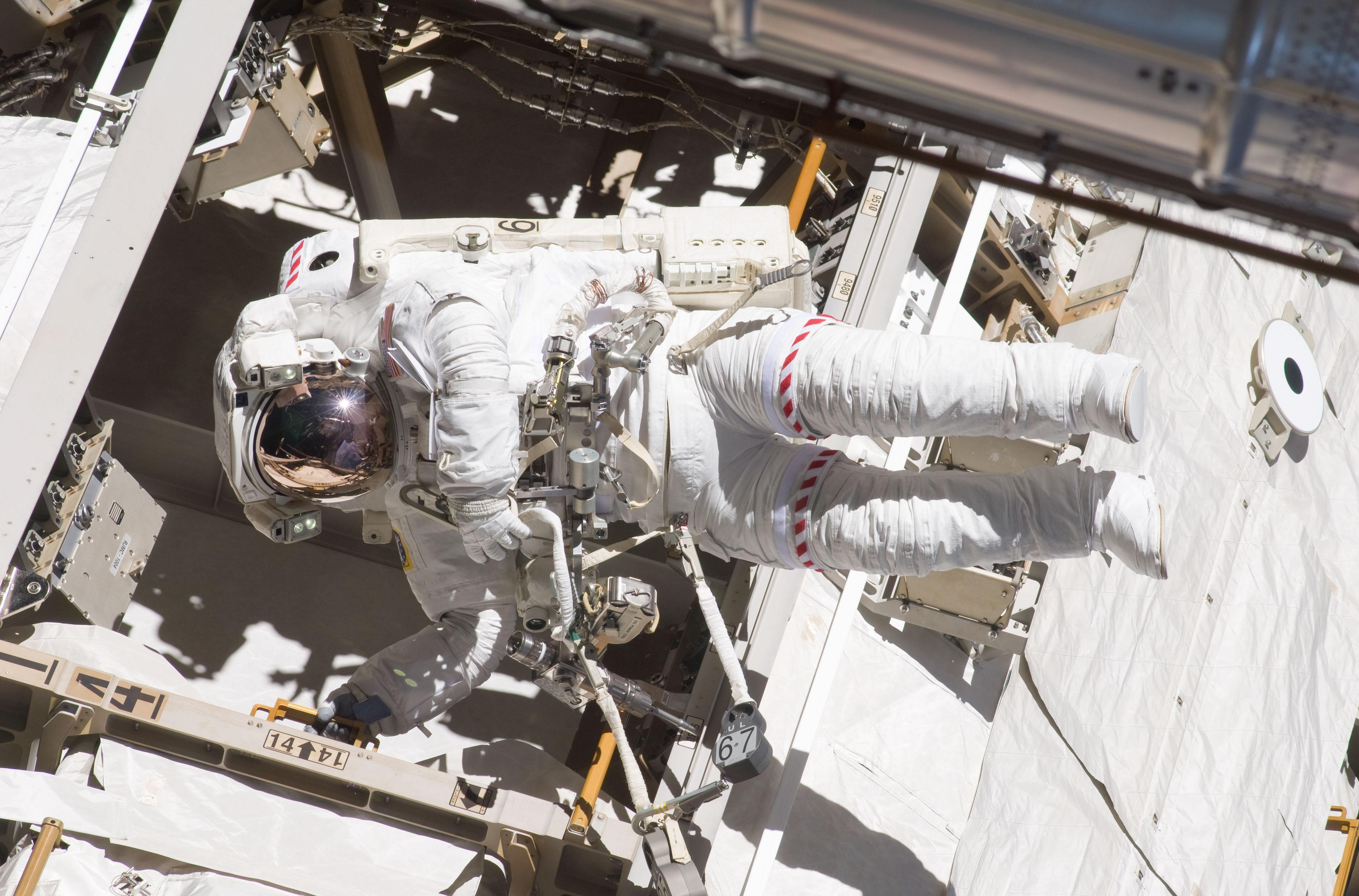
Mike Good during EVA 2

The primary task on the mission's second spacewalk, EVA 2, was to remove and replace batteries on the station's port 6 truss. The spacewalk got under way at 10:38 UTC, more than 25 minutes ahead of the scheduled start, which already had been moved up 30 minutes.

Lead spacewalker Bowen's first task was to remove a cable snag in the OBSS's pan and tilt mechanism. Bowen looped a tie wrap on two cables to relieve the snag and completed the task in less than 30 minutes, while Good began work with the batteries. Although the initial plan was to replace three batteries, the two astronauts managed to replace an additional fourth battery during EVA 2. The batteries Bowen and Good replaced had originally been launched in November 2000. After the battery work and cleanup of the area, Bowen and Good moved on to the new backup K_{u} band antenna on the Z1 truss. They tightened bolts holding the antenna's dish to its boom, closing a gap left there after EVA 1. Good performed a wiggle test and confirmed that two spacewalkers did not see any signs of motion in the antenna-mast interface. They then removed the antenna's launch locks, leaving the antenna ready to operate.

During EVA 2, commander Ken Ham provided photo and television support, and pilot Tony Antonelli served as the spacewalk choreographer. ISS crew member Tracy Caldwell Dyson also assisted with spacewalk preparations. EVA 2 marked the 238th conducted by U.S. astronauts, the fifth for Bowen and the third for Good. It was also the 145th in support of International Space Station assembly and maintenance.

=== May 20 (Flight Day 7 – MRM-1 initial checks, transfers and off-duty) ===
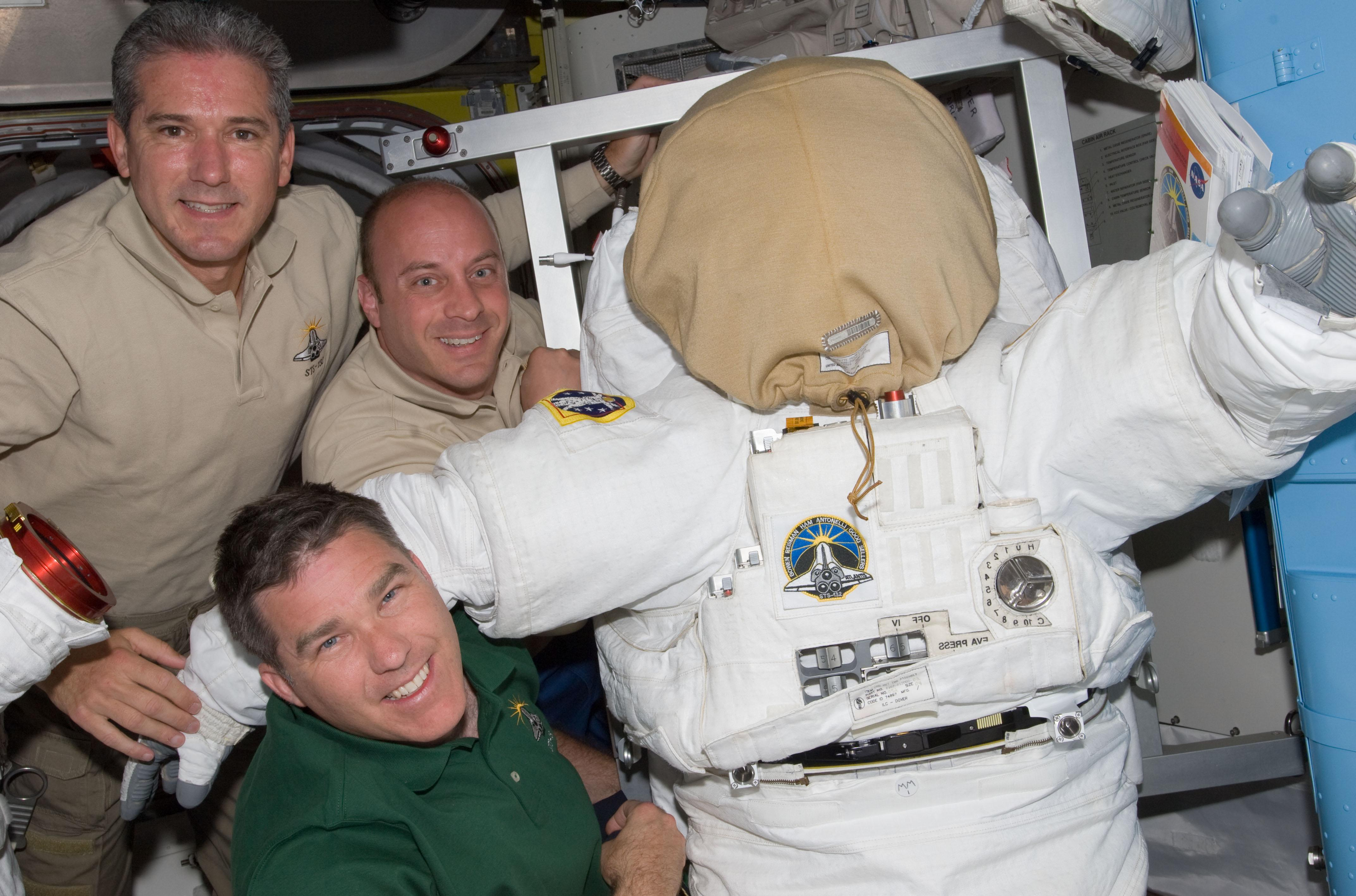
Good, Bowen and Reisman pose for a photo with an Extravehicular Mobility Unit (EMU).

On flight day 7, the crew spent a few hours of off-duty time in the afternoon, but otherwise were largely focused on preparations for EVA 3. Earlier in the day, at 10:52 UTC, following leak checks, ISS Expedition 23 commander Oleg Kotov and flight engineer Alexander Skvortsov opened the hatch to the MRM-1 module. They wore eye and breathing protection as a standard precaution when entering a new module. Kotov reported that some metal filings were drifting around inside the new module as unpacking activities gathered pace, although initially he reported the interior of MRM-1 looked clean. Flight controllers both in Houston and Moscow worked with the crew to develop a technique for safely removing the floating debris.

At 12:25 UTC, shuttle crew members Ken Ham, Tony Antonelli, Piers Sellers, and ISS flight engineer Tracy Caldwell Dyson, talked with the Associated Press, Fox News Radio, and CBS News. Ham also joined in with past and present members of Mission Control to recognize Lonnie J. Schmitt as the first flight controller to reach his 100th shuttle mission.

During the day, Ham, Antonelli and Sellers transferred equipment, supplies and experiments between Atlantis and the ISS. Mission Specialists Mike Good and Garrett Reisman prepared for EVA 3, configuring tools and preparing suits and the Quest airlock. Ham, Antonelli and Sellers also joined them to review the procedures. As part of the campout procedure, the two spacewalkers spent the night in the Quest airlock, with its air pressure reduced to 10.2 psi.

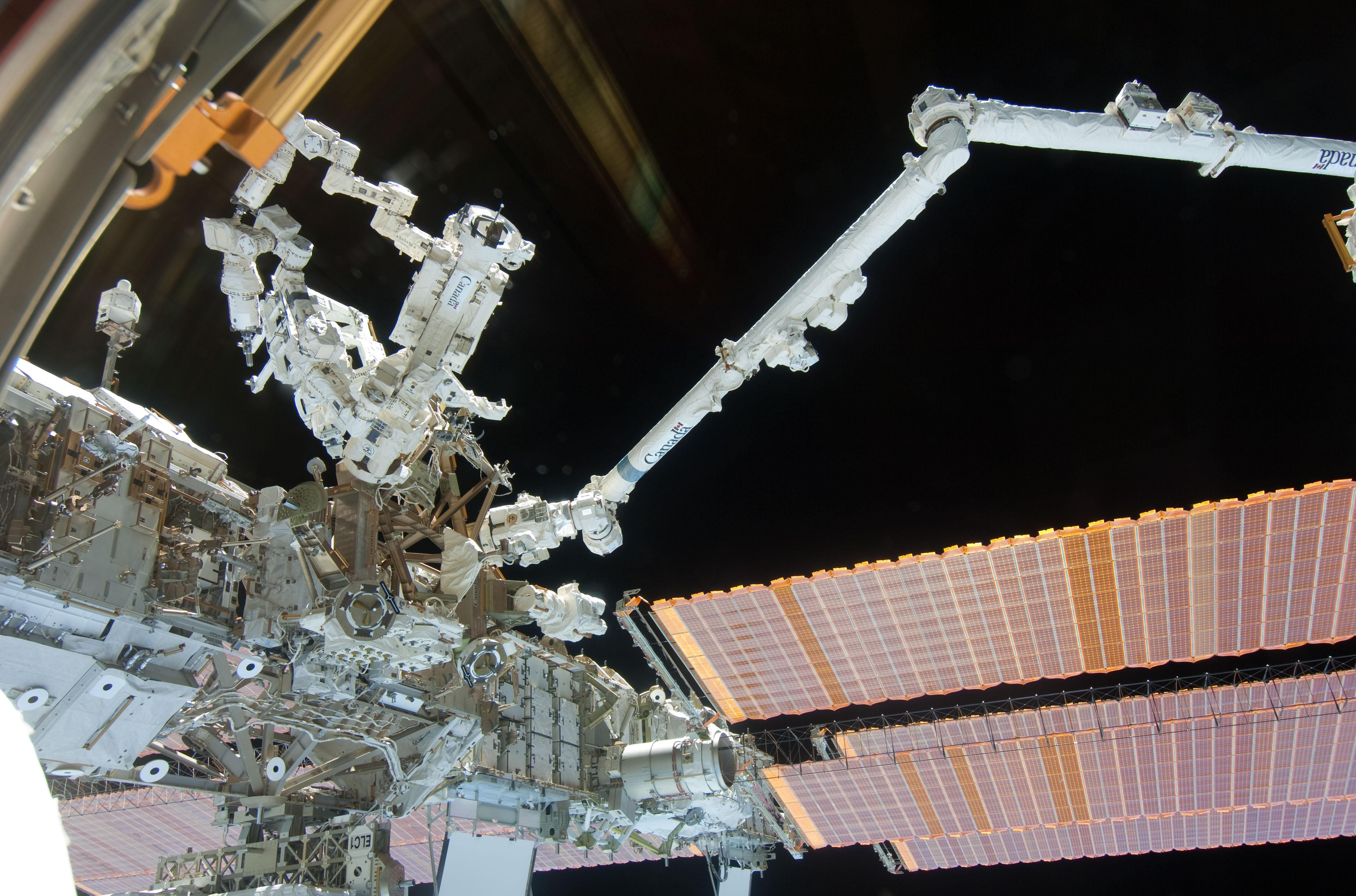
A section of ISS as photographed by a STS-132 crew member

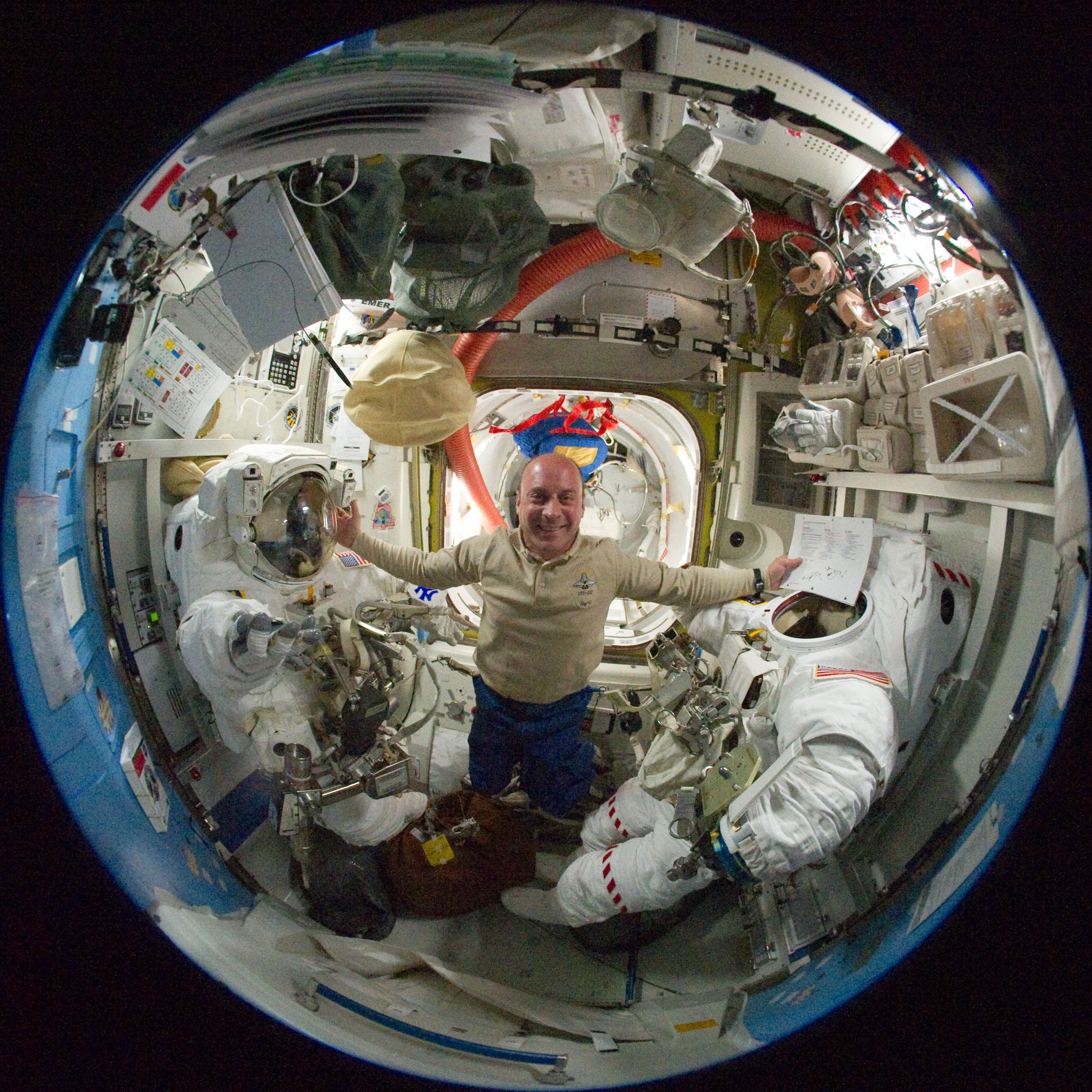
Garrett Reisman inside the Quest airlock

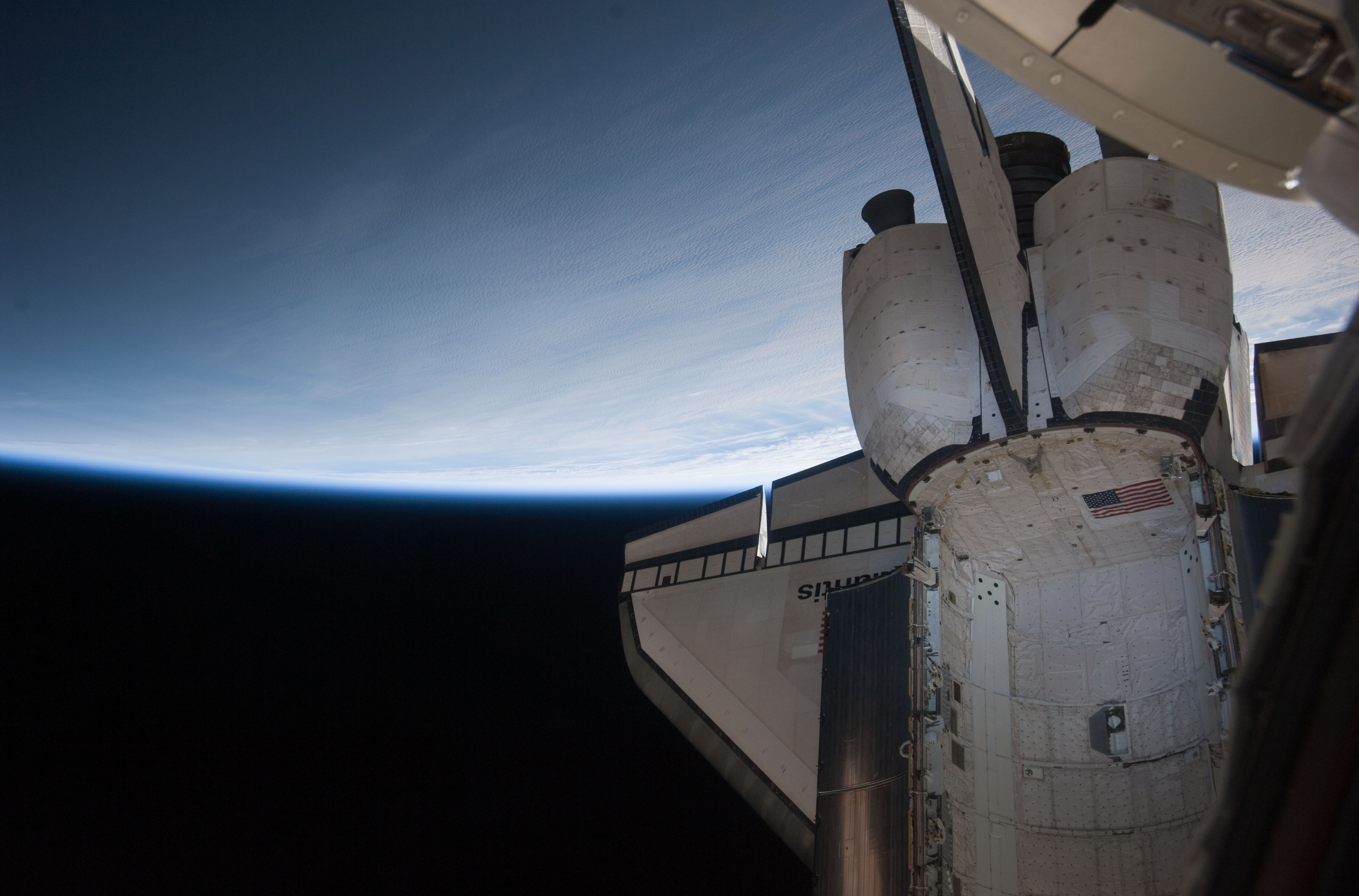
The aft section of Atlantis while docked with the Station

=== May 21 (Flight Day 8 – EVA 3) ===
On flight day 8, Mike Good and Garret Reisman completed EVA 3, the third and final spacewalk of the STS-132 mission. The pair connected a pair of ammonia jumpers on the P4/P5 truss segment, before continuing on out to the end of the P6 truss. Once at the P6 truss, Good and Reisman completed the battery swap by removing and replacing the final two batteries and retrieving the temporarily stowed old battery on the truss. Once that task was complete, Good and Reisman moved to Atlantis's payload bay, where they removed a grapple fixture and took it to the Quest airlock. The pair then moved on to fix some insulation on the Dextre robot, and stowed some tools in an external toolbox on the Z1 truss. Pilot Tony Antonelli choreographed the spacewalk from inside the shuttle.

While the spacewalk was going on, Commander Ken Ham and Mission Specialist Steve Bowen completed some more of the transfer work for the mission.

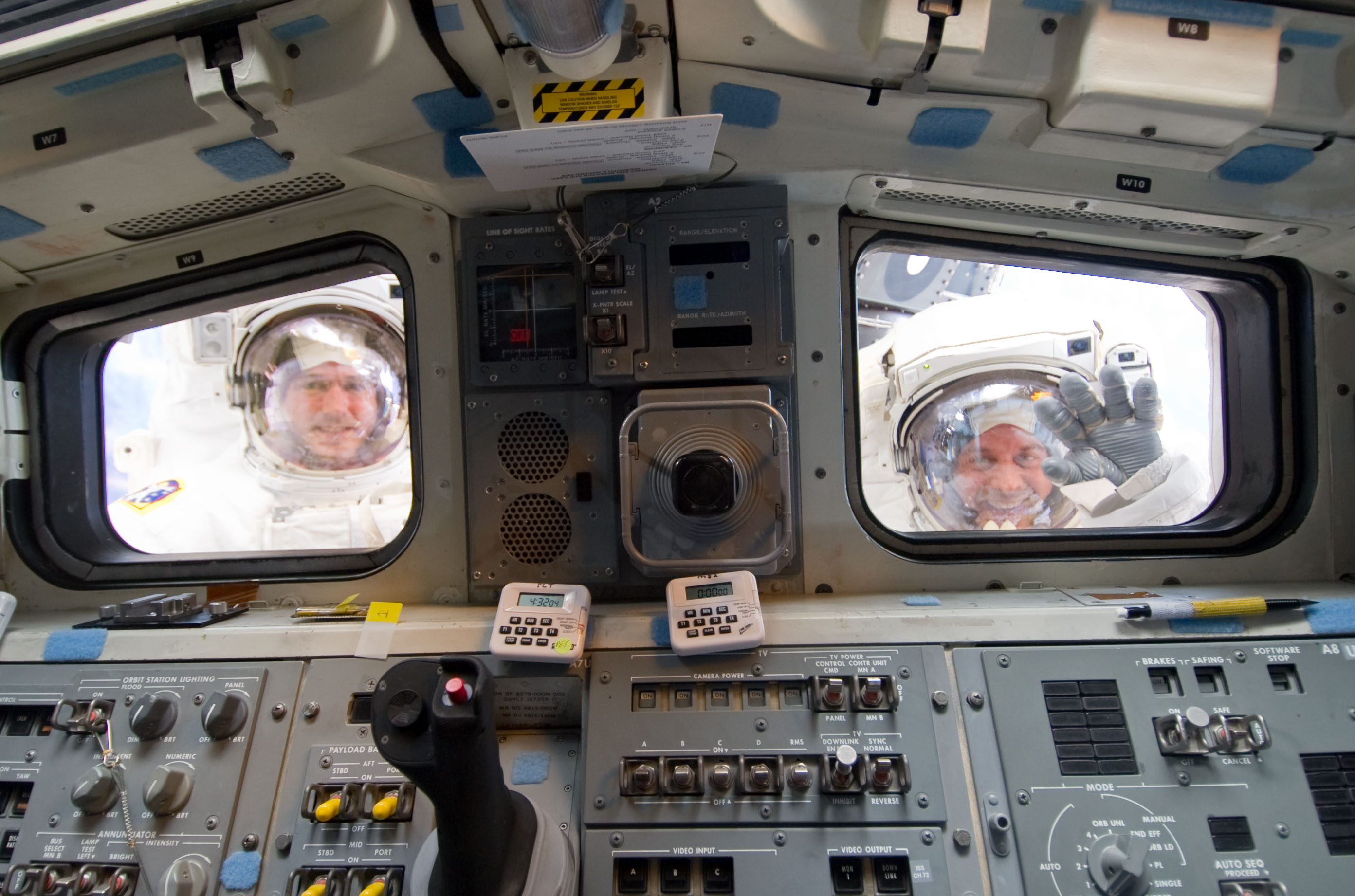
Good (left) and Reisman look through the aft flight deck windows of Atlantis during EVA 3.

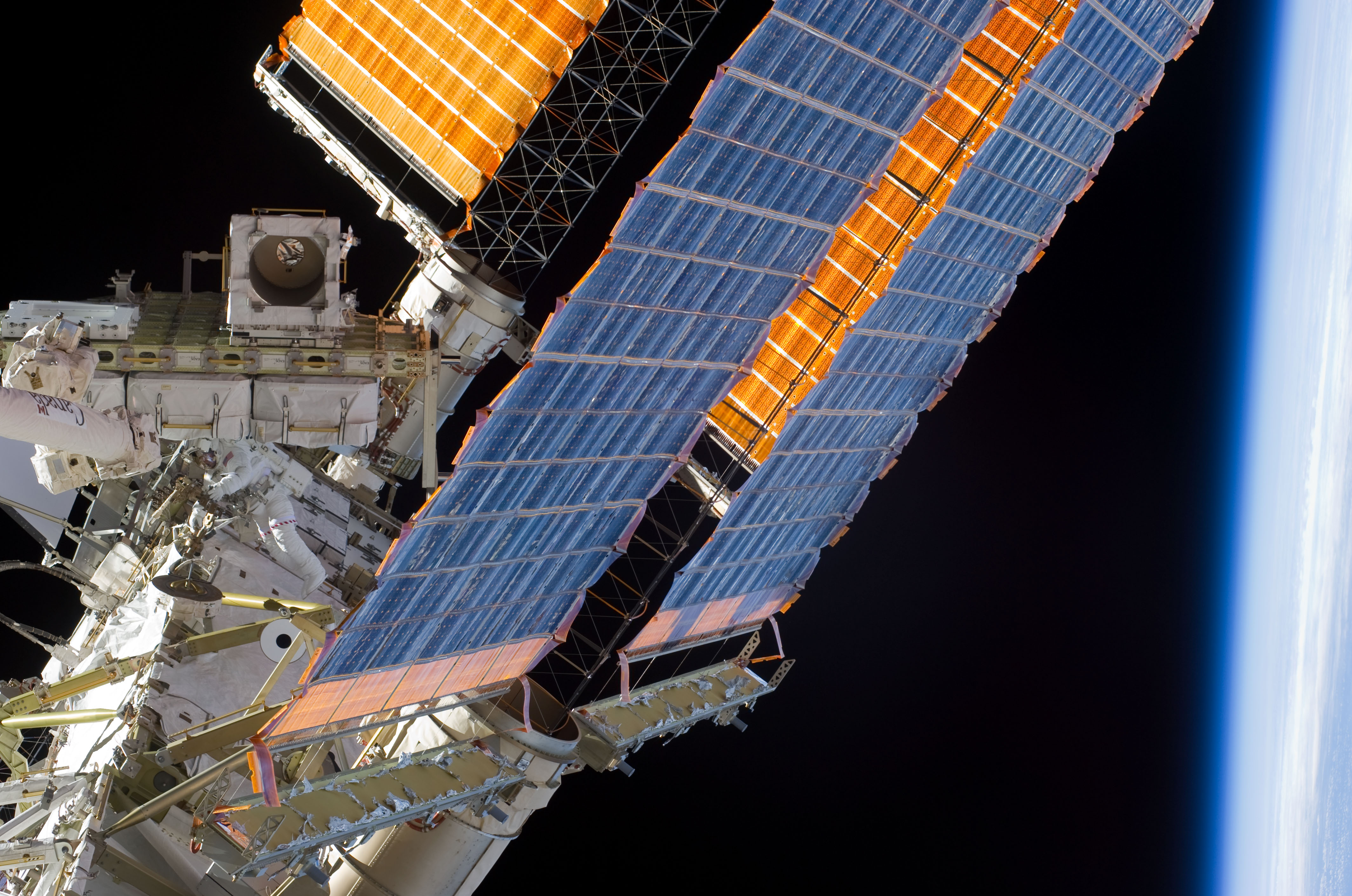
Good at work during EVA 3

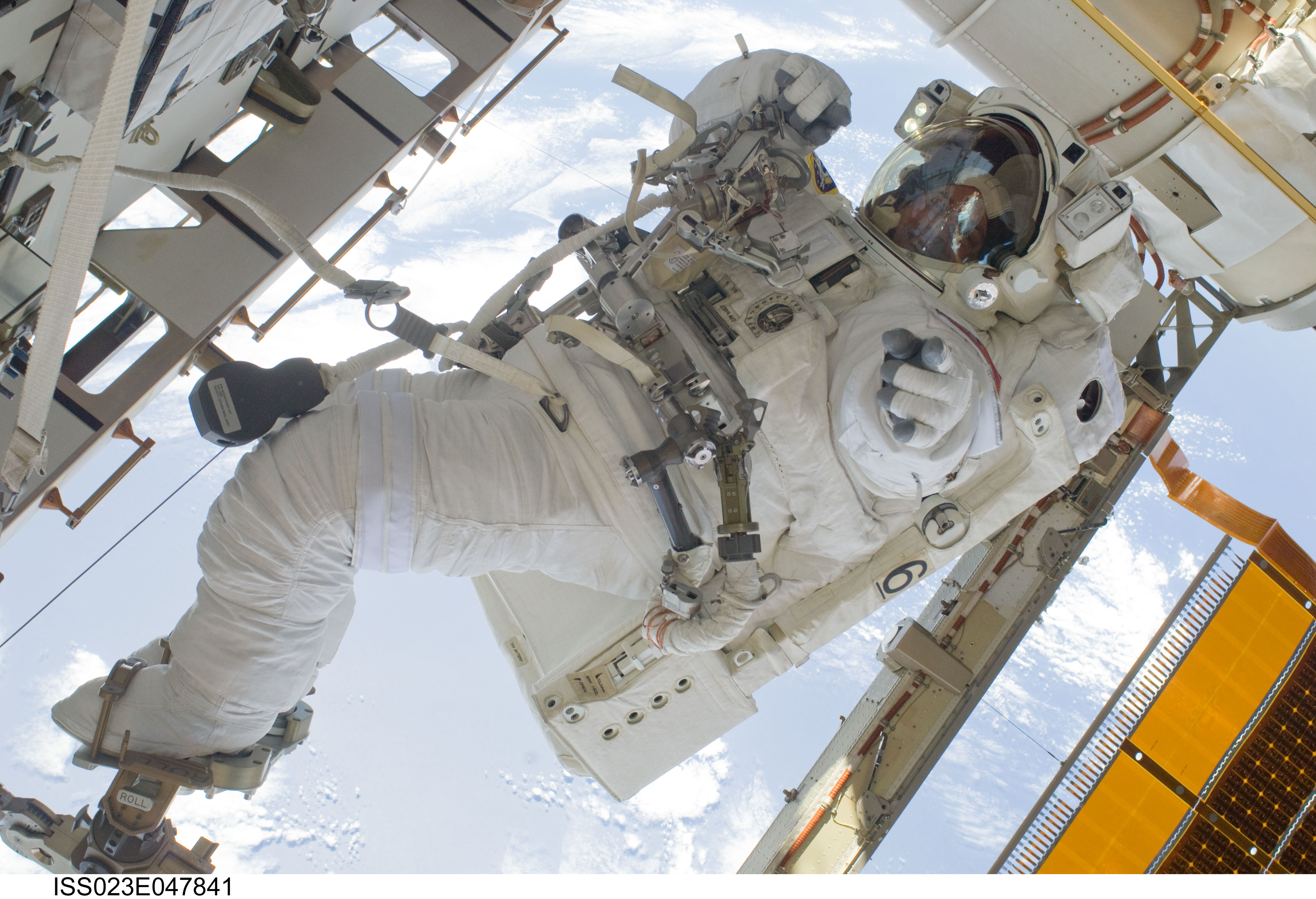
Reisman during EVA 3

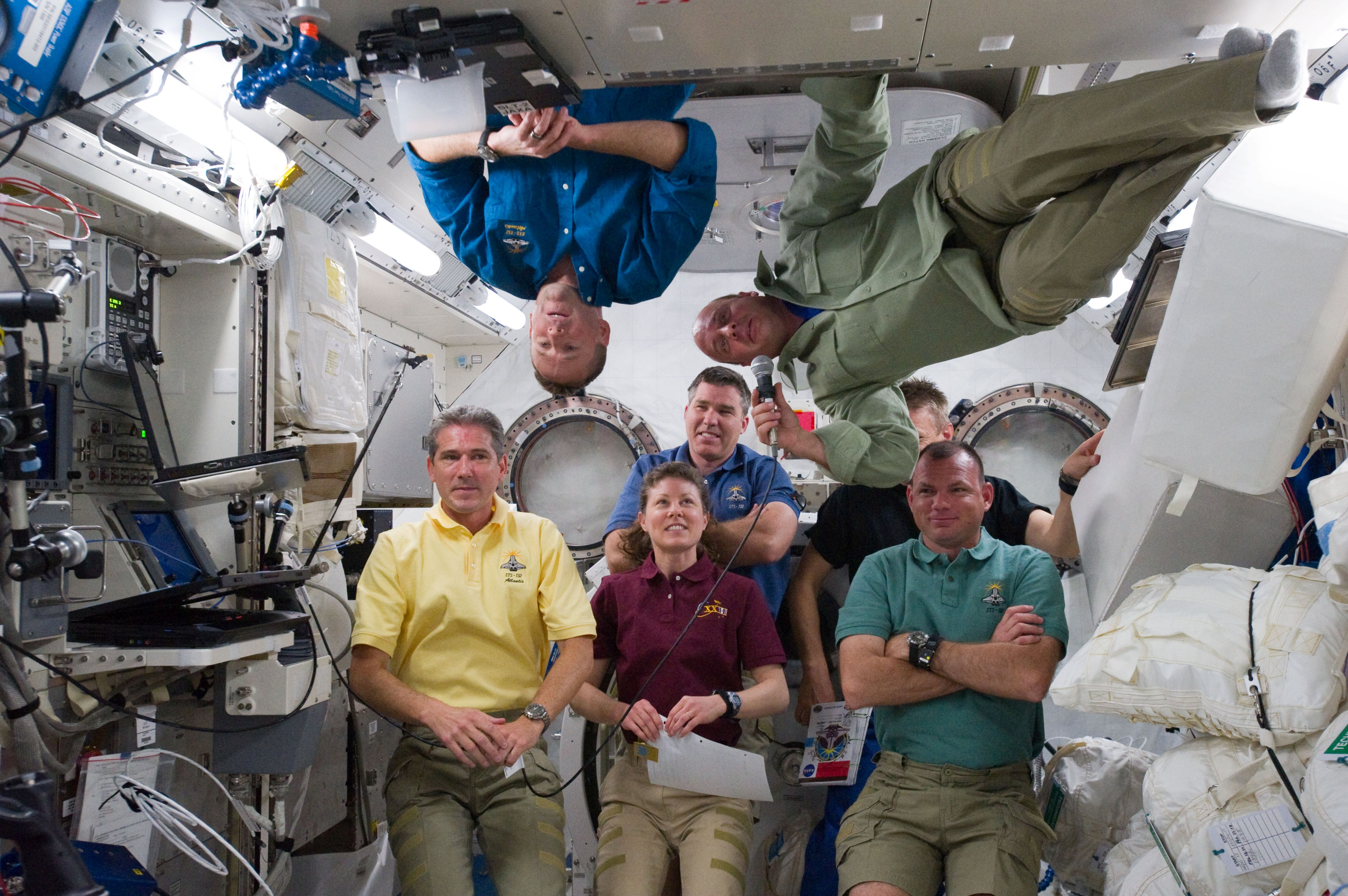
STS-132 Crew and Tracy Caldwell-Dyson during the educational event on Flight Day 9

=== May 22 (Flight day 9 – ICC-VLD re-installation and off-duty) ===
Flight day 9 saw the shuttle crew enjoying some off-duty time during the afternoon. In the morning, the entire crew participated in some transfer activities and orbiter maintenance. The ICC-VLD was also berthed back aboard Atlantis' payload bay, having completed its tasks for this mission. The Canadarm2 was used to return the ICC-VLD to the bay, and was operated by Mission Specialists Piers Sellers and Garrett Reisman and space station flight engineer Tracy Caldwell Dyson. The ICC-VLD re-installation operation began just after 4:30 am EDT, and was completed at 5:50 am EDT. The shuttle crew and Caldwell Dyson also answered some questions from elementary- and middle-school students from around the U.S. Students from 12 NASA Explorer Schools had submitted their questions earlier by video. The combined shuttle-station crew also shared a joint meal before the shuttle crew enjoyed two and a half hours of off-duty time starting at 11:05 am EDT.

=== May 23 (Flight day 10 – Undocking) ===
On flight day 10, the joint STS-132/Expedition 23 crews awoke to begin the final hours of the joint docked mission. The crews completed the final time-sensitive transfers of the mission, which included scientific research samples that need to be kept cold. Once these transfers were completed, the two crews held a joint crew news conference and took a crew photo, and later, prior to hatch closure, held a mutual farewell ceremony. After the ceremony, the hatches between Atlantis and the International Space Station were closed, and a leak check was performed to ensure all the hatches were sealed properly. The shuttle undocked from the ISS at 15:22 UTC, a little more than 2 hours after the hatches were closed. At the time of the undocking, the two spacecraft were orbiting 220 miles (350 km) above the Southern Ocean southwest of Perth, Australia. The shuttle, guided by pilot Tony Antonelli, backed away from the ISS to a distance of about 400 feet (120 m), at which time Antonelli began conducting a fly-around of the space station, so that crew members on both the ISS and shuttle could get photos of both vehicles. Once the fly-around was complete, the shuttle crew conducted two separation burns to move Atlantis away from the space station.

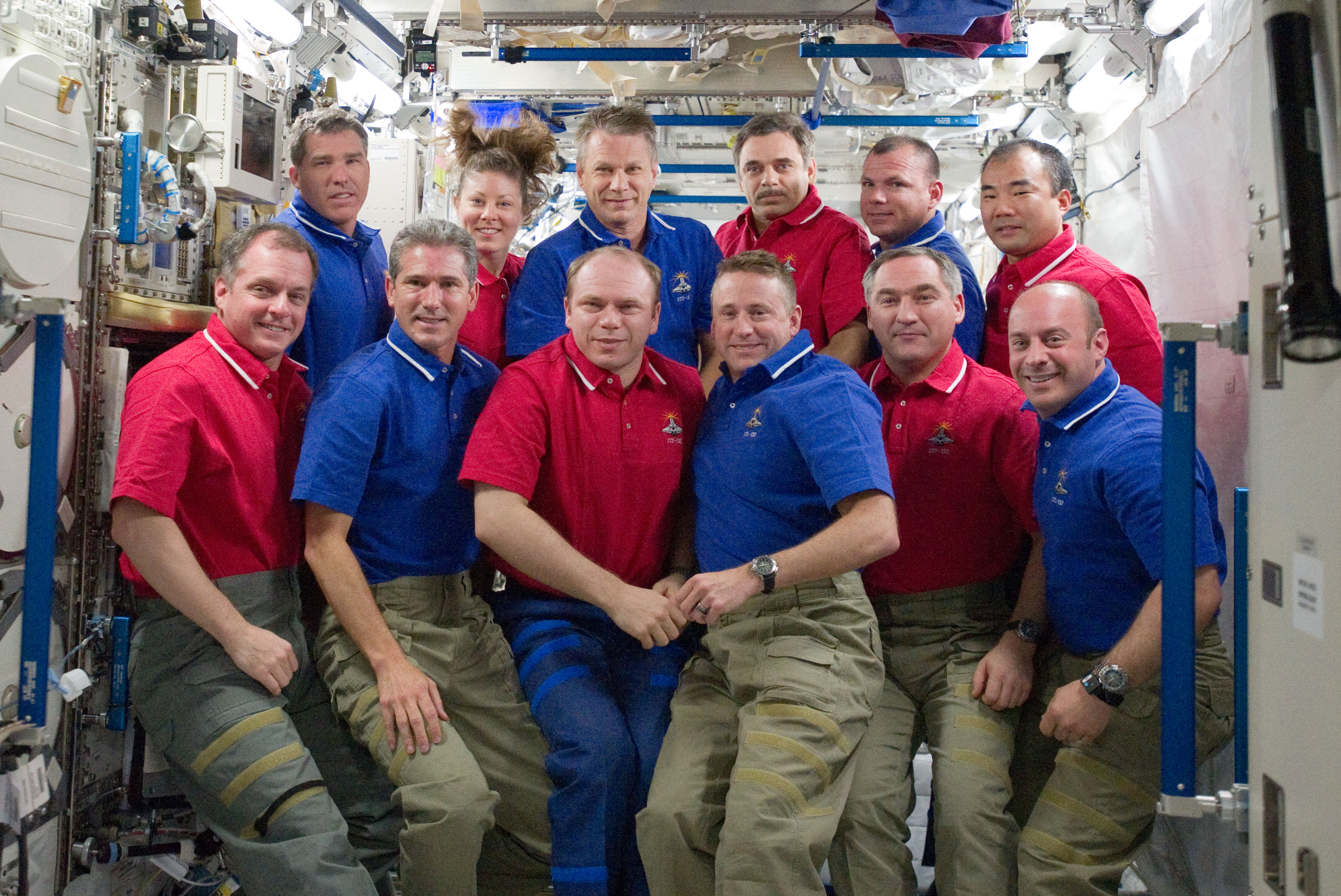
STS-132 (blue shirts) and Expedition 23 crew members pose for a group portrait on the ISS.

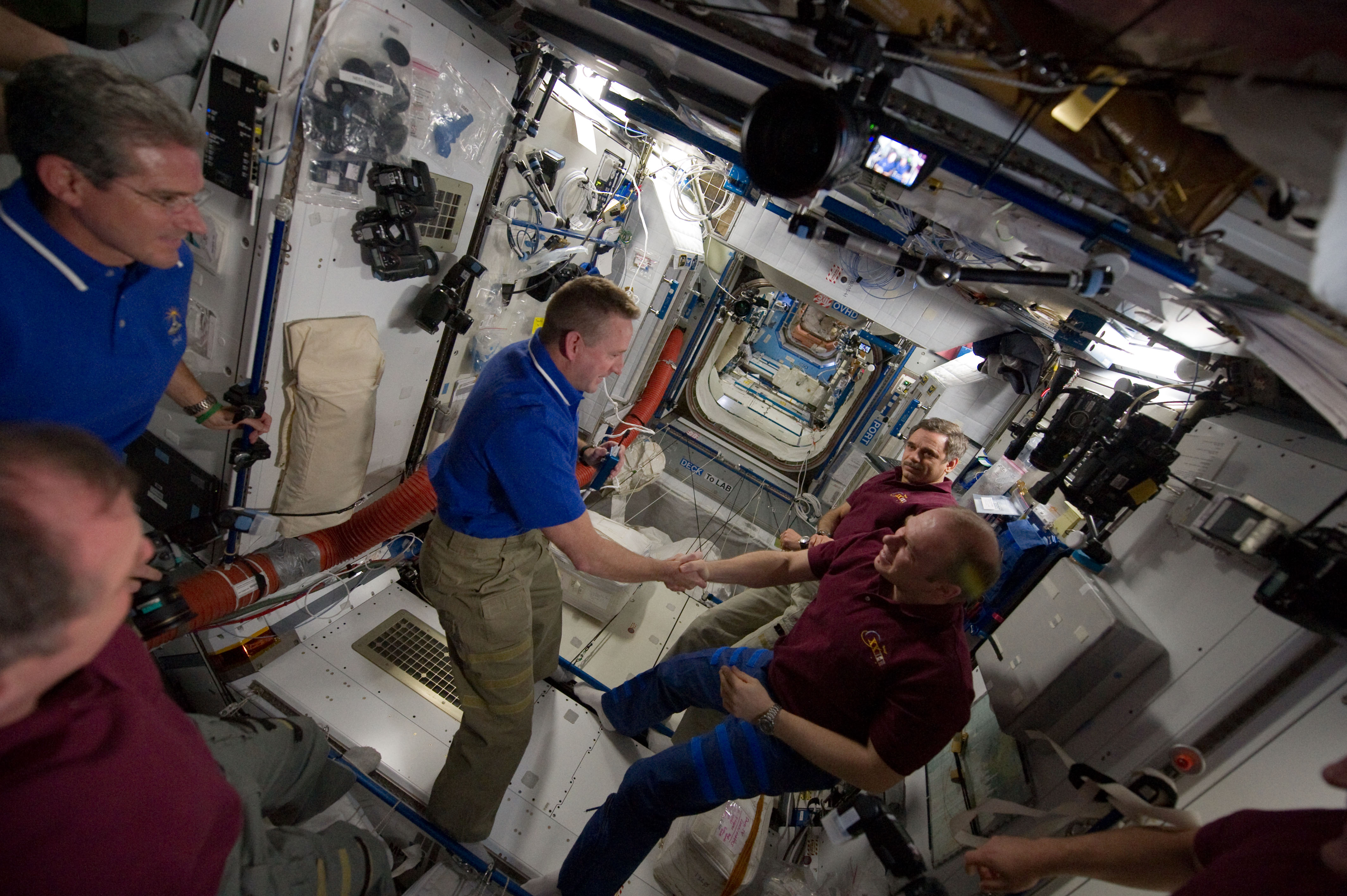
Ham and Kotov shake hands at the farewell ceremony.

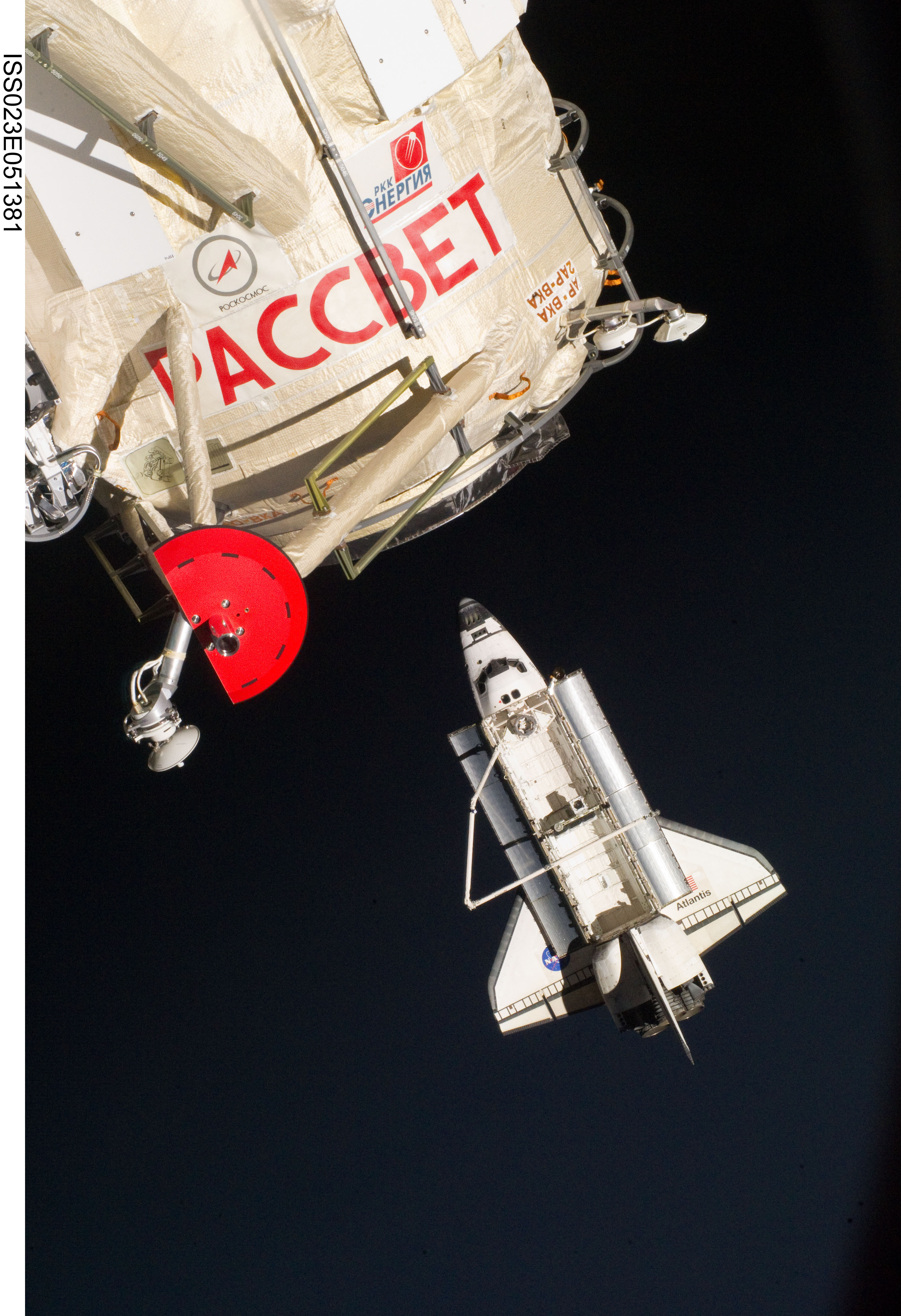
Atlantis separates from the ISS after undocking.

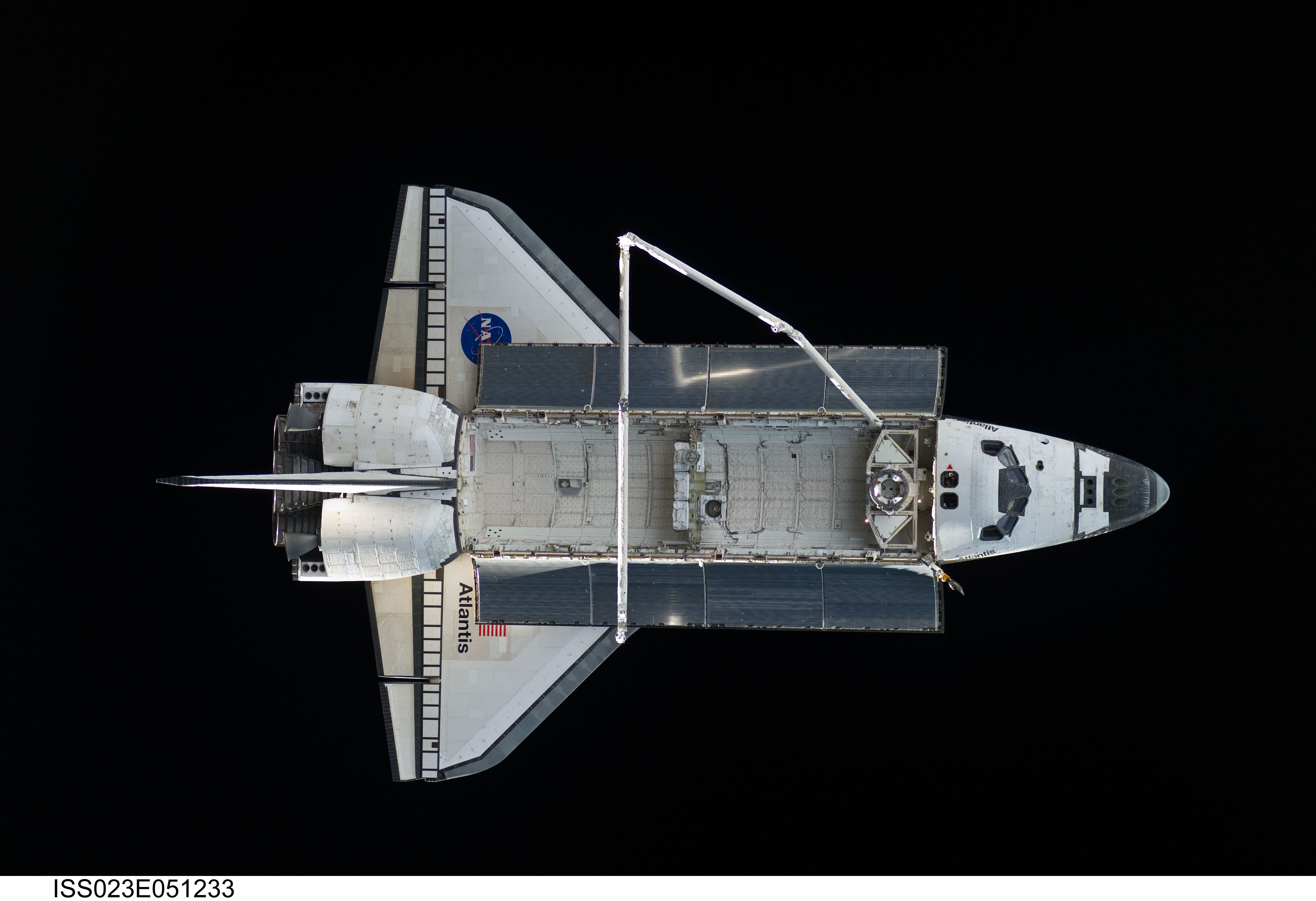
Departing Atlantis, as photographed by a station crew member

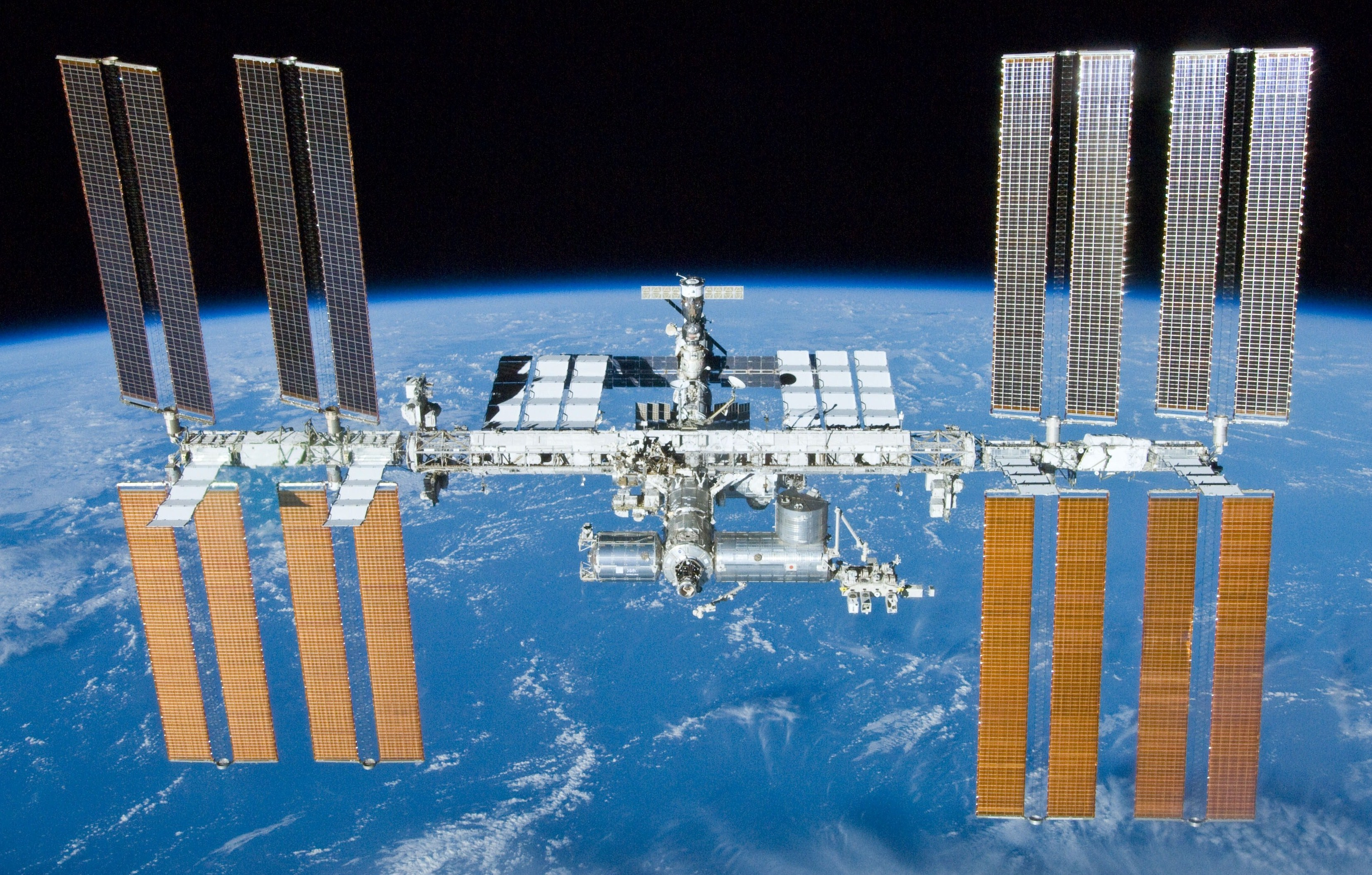
An iconic view of the ISS from the orbiter

=== May 24 (Flight day 11 – Late inspection) ===
The crew of Atlantis awoke on flight day 11, and after a couple of hours of personal time, began the late inspection of the shuttle's wing leading edges and nose cap. The crew finished the scans about two and a half hours ahead of schedule. By 09:50 UTC, they had finished their look at the right wing, by 10:52 UTC the nose cap survey was complete, and the left wing survey was finished at 11:17 UTC. The TPS survey was done using the shuttle's robotic arm and its OBSS extension. While the scans were going on, some of the crew stowed items that were no longer needed or were transferred right before undocking. Spacewalkers Mike Good and Steve Bowen cleaned up and stowed their spacesuits for landing. The latter part of the crew's day was spent with some off-duty time.

=== May 25 (Flight day 12 – Landing prep) ===
Atlantis' astronauts devoted flight day 12 to preparing for the shuttle's landing. The crew executed standard day-before-landing activities. Commander Ham, Pilot Antonelli and Mission Specialist Good began the flight control system (FCS) hot-fire checkout at about 1:40 am EDT, operating the rudder and flaps that would control Atlantis' flight through the atmosphere to the KSC runway. That complete, Ham and Antonelli fired each of the shuttle's 44 attitude control thrusters, which were designed to orient Atlantis in space as it descended from orbit and through the upper atmosphere. Both these tests were completed successfully.

All STS-132 crew members worked at various times throughout the day to stow items in the cabin to prepare for landing. They also gathered for a 30-minute deorbit briefing at 5:40 am EDT. Immediately afterward, the crew talked with representatives of the Colbert Report, ABC Radio Network, and WEWS-TV of Cleveland, Ohio.

Late in the day, Mission Specialists Reisman and Sellers stowed the K_{u} band antenna in Atlantis' cargo bay.

=== May 26 (Flight day 13 – Re-entry and landing) ===
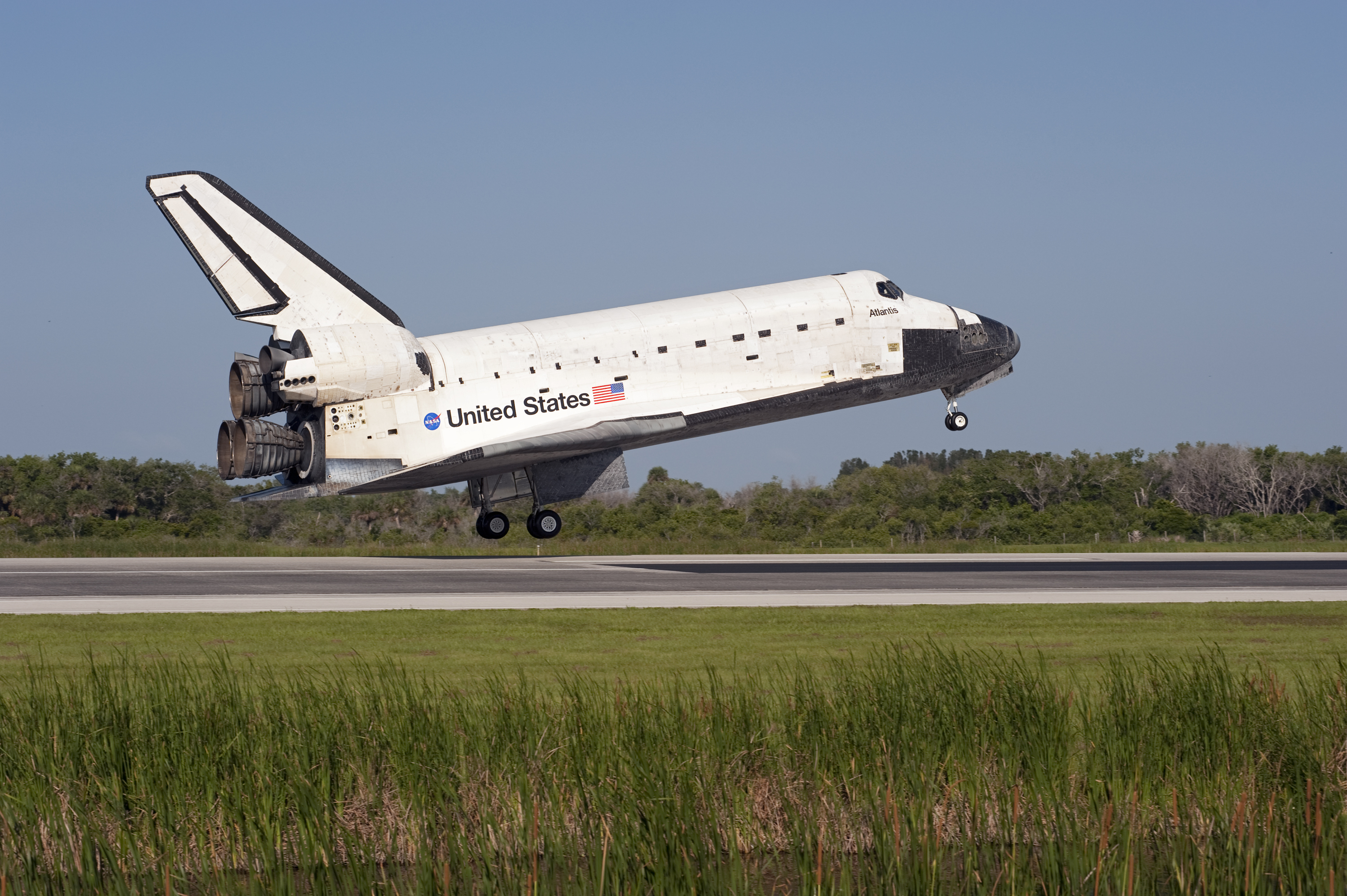
STS-132 ends as Space Shuttle Atlantis lands on May 26, 2010, at Kennedy Space Center's Shuttle Landing Facility.

Landing video (11 mins 31 secs)

The STS-132 crew awoke at 12:20 EDT (4:20 UTC). At about 7:40 UTC, the astronauts began deorbit preparations, and closed the payload bay doors at 9:01 UTC. The deorbit burn initiated at 11:42 UTC, 220 miles (350 km) above Indonesia, and terminated at 11:45. At an altitude of 400,000 feet (120,000 m) and a speed of Mach 25, Atlantis began re-entry at 12:16. At about 12:23 UTC, Atlantis began its s-rolls, to bleed off speed and energy during re-entry. At about 12:29, the shuttle was more than 40 miles (64 km) above the Earth and 2,000 miles (3,200 km) from KSC, traveling at Mach 22. At 12:34, Atlantis was about 180,000 feet (55,000 m) up, traveling at about 9,200 mph, and was 600 miles (970 km) from the runway. At about the same time, the shuttle was experiencing maximum re-entry heating conditions, peaking at about 2,900 degrees Fahrenheit, lasting about two minutes. At 12:39, long-range cameras at KSC spotted the shuttle gliding towards the runway at an altitude of 16 miles (26 km) and a distance of 77 miles (124 km) from KSC. At 12:44, commander Ken Ham took manual control of the orbiter for landing as it glided below the 50,000-foot (15,000 m) mark.

Atlantis landed on its main wheels on runway 33 of Kennedy Space Center's Shuttle Landing Facility at 08:48:11 EDT (12:48:11 UTC). The nose wheel touched down 10 seconds later, at 08:48:21 EDT (12:48:11 UTC), with the vehicle coming to a stop at 08:49:18 EDT (12:49:18 UTC). The entire mission lasted 11 days, 18 hours, 29 minutes, and 9 seconds, during which time the space shuttle traveled a total of 7,724,851 kilometers (4,800,000 mi).

The six astronauts headed to Houston on May 27. A welcome ceremony for the crew was held at 5 pm EDT that same day at Ellington Field's NASA Hangar 276.

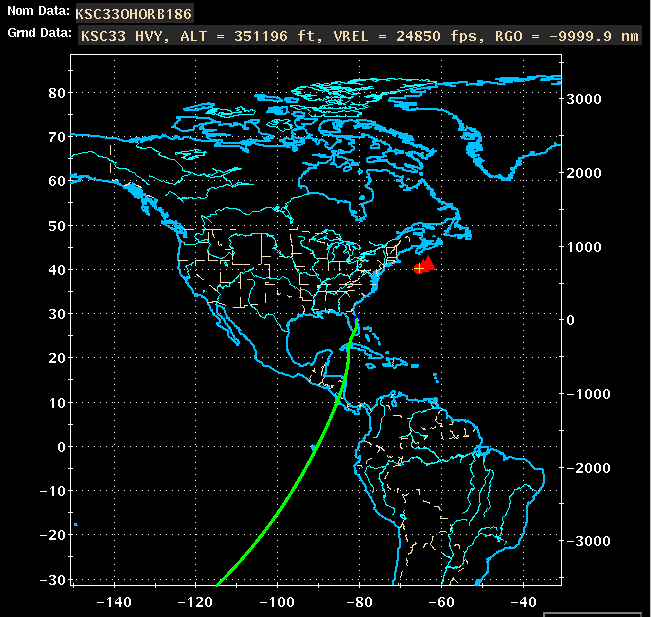
Long-range ground track

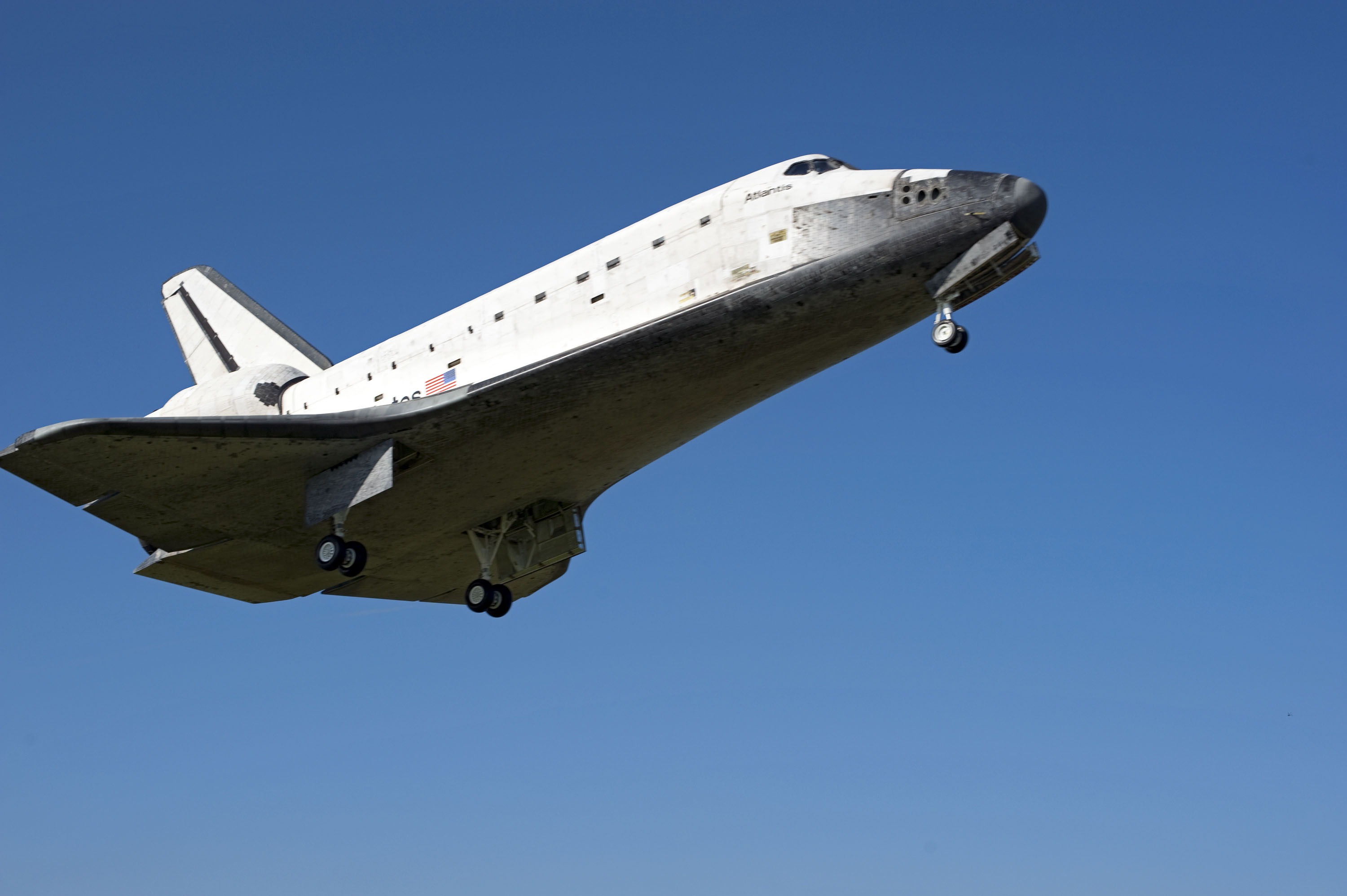
Atlantis approaches Runway 33

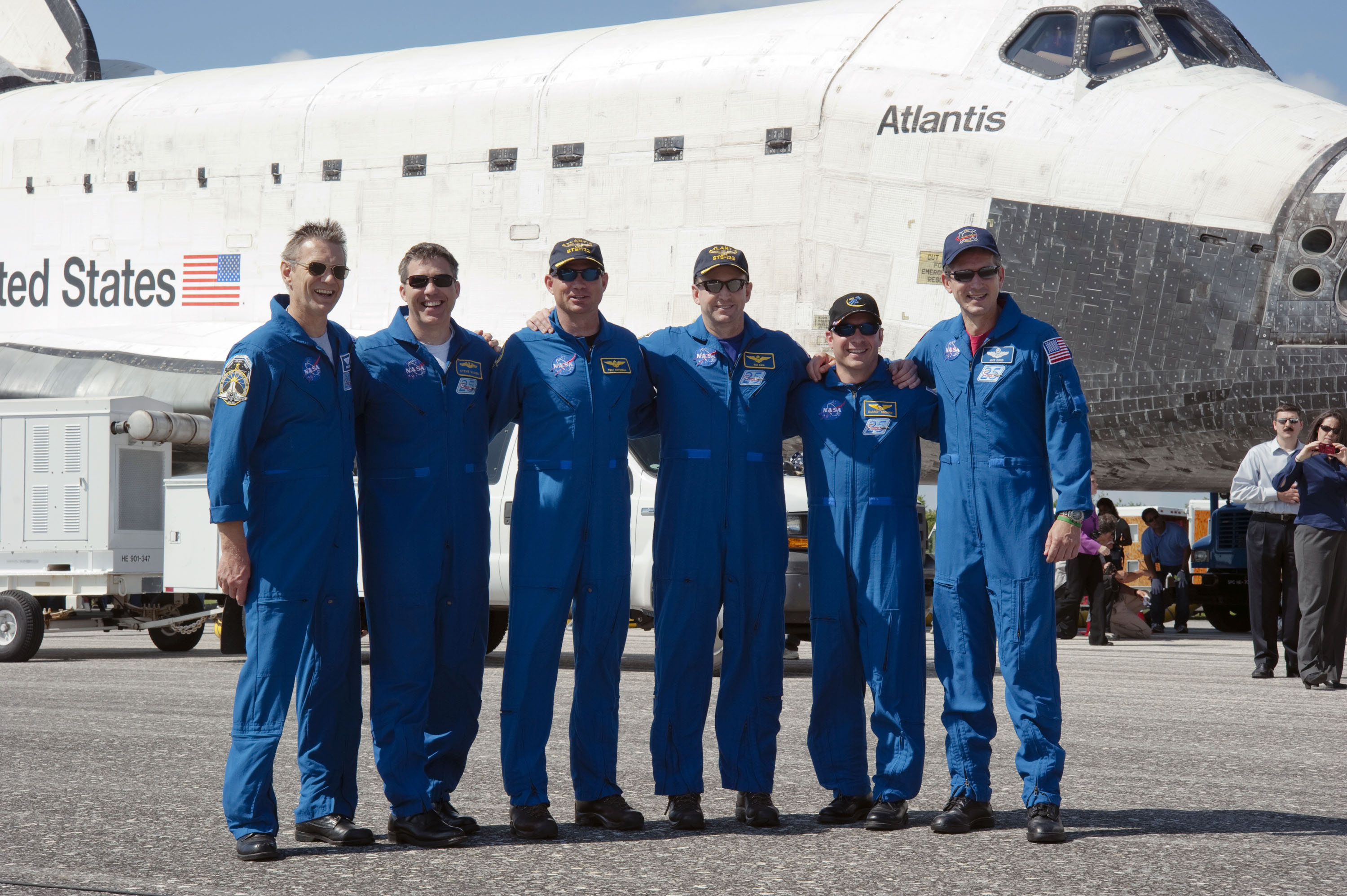
Crew pause for a post-landing photo opportunity on the tarmac

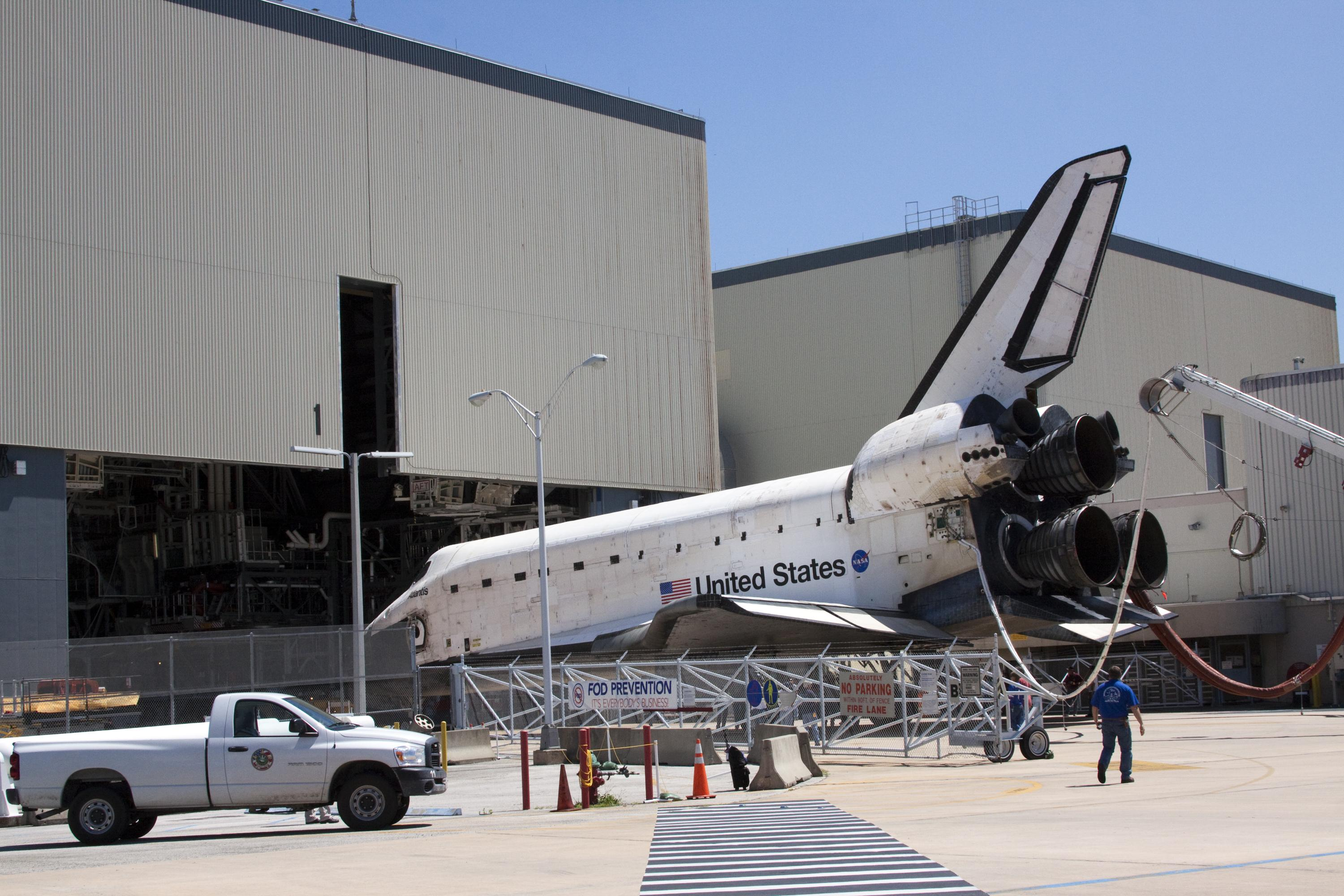
Atlantis reaches OPF-1 after landing

== Spacewalks ==
Three spacewalks were conducted to replace six aging batteries and to stage spare components outside the station, including a secondary K_{u} band antenna and spares for the Canadian Dextre robotic arm extension.

EVA	Spacewalkers	Start (UTC)	End (UTC)	Duration
EVA 1	Garrett Reisman; Steve Bowen	May 17, 2010; 11:54	May 17, 2010; 19:19	7 hours 25 minutes
EVA 1	Reisman and Bowen installed a spare space-to-ground K_{u} band antenna on the station's truss, or backbone. They then installed a new tool platform on Dextre. The spacewalkers also broke the torque on bolts holding batteries in place on the truss, in preparation for their removal and replacement on the second and third spacewalks.			
EVA 2	Steve Bowen; Michael Good	May 19, 2010; 10:38	May 19, 2010; 17:47	7 hours 9 minutes
EVA 2	Bowen and Good removed and replaced four of the six batteries on the port truss to store electricity from the solar arrays on that truss. The used batteries were installed on the cargo carrier for return to Earth on Atlantis. They also fixed a snagged cable on the Orbiter Boom Sensor System. The final task was to re-torque the bolts on the SGANT and then remove the launch locks and tether that were helping hold it in place.			
EVA 3	Michael Good; Garrett Reisman	May 21, 2010; 10:27	May 21, 2010; 17:13	6 hours 46 minutes
EVA 3	Good and Reisman first connected a liquid ammonia jumper hose. They then installed the final two new batteries on the truss and put the old batteries on the carrier. Next, they retrieved a grapple fixture from Atlantis' payload bay and brought it inside the station to be modified for future installation on the Zarya module. The pair also stowed some tools in an external toolbox outside the airlock for future spacewalks.			

== Mission insignia ==
The STS-132 mission patch was designed by NASA artist Sean Collins, working with astronaut Garrett Reisman. The patch shows Atlantis flying towards a sunset landing, with the names of the STS-132 astronauts around the border.

== STS-132 mission decal ==
During the standard post-flight inspection of Atlantis, a United Space Alliance inspector found a STS-132 mission decal accompanied by an inscription, "The first last flight of Atlantis left Earth on 14 May 2010 from Pad 39A" together with the crew's signatures. The worker had found it tucked away on the upper side of Locker A-16 while scanning the area with a mirror. Moreover, he said the note must have been written in orbit, since otherwise the author would have had to stand on their head to write it.

At the time the note was written, STS-132 was the last planned mission of Atlantis. However, one further mission was ultimately approved for the shuttle: STS-135, which was to be the last flight of both Atlantis and the Space Shuttle program.

== Wake-up calls ==
NASA began a tradition of playing music to astronauts during the Gemini program, and first used music to wake up a flight crew during Apollo 15. Each track is specially chosen, often by the astronauts' families, and usually has a special meaning to an individual member of the crew, or is applicable to their daily activities.

Flight Day	Song	Artist	Played for	Links
Day 2	"You're My Home"	Billy Joel	Kenneth Ham	WAV, MP3; TRANSCRIPT
Day 3	"Sweet Home Alabama"	Lynyrd Skynyrd	Dominic A. "Tony" Antonelli	WAV, MP3; TRANSCRIPT
Day 4	"Alive Again"	Matt Maher	Michael T. Good	WAV, MP3; TRANSCRIPT
Day 5	"Macho Man"	Village People	Garrett Reisman	WAV, MP3; TRANSCRIPT
Day 6	"Start Me Up"	The Rolling Stones	Piers Sellers	WAV, MP3; TRANSCRIPT
Day 7	"Welcome to the Working Week"	Elvis Costello	Steve Bowen	WAV, MP3; TRANSCRIPT
Day 8	"Travelin' Light"	JJ Cale	Piers Sellers	WAV, MP3; TRANSCRIPT
Day 9	"Shine"	Matt Redman	Michael T. Good	WAV, MP3; TRANSCRIPT
Day 10	"These Are Days"	10,000 Maniacs	Dominic A. "Tony" Antonelli	WAV, MP3; TRANSCRIPT
Day 11	"Theme from Wallace and Gromit"	Julian Nott	Steve Bowen	WAV, MP3; TRANSCRIPT
Day 12	"Empire State of Mind"	Jay-Z	Garrett Reisman	WAV, MP3; TRANSCRIPT
Day 13	"Supermassive Black Hole"	Muse	Kenneth Ham	WAV, MP3; TRANSCRIPT

== See also ==
- 2010 in spaceflight
- List of human spaceflights
- List of International Space Station spacewalks
- List of Space Shuttle missions
- List of spacewalks 2000–2014
