= Progress M-UM =

2021 Russian resupply spaceflight to deliver Prichal to the ISS

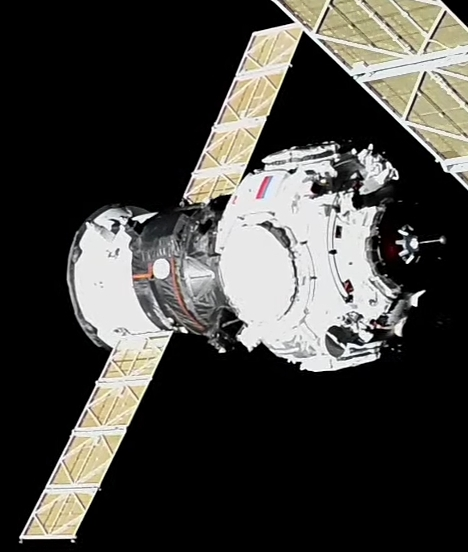
- Progress M-UM docking to ISS
- Names: Прогресс М-УМ
- Mission type: Prichal module delivery
- Operator: Roscosmos
- COSPAR ID: 2021-111A
- SATCAT no.: 49499
- Mission duration: 28 days and 15 hours

Spacecraft properties
- Spacecraft: Progress M-UM No. 303
- Spacecraft type: Progress-M (modified with hardware from Progress MS)
- Manufacturer: Energia
- Launch mass: 8,180 kg (18,030 lb)
- Payload mass: 5,350 kg (11,790 lb)

Start of mission
- Launch date: 24 November 2021, 13:06:35 UTC
- Rocket: Soyuz 2.1b
- Launch site: Baikonur, Site 31/6
- Contractor: Progress Rocket Space Centre

End of mission
- Disposal: Deorbited
- Decay date: 23 December 2021, 04:30:54 UTC

Orbital parameters
- Reference system: Geocentric orbit
- Regime: Low Earth orbit
- Inclination: 51.65°

Docking with ISS
- Docking port: Nauka nadir
- Docking date: 26 November 2021, 15:19 UTC
- Undocking date: 22 December 2021, 23:03 UTC
- Time docked: 26 days, 7 hours, 44 minutes (delivery craft)

Payload
- Prichal: 4,650 kg (10,250 lb); Cargo: 584.1 kg (1,288 lb)
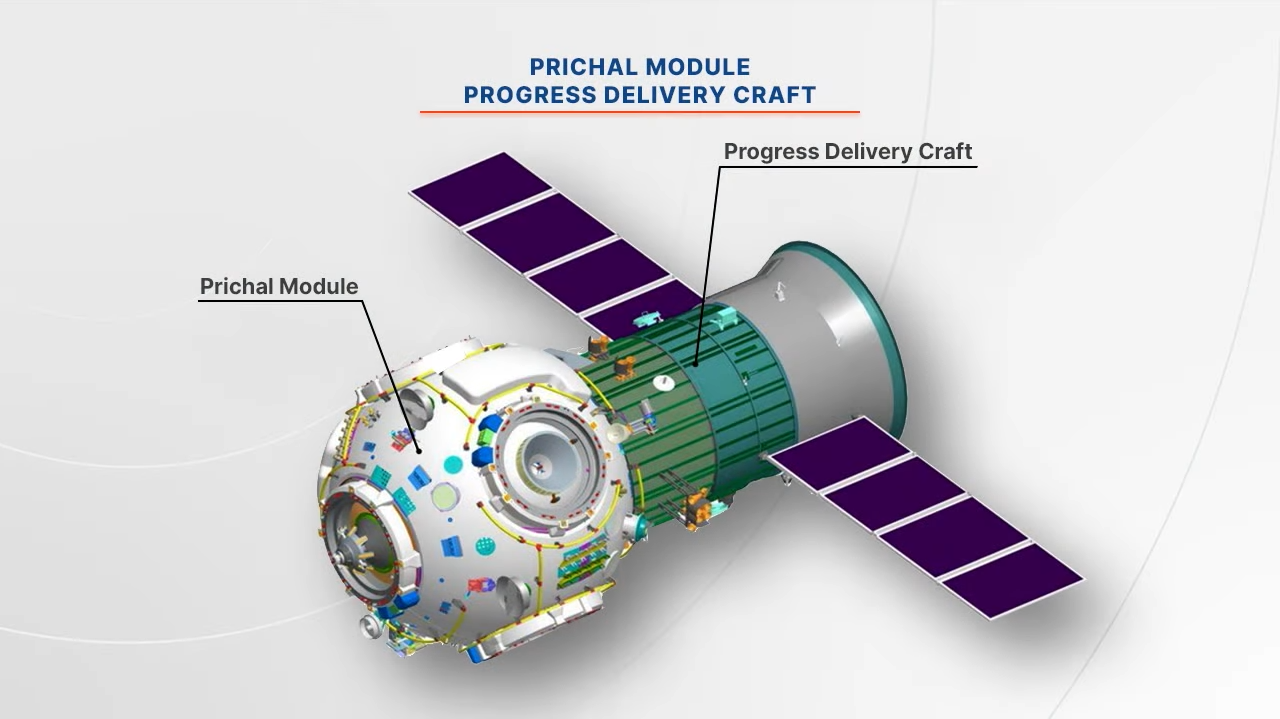
- Diagram of Progress M-UM spacecraft Progress ISS Resupply

External image
- Prichal module / Progress M-UM launch mission logo

Progress M-UM (Russian: Прогресс М-УМ), was a specially modified Progress M, Russian production No.303, used to deliver the Prichal module to the Russian Orbital Segment (ROS) of the International Space Station (ISS). It was launched on 24 November 2021 at 13:06:35 UTC. The spacecraft consisted of a Progress M propulsion compartment, with the pressurized cargo section of the spacecraft removed to accommodate Prichal. This was the 171st flight of a Progress spacecraft. It was the final flight of a Progress M and the first launch of a Progress spacecraft on a Soyuz 2.1b.

== Development ==
On 15 January 2011, RKK Energia announced that its Scientific and Technical Council (NTS) had reviewed and approved the preliminary design of the Node Module and associated hardware, including a special version of the Progress cargo ship designated the Progress M-UM spacecraft module, intended for the delivery of the Node Module to the station. The space payload section for the Progress M-UM was dubbed KGCh. The Soyuz-2 launch vehicle was adapted for the launch of the Progress M-UM spacecraft module, originally envisioned to take place in 2012, then 2019. It was eventually signed off as completed in 2014 and kept in storage until processing and attachment with Prichal began for a launch in 2021. It is attached to the Prichal module by means of a newly developed transition compartment.

The Prichal module was the second addition to the ROS in 2021. Earlier modules were delivered and added in a similar manner. Progress M-UM is similar in design to Progress DC-1, which delivered Pirs in 2001 and Progress M-MIM2, which delivered Poisk in 2009, but with navigational systems and avionics hardware taken from the Progress MS variant.

== Launch ==
A Soyuz-2.1b launched Progress M-UM to the International Space Station from Baikonur Site 31/6 on 24 November 2021, at 13:06:40 UTC for delivery of the Prichal module. Due to the larger diameter of the Prichal module, the Progress M-UM was launched in a 4.1 m (13 ft) wide ST-type fairing.

== Docking ==
Two days after launch, Progress M-UM automatically docked Prichal to the re-configured nadir (or Earth-facing) port of the Nauka module after removal of the module's nadir docking adapter by Progress MS-17. Progress M-UM, was later undocked and deorbited after 28 days and 15 hours in space.

== Expansion of Russian Orbital Segment ==
The ISS flight manifest drafted by Roscosmos at the end of summer 2020 set the launch of the Prichal module for 6 September 2021, with the docking to Nauka's nadir port two days later. However, on 1 December 2020, the launch of Prichal slipped to three and four months after the Nauka. The planned launch date was on 24 November 2021.

One port on Prichal is equipped with an active hybrid docking port, which enables docking with the Nauka module. The remaining five ports are passive hybrids, enabling docking of Soyuz and Progress vehicles, as well as heavier modules and future spacecraft with modified docking systems. Eight spacewalks will follow in 2022 to complete the integration of the Nauka and Prichal modules into the Russian Orbital Segment.

== Undocking ==
The Progress M-UM propulsion section remained docked at the station for 26 days. The propulsion section then undocked, revealing Prichal's nadir docking port for future Russian spacecraft.

== Atmospheric entry ==
The propulsion section re-entered the atmosphere of Earth for destruction over the South Pacific Ocean, on 23 December 2021, at 04:30:54.

== Gallery ==
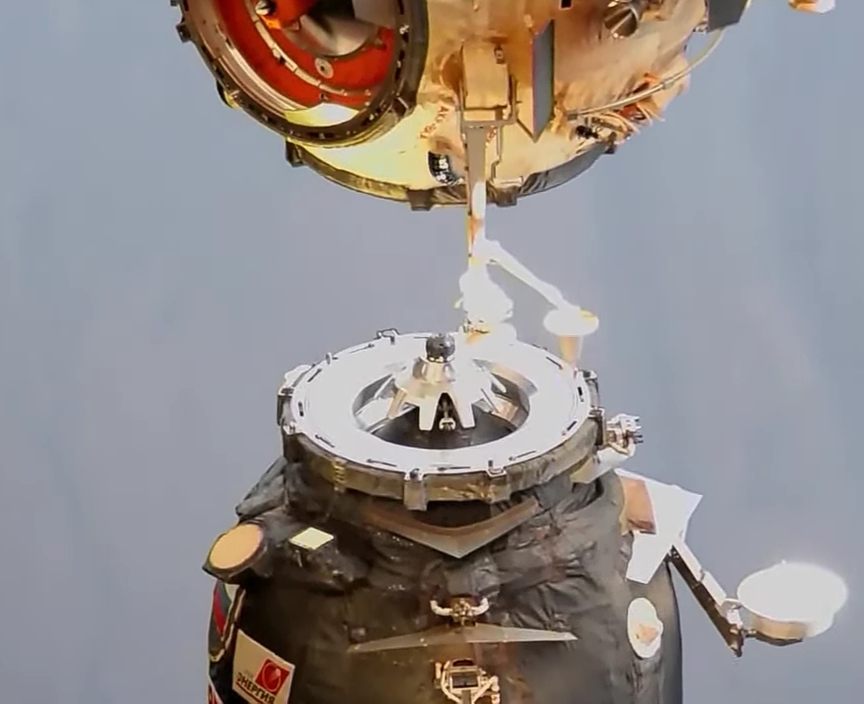
Progress MS-17 removing Nauka's temporary docking adapter in preparation for the arrival of Progress M-UM

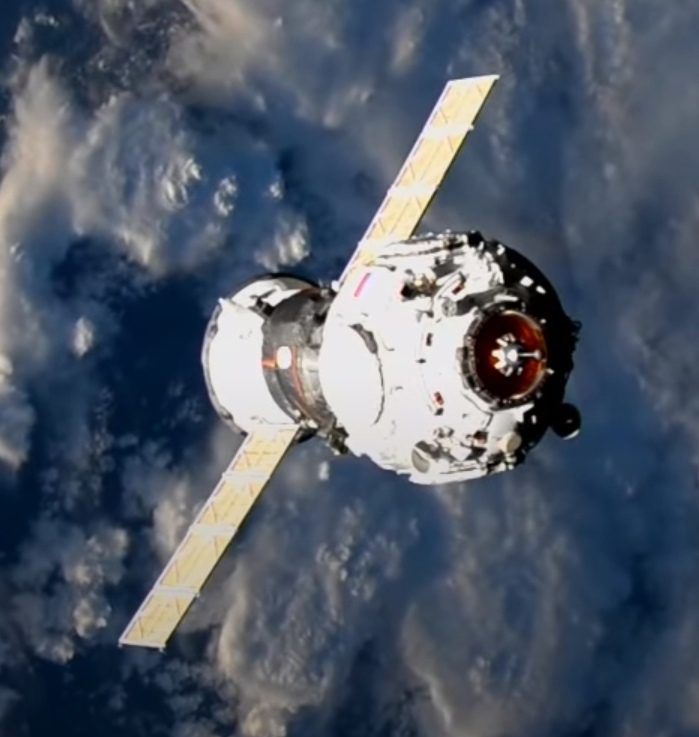
Progress M-UM approaching the ISS

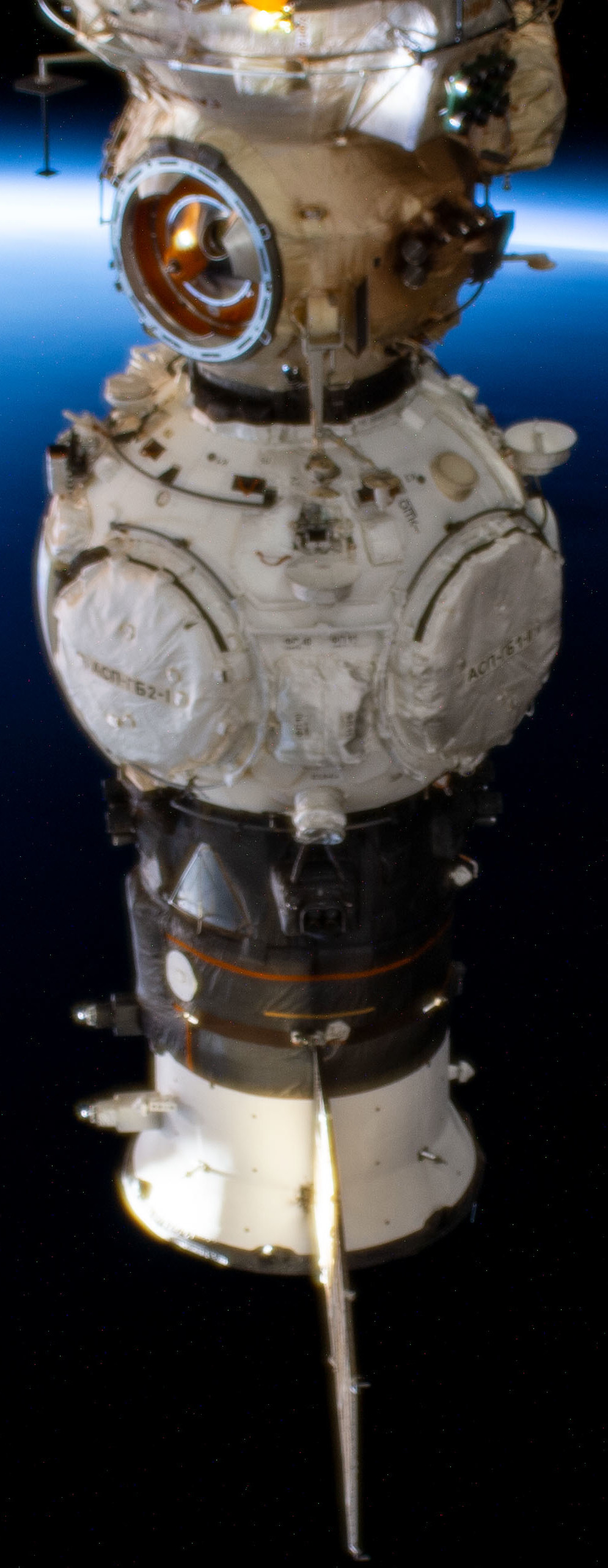
Progress M-UM docked to the ISS

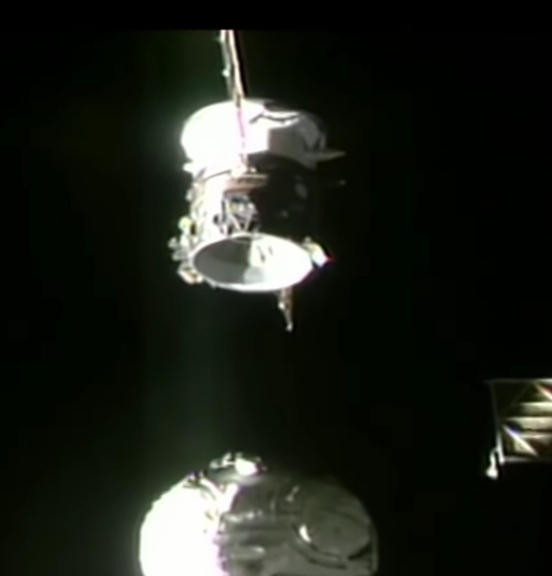
Progress M-UM propulsion section separating from Prichal

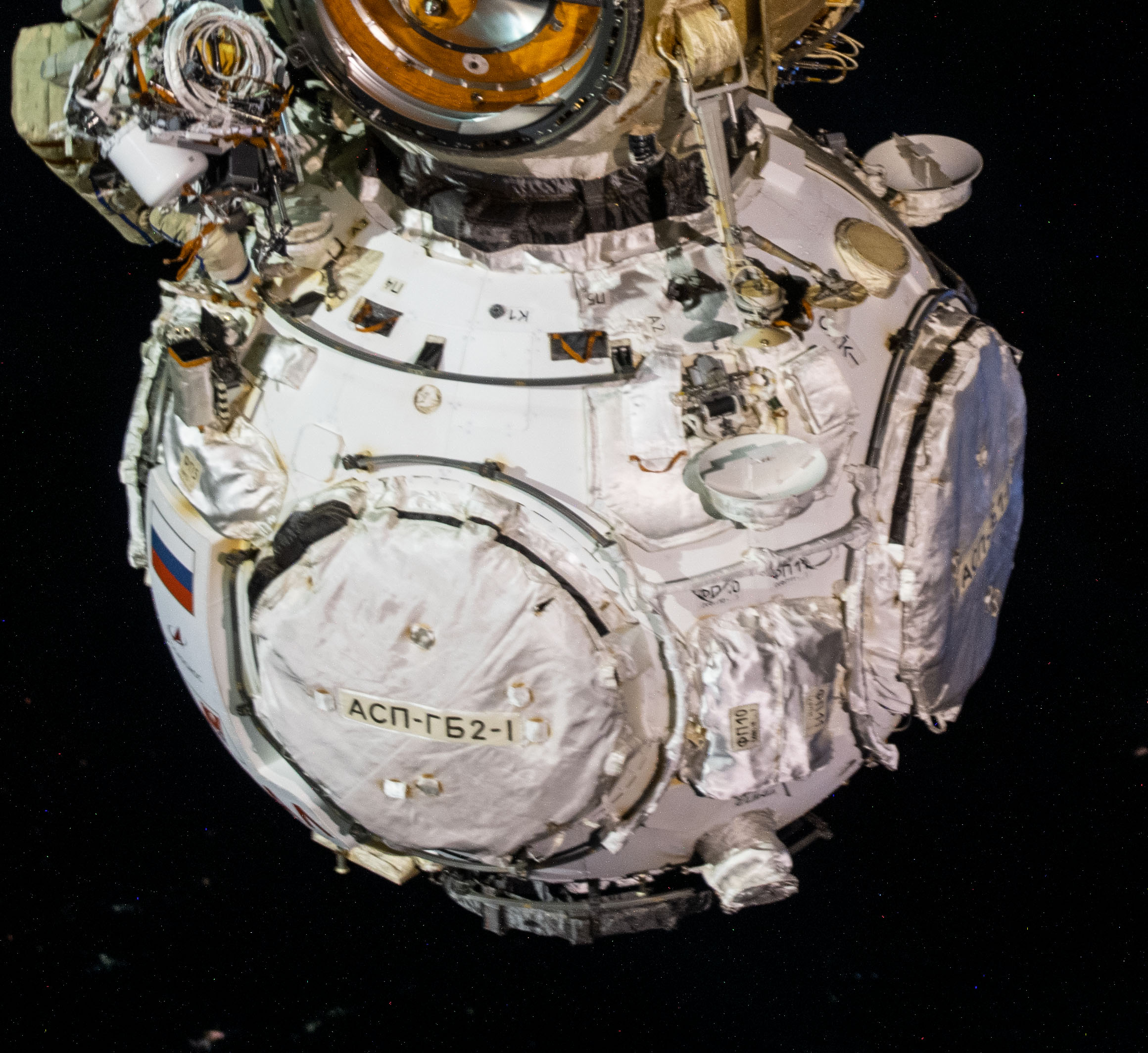
Prichal in its final location

== See also ==
- Prichal (ISS module)
- Uncrewed spaceflights to the International Space Station
- Orbital Piloted Assembly and Experiment Complex - proposed complex (scrapped in September 2017)
- Universal Docking Module - former name Uzlovoy Module (eventually Prichal)
