= Progress MS-17 =

2021 Russian resupply spaceflight to the ISS

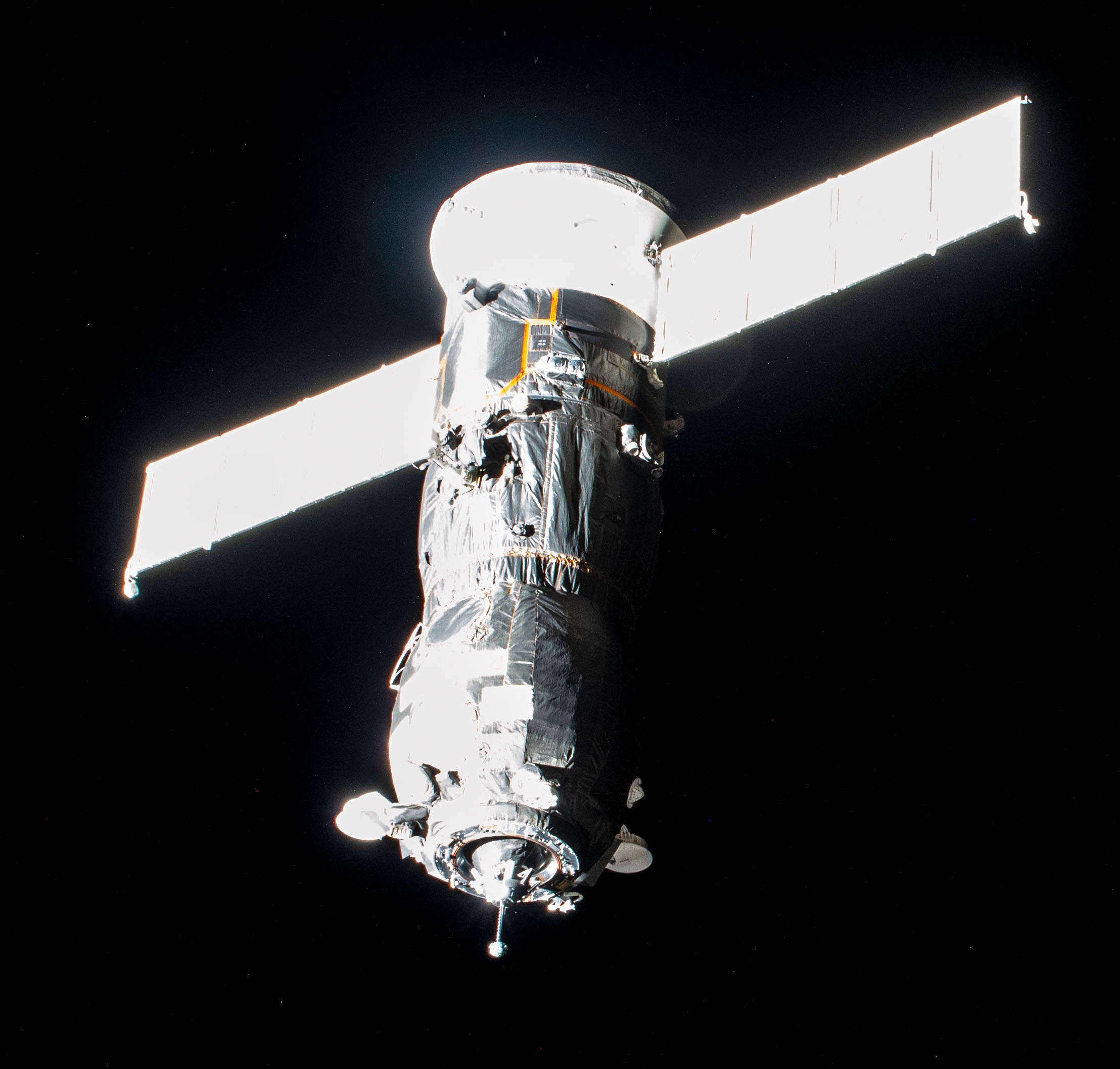
- Progress MS-17 approaches the ISS
- Names: Прогресс МC-17; Progress-78P
- Mission type: ISS resupply
- Operator: Roscosmos
- COSPAR ID: 2021-057A
- SATCAT no.: 48869
- Mission duration: 149 days

Spacecraft properties
- Spacecraft: Progress MS-17 No.446
- Spacecraft type: Progress MS
- Manufacturer: Energia
- Launch mass: 7,000 kg (15,000 lb)
- Payload mass: 2,439 kg (5,377 lb)

Start of mission
- Launch date: 29 June 2021, 23:27:20 UTC
- Rocket: Soyuz-2.1a
- Launch site: Baikonur, Site 31/6
- Contractor: RKT Progress

End of mission
- Disposal: Deorbited
- Decay date: 25 November 2021, 14:34 UTC

Orbital parameters
- Reference system: Geocentric orbit
- Regime: Low Earth orbit
- Inclination: 51.65°

Docking with ISS
- Docking port: Poisk zenith
- Docking date: 2 July 2021, 00:59 UTC
- Undocking date: 20 October 2021, 23:42 UTC
- Time docked: 110 days, 22 hours, 43 minutes

Docking with ISS (Relocation)
- Docking port: Nauka nadir
- Docking date: 22 October 2021, 04:21:07 UTC
- Undocking date: 25 November 2021, 11:22 UTC
- Time docked: 34 days and 7 hours

Cargo
- Mass: 2,439 kg (5,377 lb)
- Pressurised: 1,509 kg (3,327 lb)
- Fuel: 470 kg (1,040 lb)
- Gaseous: 40.5 kg (89 lb)
- Water: 420 kg (930 lb)

Progress MS-17 (Russian: Прогресс МC-17), Russian production No. 446, identified by NASA as Progress 78P, was a Progress spaceflight operated by Roscosmos to resupply the International Space Station (ISS). This was the 169th flight of a Progress spacecraft.

== History ==
The Progress-MS is a crew-less freighter based on the Progress-M featuring improved avionics. This improved variant was first launched on 21 December 2015. It has the following improvements:

- The new external compartment enables it to deploy satellites. Each compartment can hold up to four launch containers. First time installed on Progress MS-03.
- Enhanced redundancy thanks to the addition of a backup system of electrical motors for the docking and sealing mechanism.
- Improved Micrometeoroid (MMOD) protection with additional panels in the cargo compartment.
- Luch Russian relay satellites link capabilities enable telemetry and control even when not in direct view of ground radio stations.
- GNSS autonomous navigation enables real-time determination of the status vector and orbital parameters dispensing with the need of ground station orbit determination.
- Real-time relative navigation thanks to direct radio data exchange capabilities with the space station.
- New digital radio that enables enhanced TV camera view for the docking operations.
- The Ukrainian Chezara Kvant-V on board radio system and antenna/feeder system has been replaced with a Unified Command Telemetry System (UCTS).
- Replacement of the KURS-A with KURS-NA digital system.

== Launch and first docking ==
A Soyuz-2.1a launched the Progress MS-17 to the ISS from Baikonur Site 31 on 29 June 2021. Progress MS-17 automatically docked to Russian Orbital Segment (ROS) of ISS on the Poisk zenith port, on 2 July 2021, where it remained until 21 October 2021 after which it was relocated to another Russian Orbital Segment port, the Nauka nadir.

== Background and film project ==
On 14 May 2021, the Interagency Committee approved the composition of the ISS main and alternate crews for the period 2021–2023. Cosmonaut Anton Shkaplerov (commander) and the crew of the film "The Challenge": actress Yulia Peresild and director Klim Shipenko, will go to the ISS on the Soyuz MS-19. The drama is a joint project of Roscosmos, Channel One and the Yellow, Black and White studio. The alternates chosen after passing the medical committee are: New Drama Theater actress Alyona Mordovina, director Alexei Dudin and the commander Oleg Artemyev. Since 24 May 2021, the crew members have been training at the Yuri Gagarin Cosmonaut Training Center. On 23 July 2021, the prime crew participated in a four-hour simulation inside a Soyuz replica while wearing the Sokol suit and on 28 July 2021, the back-up crew completed the same exercise. According to the commander, Oleg Artemyev, the performance of the two back-up Spaceflight Participants was outstanding. On 30 July 2021, the spacecraft had its pre-launch preparation started. On 31 August 2021, the medical committee announced that both the main and reserve crew were healthy for space flight.

The filming equipment was launched by Progress MS-17.

The director and actress returned to Earth on 17 October 2021 on Soyuz MS-18, with commander Oleg Novitskiy. Cosmonaut Pyotr Dubrov and astronaut Mark Vande Hei, who arrived at the ISS on Soyuz MS-18, will join Shkaplerov on the landing of Soyuz MS-19. Soyuz MS-19 is scheduled to land on 28 March 2022.

=== Reactions ===
The film, which according to Dmitry Rogozin, head of Roscosmos, is an "experiment to see if Roscosmos can prepare two ordinary people to fly in about 3 or 4 months" has received opposition from the scientific and aerospace communities, as to the fact that they remove trained cosmonauts from their flights, a misuse of public money, or even that using the station's resources for non-scientific purposes would be illegal. Sergei Krikalev, director of crewed programs at Roscosmos, reportedly lost his position by speaking out against the project, but was reinstated after a few days following protests from cosmonauts on and off active duty.

=== Movie ===
Klim Shipenko shot approximately 35–40 minutes of film on the ISS, in addition to serving as director, operator, art director, and makeup artist. Oleg Novitsky and Pyotr Dubrov appear in the film, with Dubrov and Mark Vande Hei assisting in the production. Shkaplerov appears in some scenes of the movie.

== Second docking ==
On 3 February 2021, the State Commission for Testing of the Piloted Space Systems, chaired by Roscosmos head Dmitry Rogozin, approved the latest ISS schedule for 2021 and the first quarter of 2022.

Due to the air leak discovered in the PrK chamber at the aft port of the Zvezda service module, Roscosmos moved the docking destination for the Progress MS-17 cargo ship to the Nauka module. After 110 days, Progress MS-17 was undocked on 20 October 2021, at 23:42 UTC. It spent 29 hours in autonomous flight, waiting for ballistic conditions for docking, and re-docked to the nadir (Earth-facing) port of Nauka on 22 October 2021, at 04:21:07 UTC.

A long relocation was done since the Progress spacecraft cannot do the quick routine relocation as the Soyuz are capable of. Nor can they fly around the ISS, because it is made only to safely operate after the spacecraft had entered a narrow cone-shaped zone extending from the main axis of a destination port that is Nauka nadir in this case. So, Progress spacecraft are allowed to move away from the station before it would naturally be brought back into a close proximity with the station around a day later. This method is cheaper in fuel consumption, but to complete the rendezvous it has to depend on the on navigation signals it gets from GLONASS and GPS satellites and on the KURS-NA rendezvous system for the final approach to its relocated destination.

== Expansion of Russian Orbital Segment ==
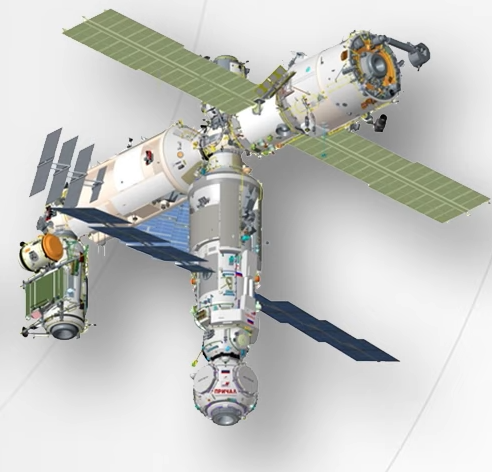
ISS Russian orbital segment after docking of UM Prichal module

This relocation will allow Roscosmos to prepare for the next step in the expansion of the Russian Orbital Segment, this time with the Prichal module. Upon the launch of Prichal (Progress M-UM), launched on 24 November 2021, the Progress MS-17 will be undocked from Nauka's nadir port, carrying with it a special extension on Nauka's docking mechanism, which was custom-designed for cargo ships and crew vehicles. Prichal, though is the second module after Rassvet to use a port initially used by Soyuz or Progress spacecraft, it is not able to dock to SSVP-G ports like Rassvet module. As a result, the Prichal module with its active hybrid docking port will then be able to dock only to the port after its reconfiguration on Nauka on 25 November 2021. This will provide a wider module passageway than was available through the adapter, which will be discarded with Progress MS-17. If everything goes according to the August 2020 plan, Progress MS-17 will log 149 days in space.

== Cargo ==
The Progress MS-17 spacecraft is loaded with 2,439 kg (5,377 lb) of cargo, with 1,509 kg (3,327 lb) of this being dry cargo.

- Dry cargo: 1,509 kg (3,327 lb)
- Fuel: 470 kg (1,040 lb)
- Oxygen: 40.5 kg (89 lb)
- Water: 420 kg (930 lb)

== Undocking and decay ==
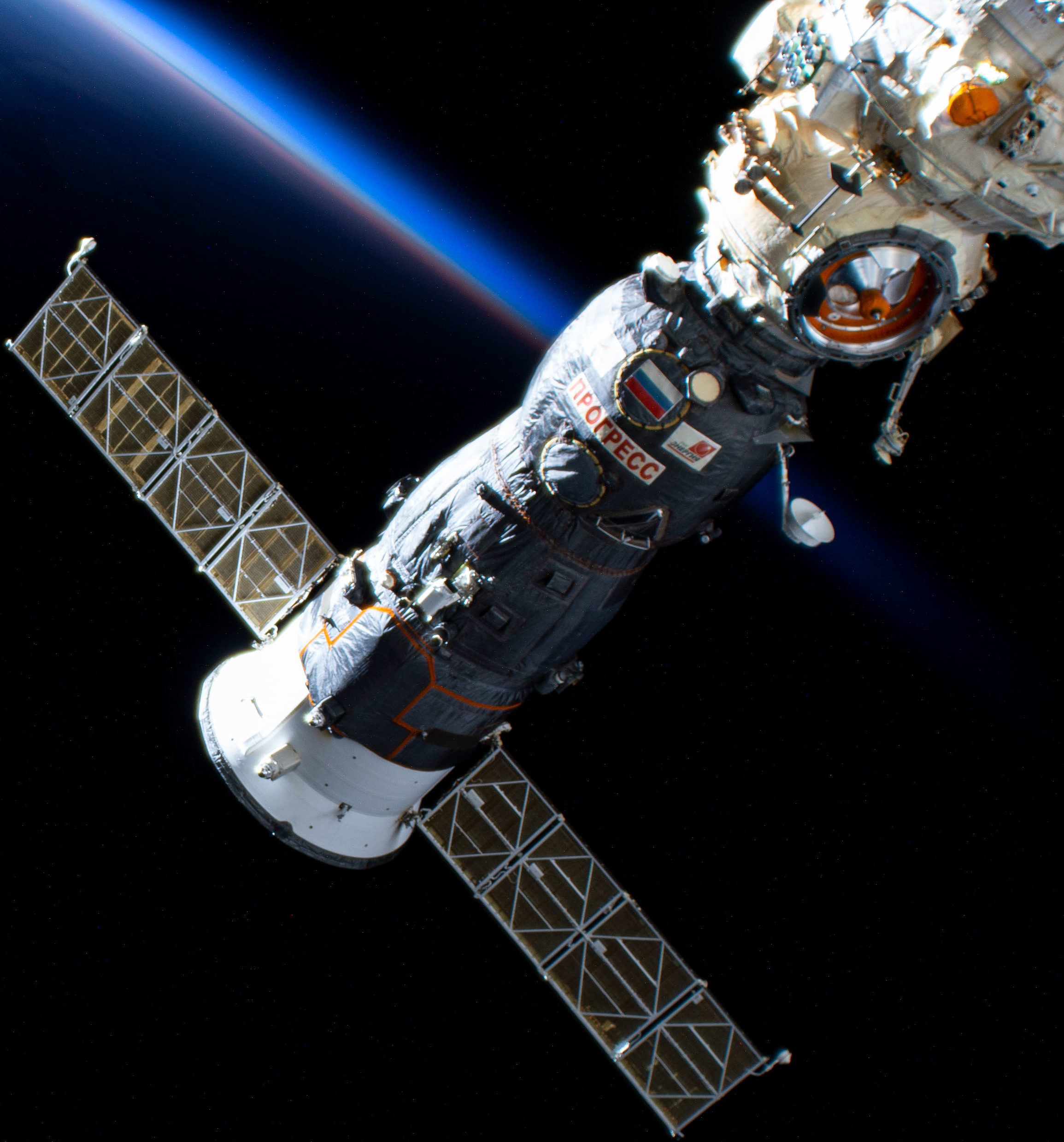
Russia's ISS Progress 78 cargo craft is pictured docked to the Nauka. At its departure, the port was reconfigured by it. (Note: The port had the temporary docking adapter before the SSVP-M or "Hybrid" standard, consisting of the traditional SSVP-G probe‑and‑drogue soft-dock mechanism and an APAS-95 hard-dock collar before Progress M-UM arrival)

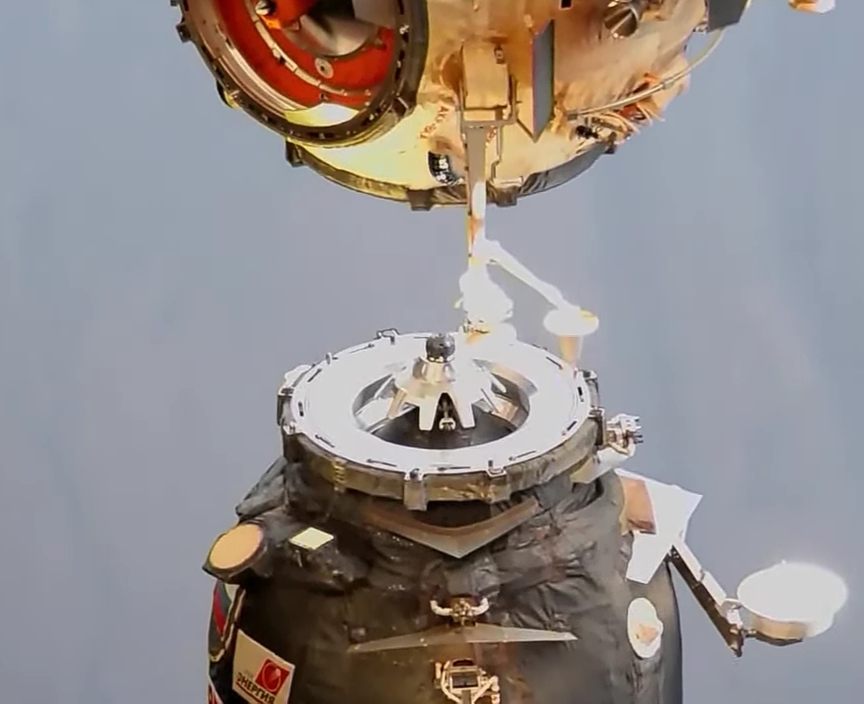
Progress MS 17 undocking and Nauka nadir temporary docking adapter Removal from ISS (Note: temporary docking adapter is the grey ring surrounding the docking probe of Progress MS-17)

The Progress MS-17 remained docked at the station until 25 November 2021, when it left with garbage and a docking adapter at the nadir port of Nauka for the arrival of Progress M-UM taking with it the module Prichal, launched on 24 November 2021, Progress MS-17 thus entered in the atmosphere of Earth for its destruction over the South Pacific Ocean.

== See also ==
- Uncrewed spaceflights to the International Space Station
