= Mir-2 =

Proposed Russian space station

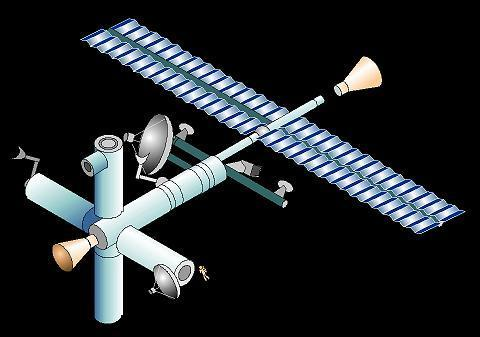
- One concept of Mir-2

Station statistics
- Crew: 2-3, up to 6 (two longstay typical)
- Mission status: Canceled, project converted into International Space Station
- Mass: 90,000 kg
- Length: 59.3 m
- Width: 36.2 m
- Height: 17.7 m
- Periapsis altitude: 350 km (220 mi)
- Apoapsis altitude: 450 km (280 mi)
- Orbital inclination: 64.8 deg

Mir-2 was a Soviet space station project which began in February 1976. Some of the modules built for Mir-2 have been incorporated into the International Space Station (ISS). The project underwent many changes, but was always based on the DOS-8 base block space station core module, built as a back-up to the DOS-7 base block used in the Mir station. The DOS-8 base block was eventually used as the Zvezda module of the ISS. Its design lineage extends back to the original Salyut stations.

== Project history ==
=== The evolution of the Mir-2 project ===
==== 1981 to 1987: KB Salyut Mir-2 ====
The prototype of the central module was as Polyus. Mir-2 would be capable of docking at least four modules in ordinary operation.

==== December 14, 1987: NPO Energia Mir-2 ====
Designated as OSETS (Orbital Assembly and Operations Centre). The station would be built in a 65 degree orbit and consist of 90 ton modules.

- Launch 1 – DOS 8, providing housing for the assembly crew.
- Launch 2 – 90 ton module.
- Launch 3 – Truss and solar arrays.
- Launches 4 to 6 – additional 90 ton modules.

==== 1991: "Mir-1.5" ====
This would involve launch of the DOS-8, after which the Buran shuttle would grapple the module, rendezvous with Mir, and attach it to the old DOS-7 base block. This plan was later altered so that DOS-8 would maneuver and dock itself to Mir. It would remain attached for two years.

==== 1992: "Mir-2" ====
The station would consist of the DOS-8 core module and a cross beam called the NEP (Science Power Platform). This was equipped with MSB retractable solar panels, Sfora thruster packages and small scientific packages.

Four 3 to 4 ton modules were planned:

- Docking Module - with the APDS universal androgynous docking system, and a side hatch for space walks
- Resource Module - Equipped with gyrodynes for orienting the station and a passive docking port for docking of Soyuz or Progress ferry spacecraft
- Technology Module - with materials experiments
- Biotechnology Module

==== November 1993: International Space Station built around Mir-2 ====
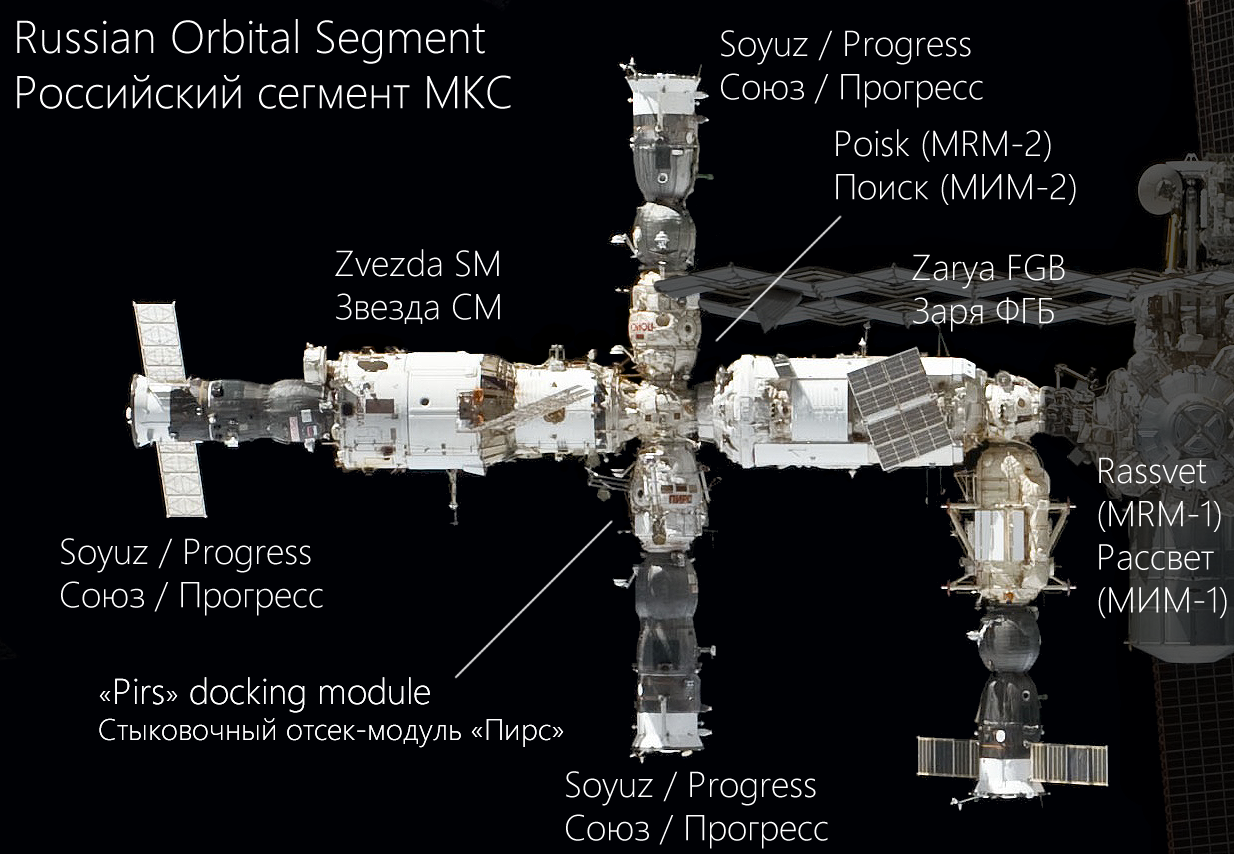
The Russian Orbital Segment in 2011

Russian elements of the International Space Station include:

- Zarya FGB, the first element launched. This was a US-funded TKS-derived propulsion module built by KB Salyut.
- Zvezda Service Module - this is the DOS-8 block, which was launched as the third major ISS module in July 2000.
- SO-1 Pirs - one of the docking modules originally designed for Buran/Mir-2 was added to the station in September 2001, and later deorbited in July 2021 to make room for Nauka.
- SO-2 Poisk - a module similar to Pirs. Poisk also provides extra space for scientific experiments, and power-supply outlets and data-transmission interfaces for external scientific payloads.
- Rassvet - the only module delivered by NASA shuttle, in a barter exchange for the launch 'owed' for Zarya. Rassvet was built from a test article for the pressurized shell portion of NEP. It is used for cargo storage, science, and as a docking port for visiting spacecraft.
- Nauka FGB-2 - this is Russia's largest module and only module dedicated wholly to science, and was launched in July 2021, with the European Robotic Arm attached.
- Prichal UM - the 'nodal module', meant to host four additional laboratory and power modules and a docking port as part of the since-cancelled OPSEK plan. It launched in November 2021.

== See also ==
- List of space stations

Preceded by Mir	Mir-2 project design 14 December 1987 - November 1993	Succeeded by Russian Orbital Segment
