= Universal Docking Module =

Once-proposed portion of the International Space Station

The Universal Docking Module (UDM) (Russian: Универсальный стыковочный модуль), was a planned Russian docking module for the International Space Station, to be jointly built by RKK Energia and Khrunichev. The Prichal nodal addition to the Nauka laboratory, the eventual form of the FGB-2 design upon which the UDM was based, grew out of this proposal.

== History ==
The original design resembled Zarya but was larger. It would be docked to the nadir (Earth-facing) Zvezda service module docking port, and have four docking ports to accommodate the two Russian Research Modules and the SO2 docking compartment, later named Poisk.

Because one Russian Research Module was cancelled due to lack of funds, this module was also cancelled. The one remaining Research Module was then scheduled to be fitted to the open docking port on Zvezda. Later it was also cancelled and that port was allocated to the Docking and Cargo Module, later named Rassvet. Rassvet's scheduled location was later moved to Zarya, while Poisk was moved to the zenith docking port on Zvezda.

== See also ==
- Prichal (ISS module)
