= Docking Module =

Docking Module may refer to:

- Docking Compartment, mostly implied for space stations
- Docking Module for Mir
