= SSVP =

SSVP may refer to:

- Society of Saint Vincent de Paul, an international Catholic charitable organization
- SSVP docking system, the standard "probe-and-drogue" docking mechanism of Russian spacecraft
- Sree Sankara Vidyapeetam is a senior secondary school located in Mattanur, Kerala, India
