= Russian Orbital Station =

Proposed Russian space station

Russian Orbital Station Российская орбитальная станция
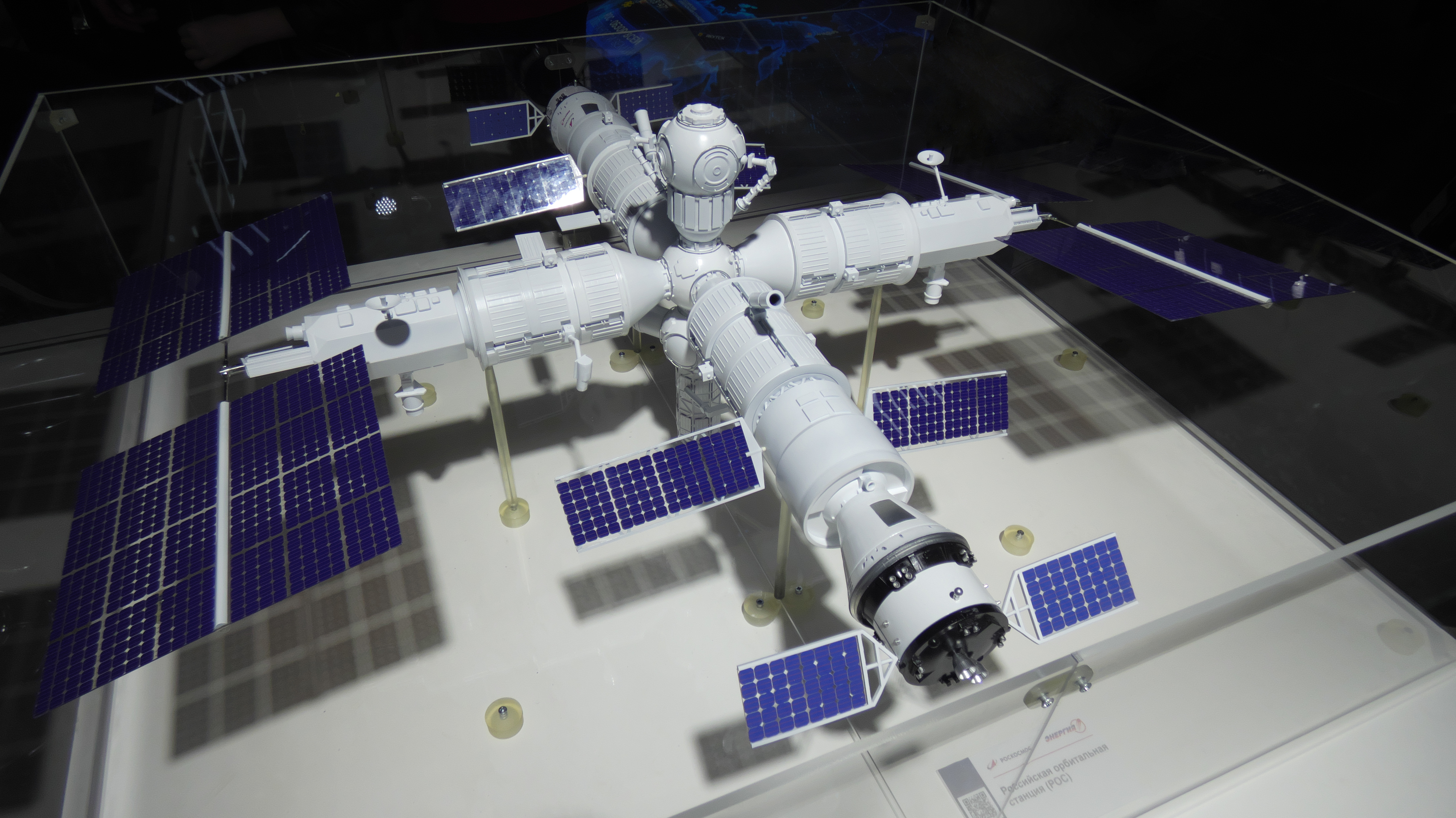
- Previously planned layout of ROS from 2017–2025

Station statistics
- Crew: 3 or more
- Launch: 2028–2035 (planned)
- Carrier rocket: Angara A5M, Proton-M, Soyuz-2.1b
- Launch pad: Baikonur Cosmodrome
- Orbital inclination: 51.6°
- Typical orbit altitude: 400 km (planned)

External images
- First stage vision 2025-2030
- Second stage vision 2030-2035

The Russian Orbital Station (Russian: Российская орбитальная станция, Rossiyskaya orbital'naya stantsiya; ROS, Russian: РОС), previously known as the Russian Orbital Service Station, is a proposed Russian orbital space station scheduled to begin construction in 2028. Initially an evolution of the Orbital Piloted Assembly and Experiment Complex (OPSEK) concept, ROS developed into plans for a new standalone Russian space station built from scratch without modules from the Russian Orbital Segment of the ISS. However, in December 2025, Oleg Orlov announced that ROS will once again be assembled as part of the ISS, and will be separated from the rest of the station shortly before it is scheduled to be deorbited by 2030.

== Overview ==
In April 2021, Roscosmos officials announced plans to possibly exit from the International Space Station programme after 2024, stating concerns about the condition of its aging modules. On 26 July 2022, Roscosmos announced that the decision had been made to withdraw from the ISS programme after 2024. A new space station, named Russian Orbital Space Station, operated entirely by Roscosmos, would be launched starting in the mid-2020s.

In December 2024, Roscosmos head Yury Borisov stated crewed flights to the ROS would be launched starting in 2028, simultaneously with the completion of the ISS programme as coordinated with NASA.

ROS was originally planned to operate at a 400 km (250 mi) high, Sun-synchronous orbit with an inclination of about 98 degrees, which allowed remote sensing observations of the Arctic region, and conduct more medical and physiological experiments than those currently feasible on the Russian Orbital Segment of the ISS. Since December 2025, this has now changed back to a 51.6-degree orbit after it was decided to be built from the ISS instead, which it will later share the same orbital plane as India's own Bharatiya Antariksh Station (BAS) by 2040.

== Assembly ==
ROS is envisioned to include up to seven modules, with 2035 being the targeted completion deadline. The first phase of construction will consist of four modules: Nauka, Universal Node Module (UUM), Science Power Module (NEM), and the gateway airlock module. Nauka, launched and docked to the ISS in 2021, will be repurposed as a core ROS module. NEM, initially intended to be launched to the ISS in 2024, will be refitted on the ground to prepare the module for its new role as part of ROS. A base module, build from an upgraded second NEM, was included in previous plans in place of Nauka and is still expected to be added to the station at some point. The second phase will include two "target" modules for logistics and research. A commercial module for up to four space tourists was under consideration in previous plans.

Internal RKK Energia documents obtained by Scientific American in December 2025 laid out the following timeline:

- 2028 – Prichal is undocked from Nauka and deorbited.
- Late 2028 – UUM is launched on a Soyuz-2.1b from Baikonur and docked to Nauka in Prichal's place.
- 2029 – NEM is launched on a Proton-M from Baikonur and docked to UUM's lower port.
- 2030 – Gateway/Airlock Module (ShM) is launched on a Soyuz-2.1b from Baikonur and docked to UUM's side port.

The core ROS modules–Nauka, UUM, NEM, and ShM—would separate from the ISS at this point and operate as an independent space station, using specially modified Progress spacecraft for station-keeping.

The NEM-derived base module is expected to be launched on an Angara A5M from Vostochny. The two "target" modules are expected to be launched by 2033, also on the Angara A5M. The full assembly plan for ROS was publicly presented by Roscosmos and RKK Energia on 8 April 2026.

== Planned extravehicular components ==
There are plans for "multiple robotic systems on the exterior of the outpost to help with assembly and maintenance work". The station is also planned to control "a family of small spacecraft" (satellites) to be launched directly from the station and "circl[ing] the globe in its vicinity", which would be a space first. A dedicated spaceplane was also proposed for their in-orbit maintenance.

== Planned mode of operation ==
In contrast to the continuously crewed ISS, ROS will be visited by cosmonaut crews periodically, operating in automatic mode most of the time. During their stays, cosmonauts will install new components, check scientific equipment, conduct experiments and perform maintenance and repair tasks. Roscosmos cites not only financial, but also safety reasons for this, "as it reduces the risk of cosmonauts receiving dangerous radiation doses".

== Lunar expeditionary station ==
On 8 April 2026, a proposed extension of the ROS program included the development of an "Expeditionary Module-Station" intended to serve as a base for future deep-space and lunar missions. Derived from the Science Power Module (NEM) and the next-generation Orel spacecraft, this approximately 22-tonne module is designed to accommodate a crew of two to four personnel and features a heavily shielded radiation shelter.

The module will be launched by an Angara-A5M rocket and initially dock with the ROS in low Earth orbit for flight testing and systems verification. Upon successful completion of these trials, the expeditionary module will detach from the ROS and rendezvous with a heavy space tug, which will then propel the module from Earth orbit to the Moon. Once established in lunar orbit, the module will operate autonomously as an independent, human-tended lunar space station designed for periodic crew visits, either as a standalone station or as part of an international cislunar station.

== See also ==
- List of space stations
