= Mini-Research Module =

A Mini-Research Module (MRM; Russian: Малый исследовательский модуль, МИМ, MIM) is one of the two pressurised modules of the Russian Orbital Segment of the International Space Station. They are the following:

- Poisk (MRM-2)
- Rassvet (MRM-1)

== See also ==
- Research station
