= SSVP docking system =

Joining mechanism on the ISS Russian Orbital Segment and visiting spacecraft

Sistema Stykovki i Vnutrennego Perekhoda, SSVP (Russian: Система стыковки и внутреннего перехода, System for docking and internal transfer) is a docking standard used by Soviet and Russian spacecraft, sometimes called RDS for Russian Docking System. It has been used on all variants of Soyuz other than the Soyuz 7K-L3 and early flights of the Soyuz 7K-OK, as well as Progress, TKS, ATV, and on all Soviet and Russian space stations.

== History ==
SSVP was initially conceived in 1967 by the TsKBEM design bureau for use on the then-planned OIS military space station. Though OIS never flew, in 1970 the design was selected for use on the Salyut and Almaz space stations. During its first attempted use on the Soyuz 10 mission, docking was unsuccessful due to a faulty hatch, and a failure in the automatic docking system. This led to a number of redesigns to reduce damage from accidental loads.

In the 1980s, SSVP was further upgraded to support docking of large modules, such as the ones that would be used to construct Mir. They were used to attach all pressurized modules of the Mir, and for most spacecraft dockings (with the exception of the Space Shuttle flights, and Soyuz TM-16, which used the APAS-89 docking mechanisms located on Kristall and the Mir Docking Module.)

The modern version of SSVP is SSVP-G4000. The Russian segment of the International Space Station features eight available passive SSVP-G4000 ports, located on Zvezda-aft, Rassvet, Poisk, and Prichal. An additional port, on Zarya-nadir, was used to dock Rassvet. In addition to Russian spacecraft, the SSVP was also used on the European Automated Transfer Vehicle, which docked to the aft port of Zvezda. These ports were provided by Russia in exchange for the Data Management System, supplied by ESA for use in Zvezda.

An upgraded version, designed for reusability and to provide a wider tunnel, is planned for use on the next-generation Orel spacecraft.

== Design ==
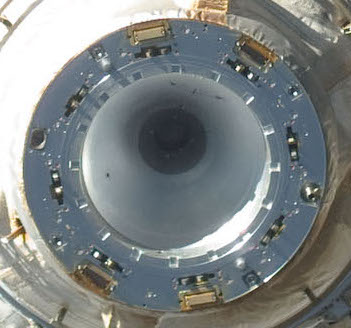
SSVP Drogue

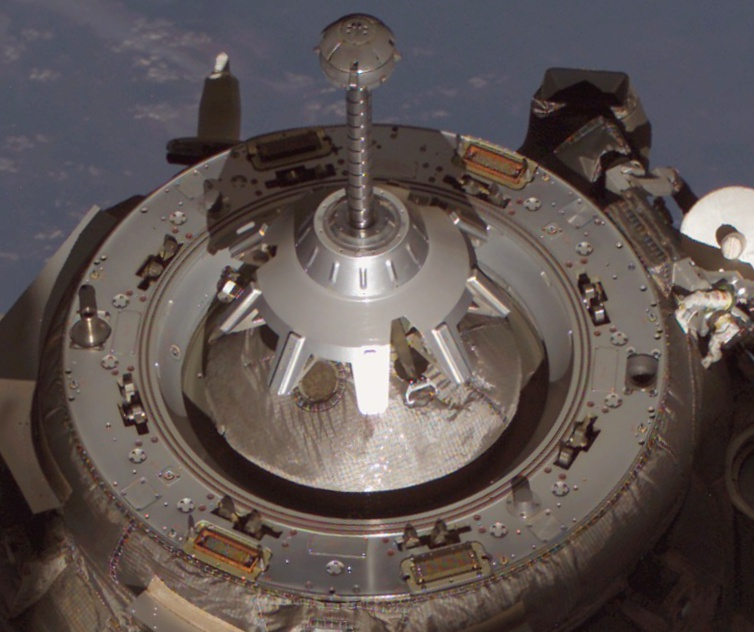
SSVP Probe

SSVP consists of two components; an active probe, and a passive drogue. The probe enters the drogue, and its tip is grasped by soft-capture latches which are then retracted using electrically driven motors to provide close alignment. Eight hard-capture locks then firmly attach the two spacecraft. After hard docking, the pressure between spacecraft is equalized using the Interface Leak Check System.

The port contains a transfer tunnel, with an internal diameter of 800 mm (31.5 in). The ring surrounding this tunnel also includes a number of connectors, providing for transfer of power, data, and fuel between two docked vehicles.

== Hybrids ==
A "hybrid" version, combining the design of SSVP and APAS-95, is also available, used for permanent docking of space station modules. This version uses the probe-and-drogue design of the standard SSVP, but with a hard-dock collar from APAS-95. The APAS-95 collar has twelve latches instead of the eight of standard SSVP. This variant is known as SSVP-M8000.

These hybrid SSVP ports are used to permanently connect Pirs, Nauka, Poisk and Zarya to Zvezda and Prichal to Nauka.

Modified Passive hybrids of SSVP-M8000 are used on lateral ports of Prichal and are known as SSPA-GB 1/2.

== Adapter Ring ==
It converts passive Hybrid SSVP-M8000 Docking System to passive SSVP-G4000. The docking ring initially used for Soyuz MS-18 and Progress MS-17 docking on Nauka until detached by Progress MS-17 inflight for Prichal module arrived on ISS. This adapter is termed as SSPA-GM. It was made for the Nauka nadir and Prichal nadir ports of the International Space Station, where Soyuz and Progress spacecraft had to dock to a port designated for modules. Before removal of SSPA-GM, the docking ring is 80 cm (31 in) in diameter; that becomes 120 cm (47 in) after removal.

== See also ==
- Docking and berthing of spacecraft
- International Docking System Standard
