= Prichal (ISS module) =

International Space Station (ISS) module

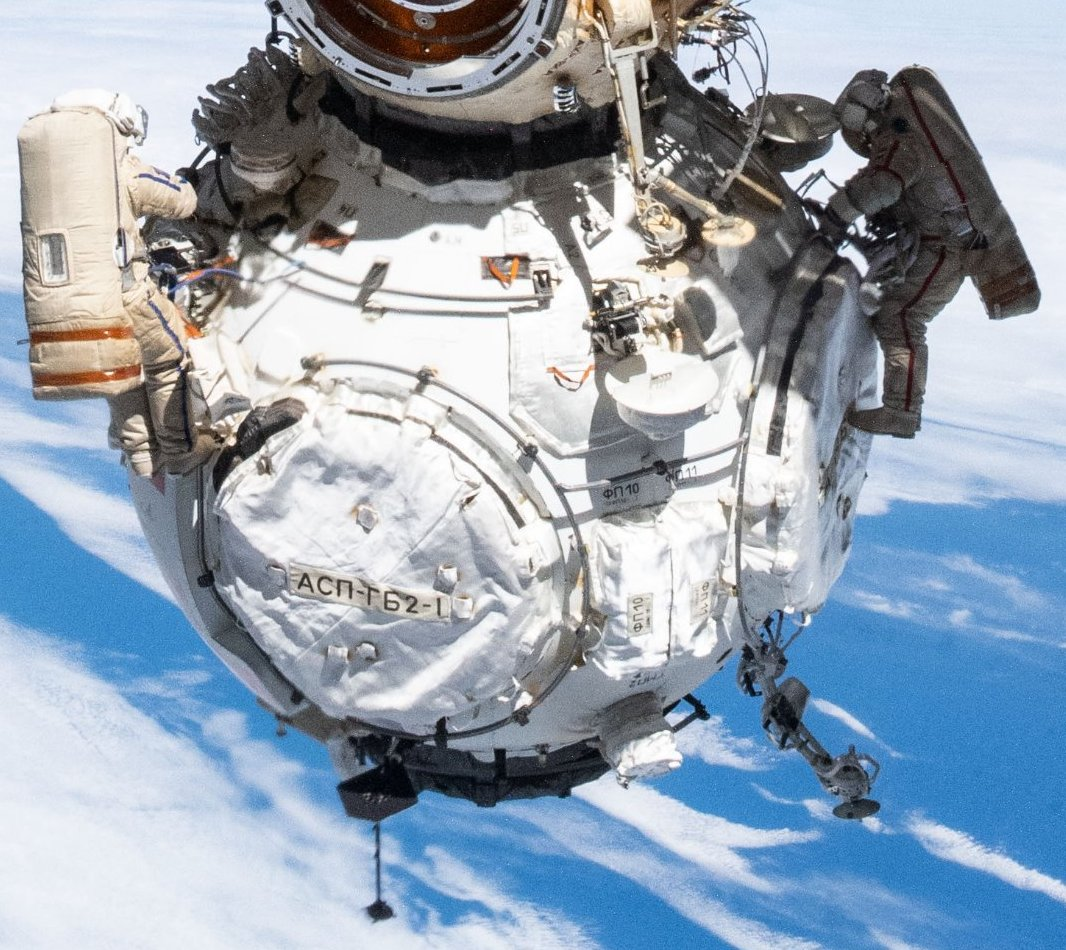
- Prichal as seen during a spacewalk from the Cupola, during January 2022.

Module statistics
- Part of: International Space Station
- Launch date: 24 November 2021, 13:06:35 UTC
- Launch vehicle: Soyuz-2.1b / Progress M-UM
- Berthed: 26 November 2021, 15:20:06 UTC (Nauka nadir)
- Mass: 3,890 kg (8,580 lb)
- Length: 4.91 m (16.1 ft)
- Diameter: 3.3 m (11 ft)
- Pressurised volume: 19 m^{3} (670 cu ft)

Configuration
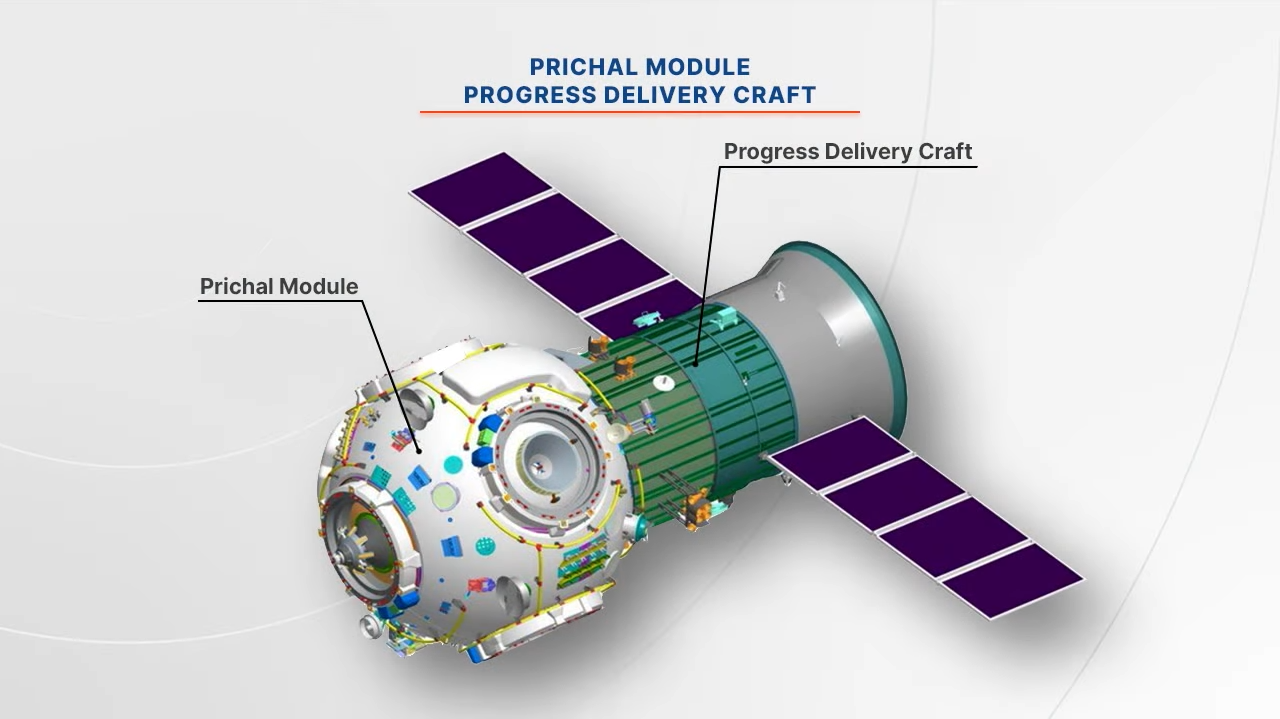
- Diagram of Prichal's exterior from front, while being attached to Progress M-UM.

External image
- Prichal module / Progress M-UM launch mission logo

Prichal (Russian: Причал, lit. 'pier'), also known as the Uzlovoy Module (UM, Russian: узловой модуль, romanized: Uzlovoy Modul, lit. 'Node Module') is a Russian-built component of the International Space Station (ISS). This spherical module has six docking ports (forward, aft, port, starboard, zenith, and nadir) to provide additional docking ports for Soyuz and Progress spacecraft, as well as potential future modules.

Prichal was launched on 24 November 2021, at 13:06:35 UTC, atop a Soyuz-2.1b rocket and guided automously into the nadir port of the Nauka module by a Progress M-UM spacecraft modified into a space tug and attached to the Prichal's nadir port. Once in place, the Progress spacecraft disconnected for a destructive reentry. As of 2024, the forward, aft, port and starboard docking ports remain covered.

Prichal was initially intended to be an element of the now canceled Orbital Piloted Assembly and Experiment Complex (OPSEK). As of December 2025, plans for the future Russian Orbital Station (ROS) state that Prichal will be deorbited and replaced by a new Universal Node module in 2028.

== Description ==
Prichal is a nodal module that has a pressurized spherical ball-shaped design with six hybrid docking ports. It also has functional components located outside and inside it. The interior of the module is divided into two zones: habitable and instrument with on-board systems. The zenith port out of the six ports is active SSVP-M to allow docking with the space station, while the four ports are passive hybrids of SSVP-M called SSPA-GB 1/2, enabling other modules to dock with the module. Lastly, the nadir port is a passive SSVP-M; but has SSPA-GM adapter fitted on it converting it into SSVP-G. This would support the automated transfer of propellants between docked Russian spacecraft and the space station in both directions and the automated docking of crewed and uncrewed spacecraft using the KURS-NA system along with docking of future modules like Prichal to Nauka after removal of the adapter. Such a design is significantly different from that of the docking modules Pirs and Poisk that have only one docking port for spacecraft each. The docking compartment has an internal volume of 19 m^{3} (670 cu ft). It also has ERA grapple fixtures for the European Robotic Arm to move about from one part of the module to other parts or to Nauka.

During development, Prichal module was called the Uzlovoy Module (UM, Russian: узловой модуль, romanized: Uzlovoy Modul', lit. 'Node Module').

== Development ==
=== Early launch targets ===
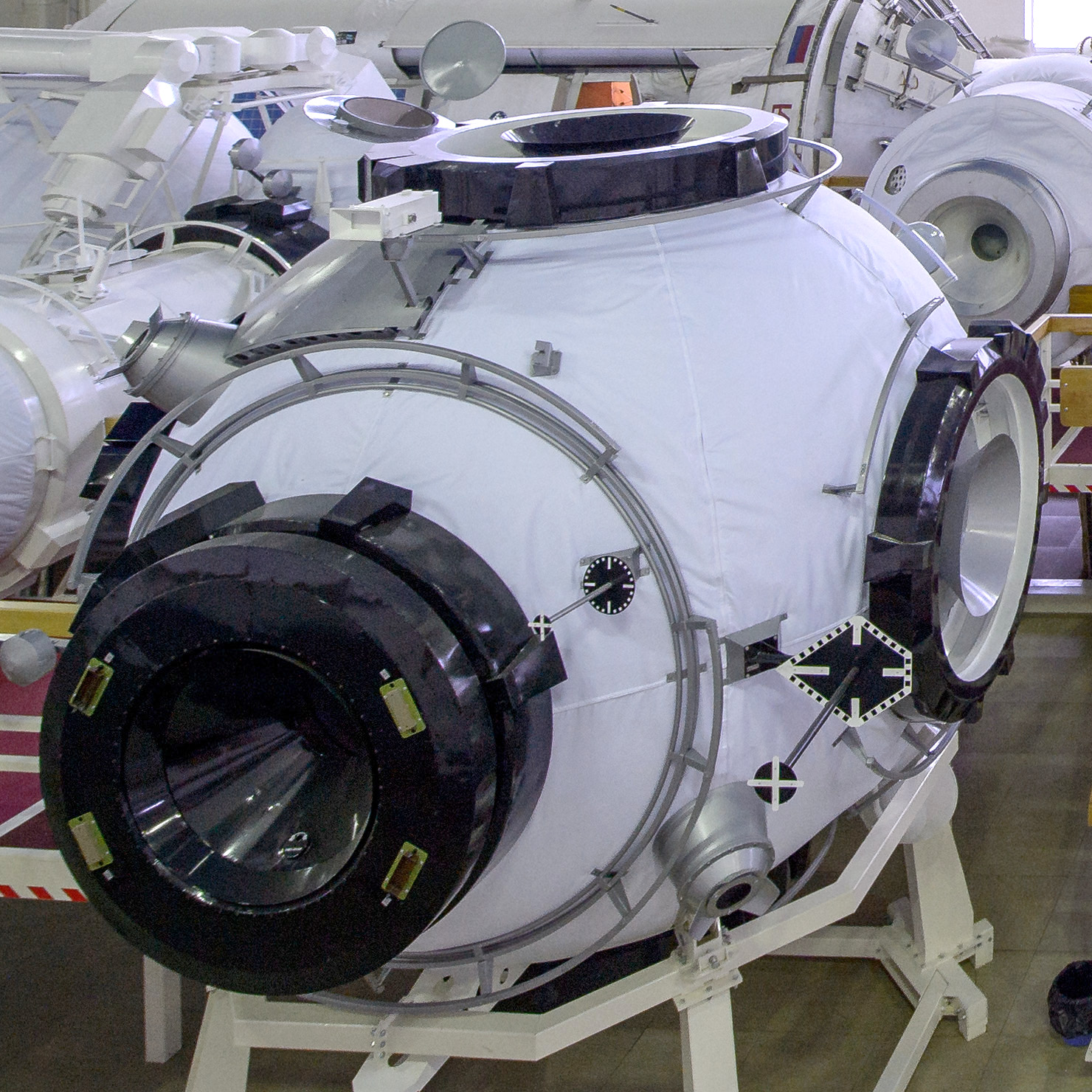
Prichal module mockup

The Orbital Piloted Assembly and Experiment Complex (OPSEK) was a proposed Russian space station intended to support deep space human exploration missions to Mars, possibly the Moon, and Saturn. It was planned to be partially constructed in orbit while attached to the ISS. Prichal, with its six docking ports, would have served as the only permanent element of OPSEK, while other modules would come and go as their life span and mission required. In September 2017, Roscosmos stated that there were "no plans to separate the Russian segment from the ISS". This ended public OPSEK plans.

=== Launch delays ===
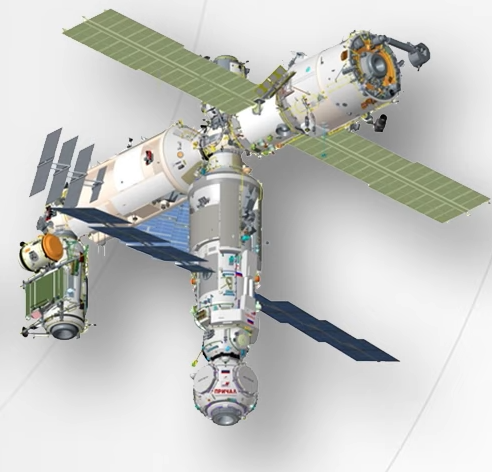
ISS Russian orbital segment after docking of UM Prichal module

In the mid-2000s, RKK Energia, the manufacturer of the Russian Orbital Segment (ROS) components, added the Uzlovoy Module (UM) to the future configuration of the ISS. The proposal involves the addition of a Nodal Module (a significant modification of the Universal Docking Module (UDM) design, increasing the number of docking ports from 4 to 6 and taking into account its location at the Nauka nadir and at the same time reducing its weight from 20 tons to 4 tons, partly by removing the additional life-support system) and adding two additional science/energy modules to the segment around 2013–2015. These plans were tabled due to Nauka delays. Since the refurbishment of the Nauka module, the Uzlovoy module is now the Prichal module. Despite its small size, this four-ton, ball-shaped module could play an extremely important role in the Russian space program.

The preliminary design was completed on 15 January 2011, when RKK Energia announced that its Scientific and Technical Council (NTS) conducted a meeting that reviewed and approved the preliminary design of the Nodal Module and associated hardware. The meeting also approved the specialized launch craft, a Progress cargo ship designated the Progress M-UM and the adaptation of the Soyuz launch vehicle for the launch of the Progress M-UM spacecraft module.

Initially, the nodal module was expected to be incorporated into the ISS in 2012, but the launch has been postponed several times because of the delays with Nauka, which had to be launched prior to Prichal. In November 2018, executive director for Manned Space Programs of Roscosmos Sergei Krikalev indicated that Prichal was ready to fly, while there were still "little problems" with Nauka.

At the control and test station of the S.P. Korolev Rocket and Space Corporation Energia (part of the Roscosmos State Corporation), technical tests of the Prichal nodal module as part of the Progress M-UM transport cargo vehicle-module were completed. On 31 July 2021, technicians sent the spacecraft to the technical complex of the Baikonur Cosmodrome to continue assembly and pre-flight preparation in accordance with the schedule for the further development of the Russian segment of the International Space Station. The RSC Energia specialists successfully completed a cycle of joint tests of the Prichal module with the integrated mock-ups for the Zvezda service module and the Nauka multipurpose laboratory module. After the final operations, the undocked components of the spacecraft and ground test equipment were prepared for shipment to the cosmodrome by rail.

=== Processing at Baikonur ===
After the successful launch of Nauka module, on 11 August 2021, Prichal arrived at Baikonur after a four-day train ride from Energia in Moscow with its service module, Progress M-UM. The module was extracted from its container and placed in the hard stand that previously held Nauka while the propulsion module was moved over to Soyuz Test Stand 2 in hall 104 at Site 254. On the same day, specialists from RKK Energia installed the module and its progress in their respective processing rigs at Site 254 and began setting up the automated test network of the processing complex. As part of the incoming inspection procedure, specialists conducted a visual inspection of the propulsion module of Progress M-UM and tested the solar panel deployment mechanism on the vehicle. Over the next few months Prichal was checked out before the module was placed in a fairing and attached to a Soyuz 2.1b launch vehicle for delivery to the station.

On 20 September 2021, Prichal was transferred to the vacuum chamber, and testing was done. During the test, Prichal was filled with compressed helium to check the hatches for leaks. Once testing was complete, the wiring was installed, and Prichal was returned to the vacuum for its pneumatic test in October 2021.

By early October 2021, Prichal had undergone tests of onboard automatic systems and the launch readiness simulation using ground diagnostics equipment. On 4 October 2021, the module was lifted from its work site and transferred to the processing rig for the Progress M-UM space tug, where it was connected to the adapter of the Progress's propulsion compartment with mechanical locks. Further integration activities included connections and tests of power, command and data interfaces between the module and the space tug.

On 11 October, specialists began powering up the module's onboard systems and bringing them to launch readiness using ground testing equipment. The module and its space tug were then lowered into a horizontal position and moved into the anechoic zone, where tests of the spacecraft's KURS-NA radio system began on 20 October. On 28 October, Roscosmos announced that vacuum tests had been successfully completed.

On 12 October, the Soyuz 2.1b booster was assembled and moved to the erecting hall in perpetration for mating with Prichal and its service module.

On 5 November, specialists conducted tests of solar panels aboard the Progress space tug by exposing them to an array of electric lights. At the same time, the preparation of cargo items slated for delivery to the station aboard Prichal was in the final stages, according to Roscosmos. These operations included loading of around 700 kg (1,500 lb) of cargo inside Prichal for the Expedition 66 crew aboard the station, including food, personal protective equipment, water filters, repair hardware, hygiene and medical supplies.

On 10 November, a meeting of technical management in Baikonur cleared the Progress M-UM space tug with the Prichal module for irreversible operations, including fueling and loading of pressurized gases to the composite spacecraft.

On 12 November, Roscosmos announced that a three-day process of pneumatic testing on all boosters comprising the Soyuz-2.1b launch vehicle for the Prichal mission had been completed. By that time, specialists were setting up another round of tests, checking onboard systems for monitoring propellant loading levels and conducting autonomous tests of the measurement system.

By 13 November, fueling operations for Prichal were completed and it was returned to the spacecraft processing building at Site 254. Later on that day, thermal protection blankets were added to the propulsion compartment and to all the ports, except the nadir and zenith port, of Prichal module.

The following day, the spacecraft was integrated with its launch vehicle adapter, which served as an interface for the payload fairing and provided connections from the command system aboard the Progress M-UM space tug and the Prichal module to the flight control system of the Soyuz 2.1b launch vehicle. After the docking of the components, specialists conducted test activations of the onboard radio complex and other service systems, Roskosmos said. On the same day, the resulting stack was transferred to Hall 102 inside the spacecraft processing building at Site 254 for installation of the protective fairing, which was performed on 16 November, thus completing the assembly of the payload section. After installation and mechanical fixation of both fairing halves, the electrical circuits of the fairing separation system were checked.

On 18 November, it was transported to the launch vehicle assembly building at Site 31 for integration with the Soyuz-2.1b launch vehicle, which was completed by 19 November. The rollout of the vehicle to the launch pad at Site 31 started at 00:30 UTC on 21 November 2021.

Following the arrival at the pad, the vehicle was erected into a vertical position, and specialists began preparation for tests of the launch vehicle and the spacecraft. Integrated tests of the launch vehicle were conducted in the second half of the day on 22 November 2021 and were successfully completed with the simulation of the flight from launch until the separation of the payload. On 23 November 2021, considered a backup day in the on-pad processing, specialists conducted checks of propellant lines in preparation for fueling of the launch vehicle. The meeting of the State Commission, overseeing the preparations for launch, was scheduled at 09:00 UTC (10:00 Baikonur time), clearing the launch vehicle for fueling and launch.

== Launch ==
Prichal was launched on 24 November 2021 on the Progress M-UM spacecraft, a modified Progress spacecraft which was used to deliver it to the space station. A Soyuz-2.1b launch vehicle was used to place it into orbit. Due to the larger diameter of the Prichal module, the Progress M-UM was launched in a 4.1 m (13 ft) wide ST-type fairing.

== Transit phase and docking ==
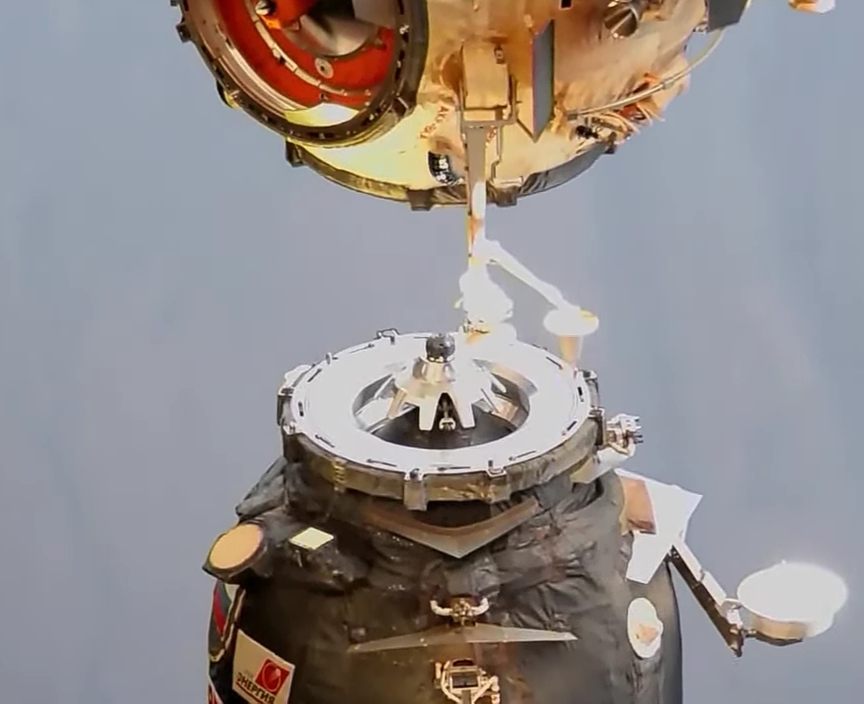
Progress MS-17 undocking and Nauka nadir temporary docking adapter removal (Note: The temporary docking adapter is the grey ring surrounding the docking probe of Progress MS-17.) (Note: The port had the temporary docking adapter before the SSVP-M or "Hybrid" standard, consisting of the traditional SSVP-G probe‑and‑drogue soft-dock mechanism and an APAS-95 hard-dock collar before Prichal arrival.)

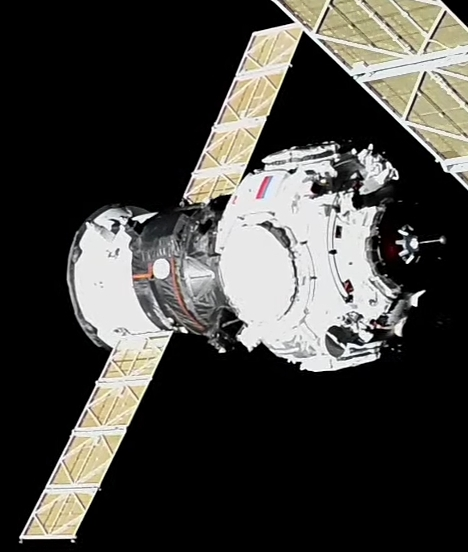
Prichal module docking to Nauka module.

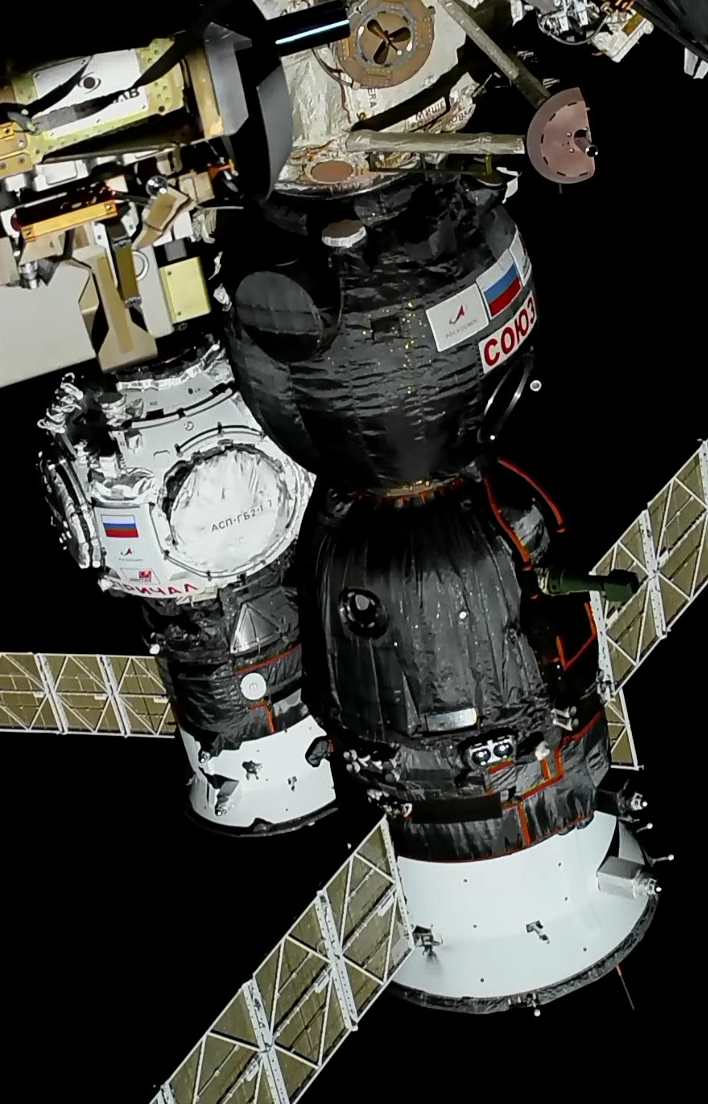
Prichal module docked to Nauka module.

The nodal module was docked to the re-configured nadir, or Earth-facing port, of the Nauka module after removal of the module's nadir docking adapter by Progress MS-17, which departed on 25 November 2021. Prichal, the second module after Rassvet to use a port initially used by Soyuz or Progress, is not able to dock to SSVP-G port, unlike the Rassvet module. So the port was reconfigured by Progress MS-17 before Prichal's docking.

Upon completion of the joint tightness checks, the Russian crew members opened the transfer hatches and carried out the final operations to dismantle the docking mechanism, transfer the Progress power supply system to the unified station power supply, and mothball the cargo ship on 27 November 2021.

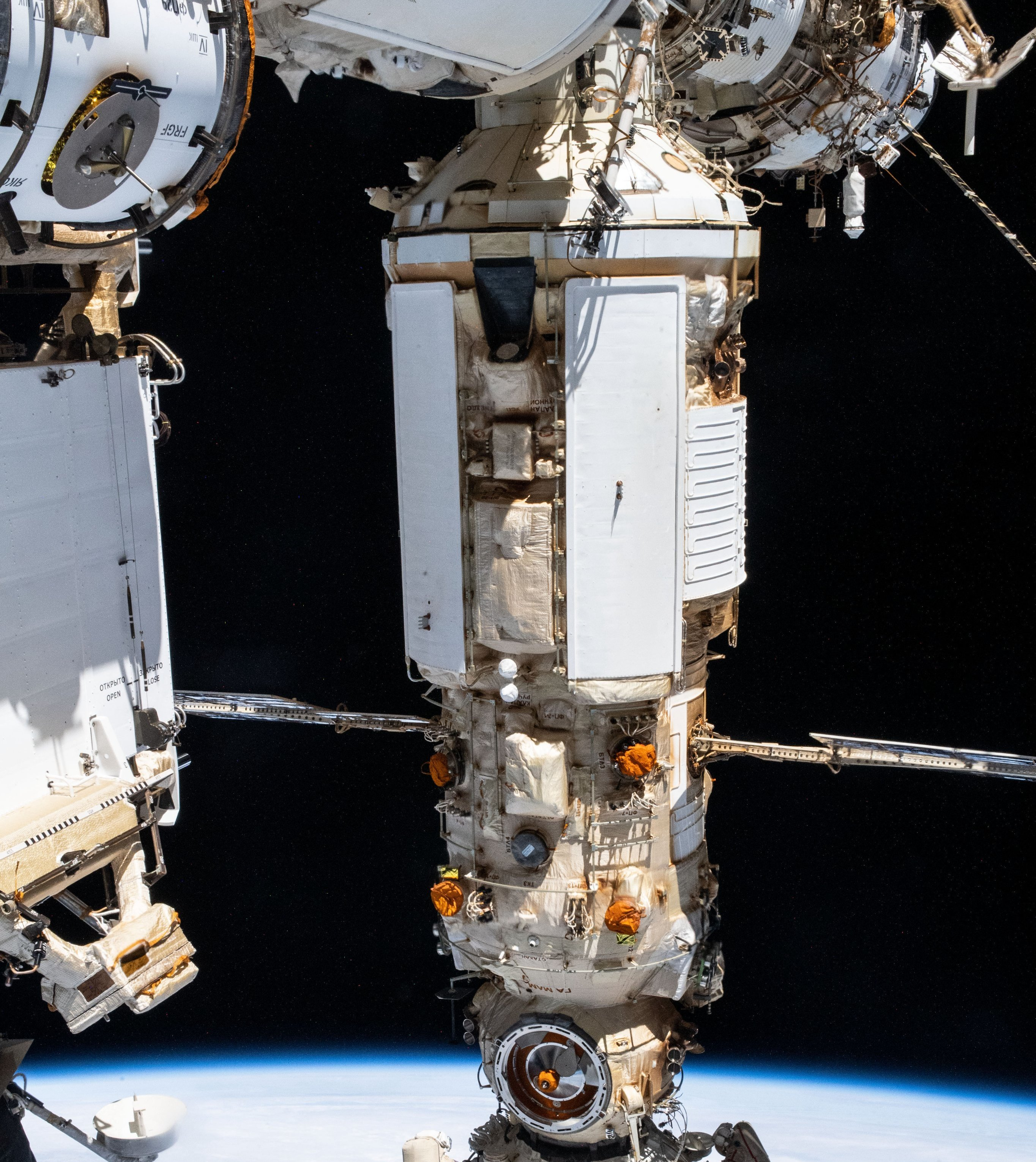
Forward view of Nauka and Prichal from the Cupola, during the Russian VKD-51 spacewalk in January 2022.

To complete the integration of Prichal into the Russian segment, cosmonauts Anton Shkaplerov and Pyotr Dubrov performed a spacewalk to install cables between Nauka and Prichal on 19 January 2022.

== Usage on the International Space Station ==
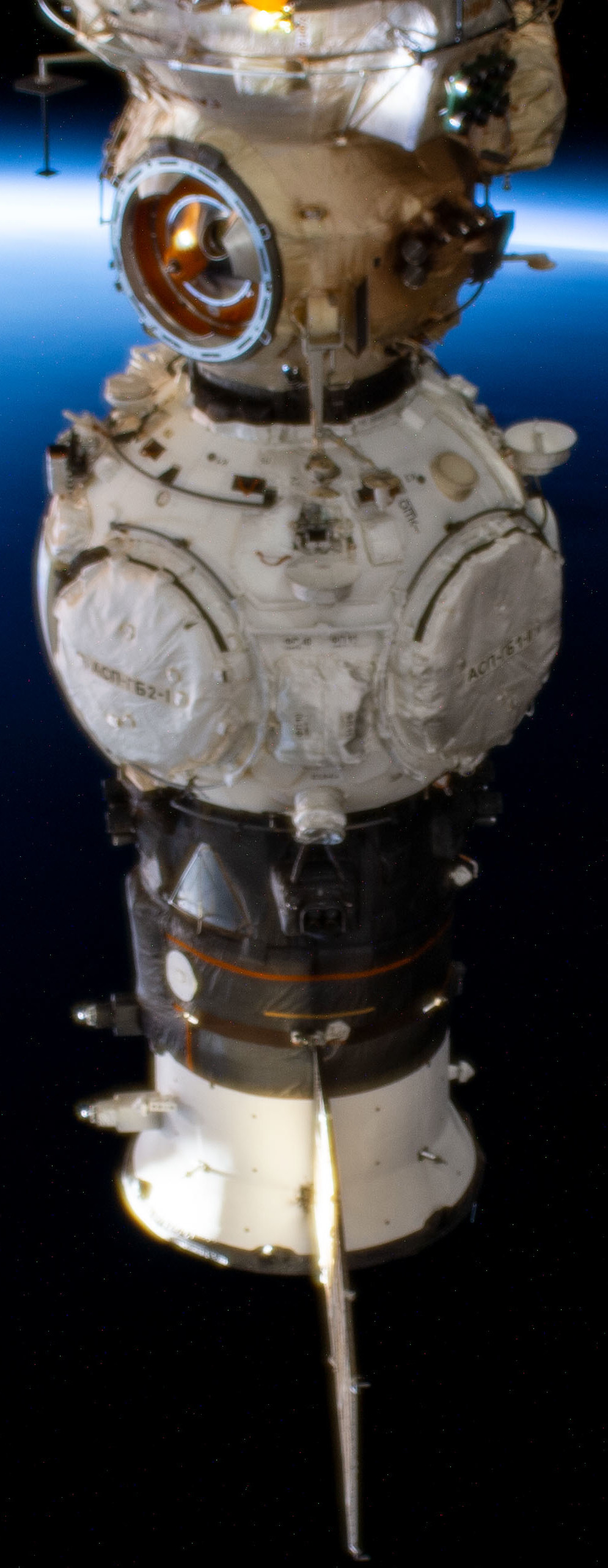
The Prichal docking module above Africa

Prichal is docked to the Nauka module, launched on 21 July 2021. Nauka has attached to the nadir port of the Zvezda module, replacing the Pirs docking module, and Prichal is docked to the nadir port of Nauka. Such a placement creates enough separation from the Zvezda and Zarya ISS modules for the other five docking ports to be used freely by Soyuz and Progress spacecraft and for other modules, SPM-1 in particular. Like the Mir Core Module the Prichal module hosts the grapple fixtures for the relocation of future modules docked to it from one port to another, using the Lyappa arm attached to those modules. It is planned that the two larger modules, nominally referred to as NEM 1 and 2, would be lifted to orbit via Angara A5 launchers in mid-2020s and would be attached to the port and starboard sides of the Prichal module, leaving its aft docking port accessible for possible future expandability or using it for commercial vehicles like Crew Dragon via an International Docking Adapter attached on top of this port and its nadir port as said, accessible for docking by Soyuz or Progress spacecraft. Because of the proximity of the Nodal Module to the planned attachment point of MRM-1 on the nadir docking port of Zarya FGB to facilitate docking of Soyuz and Progress spacecraft, the module's forward-facing port will be unusable.

The Russian Orbital Station is planned to be a new space station inheriting Nauka from the Russian Orbital Segment of the ISS. In this case, Prichal will be replaced in 2028 by a near-identical Universal Node module constructed for the new station.

=== Multi-docking compartment ===
It is standard practice to dock Soyuz vehicles to the nadir ports of Rassvet and Prichal and dock Progress to the aft port of Zvezda and the zenith port of Poisk. This is because the transfer chamber which connects to Zvezda's aft port has a small leak which requires the hatches to remain closed as much as possible, which would block access to a Soyuz if it were docked to Zvezda's aft port. In addition, Progress crafts are preferred for the aft port as this enables them to perform ISS reboosts using their main engines. Progress crafts are also preferred for the Poisk zenith port as Poisk is now serving as the Russian Segment's EVA airlock following the departure of Pirs, and access to Soyuz craft docked to Poisk is blocked while Poisk is depressurized during spacewalks, which presents safety issues in an ISS evacuation scenario.

== Dockings ==
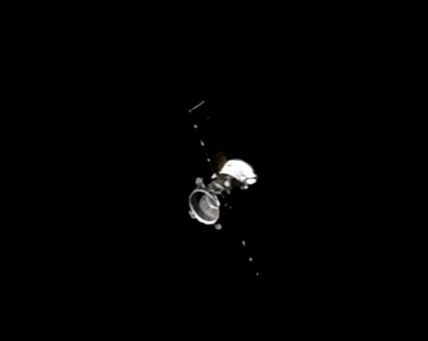
Progress M-UM propulsion section seen in space.

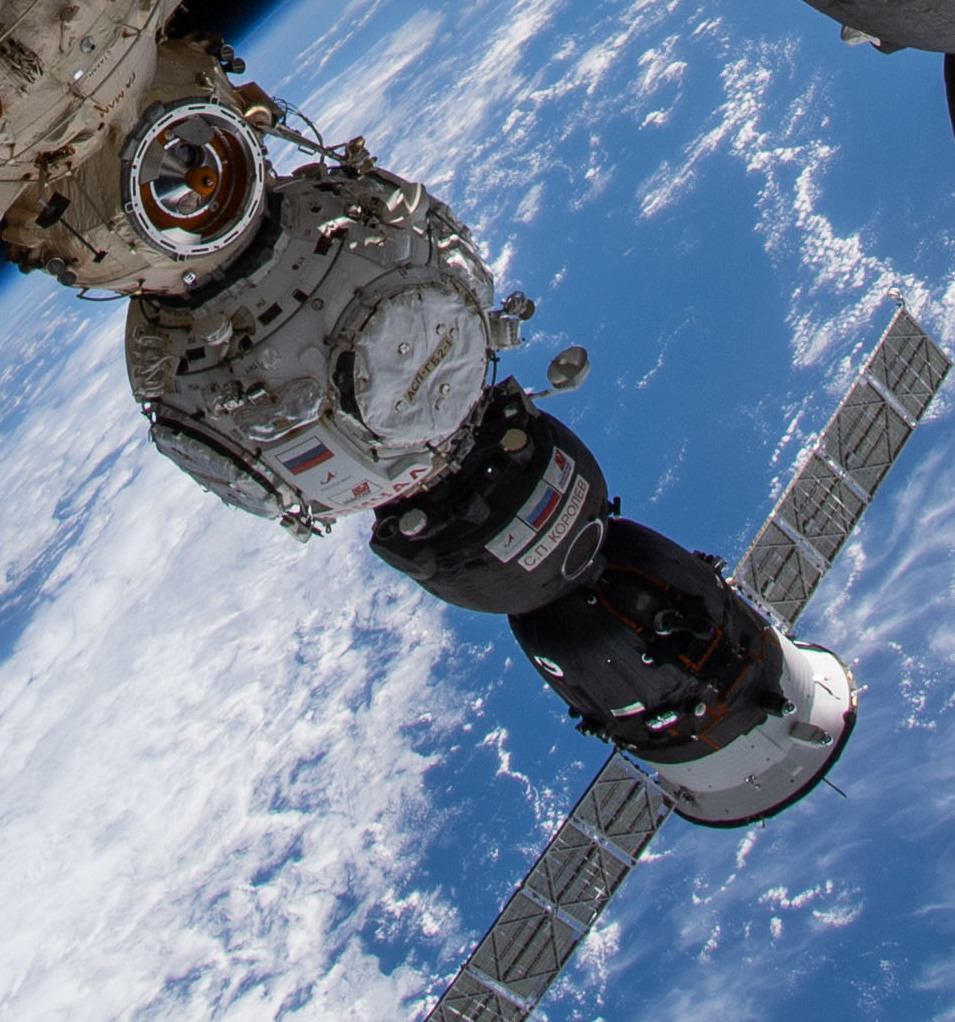
Soyuz MS-21 docked to Prichal

All spacecraft that have docked with Prichal have launched from Baikonur Cosmodrome.

Spacecraft	Launch (UTC)	Launch vehicle	Launch pad	Docking	Undocking	Deorbit	Remarks
Zenith
Nauka	21 July 2021; 14:58:25	Proton-M	Site 200/39	26 November 2021; 15:20:06	—N/a		ISS-3R
Nadir
Progress M-UM	24 November 2021; 13:06:35	Soyuz-2.1b	Site 31/6	—N/a	22 December 2021; 23:03	23 December 2021; 04:30:54	ISS-6R. Modified Progress-M spacecraft used as a tug to deliver Prichal to the ISS.
Soyuz MS-21	18 March 2022; 15:55:18	Soyuz-2.1a	Site 31/6	18 March 2022; 19:12:06	29 September 2022; 07:34:20	29 September 2022; 10:57:12	ISS-67S delivering Expedition 66 crew.
Soyuz MS-23	24 February 2023; 00:24	Soyuz 2.1a	Site 31/6	6 April 2023; 09:22	27 September 2023; 07:54:21	27 September 2023; 11:17	ISS-69s. Had been docked to Poisk since 26 February 2023 after launching unmanned to serve as a rescue capsule for the crew of Soyuz MS-22.
Soyuz MS-25	23 March 2024; 12:36:10	Soyuz 2.1a	Site 31/6	25 March 2024; 15:02:51	23 September 2024; 08:36:30	23 September 2024; 11:59:04	ISS-71S delivering Expedition 70 crew. Two visiting crew members returned on Soyuz MS-24.
Soyuz MS-27	8 April 2025; 05:47:15	Soyuz 2.1a	Site 31/6	8 April 2025; 08:57:43	9 December 2025; 01:41:30	9 December 2025; 05:03:33	ISS-73S delivering Expedition 72 crew.
Soyuz MS-29	14 July 2026; 14:47:43	Soyuz 2.1a	Site 31/6	14 July 2026; 17:52	Planned for April 2027		ISS-75S delivering Expedition 74 crew.

== See also ==
- Orbital Piloted Assembly and Experiment Complex - proposed complex (scrapped in September 2017)
- Universal Docking Module - the original proposal that eventually became Prichal
