= Docking Compartment =

A docking compartment is a module of a space station to which visiting spacecraft can dock. Docking Compartment may refer to:

- Docking Compartment 1 (Pirs)
- Docking Compartment 2 (Poisk)

== See also ==
- Mini-Research Modules
- Mir Docking Module
