= Orbital Piloted Assembly and Experiment Complex =

Proposed Russian space station

- Computer-generated depiction of OPSEK

Station statistics
- Crew: 2 or more
- Launch: Abandoned in 2017
- Launch pad: Baikonur Cosmodrome
- Mass: Over 100,000 kg when complete
- Atmospheric pressure: 1 atm
- Periapsis altitude: 370 to 450 km (planned)
- Apoapsis altitude: 370 to 450 km
- Orbital inclination: 70.0°
- Typical orbit altitude: 370 to 450 km

The Orbital Piloted Assembly and Experiment Complex (Russian: Орбитальный Пилотируемый Сборочно-Экспериментальный Комплекс, Orbital'nyj Pilotirujemyj Sborochno-Eksperimental'nyj Kompleks; ОПСЭК, OPSEK) was a 2009–2017 proposed third-generation Russian modular space station for low Earth orbit. The concept was to use OPSEK to assemble components of crewed interplanetary spacecraft destined for the Moon, Mars, and possibly Saturn. The returning crew could also recover on the station before landing on Earth. Thus, OPSEK could form part of a future network of stations supporting crewed exploration of the Solar System.

In early plans, the station was to consist initially of several modules from the Russian Orbital Segment (ROS) of the International Space Station (ISS). However, after studying the feasibility of this, the head of Roscosmos stated in September 2017 the intention to continue working together on the ISS. In April 2021, Roscosmos officials announced plans to exit from the ISS programme after 2024, stating concerns about the condition of its aging modules. The OPSEK concept had by then evolved into plans for the Russian Orbital Service Station (ROSS), which would be built without modules from the ISS, and was anticipated to be launched starting in the mid-2020s.

== Overview ==
Anticipating the decommissioning of the International Space Station (ISS) in the late 2020s, the Russian Federal Space Agency (Roscosmos) developed a concept in 2009 to construct a successor station in low Earth orbit.

The 2009 concept considered re-using several ISS modules to form the initial parts of a new station, which were to be subsequently replaced by new modules. On 17 June 2009, Roscosmos officially informed its ISS partner NASA about its intention to "build and prepare for operation the first elements of the orbital assembly and experimental piloted space complex by the end of the ISS life cycle". However, in September 2017, head of Roscosmos Igor Komarov said that the technical feasibility of separating the ROS to form OPSEK had been studied and there were now "no plans to separate the Russian segment from the ISS... We keep the same position, that we should work on the ISS together with our partners". The OPSEK concept evolved into the planned Russian Orbital Service Station (ROSS), which was to be composed entirely of new purpose-built modules.

According to the Russian crewed spaceflight contractor RKK Energia, the proposed station would have needed to perform the following tasks:

- Large spacecraft assembly
- Flight tests and launches
- Creating, servicing and completing inter-orbital tugs
- Providing medical and biological conditions required for the rehabilitation of interplanetary expedition crews after their return to Earth orbit.

== Structure ==
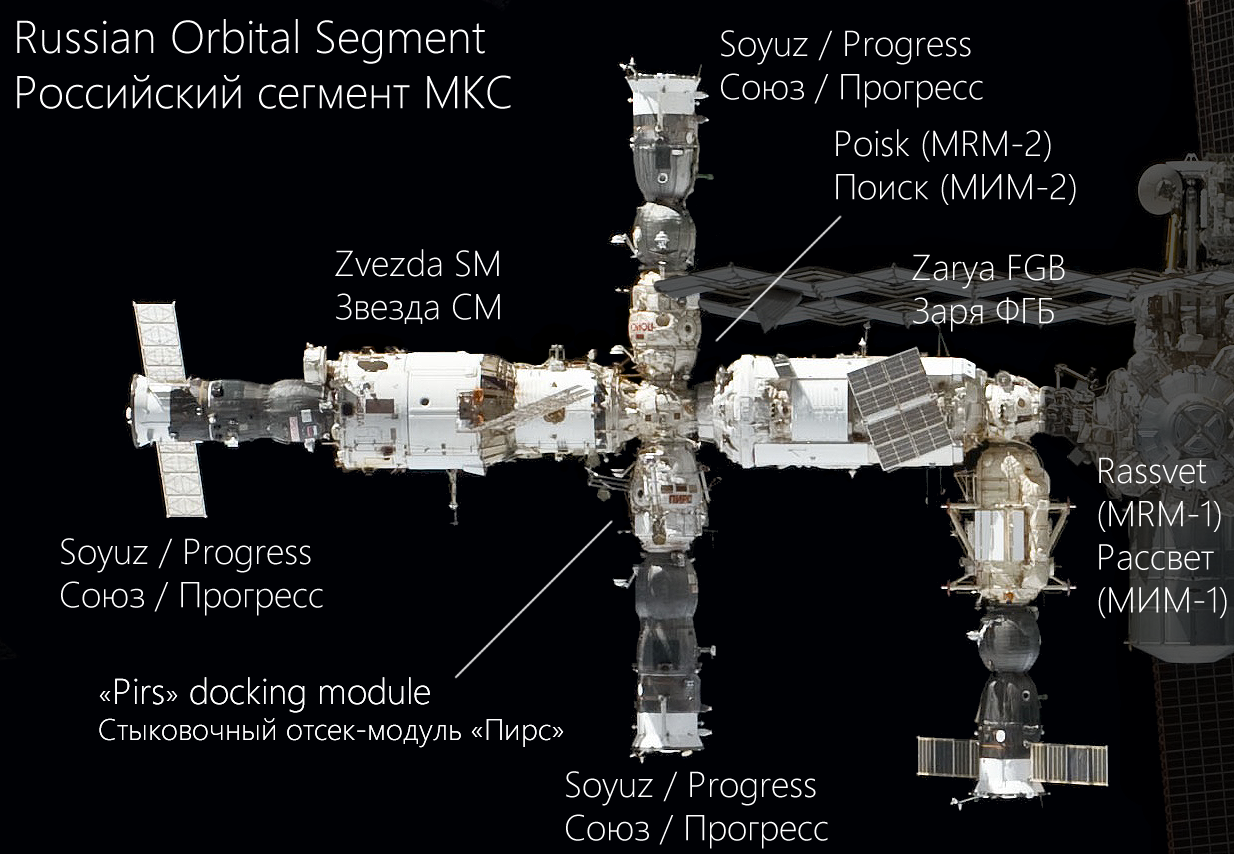
Annotated image of the International Space Station's Russian Orbital Segment configuration, 2011

OPSEK was to have followed the Salyut and Almaz series, Kosmos 557, and Mir as the 12th Russian space station launched. It was planned as a third-generation modular space station. Modular stations can allow the mission to be changed over time, and new modules can be added or removed from the existing structure, allowing greater flexibility.

Examples of other modular stations include the former Soviet/Russian Mir, the ISS, and the Chinese Tiangong space station. The first space station, Salyut 1, and other one-piece or "monolithic" first generation space stations, such as Salyut 2, 3, 4, 5, DOS-2, Kosmos 557, Almaz, and NASA's Skylab station, were not designed for re-supply. Generally, each crew had to depart the station to free the only docking port for the next crew to arrive. Skylab had more than one docking port but was not designed for resupply. Salyut 6 and 7 had more than one docking port and were designed to be resupplied routinely during crewed operation.

== Modules ==
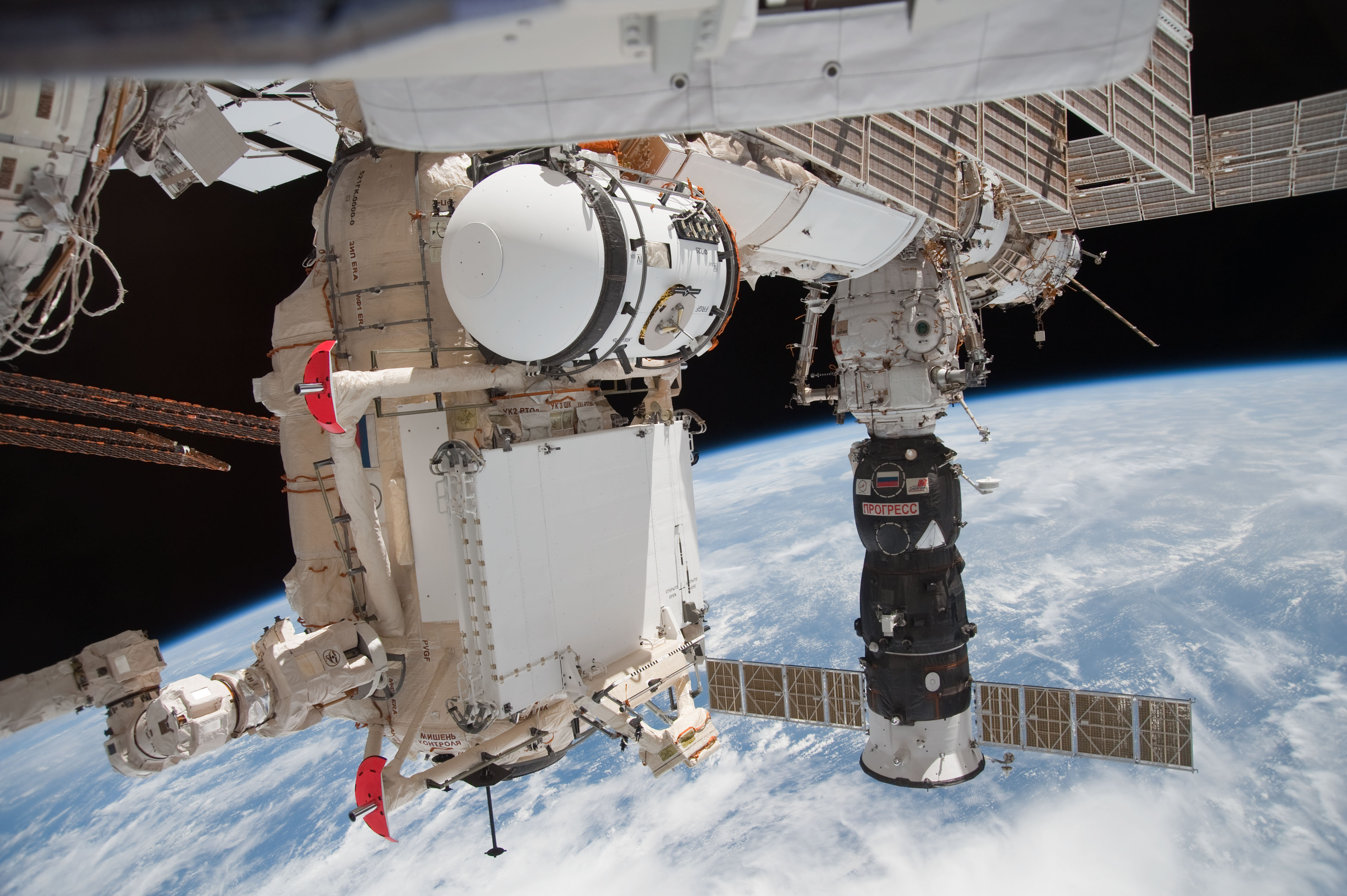
Rassvet, left of center with the Russian science airlock temporarily stored on its side.

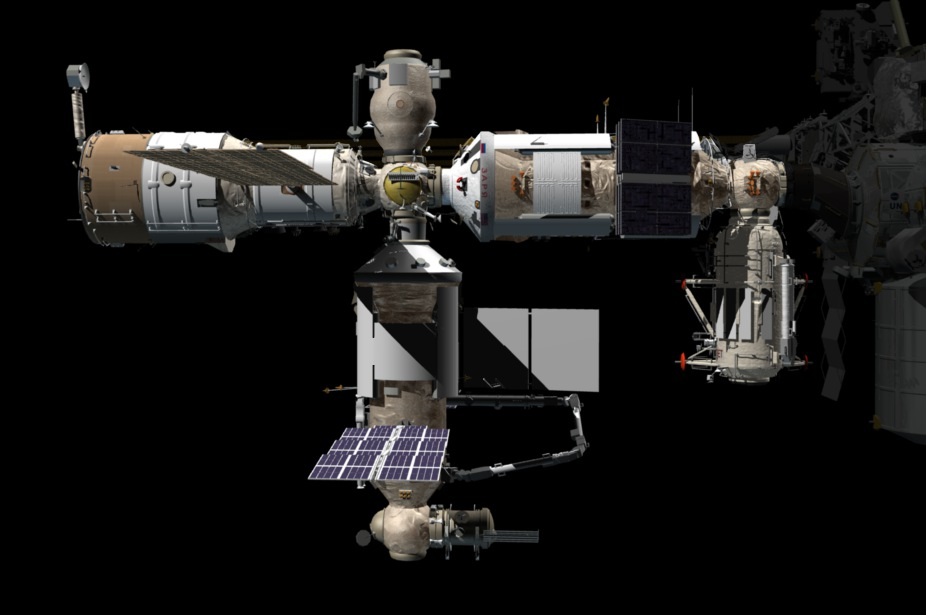
Computer generated image of the Russian Orbital Segment after Nauka docking

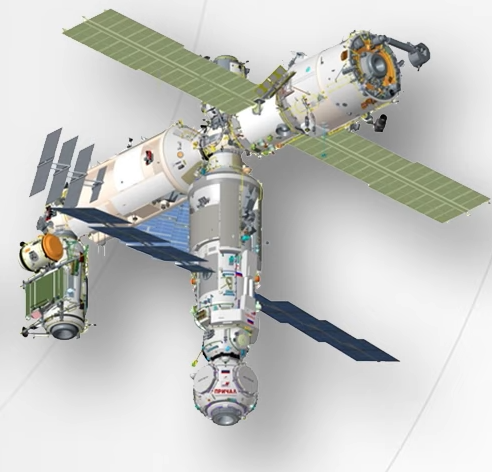
ISS Russian orbital segment after docking of UM Prichal module

OPSEK would have initially been composed of the five modules of the Russian Orbital Segment (ROS) of the ISS, separated from that station as a unit. In order of their launch dates, these modules are:

- 2000: Zvezda (DOS-8) – Providing initial life support and flight control for OPSEK.
- 2009: Poisk (Russian: По́иск; lit. Search), a.k.a. the Mini-Research Module 2 (Малый исследовательский модуль 2, MRM-2 or МИМ 2) – An airlock module for docking of Soyuz and Progress spacecraft and the automatic transfer of propellants.
- 2021: Nauka (Russian: Нау́ка; lit. "Science"), a.k.a. the Multipurpose Laboratory Module (Russian: Многофункциональный лабораторный модуль, МЛМ, MLM or FGB-2) – The major Russian laboratory module of the ISS, initially planned to be a part of OPSEK. It contains life support systems, additional orientation control, and docking ports for spacecraft and other modules. The European Robotic Arm, which services the ROS, was launched alongside the MLM.
- 2021: Prichal, a.k.a. the Node Module (Russian: Uzlovoy Module, UM, NM) – A ball-shaped docking module, conceived as the only permanent element of OPSEK. Equipped with six docking ports, the Prichal would have served as the permanent core of the station with all other modules coming and going as their life span and mission required. One port is equipped with an active hybrid docking port to enable docking with the MLM; the remaining ports are passive hybrids, enabling docking of Soyuz and Progress vehicles, heavier modules, and future spacecraft with modified docking systems. During the final stage of OPSEK assembly, it was to support two scientific and power modules. Prichal was launched in November 2021 and integrated with the ISS.
- 2022: Science and Power Module 1 (NEM-1) – Planned as the foundation of the future Russian space station, with more advanced facilities for laboratories and flight control, power generation, fuel storage, and additional living space.

ROS modules not included in the OPSEK plan include (in order of launch):

- 1998, Zarya (FGB-1) – Funded by US and owned by NASA.
- 2001, Pirs (DC-1) – Docking port which was deorbited after being replaced with Nauka.
- 2010, Rassvet (MRM-1) – Docked at Zarya as of 2012; It would presumably have to be relocated or deorbited following Russia's withdrawal from ISS.

== See also ==
- List of space stations
- International Space Station
