= Energia (corporation) =

Russian spacecraft manufacturer

S.P. Korolev Rocket and Space Corporation "Energia"
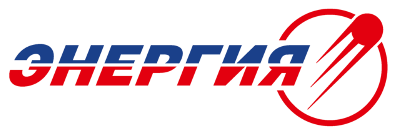

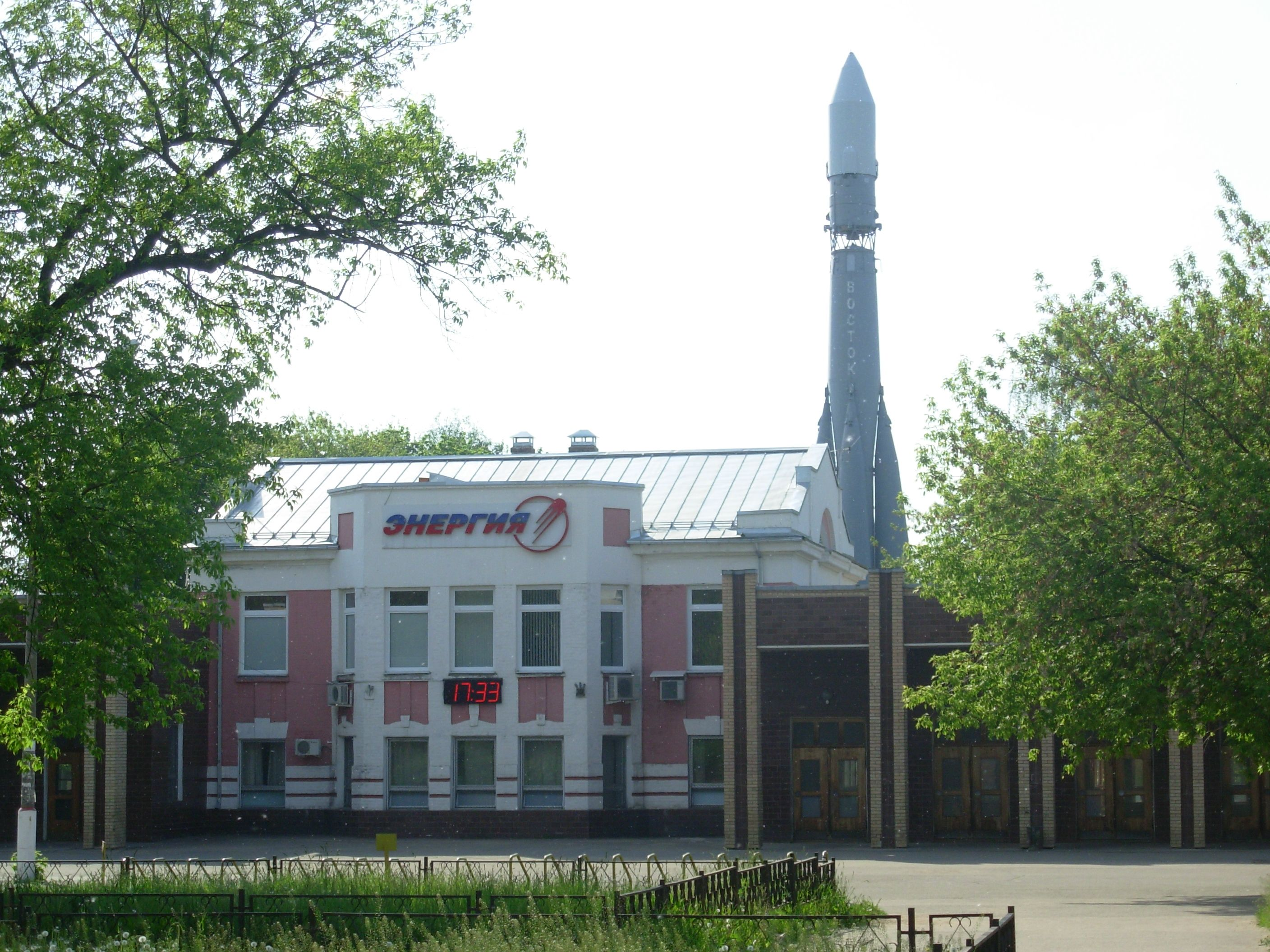
- A building with the Energia logo on it
- Native name: Ракетно-космическая корпорация «Энергия» им. С. П. Королёва
- Formerly: RSC Energia; RKK "Energiya"; NPO Energia; TsKBEM; OKB-1
- Type: Public
- Traded as: MCX: RKKE
- Industry: Aerospace, defense
- Founded: 26 August 1946; 80 years ago
- Founders: Sergei Korolev
- Headquarters: Korolyov, Russia
- Key people: Igor Maltsev (director general)
- Revenue: US$726 million (2017)
- Operating income: US$37.8 million (2017)
- Net income: US$21.1 million (2017)
- Total assets: US$1.97 billion (2017)
- Total equity: US$65.3 million (2017)
- Owner: United Rocket and Space Corporation (38.2%)
- Number of employees: 7,791 (2017)
- Website: energia.ru/english

S.P. Korolev Rocket and Space Corporation "Energia" (Russian: Ракетно-космическая корпорация «Энергия» им. С. П. Королёва, romanized: Raketno-kosmicheskaya korporatsiya «Energiya» imeni S. P. Korolyova), commonly known as RSC Energia, is a Russian aerospace manufacturer and spacecraft design bureau. Headquartered in Korolyov, Moscow Oblast, the company is the principal contractor for Russia's human spaceflight program, producing crewed and cargo spacecraft, space station modules, and satellite platforms.

Founded in 1946 as OKB-1 under Sergei Korolev, the group was responsible for pioneering achievements in the Soviet and Russian space programs, including the launch of the first artificial satellite Sputnik 1 and the first human spaceflight, Vostok 1. Over subsequent decades it developed the Soyuz spacecraft, the Progress cargo vehicle, the Energia heavy-lift launch system, and modules for the Salyut, Mir, and the International Space Station (ISS).

In the post-Soviet period the company was reorganized as RSC Energia in 1994, continuing its role as the lead contractor for Russia's crewed spaceflight activities. By the 2020s, however, the company faced mounting financial and organizational problems, culminating in 2025 when internal communications revealed severe debt, declining morale, and warnings of possible bankruptcy.

== History ==
=== Origins and early achievements ===
The company traces its origins to August 1946, when the Soviet government established Experimental Design Bureau-1 (OKB-1) in today's Korolyov, what was then called Kaliningrad, under the leadership of Sergei Korolev to develop long-range ballistic missiles. Korolev's team initially adapted German V-2 rocket technology into the R-1 and subsequently developed the R-7 Semyorka, the world's first intercontinental ballistic missile.

The R-7 became the basis for the Soviet space program. On 4 October 1957, OKB-1 launched Sputnik 1, the first artificial satellite, followed in April 1961 by Vostok 1, carrying Yuri Gagarin, the first human in space.

=== Expansion and new spacecraft ===
During the 1960s and 1970s, the bureau designed the Voskhod and Soyuz spacecraft, interplanetary probes to the Moon, Venus, and Mars, and the first Soviet space stations. The Salyut programme pioneered long-duration missions, while OKB-1 developed modules, life-support systems, and docking technology.

In 1974, the bureau was reorganized as the NPO Energia design bureau, named for both its heavy-lift rocket project and its growing role in crewed spaceflight. It was a key contractor for Mir, the first modular space station, launched in 1986.

=== Post-Soviet restructuring ===
After the dissolution of the Soviet Union, the enterprise was reorganized as the Rocket and Space Corporation Energia in 1994. Despite budget cuts in the 1990s, it remained central to Russia's human spaceflight program. Energia managed the production of Soyuz and Progress spacecraft, which became essential for sustaining crews aboard the International Space Station.

The company also cooperated internationally, including with NASA on Shuttle–Mir and later ISS operations. In 2011, Energia became a publicly traded joint-stock company under the management of Roscosmos.

=== Recent developments ===
RSC Energia continues to develop crewed spacecraft, including modernization of Soyuz and Progress vehicles, and has proposed next-generation designs such as the Orel spacecraft. It manufactures modules for the Russian Orbital Segment of the ISS, such as Rassvet, Poisk, Nauka, and Prichal.

By the mid-2020s, RSC Energia faced growing challenges from aging infrastructure, missed deadlines, and rising debts. The company is highly dependent on international clients, and this revenue stream has declined since the launch of the new spacecraft in the West, and the war against Ukraine has only accelerated the depletion. In August 2025, internal communications from CEO Igor Maltsev acknowledged greatest crisis since its founding, "multi-million-dollar debts," declining workforce morale, and the risk of collapse if reforms were not enacted. Before securing new international commercial contracts, they aim to maintain their partnership with the United States until 2030. Analysts noted that these financial difficulties in the future threatened Russia's human spaceflight program and capability, in which Energia serves as the primary contractor for Soyuz and ISS operations.

== Facilities ==
RSC Energia is headquartered in Korolyov, Moscow Oblast, where it maintains design, assembly, and testing facilities. It also operates integration and launch support teams at the Baikonur Cosmodrome in Kazakhstan and the Vostochny Cosmodrome in Russia.

== Programs ==
=== Spacecraft ===
- Vostok (1961–1963)
- Voskhod (1964–1965)
- Soyuz (1967–present)
- Progress (1978–present)
- Buran (1988)

=== Space stations ===
- Salyut programme (1971–1986)
- Mir (1986–2001)
- International Space Station (1998-present) – design and construction of the Russian Orbital Segment, including Zvezda, Pirs, Poisk, Rassvet, Nauka, and Prichal modules

=== Launch vehicles ===
- R-7 and derivatives (development, now produced by RKTs Progress)
- N1 (1965–1972)
- Energia heavy-lift rocket (1987–1988)

=== Satellites and probes ===
- Luna (Moon probes)
- Venera (Venus probes)
- Mars probes
- Polyus orbital weapons platform (1987, failed to reach orbit)

=== Future ===
RSC Energia remains the lead contractor for Russia's participation in the International Space Station and is developing the Orel spacecraft for future lunar and deep-space missions. The company also collaborates with Roscosmos and industry partners on commercial satellite platforms and next-generation orbital infrastructure.
