= Russian Orbital Segment =

Russian components of the International Space Station

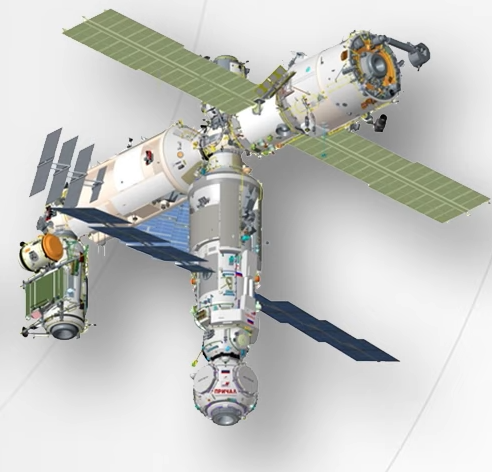
ISS Russian orbital segment after docking of UM Prichal module

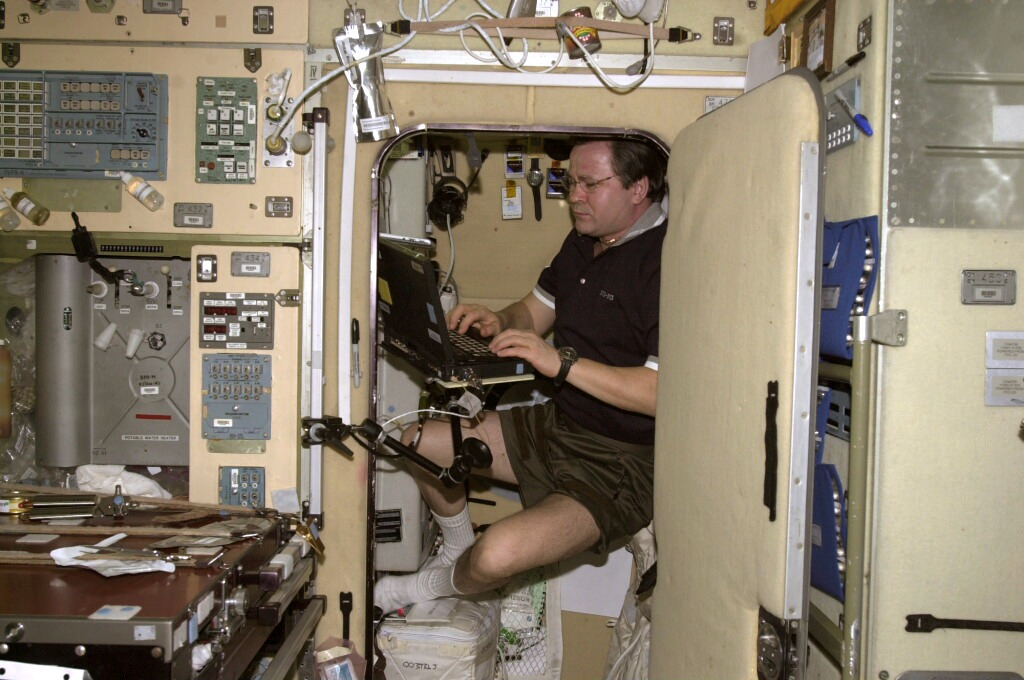
Cosmonaut Nikolai Budarin working inside one of the crew quarters aboard Zvezda service module

The Russian Orbital Segment (ROS) is the name given to the components of the International Space Station (ISS) constructed in Russia and operated by the Russian Roscosmos. The ROS handles Guidance, Navigation, and Control for the entire Station.

== Current composition ==
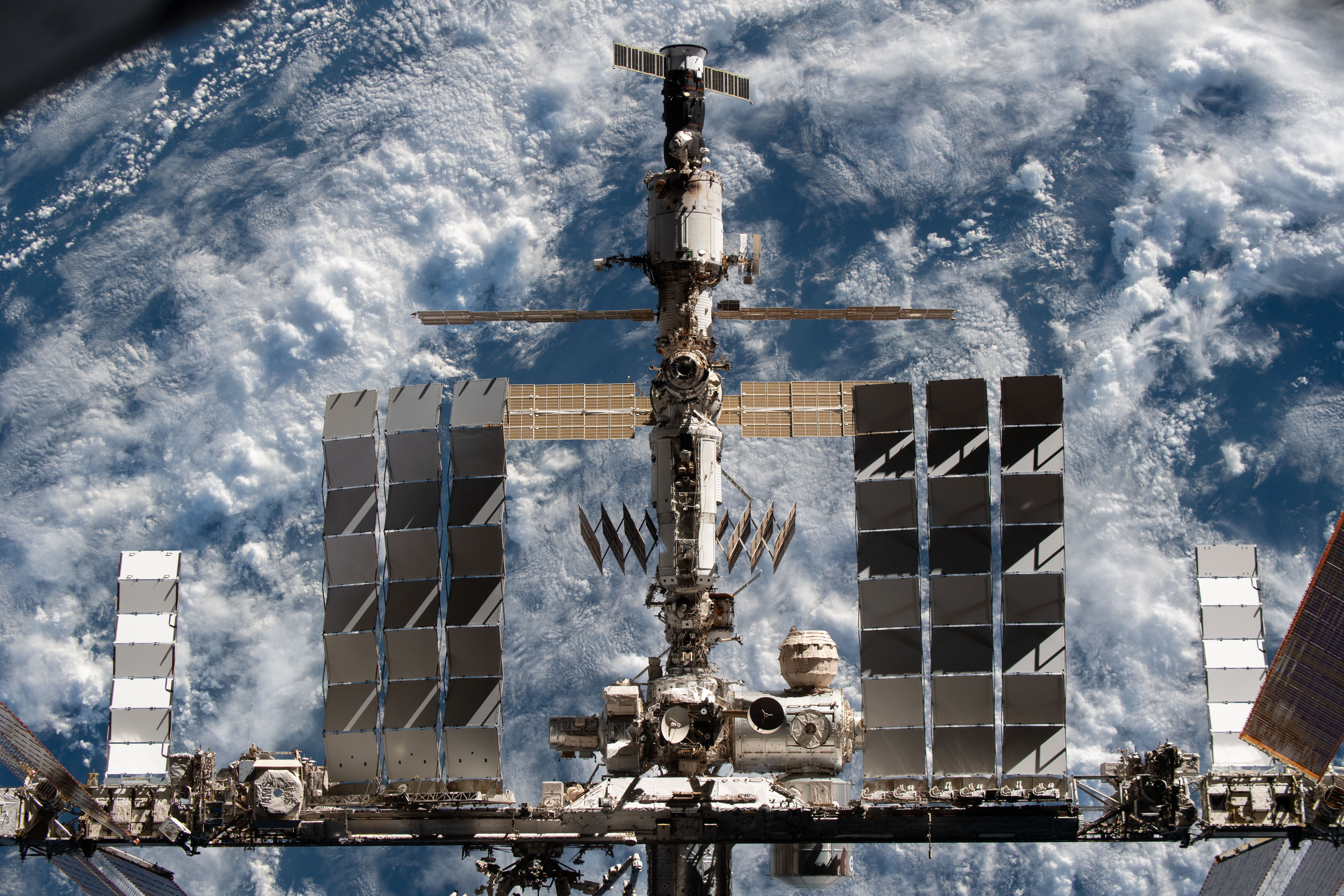
Dorsal side of the ROS in November 2021

The segment currently consists of six modules, which together essentially comprise the base configuration of the cancelled Russian space station Mir-2. The segment is controlled directly from Roskosmos's Mission Control Center in Moscow. The six modules are (in order of launch):

- Zarya (dawn)
- Zvezda (star)
- Poisk (search)
- Rassvet (sunrise, dawn)
- Nauka (science)
- Prichal (berth)

The first module, Zarya, otherwise known as the Functional Cargo Block or FGB, was the first component of the ISS to be launched, and provided the early station configuration with electrical power, storage, propulsion, and navigation guidance, until a short time after the Russian service module Zvezda docked and control was transferred. Zvezda contains the ESA built DMS-R Data Management System. Now primarily used for storage, Zarya provides ports for Soyuz and Progress spacecraft and the European ATV to dock to the station. Ships boosting the station's orbit dock to the aft port (the rear port according to the station's normal orientation and direction of travel). The FGB is a descendant of the TKS spacecraft designed for the Russian Salyut program. 5.4 tons of propellant fuel can be stored and transferred automatically to and from ships docked. Zarya was originally intended as a module for the Russian Mir space station, but was not flown as of the end of the Mir-1 program. Developed by Russia and the former Soviet Union, construction of Zarya was funded by the United States and NASA, and Zarya remains a US-owned module.

The second module, Zvezda, is the station's Service Module - it provides a living environment for the crew, contains the ISS's main engine system, and provides a docking port for Soyuz, Progress and Automated Transfer Vehicle spacecraft.

The third module to be launched, Poisk, is similar to Pirs. Redundancy in airlocks allowed one airlock to be repaired internally and externally whilst crew use the other airlock to exit and re-enter the station.

The fourth module to be launched, Rassvet, is primarily used for cargo storage and as a docking port for visiting spacecraft.

The fifth module to be launched, Nauka, also known as the Multipurpose Laboratory Module, is the main laboratory space of the ROS. A backup flight article for FGB-based Zarya, known in production as FGB-2, was originally planned to serve as the Universal Docking Module, though its construction had been halted at 70% completion in the late 1990s. It occupies the former location of Pirs on Zvezda's nadir port.

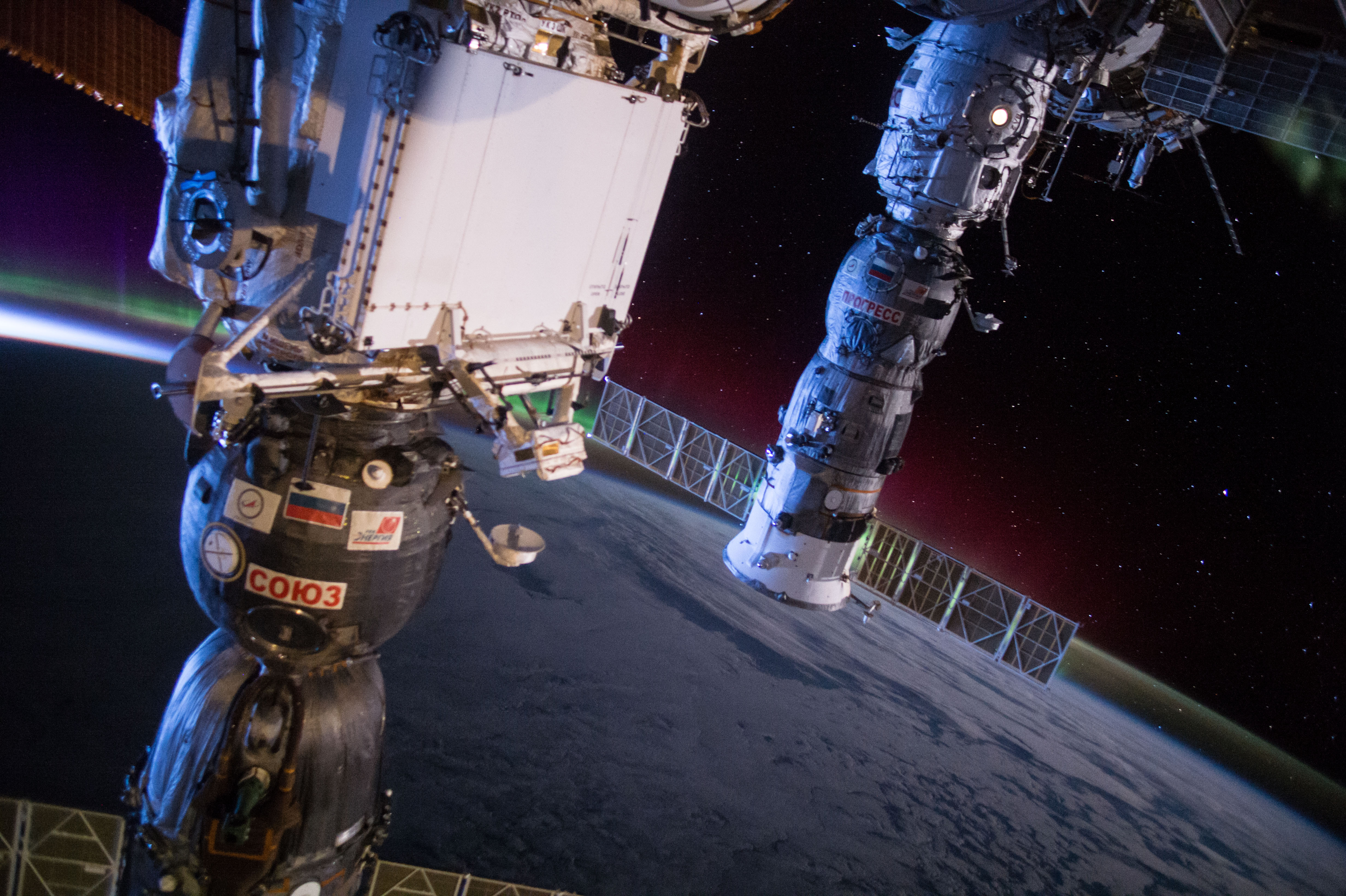
View of the Poisk (back) and Rassvet module (front), both with docked Soyuz capsules, in moonlight (2015)

The sixth module to be launched, Prichal also known as Uzlovoy Module is a nodal module that has a pressurized spherical ball-shaped design with six hybrid docking ports. It is attached to the nadir port of the Nauka module.

== Former module ==
Pirs, launched on 14 September 2001, was the third module of the ROS to be launched. It functioned as the ROS's airlock, storing EVA spacesuits and providing the equipment necessary for cosmonauts to exit the space station. It also served as a docking compartment for Soyuz and Progress spacecraft. It was decommissioned and undocked by Progress MS-16 on 26 July 2021, and burned up in the atmosphere, to make way for the Nauka module.

== Formerly proposed modules ==
On 17 June 2009, the Russian Federal Space Agency (Roskosmos) presented to NASA and the other ISS partners a proposal to add additional modules to the Russian segment to ensure its viability past 2016 or even 2020.

It was planned that the two larger modules, nominally referred to as NEM 1 and 2, would be lifted to orbit via Angara A5 launchers in the mid-2020s and would be attached to the port and starboard sides of the Nodal Module, leaving its aft docking port accessible for possible future expandability or using it for commercial vehicles like Crew Dragon via an International Docking Adapter attached on top of this port and its nadir port accessible for docking by Soyuz or Progress spacecraft. Because of the proximity of the Nodal Module to the planned attachment point of MRM-1 on the nadir docking port of Zarya FGB to facilitate docking of Soyuz and Progress spacecraft, the module's forward-facing port will be unusable. As of January 2021, neither Roscosmos nor NASA have provided further details of these modules or verification that they have been officially funded by the Russian government or added to the ISS launch manifest schedule.

Continued international collaboration relating to the ISS has been thrown into doubt by the 2022 Russian invasion of Ukraine and related sanctions on Russia.

Due to the different orbit from ISS, the future Russian Orbital Service Station is planned to be a completely new space station, without inheriting any module from the Russian Orbital Segment or adding new modules to the ISS. In such a case, the planned characteristics of the ISS's Prichal module will be of no use and an identical node module will then be constructed for the ROSS station. The NEM-1 and 2 will be repurposed and flown directly to the new space station.

The Oka-T-MKS was a planned companion module to the ISS. Reported as of December 2012 to be under construction, its development has been significantly delayed. The module would be free-floating most of the time as an autonomous orbital space laboratory for the conduction of experiments, and dock with the ISS for experiment maintenance about every 180 days. The Oka-T-MKS space laboratory was contracted to Energia by Roscosmos in 2012. Originally projected for a 2015 launch date, this has been pushed back indefinitely and some evidence suggests that, unable to locate significant development partnerships, its development has been abandoned.

== See also ==
- Orbital Piloted Assembly and Experiment Complex - proposed separation of parts of ROS into a separate space station
- Scientific research on the ISS

Preceded by Mir-2	Russian Orbital Segment; November 1993 - 2015/2024	Succeeded by
