= Assembly of the International Space Station =

Process of assembling the International Space Station

Animation of the assembly of the International Space Station

The process of assembling the International Space Station (ISS) has been under way since the 1990s. Zarya, the first ISS module, was launched by a Proton rocket on 20 November 1998. The STS-88 Space Shuttle mission followed two weeks after Zarya was launched, bringing Unity, the first of three node modules, and connecting it to Zarya. This bare 2-module core of the ISS remained uncrewed for the next one and a half years, until in July 2000 the Russian module Zvezda was launched by a Proton rocket, allowing a maximum crew of three astronauts or cosmonauts to be on the ISS permanently.

The ISS has a pressurized volume of approximately 1,000 cubic metres (35,000 cu ft), a mass of approximately 410,000 kilograms (900,000 lb), approximately 100 kilowatts of power output, a truss 108.4 metres (356 ft) long, modules 74 metres (243 ft) long, and a crew of seven. Building the complete station required more than 40 assembly flights. As of 2026, 36 Space Shuttle flights delivered ISS elements. Other assembly flights consisted of modules lifted by the Falcon 9, Russian Proton rocket or, in the case of Pirs and Poisk, the Soyuz-U rocket.

Some of the larger modules include:

- Zarya (launched 20 November 1998)
- Unity Module (launched 4 December 1998, also known as Node 1)
- Zvezda (launched 12 July 2000)
- Destiny Laboratory Module (launched 7 February 2001)
- Harmony Module (launched 23 October 2007, also known as Node 2)
- Columbus orbital facility (launched 7 February 2008)
- Japanese Experiment Module, also known as Kibō (launched in multiple flights between 2008 and 2009)
- The truss, original and iROSA solar panels (unpressurized, truss and original panels launched in multiple flights between 2000 and 2009, iROSAs launched between 2021 and 2026)
- Nauka (MLM-U) (launched 21 July 2021)

== Logistics ==
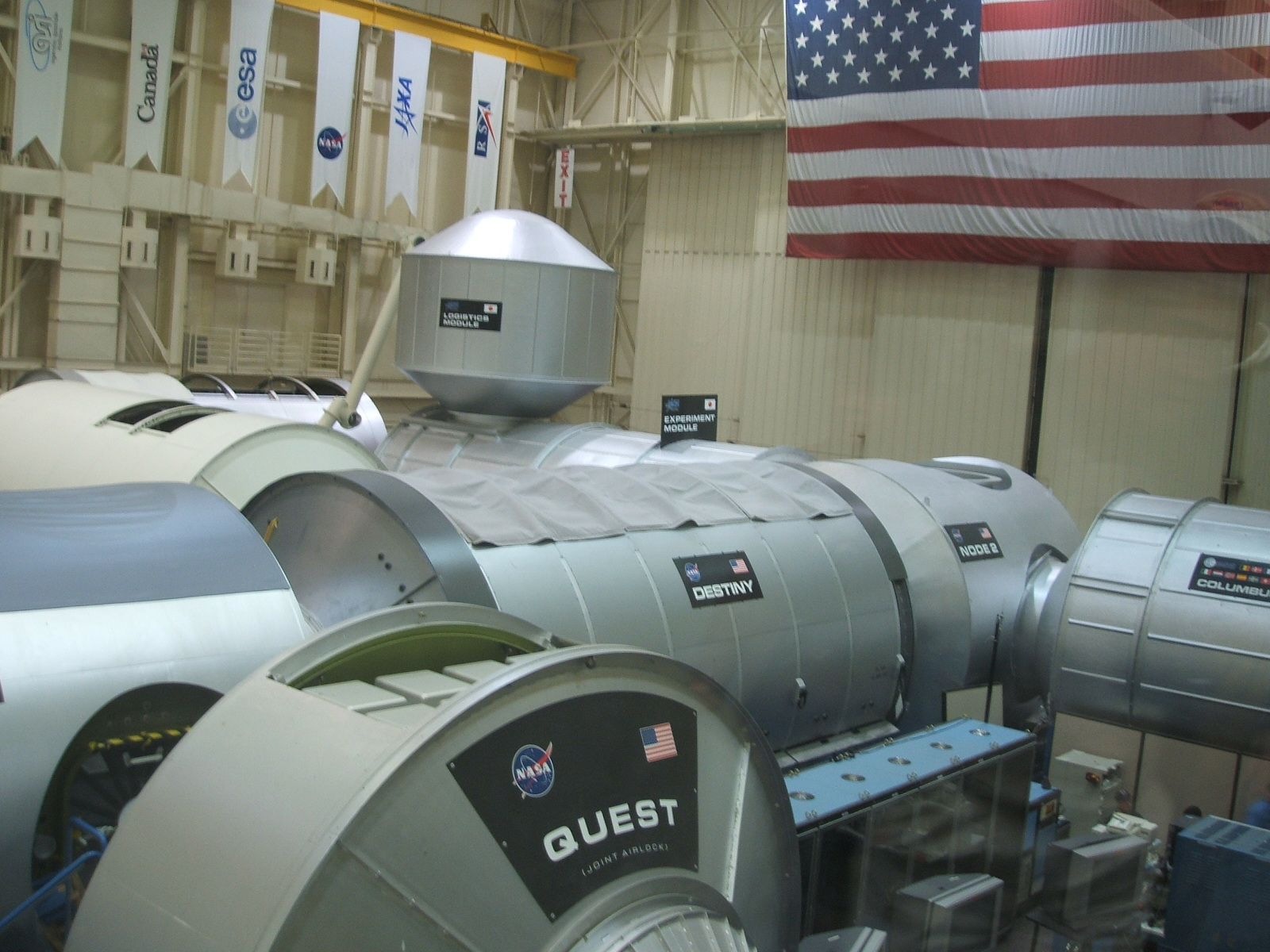
International Space Station mockup at Johnson Space Center in Houston, Texas.

The space station is located in orbit around the Earth at an altitude of approximately 410 km (250 mi), a type of orbit usually termed low Earth orbit (the actual height varies over time by several kilometers due to atmospheric drag and reboosts). It orbits Earth in a period of about 90 minutes; by August 2007 it had completed more than 50,000 orbits since launch of Zarya on 20 November 1998.

A total of 14 main pressurized modules were scheduled to be part of the ISS by its completion date in 2010. A number of smaller pressurized sections will be adjunct to them (Soyuz spacecraft (permanently 2 as lifeboats – 6 months rotations), Progress transporters (2 or more), the Quest and Pirs airlocks, as well as periodically the H-II Transfer Vehicle).

The US Orbital Segment was completed in 2011 after the installation of the Alpha Magnetic Spectrometer during the STS-134 mission. The Russian Orbital Segment assembly has been on an indefinite hiatus since the installation of the Rassvet module in 2010 during the STS-132 mission. The Rassvet module on the ISS right now was originally supposed to be the on-ground dynamic testing mock-up of the now-cancelled Science Power Platform. The Nauka science laboratory module contains new crew quarters, life support equipment that can produce oxygen and water, and a new galley. The Nauka was originally supposed to be delivered to the ISS in 2007 but cost overruns and quality control problems delayed it for over a decade. The Nauka module finally launched in July 2021 and docked to the nadir port of Zvezda module after several days of free flight followed by the Prichal which launched on 24 November 2021.

There are plans to add 2 or 3 more modules that would attach to Prichal during the mid-2020s. Adding more Russian modules will help the Zvezda module greatly because Zvezda's originally installed central command computers no longer work (three ThinkPad laptops are now the Zvezda's central command computers) and its Elektron oxygen generators are not replaceable and failed again for a short time in 2020 after multiple malfunctions throughout their history. In Russian modules all the hardware is launched with the equipment permanently installed. It is impossible to replace hardware like in the US Orbital Segment with its very wide 51 inch (105 cm) hatch openings between modules. This potential problem with the Zvezda was made apparent when in October 2020 the toilet, oven, and Elektron all malfunctioned at the same time and the cosmonauts onboard had to make emergency repairs.

The ISS consists of a set of communicating pressurized modules connected to a truss, on which four large pairs of photovoltaic modules (solar panels) are attached. The pressurized modules and the truss are perpendicular: the truss spanning from starboard to port and the habitable zone extending on the aft-forward axis. Although during the construction the station attitude may vary, when all four photovoltaic modules are in their definitive position the aft-forward axis will be parallel to the velocity vector.

In addition to the assembly and utilization flights, approximately 30 Progress spacecraft flights were required to provide logistics until 2010. Experimental equipment, fuel and consumables are and will be delivered by all vehicles visiting the ISS: the SpaceX Dragon, the Russian Progress, the European ATV and the Japanese HTV, and space station downmass will be carried back to Earth facilities on the Dragon and crewed Soyuz.

== Columbia disaster and changes in construction plans ==
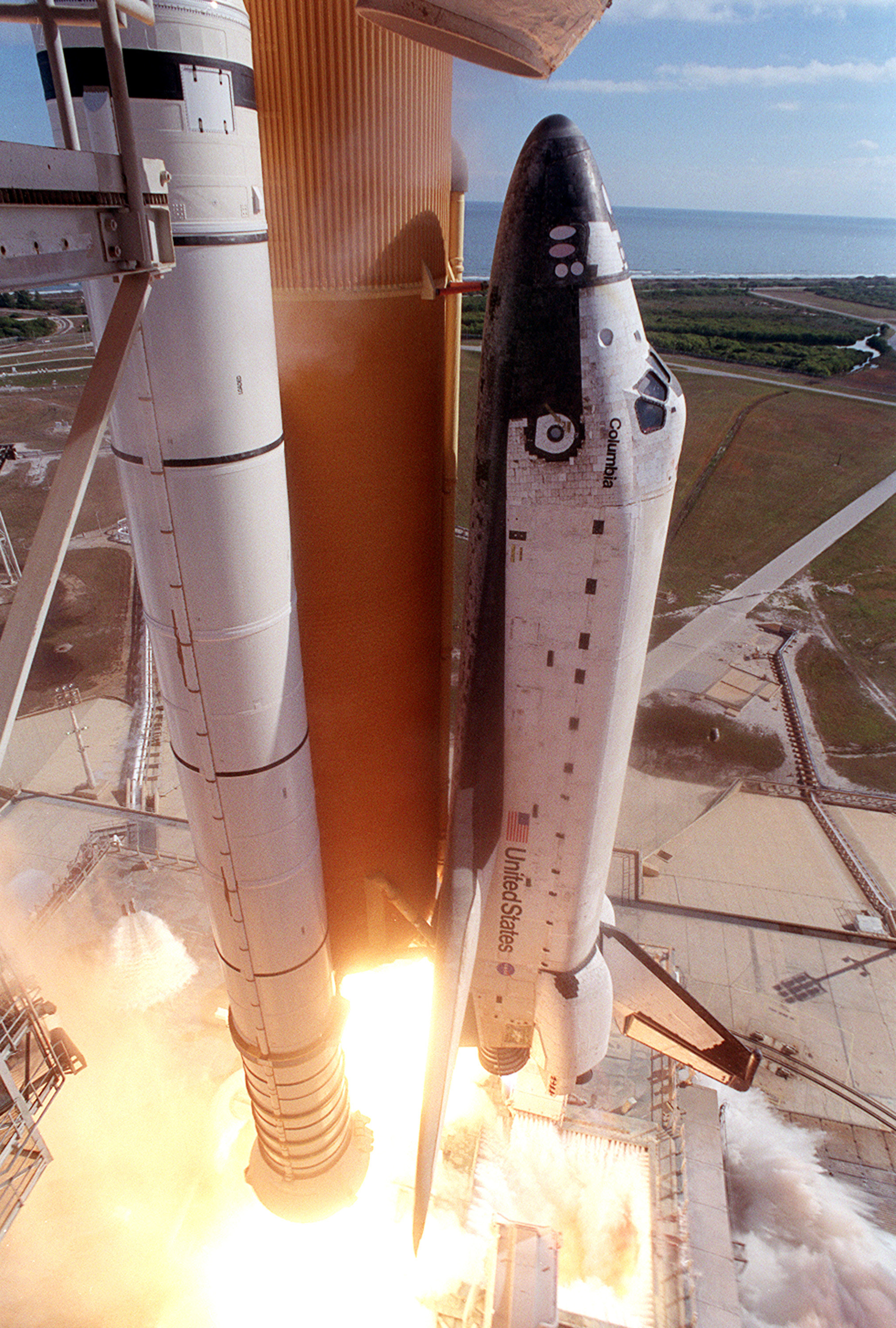
Columbia lifting off on its final mission.

=== Disaster and consequences ===
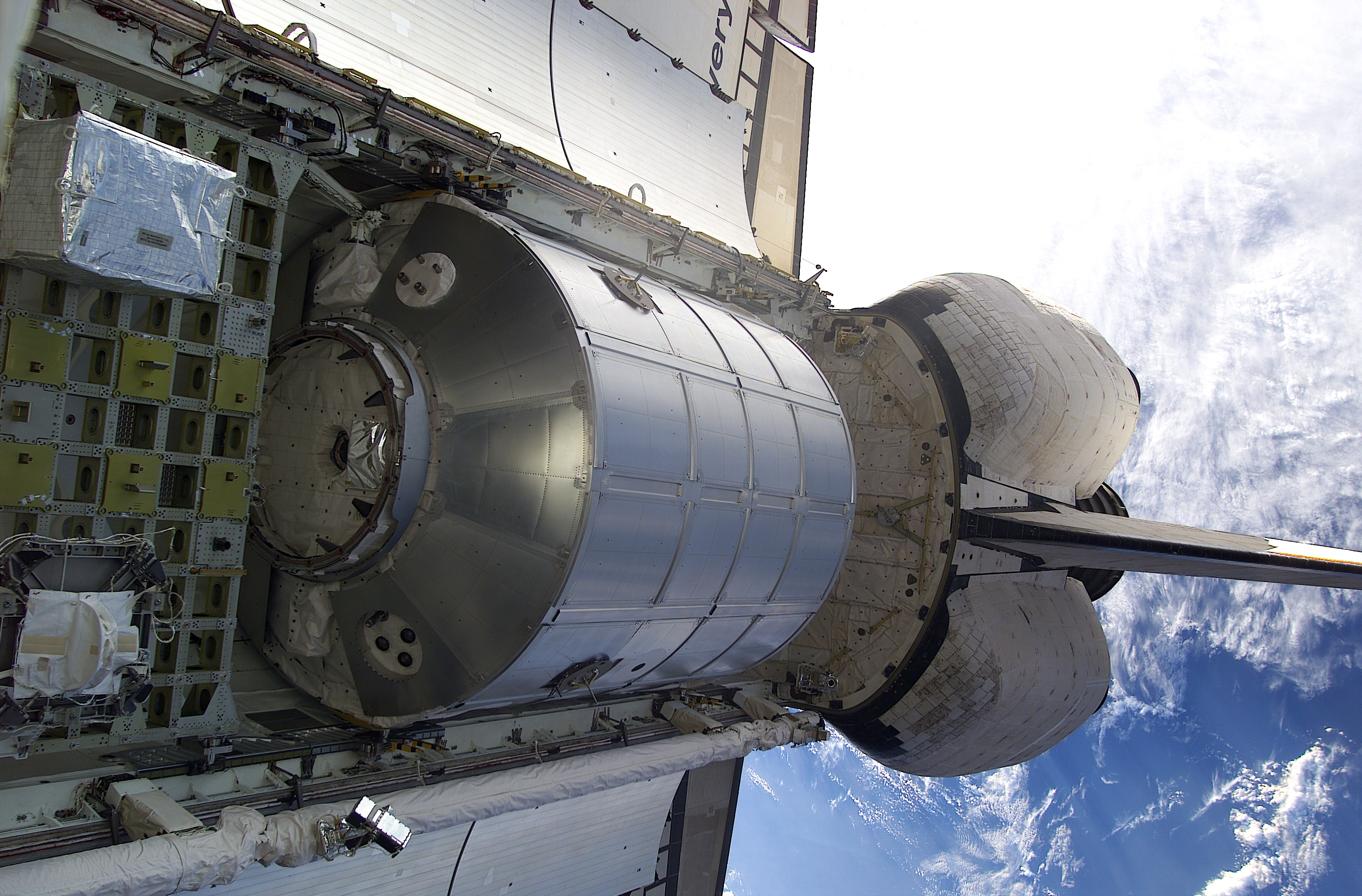
10 March 2001 – The Leonardo Multi-Purpose Logistics Module rests in Space Shuttle Discovery's payload bay during STS-102.

After the Space Shuttle Columbia disaster on 1 February 2003, there was some uncertainty over the future of the ISS. The subsequent two and a half-year suspension of the U.S. Space Shuttle program, followed by problems with resuming flight operations in 2005, were major obstacles.

The Space Shuttle program resumed flight on 26 July 2005, with the STS-114 mission of Discovery. This mission to the ISS was intended both to test new safety measures implemented since the Columbia disaster and deliver supplies to the station. Although the mission succeeded, it was not without risk; foam was shed by the external tank, leading NASA to announce future missions would be grounded until this issue was resolved.

Between the Columbia disaster and the resumption of Shuttle launches, crew exchanges were carried out solely using the Russian Soyuz spacecraft. Starting with Expedition 7, two-astronaut caretaker crews were launched in contrast to the previously launched crews of three. Because the ISS had not been visited by a shuttle for an extended period, a larger than planned amount of waste accumulated, temporarily hindering station operations in 2004. However Progress transports and the STS-114 shuttle flight took care of this problem.

=== Changes in construction plans ===
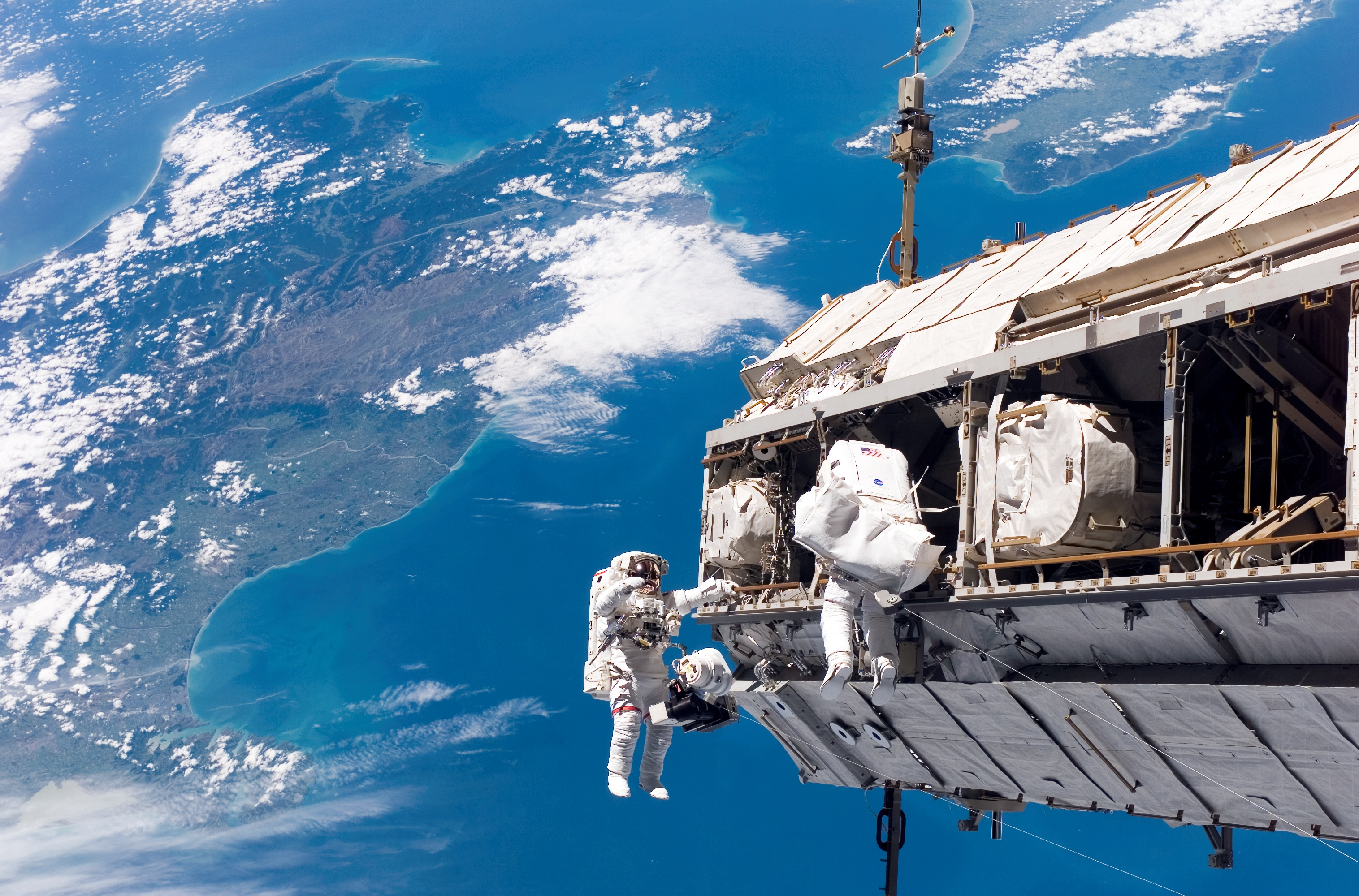
Construction of the International Space Station over New Zealand.

Many changes were made to the originally planned ISS, even before the Columbia disaster. Modules and other structures were cancelled or replaced, and the number of Shuttle flights to the ISS was reduced from previously planned numbers. However, more than 80% of the hardware intended to be part of the ISS in the late 1990s was orbited and is now part of the ISS's configuration.

During the shuttle stand-down, construction of the ISS was halted and the science conducted aboard was limited due to the crew size of two, adding to earlier delays due to Shuttle problems and the Russian space agency's budget constraints.

In March 2006, a meeting of the heads of the five participating space agencies accepted the new ISS construction schedule that planned to complete the ISS by 2010.

In May 2009, a crew of six had been established following 12 Shuttle construction flights after the second "Return to Flight" mission STS-121. Requirements for stepping up the crew size included enhanced environmental support on the ISS, a second Soyuz permanently docked on the station to function as a second 'lifeboat', more frequent Progress flights to provide double the amount of consumables, more fuel for orbit raising maneuvers, and a sufficient supply line of experimental equipment. As of November 2020, the crew capacity has increased to seven due to the launch of Crew Dragon by SpaceX, which can carry 4 astronauts to the ISS.

Later additions included the Bigelow Expandable Activity Module (BEAM) in 2016, and numerous Russian components are planned as part of the in-orbit construction of OPSEK.

== Assembly sequence ==
ISS elements

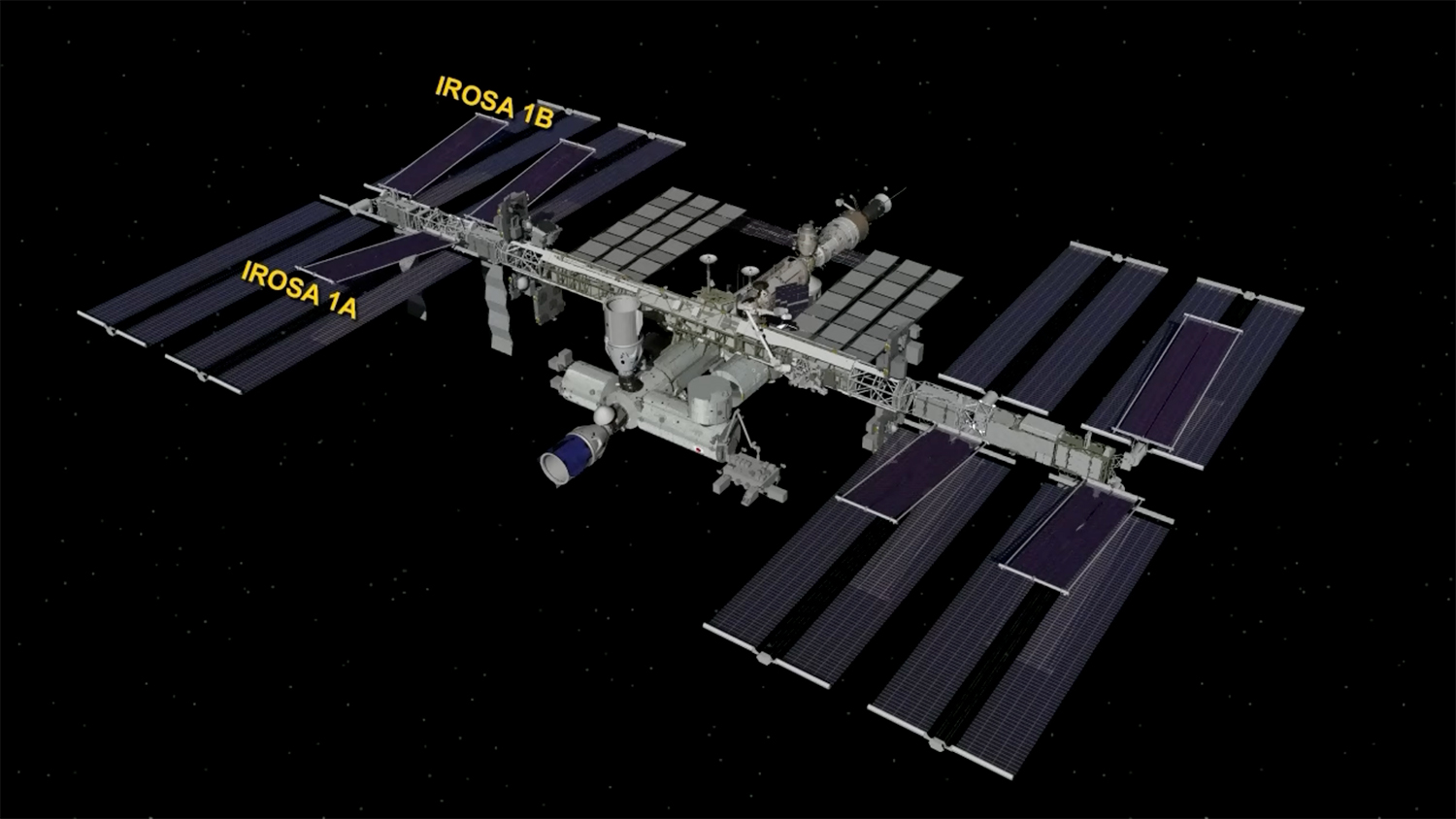
Structure of the International Space Station in June 2026, after the installation of all iROSAs

The ISS is made up of 16 pressurized modules: six Russian modules (Zarya, Zvezda, Poisk, Rassvet, Nauka, and Prichal), eight US modules (BEAM, Leonardo, Harmony, Quest, Tranquility, Unity, Cupola, and Destiny), one Japanese module (Kibō) and one European module (Columbus).

At least one Russian pressurized module (Pirs) is deorbited till now.

Although not permanently docked with the ISS, Multi-Purpose Logistics Modules (MPLMs) formed part of the ISS during some Shuttle missions. An MPLM was attached to Harmony (initially to Unity) and was used for resupply and logistics flights.

Spacecraft attached to the ISS also extend the pressurized volume. At least one spacecraft is always docked as a 'lifeboat', and each is replaced approximately every six months as part of nominal crew rotations. The table below shows the sequence in which these components were added to the ISS. Decommissioned and deorbited Modules are shown in gray.

Element	Assembly flight	Launch date	Launch vehicle	Length	Diameter	Mass	Isolated View	Station View
Zarya (FGB)	1A/R	1998-11-20	Proton-K	12.56 m (41.2 ft)	4.1 m (13 ft)	24,968 kg (55,045 lb)		
Unity (Node 1)	2A	1998-12-04	Space Shuttle Endeavour (STS-88)	5.5 m (18 ft)	4.3 m (14 ft)	11,895 kg (26,224 lb)		
PMA-1	2A	1998-12-04	Space Shuttle Endeavour (STS-88)	1.86 m (6 ft 1 in)	1.9 m (6 ft 3 in)	1,589 kg (3,503 lb)		
PMA-2	2A	1998-12-04	Space Shuttle Endeavour (STS-88)	1.86 m (6 ft 1 in)	1.9 m (6 ft 3 in)	1,376 kg (3,034 lb)		
Zvezda (Service Module)	1R	2000-07-12	Proton-K	13.1 m (43 ft)	4.2 m (14 ft)	24,604 kg (54,243 lb)		
Z1 Truss	3A	2000-10-11	Space Shuttle Discovery (STS-92)	4.6 m (15 ft)	4.2 m (14 ft)	8,755 kg (19,301 lb)		
PMA-3	3A	2000-10-11	Space Shuttle Discovery (STS-92)	1.86 m (6 ft 1 in)	1.9 m (6 ft 3 in)	1,183 kg (2,608 lb)		
P6 Truss & Solar Arrays	4A	2000-11-30	Space Shuttle Endeavour (STS-97)	18.3 m (60 ft)	10.7 m (35 ft) deployed	15,824 kg (34,886 lb)		
Destiny (US Laboratory)	5A	2001-02-07	Space Shuttle Atlantis (STS-98)	9.2 m (30 ft)	4.3 m (14 ft)	14,515 kg (32,000 lb)		
ESP-1	5A.1	2001-03-08	Space Shuttle Discovery (STS-102)	2.4 m (7 ft 10 in)	0.46 m (1 ft 6 in)			
Canadarm2 (SSRMS)	6A	2001-04-19	Space Shuttle Endeavour (STS-100)	17.6 m (58 ft)	35 cm (14 in)	1,800 kg (4,000 lb)		
Quest (Joint Airlock)	7A	2001-07-12	Space Shuttle Atlantis (STS-104)	5.5 m (18 ft)	4.0 m (13.1 ft)	9,923 kg (21,876 lb)		
Pirs (Docking Compartment)	4R	2001-09-14	Soyuz-U (Progress M-SO1)	4.9 m (16 ft)	2.55 m (8.4 ft)	3,838 kg (8,461 lb)		
S0 Truss	8A	2002-04-08	Space Shuttle Atlantis (STS-110)	13.4 m (44 ft)	4.6 m (15 ft)	13,971 kg (30,801 lb)		
Mobile Base System	UF2	2002-06-05	Space Shuttle Endeavour (STS-111)			1,438 kg (3,170 lb)		
S1 Truss	9A	2002-10-07	Space Shuttle Atlantis (STS-112)	13.7 m (45 ft)	4.6 m (15 ft)	14,124 kg (31,138 lb)		
P1 Truss	11A	2002-11-23	Space Shuttle Endeavour (STS-113)	13.7 m (45 ft)	4.6 m (15 ft)	14,003 kg (30,871 lb)		
ESP-2	LF1	2005-07-26	Space Shuttle Discovery (STS-114)	2.6 m (8 ft 6 in)	4.3 m (14 ft)			
P3/P4 Truss & Solar Arrays	12A	2006-09-09	Space Shuttle Atlantis (STS-115)	13.7 m (45 ft)	4.6 m (15 ft)	15,824 kg (34,886 lb)		
P5 Truss	12A.1	2006-12-09	Space Shuttle Discovery (STS-116)	3.37 m (11.1 ft)	4.55 m (14.9 ft)	1,864 kg (4,109 lb)		
S3/S4 Truss & Solar Arrays	13A	2007-06-08	Space Shuttle Atlantis (STS-117)	13.7 m (45 ft)	10.7 m (35 ft)	15,824 kg (34,886 lb)		
S5 Truss	13A.1	2007-08-08	Space Shuttle Endeavour (STS-118)	3.37 m (11.1 ft)	4.55 m (14.9 ft)	1,864 kg (4,109 lb)		
ESP-3	13A.1	2007-08-08	Space Shuttle Endeavour (STS-118)	2.6 m (8 ft 6 in)	4.3 m (14 ft)			
Harmony (Node 2)	10A	2007-10-23	Space Shuttle Discovery (STS-120)	7.2 m (24 ft)	4.4 m (14 ft)	14,300 kg (31,500 lb)		
Relocation of P6 Truss	10A	2007-10-23	Space Shuttle Discovery (STS-120)	18.3 m (60 ft)	10.7 m (35 ft) deployed	15,824 kg (34,886 lb)		
Columbus (European Laboratory)	1E	2008-02-07	Space Shuttle Atlantis (STS-122)	7 m (23 ft)	4.5 m (15 ft)	12,800 kg (28,219 lb)		
Dextre (SPDM)	1J/A	2008-03-11	Space Shuttle Endeavour (STS-123)	3.5 m (11 ft)	7 m (23 ft) outstretched	1,662 kg (3,664 lb)		
Experiment Logistics Module (ELM)	1J/A	2008-03-11	Space Shuttle Endeavour (STS-123)	4.21 m (13.8 ft)	4.39 m (14.4 ft)	8,386 kg (18,488 lb)		
JEM Pressurized Module (JEM-PM)	1J	2008-05-31	Space Shuttle Discovery (STS-124)	11.19 m (36.7 ft)	4.39 m (14.4 ft)	15,900 kg (35,100 lb)		
JEM Remote Manipulator System (JEMRMS)	1J	2008-05-31	Space Shuttle Discovery (STS-124)	10 m (33 ft)				
S6 Truss & Solar Arrays	15A	2009-03-15	Space Shuttle Discovery (STS-119)	18.3 m (60 ft)	10.7 m (35 ft) deployed	15,824 kg (34,886 lb)		
Kibo Exposed Facility (JEM-EF)	2J/A	2009-07-15	Space Shuttle Endeavour (STS-127)					
Poisk (MRM-2)	5R	2009-11-10	Soyuz-U (Progress M-MIM2)	4.049 m (13.28 ft)	2.55 m (8 ft 4 in)	3,670 kg (8,090 lb)		
ELC-1	ULF3	2009-11-16	Space Shuttle Atlantis (STS-129)			6,280 kg (13,850 lb)		
ELC-2	ULF3	2009-11-16	Space Shuttle Atlantis (STS-129)			6,100 kg (13,400 lb)		
Tranquility (Node 3)	20A	2010-02-08	Space Shuttle Endeavour (STS-130)	6.706 m (22.00 ft)	4.48 m (14.7 ft)	19,000 kg (42,000 lb)		
Cupola	20A	2010-02-08	Space Shuttle Endeavour (STS-130)	1.5 m (4 ft 11 in)	2.95 m (9 ft 8 in)	1,880 kg (4,140 lb)		
Rassvet (MRM-1)	ULF4	2010-05-14	Space Shuttle Atlantis (STS-132)	6 m (20 ft)	2.35 m (7 ft 9 in)	8,015 kg (17,670 lb)		
Nauka Science Airlock	ULF4	2010-05-14	Space Shuttle Atlantis (STS-132)			1,050 kg (2,310 lb)		
Nauka RTOd Radiator	ULF4	2010-05-14	Space Shuttle Atlantis (STS-132)					
ERA portable workpost	ULF4	2010-05-14	Space Shuttle Atlantis (STS-132)					
Leonardo (PMM)	ULF5	2011-02-24	Space Shuttle Discovery (STS-133)	6.6 m (22 ft)	4.57 m (15.0 ft)	4,082 kg (8,999 lb)		
ELC-4	ULF5	2011-02-24	Space Shuttle Discovery (STS-133)			3,735 kg (8,234 lb)		
AMS-02	ULF6	2011-05-16	Space Shuttle Endeavour (STS-134)			7,500 kg (16,500 lb)		
OBSS	ULF6	2011-05-16	Space Shuttle Endeavour (STS-134)	15.24 m (50.0 ft)	35 cm (14 in)			
ELC-3	ULF6	2011-05-16	Space Shuttle Endeavour (STS-134)			6,361 kg (14,024 lb)		
HRSGF	CRS SpX-2	2013-03-13	Falcon 9 (SpaceX CRS-2)					
BEAM	CRS SpX-8	2016-04-08	Falcon 9 (SpaceX CRS-8)	4.01 m (13.2 ft)	3.23 m (10.6 ft)	1,413 kg (3,115 lb)		
IDA-2	CRS SpX-9	2016-07-18	Falcon 9 (SpaceX CRS-9)	110 cm (43 in)	160 cm (63 in)	526 kg (1,160 lb)		
IDA-3	CRS SpX-18	2019-07-25	Falcon 9 (SpaceX CRS-18)	110 cm (43 in)	160 cm (63 in)	526 kg (1,160 lb)		
Bartolomeo	CRS SpX-20	2020-03-06	Falcon 9 (SpaceX CRS-20).					
Nanoracks Bishop Airlock	CRS SpX-21	2020-12-06	Falcon 9 (SpaceX CRS-21)	1.80 m (5 ft 11 in)	2.014 m (6 ft 7.3 in)	1,059 kg (2,335 lb)		
iROSA 1 and 2	CRS SpX-22	2021-06-03	Falcon 9 (SpaceX CRS-22)			325 kg (717 lb)		
Nauka (MLM-U)	3R	2021-07-21	Proton-M	13 m (43 ft)	4.25 m (13.9 ft)	20,300 kg (44,800 lb)		
European Robotic Arm	3R	2021-07-21	Proton-M	11.3 m (37 ft)		630 kg (1,390 lb)		
Nauka SSPA-GM temporary docking adapter	3R	2021-07-21	Proton-M					
MLM Means of Attachment of Large payloads (LCCS Part)	79P	2021-10-28	Soyuz 2.1a (Progress MS-18)					
Prichal	6R	2021-11-24	Soyuz 2.1b (Progress M-UM)	4.91 m (16.1 ft)	3.3 m (11 ft)	3,890 kg (8,580 lb)		
MLM Means of Attachment of Large payloads (SCCS Part)	82P	2022-10-26	Soyuz 2.1a (Progress MS-21)					
iROSA 3 and 4	CRS SpX-26	2022-11-26	Falcon 9 (SpaceX CRS-26)			325 kg (717 lb)		
iROSA 5 and 6	CRS SpX-28	2023-06-05	Falcon 9 (SpaceX CRS-28)			325 kg (717 lb)		
iROSA 7 and 8	CRS SpX-35	2026-10-13	Falcon 9 (SpaceX CRS-35)			325 kg (717 lb)		

== Future elements ==
- Axiom Space plans to launch one module, the Payload Power Thermal Module (PPTM), to the ISS to inaugurate its commercial Axiom Station project.

== Cancelled modules ==
Diagram of the planned ISS circa 1999

- Interim Control Module – not needed once Zvezda was launched
- ISS Propulsion Module – not needed once Zvezda was launched
- Habitation Module (HAB) – With the cancellation of the Habitation Module, sleeping places are now spread throughout the station. There are two in the Russian segment and four in the US segment. It is not necessary to have a separate 'bunk' in space – many visitors just strap their sleeping bag to the wall of a module, get into it and sleep.
- Crew Return Vehicle (CRV) – replaced by crewed spacecraft docked to the station at all times (Soyuz, SpaceX Dragon 2)
- Centrifuge Accommodations Module (CAM) – would have been attached to Harmony (Node 2)
- Nautilus-X Centrifuge Demonstration – If produced, this centrifuge would have been the first in-space demonstration of sufficient scale centrifuge for artificial partial-g effects. It was designed to become a sleep module for the ISS crew.
- Science Power Platform (SPP) – would have added additional power and roll-axis control to the ISS.
- Russian Research Modules (RM1 and RM2) – replaced by single Multipurpose Laboratory Module (Nauka)
- Universal Docking Module (UDM) – cancelled along with the Research Modules which were to connect to it
- Science Power Module (NEM) – cancelled in April 2021 and used as the core module of the proposed Russian Orbital Service Station (ROSS).

== Unused modules ==
The following module was built, but has not been used in future plans for the ISS as of January 2021.

- American Node 4 – Also known as the Docking Hub System (DHS), would allow the station to have more docking ports for visiting vehicles and would allow inflatable habitats and technology demonstrations to be tested as part of the station.

== Cost ==
The ISS is credited as the most expensive item ever built, costing around $150 billion (USD), making it more expensive than Skylab (costing US$2.2 billion) and Mir (US$4.2 billion).

== See also ==
- List of human spaceflights to the International Space Station
- Uncrewed spaceflights to the International Space Station
- Manufacturing of the International Space Station
