= European Robotic Arm =

Robotic arm installed on the ISS

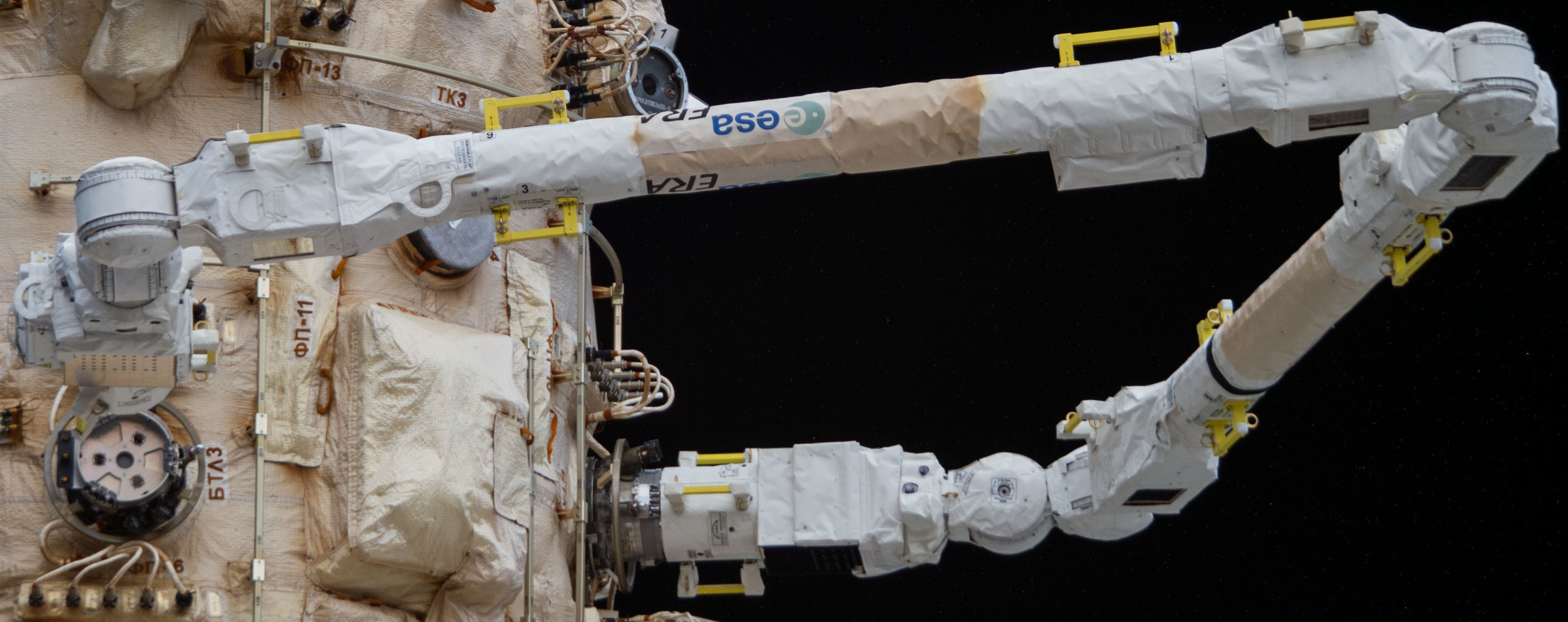
- The European Robotic Arm seen attached to the Nauka module on 29 April 2022

Module statistics
- Part of: International Space Station
- Launch date: 21 July 2021, 14:58:25 UTC
- Launch vehicle: Proton-M
- Docked: 29 July 2021, 13:29:01 UTC
- Mass: 630 kilograms (1,390 lb)
- Length: 11.3 metres (37 ft)

Configuration
- Rendering of European Robotic Arm on Nauka Module

The European Robotic Arm (ERA) is a robotic arm that is attached to the Russian Orbital Segment (ROS) of the International Space Station. Launched to the ISS in July 2021; it is the first robotic arm that is able to work on the Russian Segment of the station. The arm supplements the two Russian Strela cargo cranes that were originally installed on the Pirs module, but were later moved to the docking compartment Poisk and Zarya module.

The ERA was developed for the European Space Agency (ESA) by a number of European space companies. Airbus Defence and Space Netherlands (formerly Dutch Space) designed and assembled the arm and was the prime contractor; it worked along with subcontractors in 8 countries. In 2010, a spare elbow joint for the arm and ERA's Portable Workpost was launched preemptively, attached to Rassvet or Mini Research Module 1(MRM-1). The Nauka Module and Prichal module serves as home base for ERA; originally, the arm was going to be attached to the canceled Russian Research Module and later to the also canceled Science Power Platform.

== Technical characteristics ==
The European Robotic arm consists of two 'limbs' that are symmetrical sections made primarily of carbon fibre reinforced plastic, and are approximately 5 m (16 ft) long. At either end of the arm are identical gripper mechanisms called End Effectors (EES), which the arm uses to hold onto the station, grab onto payloads, and to assist in EVA activities. In total there are seven motorized joints, three are located at each of the wrists, and allow for roll, yaw, and pitch movements, giving 7 degrees of freedom of movement. The elbow consists of one motorized joint, which is limited to pitch movements. The arm is controlled by the ERA Control Computer (ECC), or On Board Computer (OBC) which is located towards the elbow. The two limb design of the arm gives it the ability to 'walk' around the exterior of the Russian segment of the station under its own control, moving hand-over-hand between the pre-fixed base points.

When fully extended the arm has a total length of 11.3 m (37 ft), and can reach 9.7 metres (32 ft) and has 7 degrees of freedom. It has a mass of 630 kilograms (1,390 lb) and can hold a total payload mass of 8,000 kilograms (18,000 lb). The arm's tip can reach a speed of 0.1 metres per second (0.33 ft/s) and has an accuracy of 5 mm (0.20 in). The European Robotics Arm itself was designed to be serviceable with spare parts kept outside Rassvet module and allow for the exchange of large parts via EVA in case of failure or an emergency situation. These parts are called EVA Replaceable Units (ERUs), also referred to as Orbital Replacement Units (ORUs), which can all be replaced in-orbit; the ERA is composed of three ERU sections. The arm is wrapped with beta cloth blankets for thermal protection.

On average the arm uses 475 watts of power to operate while having a peak operational power consumption of 800 watts. When on standby the arm only consumes 420 watts, and 250 watts while in hibernation.

=== End effectors ===
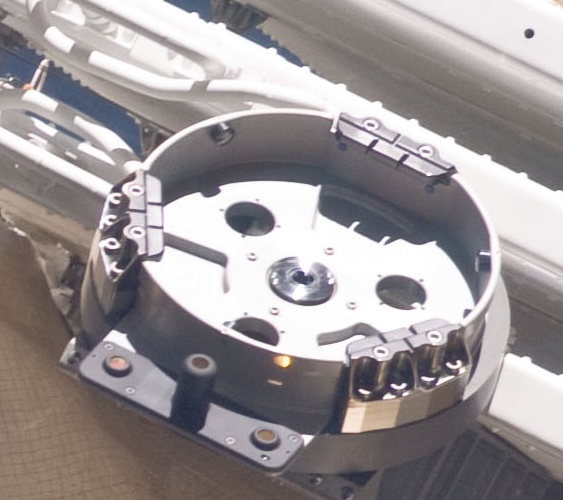
A grapple fixture used by the European Robotic Arm, located on the Rassvet Mini-Research Module 1 (MRM1) of the International Space Station. This fixture, along with others allows for the European Robotic Arm to grapple and move around the station.

Located at either end of the arm are the End Effector Subsystems (EES). The EES is designed to attach specifically with the base points located on the Russian segment of the station. Since the ROS uses different base points than the US Orbital Segment, the arm is unable to operate and access the other parts of the station. The EES consists of two Basic End Effectors (BEE) that connect to Base Points (BP) and Grapple Fixtures (GF). During normal operations, one end effector is connected to a base point on the station, this provides a sufficiently stiff connection between the station and ERA, as well as enabling the transmission of power, data and video signals for operation of the ERA. At the same time, the second end effector provides mechanical and electrical power to the grappled objects, and allows for data transfer. Both of the end effectors are also capable of measuring torques/forces as well as contain a Camera and Lighting Unit (CLU) which aids in the control of the arm; an additional two CLUs are located on both limbs.

==== Integrated Servicing Tool ====
Located within each of the end effectors' lower compartment is an integrated servicing tool. It is used to provide torque for a grappled object, acting like a wrench. It is capable of screwing and unscrewing bolts. The IST head starts with rotating slowly at first upon system comment, until popping into the IST head receptacle, which allows it to provide the mechanical power to the screw interface.

=== Hardware and software ===
The ERA is controlled from a central computer called the ERA control computer. Control is assisted by the additional microprocessors located in the different subsystems.

==== ERA control computer (ECC) ====
The ECC is located towards the elbow of the ERA, and composes three main components; the Application Layer (AL), the Service Layer (SL), and the operating system (OS). The application layer contains the high level command, mission plan, and event handling; the service layer contains the main robot motion control loops, motion related checks and image processing; together the AL and SL constitute the Application software (ASW). Together the OS and ASW provide the main control the arm.

Located with in the ECC's RISC subsystem is the ERA's main central processing unit (CPU). The main CPU is a Temic designed ERC32 with 10 MHz clock, addressing 1.5 megabytes (Mb) of memory, as well as 32 kilobytes (Kb) of ROM.

The ECC's I/O subsystem includes an Intel 80C186 with 11 MHz clock addressing 16 kB ROM. It handles the communications between the RISC processor and the other subsystems of the ERA.

The ECC's housekeeping subsystem includes an Intel 80C31 with 8 kB ROM.

==== Joint subsystem ====
Located in each wrist and in the elbow, there is one microprocessor that takes care of the bus communication, local inhibits, and safety checks, as well as general housekeeping.

The communications of the Joint subsystem are handled by the Joint I/O which includes an Intel 80C31 with 8 MHz clock, and 24kB of ROM, as well as communication through dual ported RAM.

The control of the subsystem was handled by an Intel 80C32 with 27 MHz clock, addressing 16 kB ROM and 8 kB DPRAM. The processor ran high speed digital control loops.

==== End effector subsystem ====
While the ECC handles primary control of the end effectors, the EES still includes its own micro-processor to aid in control.

Using a torque/force sensor inside the end effectors, the ECC actively controls the arm's pose to keep the contact forces within tight limits. To handle the drift and calibration, the torque force sensor pre-processes the data locally, with its own microprocessor. The processor located within the sensor is an Intel 80C86 with 7.2 MHz clock, addressing 64kB of memory and 32 kB ROM.

A separate processor in the end effector control electronics takes care of the bus communication, grapple mechanism control, and general housekeeping. The processor also controls the Integrated Service Tool. The processor is Intel 80C31 with 12 MHz clock, addressing 32 kB RAM and 48 kB ROM.

== Control ==
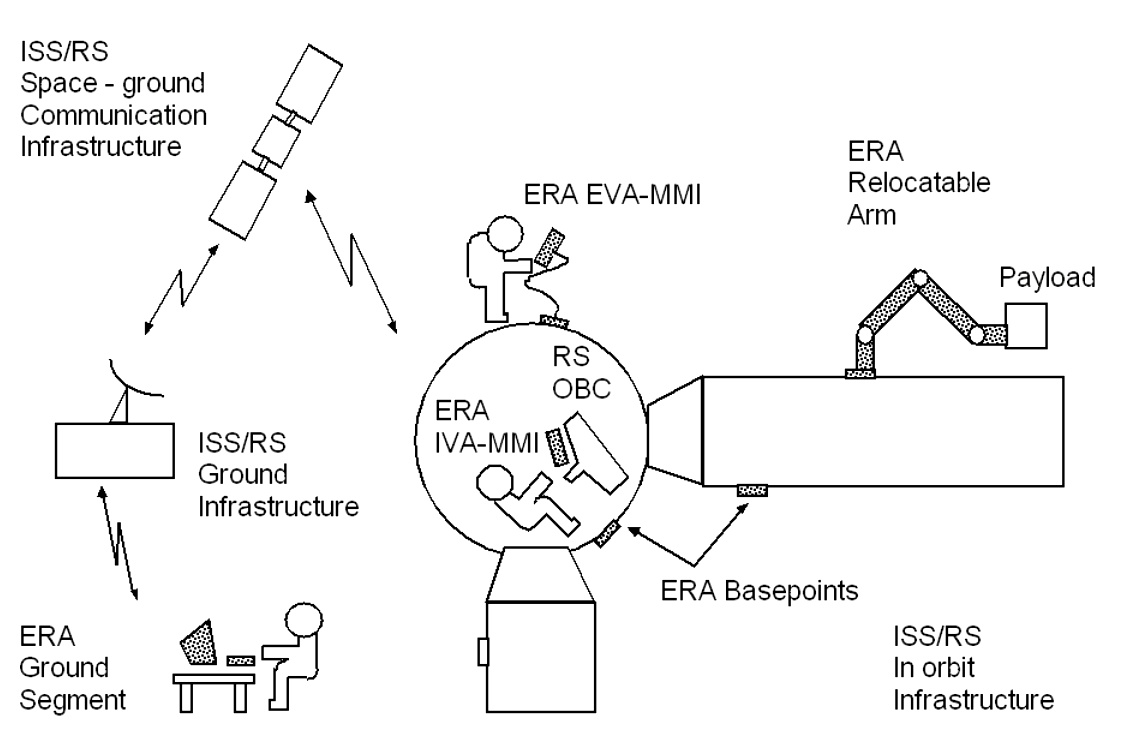
Control and data interfaces of ERA

Astronauts can control the ERA from both inside and outside the space station. The ERA is also the only robotic arm on the station to not include controllers, but is instead controlled through several different interfaces. While possessing multiple control modes, it is primarily used in autotrajectory mode, but manually selectable single-joint modes are also available. In addition to being able to be controlled from the station, ground operators can control the arm, as well.

=== EVA control ===
Control from outside the space station uses a specially designed interface that can be controlled while in a spacesuit known as the Extra Vehicular Activity-Man Machine Interface (EVA-MMI or EMMI). The EVA-MII has 16 LED displays of eight characters each; displaying essential status data, command verification data and emergency caution and warning messages. It also provides redundancy for critical status data through redundant LEDs.

The EVA-MMI allows for manual control of the arm in emergencies during an EVA. During manual control, only one degree of freedom at a time in a joint space, or one degree of freedom in Cartesian Space is able to be used. Also on the console is the emergency stop button which, when pressed, will activate brakes in all joints and at the same time send a command to the Russian Segment to switch the whole arm off. Whenever the ERA is active, there will always be two astronauts with an EVA-MMI, at two different locations. One has full control of the arm, while the other can at times issue an emergency stop command, as well as take over control of the arm. The EVA-MMI can survive long periods of space exposure, totaling up to 18 months.

=== Onboard control ===
Control from inside the space station is done by the Intra Vehicular Activity-Man Machine Interface (IVA-MMI), using a laptop, which shows a computer generated model of the ERA and its surroundings. As well on several monitors, video feeds from the arm are also available. In comparison to the EVA-MMI, the IVA-MMI provides more data from the arm, including the intended position of the arm. The IVA-MMI is used during servicing missions. The control systems finished development in 2001.

== Capabilities ==
The ERA has the ability to operate under manual control, as well as automatically or semi-automatically. The autonomy of the arm allows for astronauts to focus on other tasks, due to being freed up from others that the ERA can cover.

Specific tasks of the ERA include:

- Installation, removal or replacement of experiment payloads
- Transferring payloads in and out of the Station through the Russian airlock
- Inspection of the Station with the use of cameras
- Handling of (external) payloads
- Support of astronauts during space walks
- Freeing cosmonauts to do other work during spacewalks

Before the cancelation of the Science Power Platform, the first task of the ERA included the assembly of solar arrays on the Russian Orbital Segment, as well as replacement of said solar arrays. Many of the arms early tasks were associated with the platform.

== Development and service history ==
=== Early design ===
Design on the European Robotic Arm started in 1985, with Fokker Space performing a study for ESA on a 10-meter (33 ft.) manipulator arm for the Hermes Space Plane, known as the Hermes Robotic Arm (HERA). It functioned similarly to the Canadarm on the American Space Shuttle; being located within the cargo bay and controlled from the cockpit. The arm was attached to the Hermes at the shoulder. Due to design problems, the Hermes cargo bay had to become a closed structure, with HERA being relocated an end structure called the Hermes Resource Module.

After the decision to cancel the Hermes program, ESA and the Russian Space Agency, in 1992, agreed to use the HERA technology to service the Mir-2 Space Station. The name was then changed to the European Robotic Arm (ERA). It was here that a control computer was added to the arm's design, as well as two new operational consoles were designed, one for a cosmonaut in EVA, and one for a cosmonaut inside the station.

The following year in 1993, Russia agreed to join in the merging of the Space Station Alpha with the Mir-2 into one International Space Station. Following this, the ERA elements of Mir-2 were adapted to the Russian segment of the station, and would act as the main assembly and servicing toll for the segment.

=== Science Power Platform ===
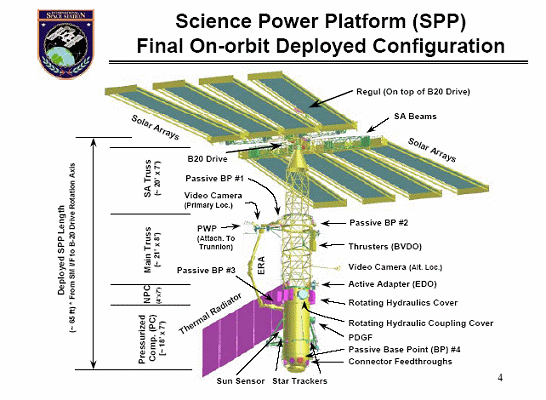
An illustration of the Science Power Platform, including the ERA. Prior to its cancellation the ERA would have launched on the SSP module.

With the shift to the ISS, the ESA and Roscosmos signed a cooperation agreement about the ERA in 1996, and would have the arm be a part of the canceled Russian Research Module, with development beginning in 1998. Following the cancellation of the Research Module ERA was moved to the Russian Science Power Platform, which would have become the base of operations for the arm. Its first mission after being relocated to its storage position would have been to install part of the solar array system. The arm would have then aided in the day-to-day needs of the station and would have seen 10 years of service.

In September 1994 the ERA System Requirements Review was completed. The completion of the review cleared the way to start full development of ERA. In early 1995 a Request of Quotation was released and six months later the DDT&E contract was signed between ESA and Fokker Space. The Preliminary Design Review for ERA was completed in 1996. Payload mass and clearance limitations resulted in ERA no longer launching with the Science Power Platform on a Proton Rocket; instead ERA was moved to a space shuttle launch.

With the change to a shuttle launch, two major changes to the ERA design were made in 1997. The first being that the joints were altered to facilitate launch on the Space Shuttle. Secondly the ERA on-board computers were switched to being based on the ESA's Data Management System. That same year also saw evaluation and review of the Man Machine Interfaces for ERA start. The inclusion of ISS astronauts and cosmonauts along with experts led to several design improvements. Manufacturing and testing of ERA engineering models also started in 1997. The electrical interface model was shipped to Russia to verify electrical interfaces between the ERA systems and elements of the Russian segment of the ISS.

1998 saw several components being delivered both to Russia and ESA. Early that year the Geometric model was sent to Russia for fit-checks and configuration analysis. The first flight equipment was also delivered to Russia, that being the grapple fixture basepoints. In March of that year the Weightless Environment Test model "WET" underwent acceptance activities at the Gagarin Cosmonaut Training Centre. In May 2000, all major components of the ERA were delivered to Fokker Space allowing for the start of the assembly, integration and test program at the flat-floor test facility. Construction of the ERA was finished in 2001.

Originally planned to be launched in 2001 on a Space Shuttle, it was later delayed to 2002. Following further delays and launch set-backs, the launch date was left uncertain following the hold on the Space Shuttle program due to the Space Shuttle Columbia disaster, as well as the cancelation of the Science Power Platform.

=== Nauka ===
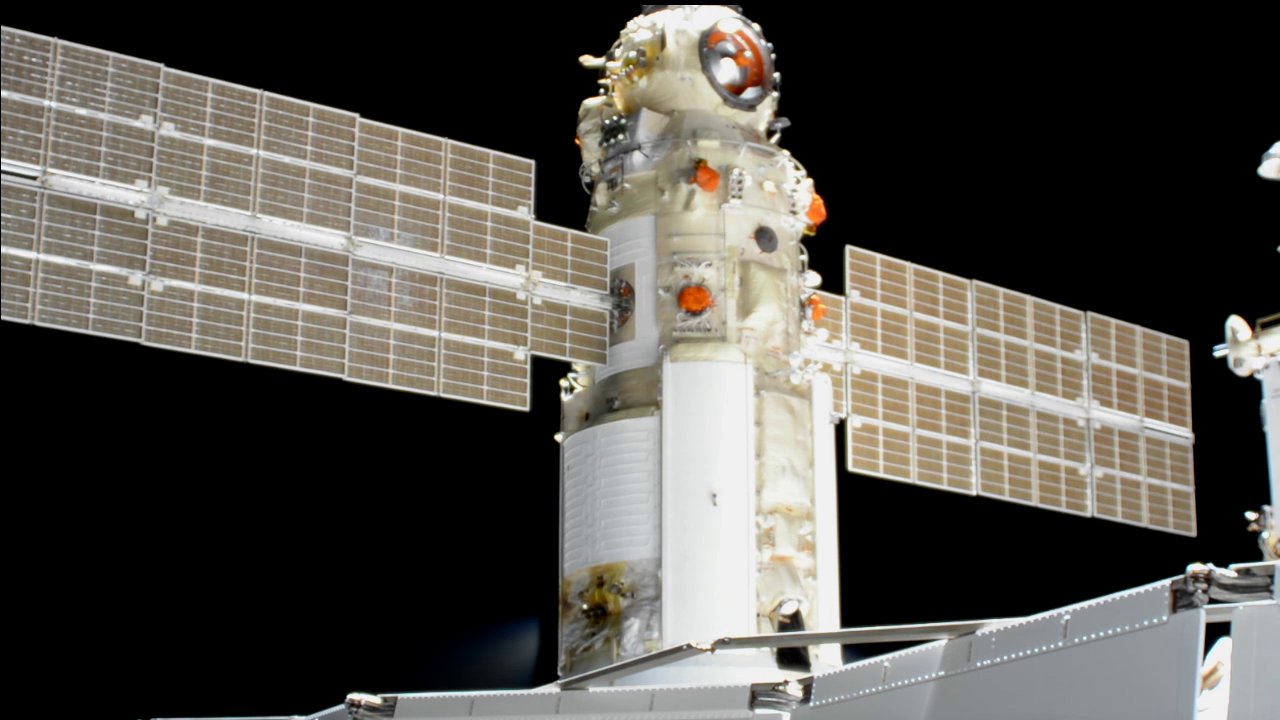
The Multipurpose Laboratory Module (MLM) Nauka after it successfully docked to the International Space Station. The European Robotic Arm is loaded on the module awaiting deployment.

In 2004, Roscosmos introduced the Multipurpose Laboratory Module Upgrade (MLM-U), also called Nauka, and proposed that the ERA could be installed, launched and operated on the module. An agreement was reached and ERA was transferred to Nauka. The Nauka module was not designed for launch on a Space Shuttle and instead would be launched on a Russian Proton rocket. The following year, ESA signed a contract with Airbus Defence and Space Netherlands to prepare the ERA to launch on a Proton rocket in November 2007.

Training of instructors was complete in 2005 with two training courses being held at ESTEC with nine Russian instructors receiving certification the following year after a refresher training course in June 2006.

In February and March 2006, the Mission Preparation and Training Equipment for the European Robotic Arm was delivered in Russia, which would be used for training to use the arm as well as preparation for both its launch and use. Equipment was also delivered to the Russian Mission Control Centre for the ISS, and would be used for mission monitoring purposes.

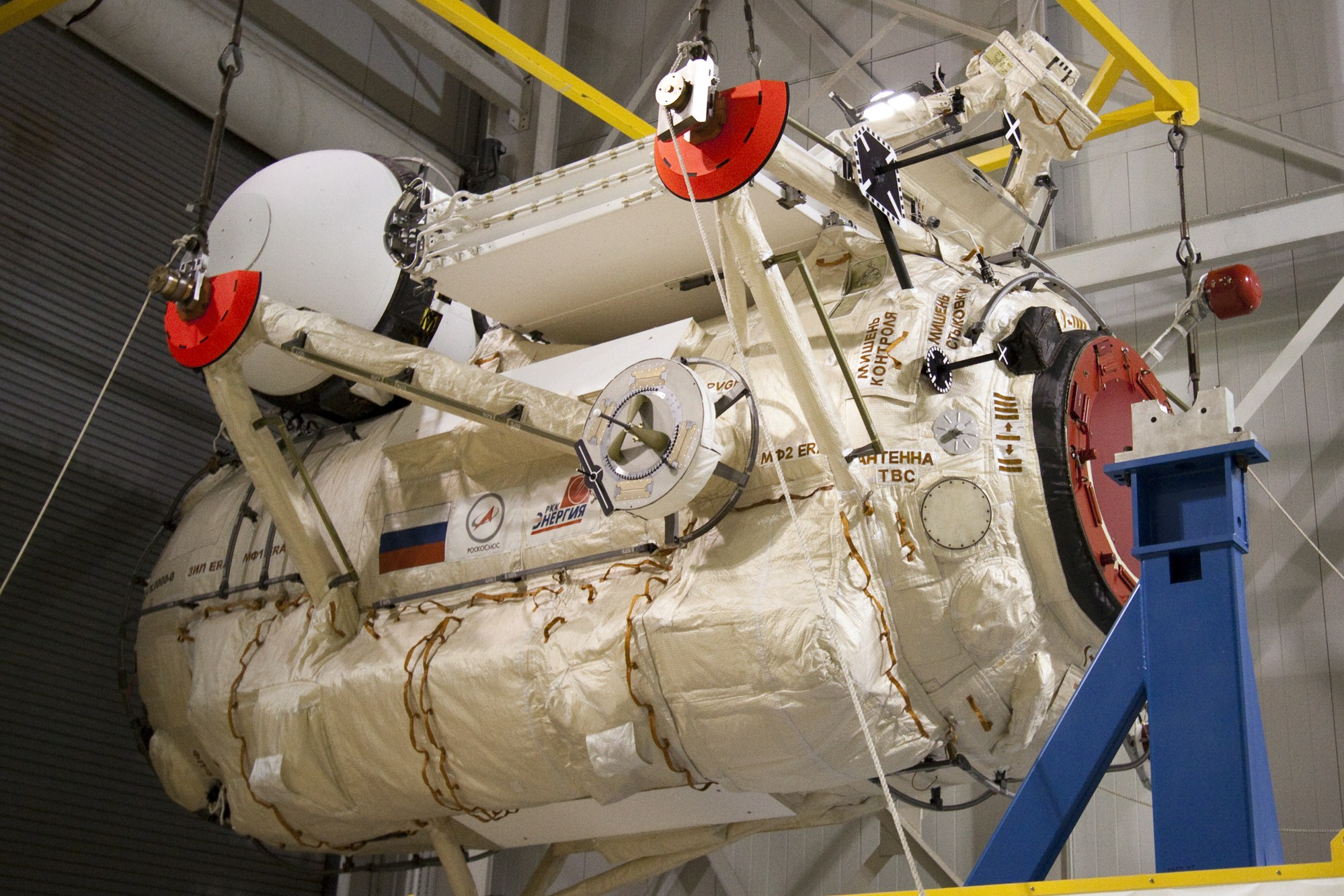
ERA spare elbow on MRM-1 below the Russian flag and Energia symbol covered under thermal blankets

Following technical issues, the launch was delayed from 2007 to 2012. In 2010, the Space Shuttle Atlantis delivered Rassvet (Mini Research Module 1) on STS-132, (as a part of an agreement with NASA) to the station, which included a spare elbow joint with 2 limbs to allow the actual to repair itself while in orbit and the Portable Work Platform for the ERA, which will be used during EVAs. Further delays resulted in the ERA launch being delayed to 2014.

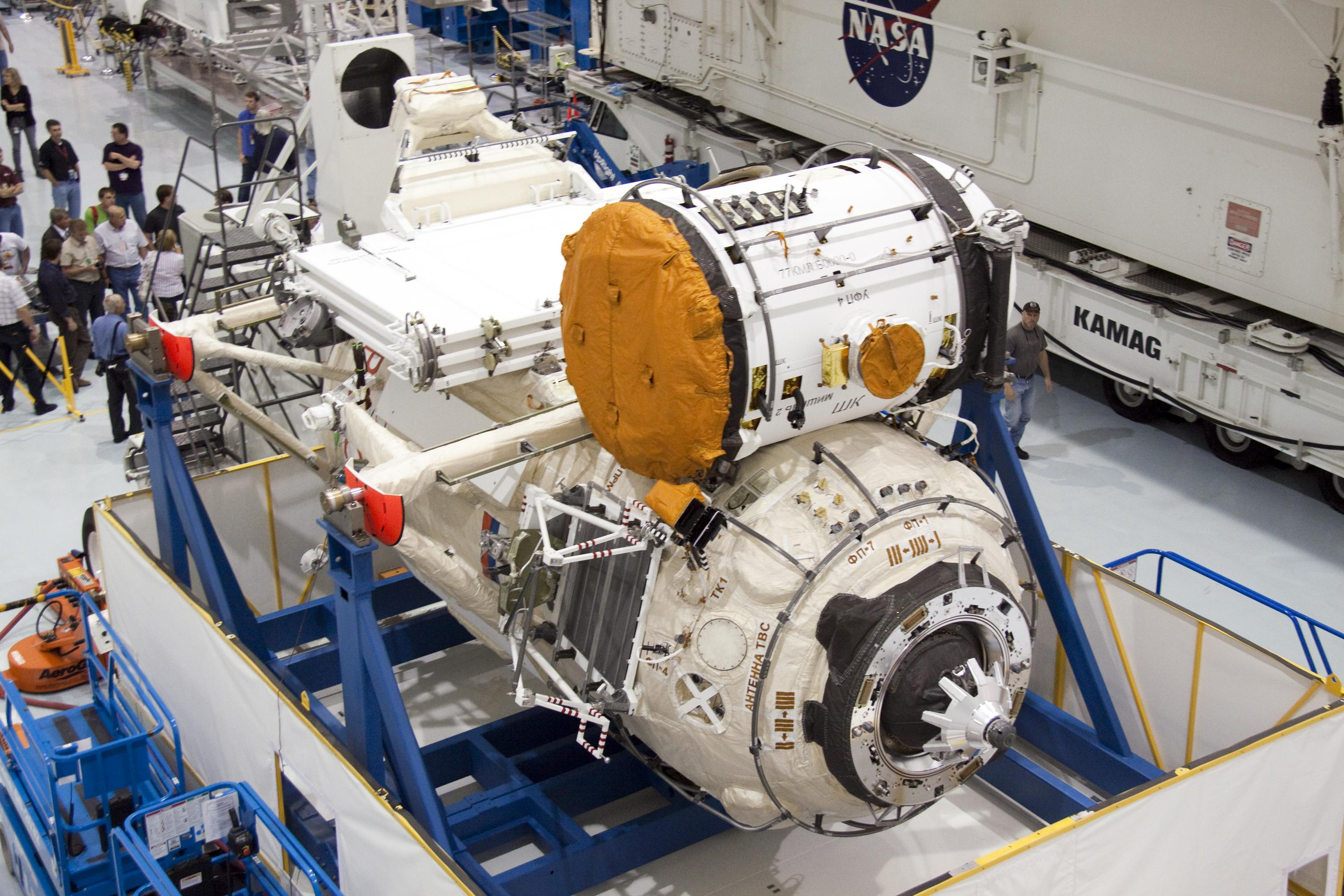
MLM outfittings on MRM-1 including the black ERA portable workpost on the left near the docking port

Due to issues in the development of the MLM module, the launch was further delayed, and the earliest it could have launched was the end of 2015. Further issues with Nauka resulted in the launch being delayed several more times until January 2021. Due to concerns over the novel coronavirus, work on the Proton rocket and Nauka was delayed, which resulted in the launch being delayed to May 2021.

In May 2020 the ERA was shipped to Baikonur for final processing. On 20 May 2021 the arm was attached to the hull of the Nauka module.

The ERA was launched on 21 July 2021 atop a Proton rocket alongside the Nauka module, 20 years after its originally planned launch and 35 years after it was first designed. It successfully docked and was attached to the station on 29 July 2021 at 13:29 UTC.

==== Launch configuration ====
The flight model of the European Robotic Arm well on display during a media day at Airbus Defence and Space Netherlands on 5 April 2006. During the day, the flight model was set up in a similar configuration to how it would be configured for launch.

During launch the ERA was located in a launch position on Nauka, referred to as the "Charlie Chaplin" configuration. During launch, both of the end effectors were grappled on to a special base point, each acting as a load suspension system. The arm was also attached to Nauka by the means of six launch fixation mechanisms. Each mechanism consisted of one or two hooks that tied down the ERA to its mounting seat, during future EVA's these hooks will be released allowing for ERA to start to prepare for operations. These attachment points are located at the elbow joint, the wrist electronic boxes and the roll joints.

=== Bringing ERA to functionality ===
Following the completion of the Nauka module being connected to the ISS via a series of cables, the ERA will be deployed. It will take five spacewalks to assemble and prepare the robotic arm to be fit for space operations. The first of these, originally scheduled for January 2022 but were delayed to 18 April 2022, will involve the removal of external covers and launch restraints, following which the ERA will be activated and undergo an In-Orbit Validation. The validation is necessary as to establish the on-orbit performance of the arm and ensure that it can perform all required function, in conjunction with the ground equipment. Following this the ERA will be thoroughly checked out to ensure that it is safe to move from its launch position to its first in-orbit home base position. Before ERA can began normal operations a series of performance tests will also be conducted. All necessary checks and assembly of ERA were originally planned to occur within 6 months of Nauka docking with the ISS but have since been pushed back. Following the performance tests an 8 weeks on-ground post analysis will be conducted on the recorded on-orbit data.

The ERA will need to be fully operational in order to proceed with the next phase of operations – which is transferring the outfittings for Nauka.

==== ERA validation operations and deployment ====
The assembly and Validation of the European Robotic Arm will be conducted in five different stages. The first part was the connecting and testing of ERA and its control interfaces, as well as conducting an initial check of the arm. This was performed on 22 September 2021 when ESA astronaut and Flight Engineer Thomas Pesquet, worked with Roscosmos cosmonaut and Flight Engineer Pyotr Dubrov in Nauka to configure the ERA controller hardware and software. During testing the ERA laptop, external control panel and the Russian control computer were shown to being working well, and able to communicate with each other but initial tests showed glitches in data transmission between Zvezda and Nauka which could cause delays to ERA deployment. Communication links between the ISS, Russian Mission Control Centre, and the European Robotic Arm Support center in the Netherlands were successfully tested. Initial checks also included the validation of the external Man Machine Interface and that the ERA can communicate properly while connected to a base point located on the outside of the ISS. To validate the MMI an EVA was required.

On 18 April the first in a series of space walks was conducted by cosmonauts Oleg Artemyev and Denis Matveev; taking seven hours to complete. During the EVA the EVA-MMI was installed the outside of the station and subsequently conducted a diagnostic test to confirm that the panel was receiving power and in good working order. Following the completion of the installation of the EVA-MMI the cosmonauts removed covers from the arm's grapple fixtures and base plates, as well as on the elbow. Following the removal of the elbow covers handrails were installed on the arm.

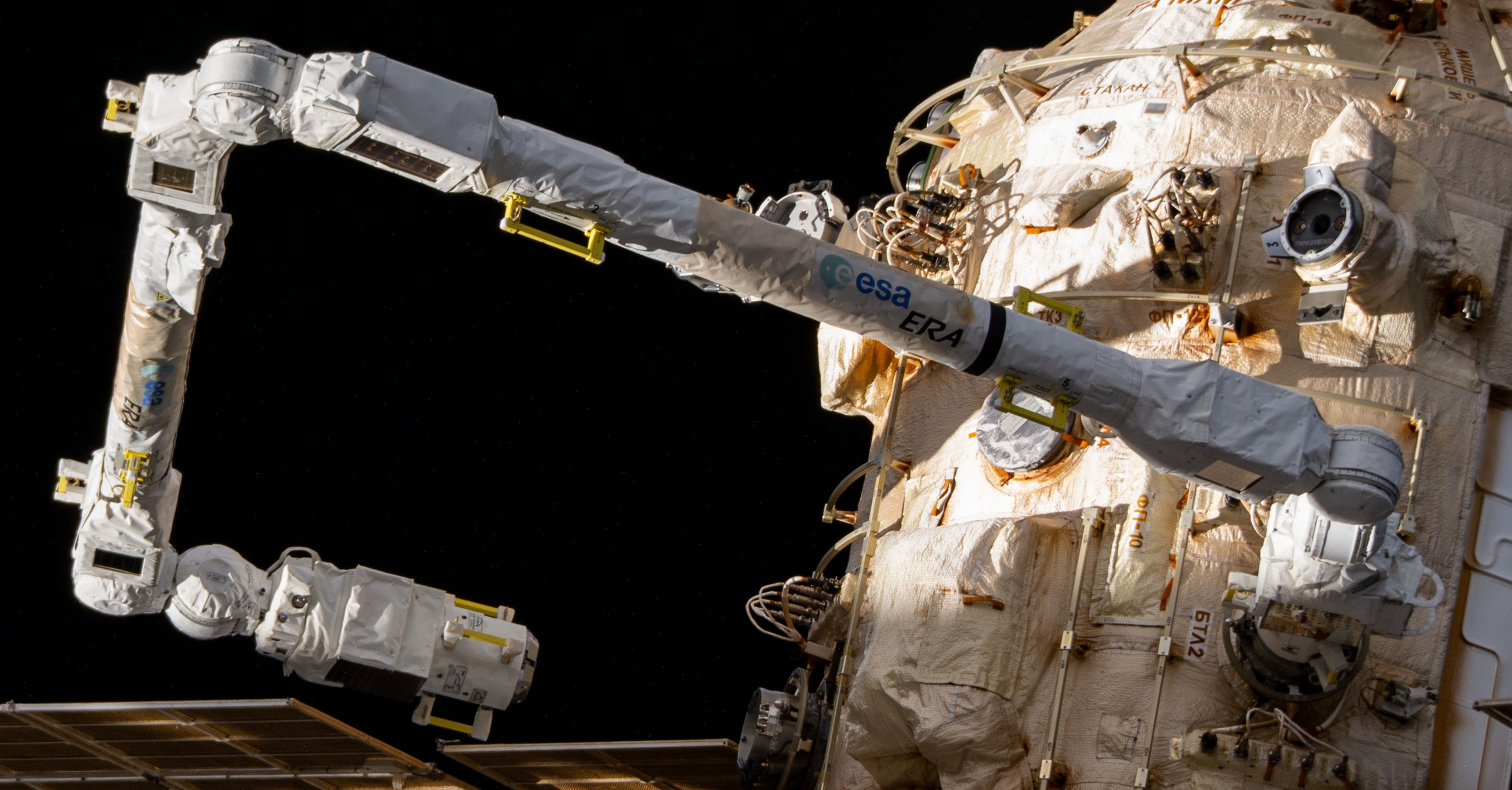
The European robotic arm is pictured extending out from the Nauka multipurpose laboratory module during a mobility test several days after Roscosmos cosmonauts Oleg Artemyev and Denis Matveev activated the ERA during a seven-hour and 42-minute spacewalk.

The second stage included the installation and validation of the ERA's transfer capabilities. During this stage both the internal and external MMI were evaluated. During an EVA an astronaut will remove the launch restraints keeping the ERA in its launch configuration as well as remove the remainder of launch covers. On 28 April 2022, the second of the series of space walks occurred, during which Artemyev and Martveev unstowed the arm from its launch position by releasing actuators enabling the arm's grip, freed additional launch locks, as well as installed handrails to ease working on and around the device. Following this the ERA was extended and commanded to attach to existing interfaces on Nauka, and moved to the forward-facing side of the module. During the EVA the arm was controlled by Sergey Korsakov. A third EVA in the series was scheduled to occur in mid-May and was performed by Oleg Artemyev and Samantha Cristoforetti.

On June 22, 2022, an attempt to connect to the BTL-3 grapple fixture was successful and perform the base command and control was changed to ERA EE1 from EE2 on BTL-2 fixtures.

During this stage, EVA cameras were installed by an astronaut, which are located on the wrist and elbow joint of the ERA. Following the completion of the EVAs needed on the ERA, joint tests were carried out, followed by multiple joint tests. Following the completion of these tests, the ERA was relocated by grappling base points on the surface of the ISS and was checked by being commanded to grapple and relocate the Portable Work Platform. The portable work platform launched with the spare elbow joint on MRM-1 in 2010 can attach to the end of the ERA to allow cosmonauts to ride on the end of the arm during spacewalks. Upon completion the ERA was placed in hibernation mode.

The third stage was the brakes run-in, thermal validation and imaging quality checks. This had the brakes run-in so that they function correctly to manipulate heavy payloads. As well thermal parameters were monitored inside the ERA at different points. Finally the ERA cameras were evaluated under different lighting conditions, and included the accuracy in proximity targeting by the end effector cameras as well as image quality.

The final two stages of preparation of the ERA for full operation was checking its motion performance as well the procession of data on the ground. After completion of all five stages of the In-Orbit Validation to a satisfactory level, the ERA validation ended, and the ERA system was considered ready for operational use.

==== Commissioning of ERA portable workpost ====
A portable work platform sent to ISS along with Rassvet was also transferred over as the last MLM-outfitting in August 2023 during VKD-60 spacewalk, which can attach to the end of the ERA to allow cosmonauts to "ride" on the end of the arm during spacewalks. This completed the ERA outfitting tasks.

== Mission Preparation and Training Equipment ==
Mission Preparation and Training Equipment (MPTE) are tools and facilities developed by National Aerospace Laboratory - NLR, used in the training of astronauts and operators, supporting maintenance, as well as aiding in missions. Three identical versions of the MPTE were installed at Rocket-Space Corporation Energia RSC/E, the Russian Mission Control Centre for the ISS, the Gagarin Cosmonaut Training Center (GCTC), as well as the European Space Research and Technology Centre (ESTEC). Both the arm and the MPTE had to be designed to be able to function and operate for a minimum of 10 years.

In February and March 2006, the MPTE was delivered to several locations in Russia. Due to the delays in the launch, much of the hardware in the computer systems had surpassed its expected life span. As a result, it had become hard to maintain the computers in the MPTE as spare parts were becoming obsolete, and hard to find. As well the ERA software maintenance facility underwent a complete upgrade to the latest software development tools at the time.

=== ERA Operation Plan ===
The MPTE is used for composing an ERA Operations Plan (EOP), based on the Mission Plan for the Russian Segment, which contains all information about the segment to plan a detailed ERA mission.

An ERA Operation Plan, in general, contains:

- ERA Actions
- Auto Sequences, the sequence of commands which will be executed automatically by the ECC
- ERA Tasks, a subset of the Auto Sequence composed of logical groups of individual commands or actions
- ERA Uplinkable Command List (EUCL), one or more auto sequences, where are ERA commands are the implementation of planned actions to control one of the ERA's subsystems

=== European Robotic Arm simulator ===
The European Robotic Arm Simulator, comprised completely of a digital simulator, that uses the EuroSim program, is designed to train astronauts to use the ERA. The simulator is set up such that an astronaut can operate a command console while standing in front of a large realistic visualization. The ERA simulator includes the reuse of existing software that was created to aid in the development of the arm itself, such as the ERA Simulator Facility, as well as existing software such as the Image Generation Subsystem of EuroSim.

==== Refresher Trainer ====
To complement the training astronauts receive on the ground, The Refresher Trainer provides the crew on board the ISS with the capability to rehearse their missions. The Refresher Trainer is a software application running on a laptop computer; it contains simulations for internal and external Man Machine Interfaces, session manager to prepare, store and replay mission sessions, as well as all relevant reference documents on the ERA. Acceptance testing on the Refresher Trainer was completed in 2006.

== Test models ==
=== Weightlessness Environment Test Model ===
Commonly referred to as the WET model, the Weightless Environment Test model was a mockup of the ERA that was located at the Gagarin Cosmonaut Training Center (GCTC), in Moscow, Russia. Attached to a mockup of Nauka, both were submerged in a large pool in the Hydrolab facility. Here it was used by astronauts, for the testing of the arm in a simulated weightless environment. Astronauts would don suites designed to mimic the conditions of wearing a spacesuit, as well as the weightless environment. The WET model was also used in the training of astronauts, including practice of the choreography of arm motion and EVA tasks.

In 2005, ESA astronaut André Kuipers and his colleague Dimitry Verba, conducted the first trial on the arm. This involved assembling the arm in the weightless environment, and was used to make recommendations of changes to the final arm, before its launch in 2021.

=== Additional models ===
In addition to the WET model of the ERA, several other models were used in testing. The Geometric Model was used in testing the geometric fit of the ERA on its launch interface, as well as in critical operational situations. The mass and stiffness model (MSM) was used to test the arm in a vibration test in the launch configuration. Other models included the thermal and structural models, as well as the Engineering Qualification Model; all used in testing and validation of the ERA's systems and structure.

== Other robotic systems at the ISS ==
The International Space Station features numerous additional robotic arms and robotic systems, which serve many different functions. The first of these is the Space Station Remote Manipulator System, more commonly known as the Canadarm2. The Canadarm2 uses the PDGF grapple fixtures on the US Orbital segment, and since they are different from the grapple fixtures on the Russian segment, the arm is unable to be used on the segment, except for the Zarya module. Alongside the Canadarm2 is the Special Purpose Dexterous Manipulator, also known as "Dextre" or "Canada hand". Dextre has two robotic arms, fixed to its body, but because the Russian grapple fixtures are different, that arm and Dextre can only be used on the Zarya module of the Russian segment since a PDGF was installed in 2011 during STS-134.

An additional arm is fixed on the Japanese Experiment Module, the Remote Manipulator System (JEM-RMS), also known as Kibō. The arm was added to the station during STS-124. The arm uses a similar PDGF grapple fixture to Canadarm2, but is primarily used to service the JEM Exposed Facility.

Because all Russian and European spacecraft dock automatically there is no need to manipulate spacecraft on the Russian segment so it is not necessary for ERA to be as large or handle as large of loads as Canadarm2.

Originally connected to Pirs, the ISS also has two Strela cargo cranes. One of the cranes could be extended to reach the end of Zarya. The other could extend to the opposite side and reach the end of Zvezda. The first crane was assembled in space during STS-96 and STS-101. The second crane was launched alongside Pirs itself. The cranes were later moved to the docking compartment Poisk and Zarya module.

=== Comparison with Canadarm2 ===
The Canadarm2 is a large robotic arm on the US Orbital Segment of the station. Due to the similarities between the ERA and the Canadarm2 a comparison can be made between the two. Both arms perform Station maintenance, are able to move supplies and equipment, inspection of the station, as well as aid astronauts during spacewalks. Where they differ is that the ERA is able to function completely automatically or semi-automatically, as well be directed either from inside or outside the station. The Canadarm2 has to be controlled by a human, whether that be by astronauts on board the ISS or be a ground team at the CSA headquarters or NASA The ERA is less powerful and smaller than the Canadarm2 as it is not required to dock spacecraft with the station. Due to the difference between the grapple fixtures between the ROS and the USOS of the station, the Canadarm2 is only able to operate on the USOS while the ERA is only able to operate on the ROS. Both arms are able to move around from point to point, end-over-end on the station, with them being able to self-relocate.

The ERA is 11.3 m (37 ft) in length, 6.3 m (21 ft) shorter than the Canadarm2 which is 17.6 m (58 ft) in length. The ERA is also lighter by 1,170 kg (2,580 lb), with the arm being 630 kilograms (1,390 lb) as opposed to the Canadarm2's 1,800 kg (4,000 lb). The maximum payload mass of the ERA is 8,000 kg (18,000 lb), as opposed to the Canadarm2's maximum payload mass at 116,000 kg (256,000 lb).

== Gallery ==
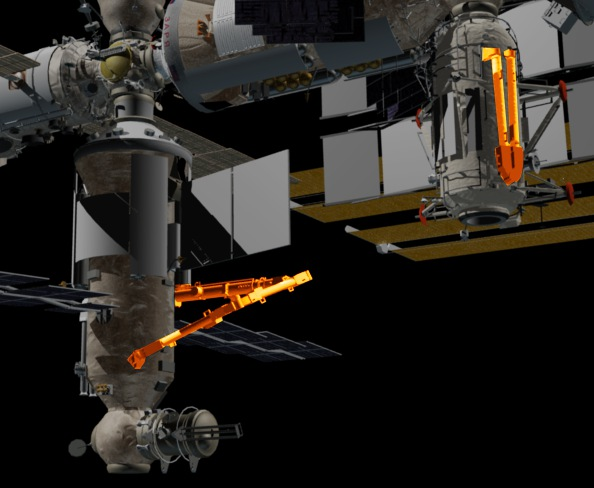
The European Robotic Arm is shown on the left attached to Nauka, the spare elbow joint with 2 limbs is shown on the right, attached to Rassvet

European Robotic Arm Mission Launch Logo

== See also ==
- Canadarm, which was used on the Space Shuttle
- Mobile Servicing System (MSS), also known by its primary component the Canadarm2, used on the ISS
- The Japanese Remote Manipulator System, used on the ISS JEM module Kibo
- Sample Transfer Arm – European robotic arm for space exploration
