= Rassvet (ISS module) =

Component of the International Space Station (ISS)

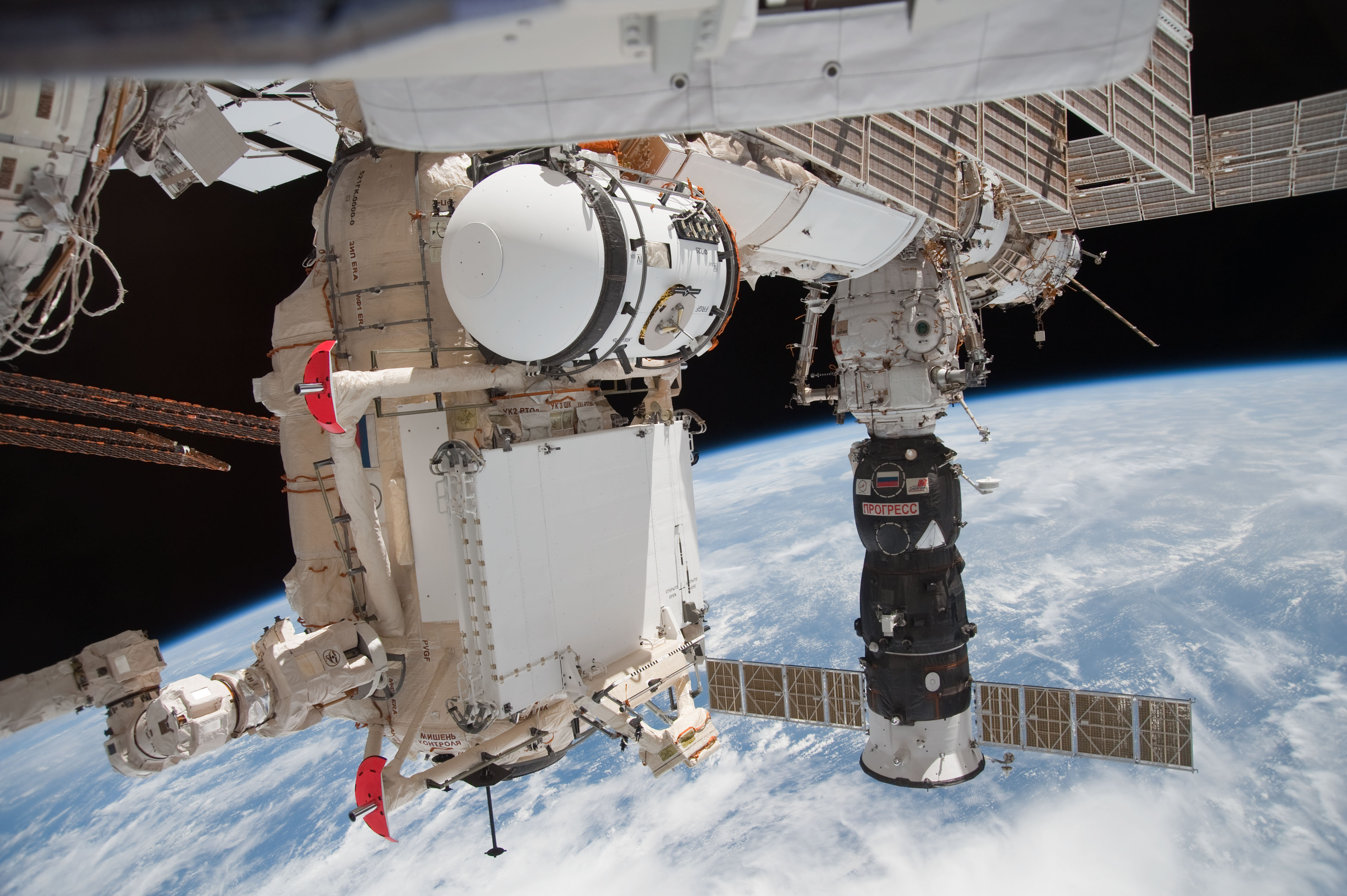
- Rassvet as seen from the Cupola module during STS-132 with a Progress in the lower right

Module statistics
- Part of: International Space Station
- Launch date: 14 May 2010, 18:20:09 UTC
- Launch vehicle: Space Shuttle Atlantis
- Berthed: 18 May 2010, 12:20 UTC (Zarya nadir)
- Mass: 5,075 kg (11,188 lb)
- Length: 6 m (20 ft)
- Diameter: 2.35 m (7 ft 9 in)
- Pressurised volume: Total: 17.4 m^{3} (610 cu ft); Pressurised: 5.85 m^{3} (207 cu ft)

Rassvet (Russian: Рассвет, lit. 'first light'), also known as the Mini-Research Module 1 (MRM 1, Russian: Малый исследовательский модуль 1) and formerly known as the Docking Cargo Module, is a component of the International Space Station (ISS). The module's design is similar to the Mir Docking Module launched on STS-74 in 1995. Rassvet is primarily used for cargo storage and as a docking port for visiting spacecraft. It was flown to the ISS aboard Space Shuttle Atlantis on the STS-132 mission on 14 May 2010, and was connected to the ISS on 18 May 2010. The hatch connecting Rassvet with the ISS was first opened on 20 May 2010. On 28 June 2010, the Soyuz TMA-19 spacecraft performed the first docking with the module.

== Details ==
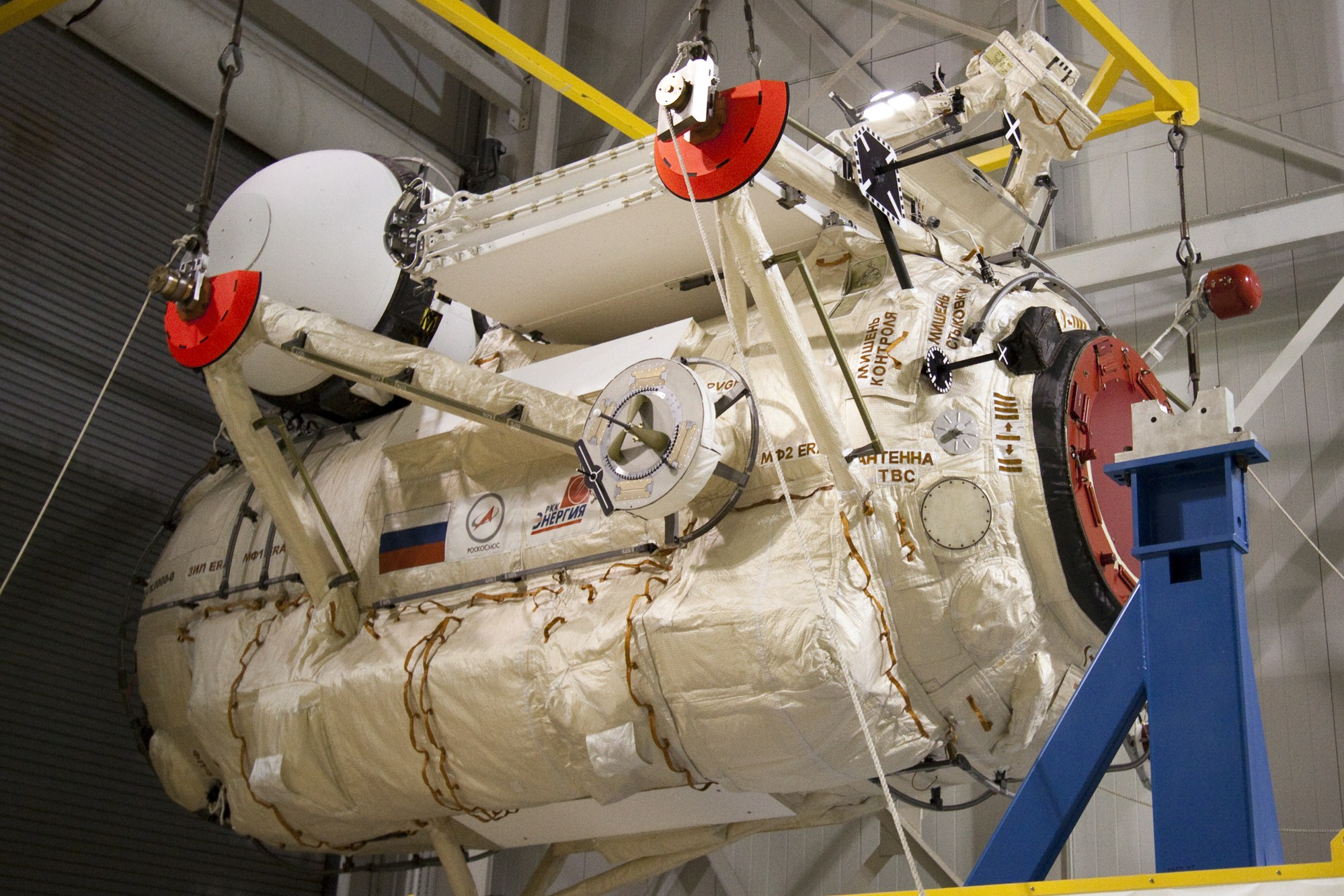
Rassvet in the Space Station Processing Facility (SSPF) at Kennedy Space Center

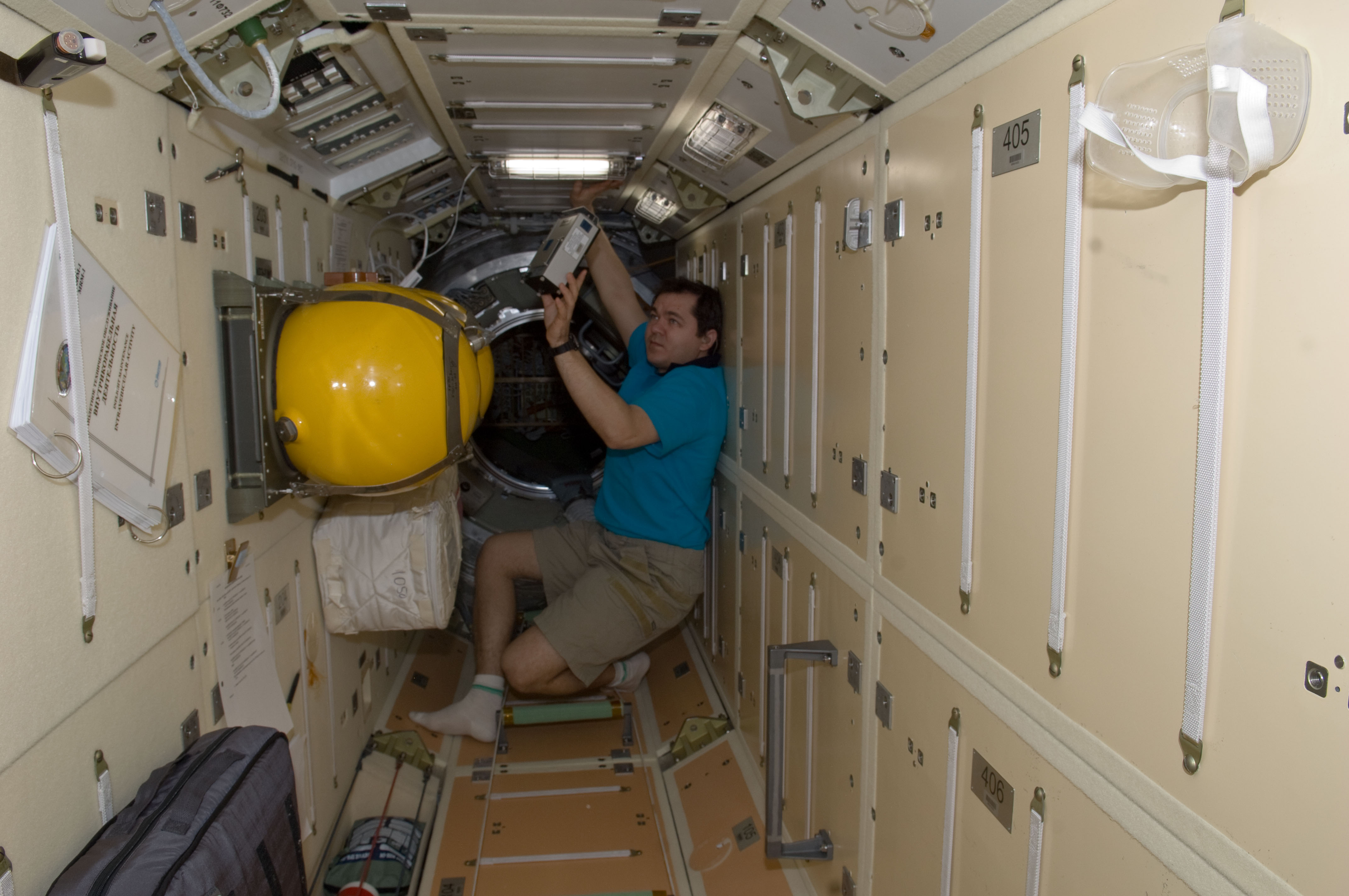
An interior view of Rassvet

Rassvet was berthed to the nadir port of Zarya with help from the Canadarm2. Rassvet carried externally attached (piggybacking) outfitting equipment for the future Nauka (Multipurpose Laboratory Module-Upgrade). That equipment included a spare elbow joint for the European Robotic Arm (ERA), an ERA portable workpost used during EVAs, heat radiator, internal hardware and Nauka's experiment airlock for launching cubesats. Delivering Rassvet thus enabled NASA to fulfill its promise to ship 1,400 kilograms (3,100 lb) to equip the Nauka.

Rassvet has two docking units: one to attach to the nadir port of the Zarya module and one to provide a docking port for a Soyuz or Progress spacecraft. It implements the role of the Docking and Storage Module from the original ISS design. Russia announced the cancellation of the last of the two planned Russian Research Modules when it announced the plans for Rassvet.

== Initial planning ==
The initial ISS plan included a Docking and Storage Module (DSM). This planned Russian element was intended to provide facilities for stowage and an additional docking port and would have been launched to the station on a Proton launch vehicle. The DSM would have been mounted to Zarya's nadir (Earth-facing) docking port. It would have been similar in size and shape to the Zarya module.

The DSM was canceled due to Russian budgetary constraints for some time, but its design was eventually modified into the Docking and Cargo Module (Rassvet) that was to be connected to the same Zarya location to provide storage space and a docking port. During the cancellation period, it was proposed that a Multi-Purpose Module (MPM) called Enterprise should be docked to Zarya, and later the Nauka was proposed to be located there as well, but the Enterprise module has since been canceled and Nauka was docked to Zvezda's nadir port instead.

== Purpose ==
Rassvet was designed as a solution to two problems facing the ISS partners:

- NASA was contracted to carry the Nauka outfitting equipment into space.
- The overlapping missions of the Progress, Soyuz, and ATV spacecraft highlighted the need to have four Russian docking ports available on the ISS. The cancellation of both Russian Research Modules meant that the ISS would be left with just three such docking ports after the installation of the Leonardo module in 2011, which made the nadir port of Zarya unusable.

Rassvet solved both of these issues. NASA did not need to add another payload flight to accommodate the Nauka outfitting equipment, as it could attach the hardware to the exterior of Rassvet.

The ISS now had four docking ports available on the Russian segment: the aft port of Zvezda, the port of Pirs, later Nauka (on the nadir port of Zvezda), the port of Poisk (on the zenith port of Zvezda), and the port on Rassvet (on the nadir port of Zarya). Russia's cancellation of the Research Module thus became less consequential for the ISS program as a whole.

== Design and construction ==
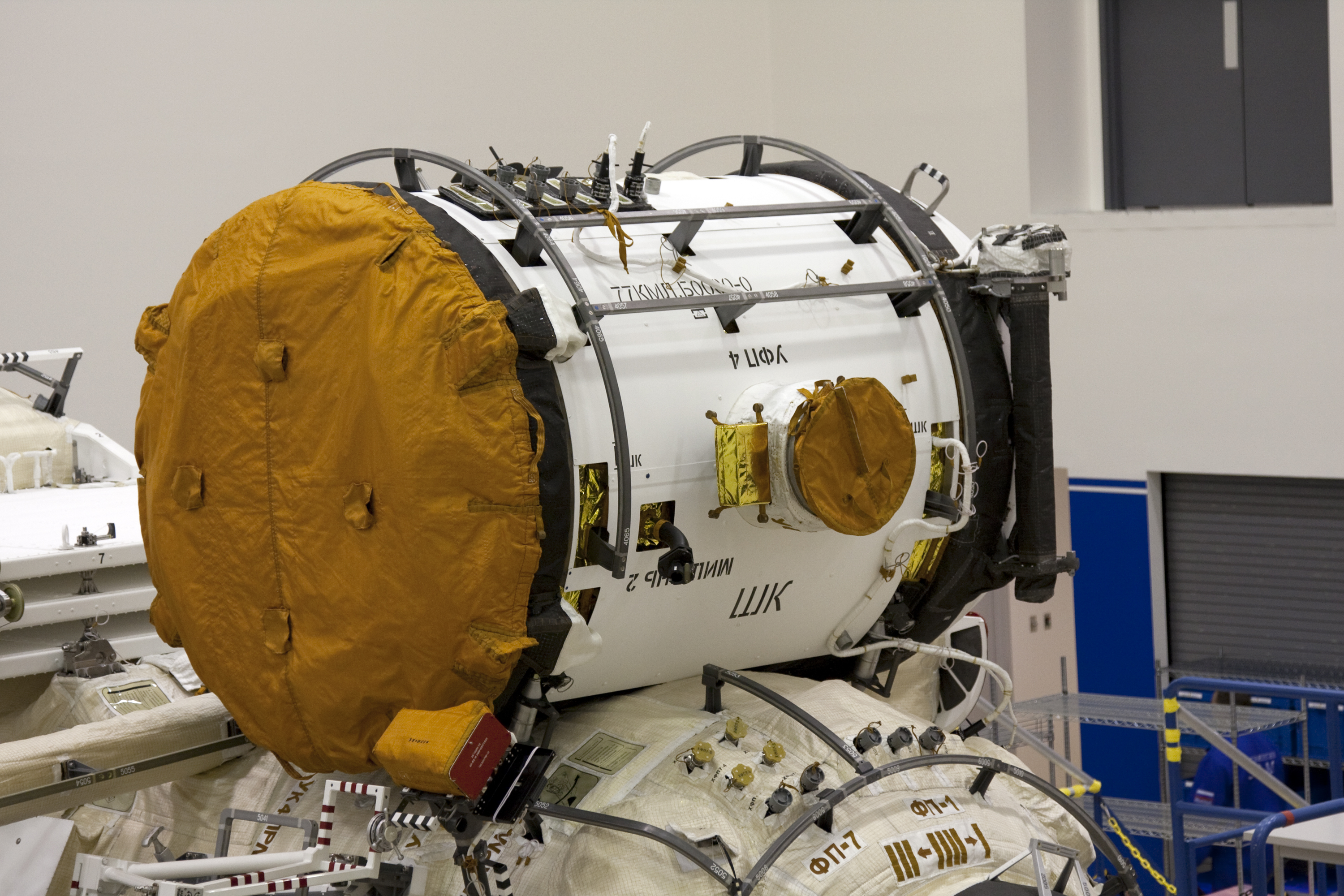
The experiment airlock for the Nauka module seen attached to the Rassvet module for launch

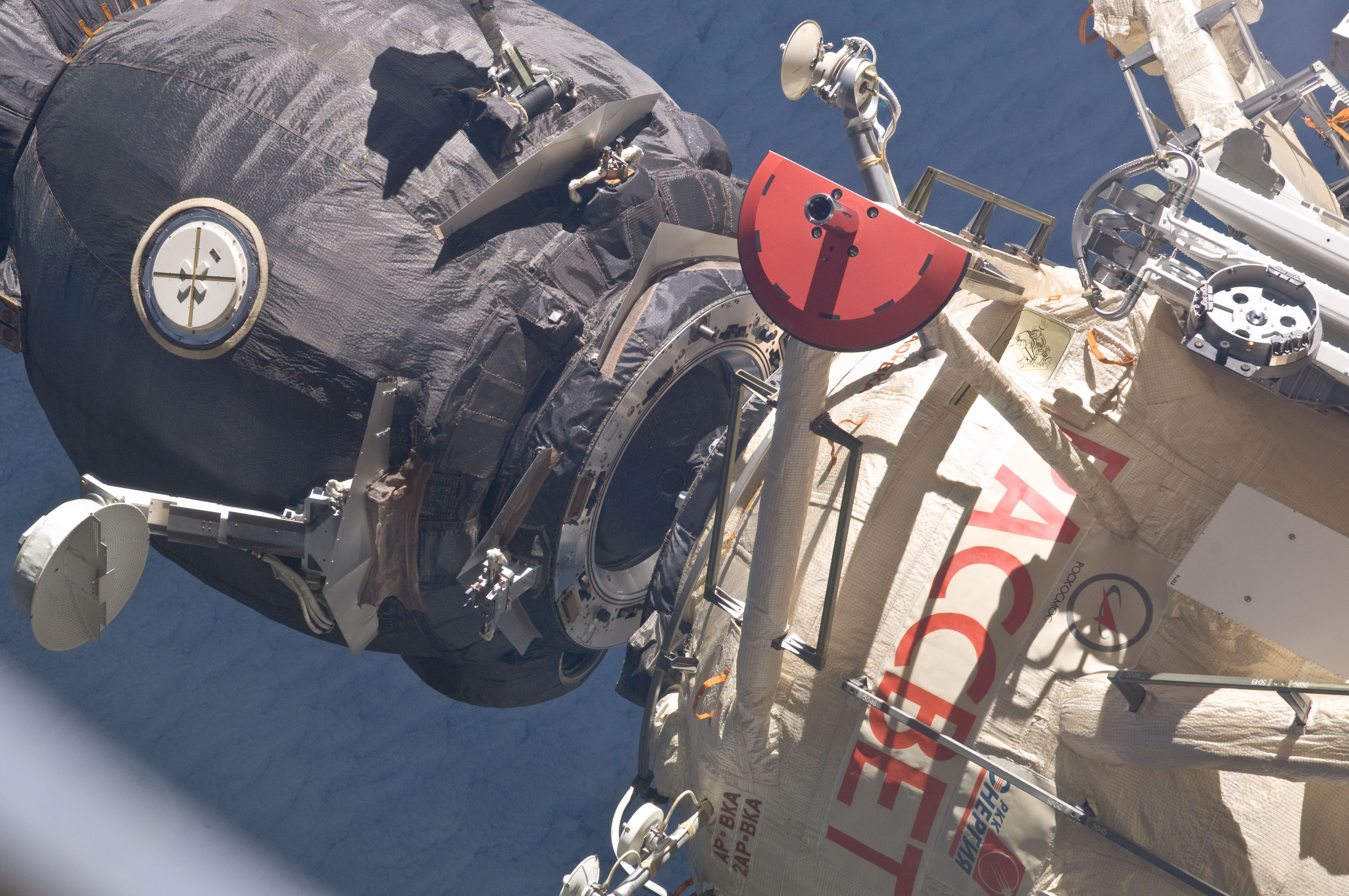
The Soyuz TMA-19 spacecraft docks to Rassvet

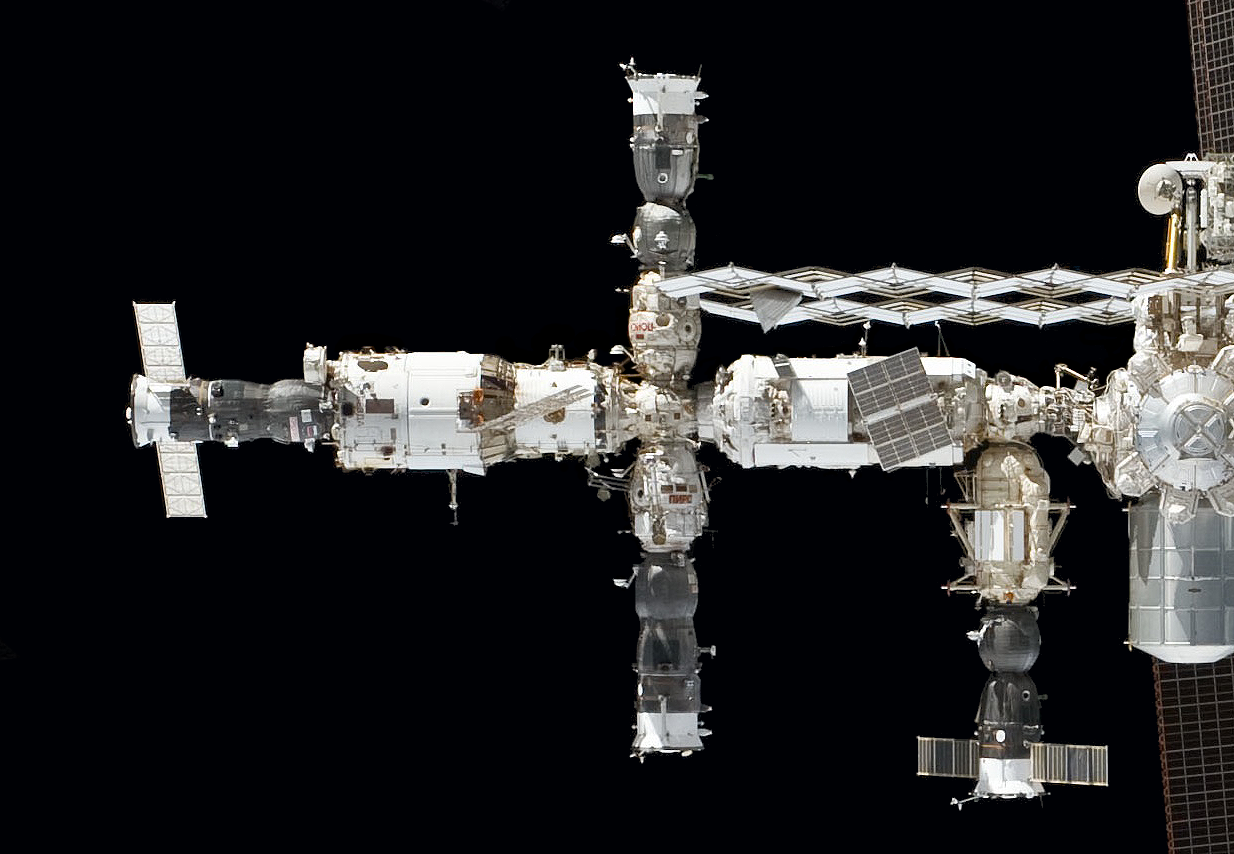
The Russian Orbital Segment as seen from the departing STS-135 in July 2011 with (clockwise from left) a Russian Progress uncrewed vehicle, two Soyuz crewed spacecraft, and an additional Progress vehicle currently docked. Viewing from starboard, facing to port, with zenith upwards, Rassvet can be seen attached to the nadir of Zarya.

The module was designed and built by Energia, from the already-made pressurized hull of the mock-up for dynamic tests of the cancelled Science Power Platform.

On 17 December 2009, an Antonov An-124 carrying the Rassvet Module and ground process equipment arrived at the Kennedy Space Center in Florida. Upon unloading, the equipment was delivered to a prelaunch processing facility run by the Astrotech. Energia specialists and technicians continued their work on the processing of the Rassvet module at the facility, completing stand-alone electrical tests and leak tests of the module and the airlock. They also prepared the airlock and the radiative heat exchanger for installation onto Rassvet. The module was moved to NASA's Space Station Processing Facility on 2 April 2010. After completing the final touches, it was placed into the shuttle payload transporter on 5 April 2010. The payload canister containing the Rassvet Module arrived at LC-39A on 15 April 2010.

Engineers at Launch Pad 39A preparing Space Shuttle Atlantis had noticed paint peeling from the Rassvet module. Although the problem was declared to have no impact on the operation of Rassvet, it posed a potential threat of releasing debris on orbit.

== Visited spacecraft ==
Rassvet was connected to nadir port of Zarya on 18 May 2010. All visiting spacecraft have launched from Baikonur Cosmodrome.

Spacecraft	Launch (UTC)	Launch vehicle	Launch pad	Docking	Undocking	Deorbit	Remarks
Soyuz TMA-19	15 June 2010; 21:35	Soyuz-FG	Site 1/5	28 June 2010; 03:38	26 November 2010; 01:23	26 November 2010; 04:46	ISS-23S. Had been docked to Zvedza since 17 June 2010 after delivering Expedition 24 crew.
Soyuz TMA-20	15 December 2010; 19:09	Soyuz-FG	Site 1/5	17 December 2010; 20:12	23 May 2011; 21:35	24 May 2011; 02:27	ISS-25S delivering Expedition 25 crew.
Soyuz TMA-02M	7 June 2011; 20:12	Soyuz-FG	Site 1/5	9 June 2011; 21:18	21 November 2011; 23:00	22 November 2011; 02:26	ISS-27S delivering Expedition 28 crew.
Soyuz TMA-03M	21 December 2011; 13:!6	Soyuz-FG	Site 1/5	23 December 2011; 15:19	1 July 2012; 04:48	1 July 2012; 08:14	ISS-29S delivering Expedition 30 crew.
Soyuz TMA-05M	15 July 2012; 02:40:03	Soyuz-FG	Site 1/5	17 July 2012; 04:51	18 November 2012; 22:26	19 November 2012; 01:53:30	ISS-31S delivering Expedition 32 crew.
Soyuz TMA-07M	19 December 2012; 12:12:36	Soyuz-FG	Site 1/5	21 December 2012; 14:09	13 May 2013; 23:08	14 May 2013; 02:31	ISS-33S delivering Expedition 34 crew.
Soyuz TMA-09M	28 May 2013; 20:31:24	Soyuz-FG	Site 1/5	29 May 2013; 02:10	1 November 2013; 23:26	11 November 2013; 02:49	ISS-35S delivering Expedition 36 crew. Translated to Zvedza after undocking.
Soyuz TMA-11M	7 November 2013; 04:14:15	Soyuz-FG	Site 1/5	7 November 2013; 10:27	13 May 2014; 22:36	14 May 2014; 01:58	ISS-37S delivering Expedition 38 crew.
Soyuz TMA-13M	28 May 2014; 19:57:41	Soyuz-FG	Site 1/5	29 May 2014; 19:57	10 November 2014; 00:31	10 November 2014; 03:58	ISS-39S delivering Expedition 40 crew.
Soyuz TMA-15M	23 November 2014; 21:00:14	Soyuz-FG	Site 1/5	24 November 2014; 02:49	11 June 2015; 10:20	11 June 2015; 13:44	ISS-41S delivering Expedition 42 crew.
Soyuz TMA-17M	22 July 2015; 21:02:45	Soyuz-FG	Site 1/5	23 July 2015; 02:45	11 December 2015; 09:47	11 December 2015; 13:12	ISS-43S delivering Expedition 44 crew.
Soyuz TMA-19M	15 December 2015; 11:03:09	Soyuz-FG	Site 1/5	15 December 2015; 17:33:29	18 June 2016; 05:52	18 June 2016; 09:15	ISS-45S delivering Expedition 46 crew.
Soyuz MS-01	7 July 2016; 01:36	Soyuz-FG	Site 1/5	9 July 2016; 04:12	30 October 2016; 00:35	30 October 2016; 03:58	ISS-47S delivering Expedition 48 crew. Maiden flight of the Soyuz MS capsule.
Soyuz MS-03	17 November 2016; 20:17:00	Soyuz-FG	Site 1/5	19 November 2016; 21:58	2 June 2017; 10:47	2 June 2017; 14:10	ISS-49S delivering Expedition 50 crew. One crew member performed an extended-duration mission on the station and returned on Soyuz MS-04.
Soyuz MS-05	28 July 2017; 15:41	Soyuz-FG	Site 1/5	28 July 2017; 21:54	14 December 2017; 05:14	14 December 2017; 08:38	ISS-51S delivering Expedition 52 crew.
Soyuz MS-07	17 December 2017; 07:21	Soyuz-FG	Site 1/5	19 December 2017; 08:39	3 June 2018; 09:16	3 June 2018; 12:39	ISS-53S delivering Expedition 54 crew.
Soyuz MS-09	6 June 2018; 11:12:41	Soyuz-FG	Site 1/5	8 June 2018; 13:01	20 December 2018; 01:42	20 December 2018; 05:02:00	ISS-55S delivering Expedition 56 crew. On August 29, the orbital module developed an air leak after a patch job over a hole drilled in the pressure vessel failed. The hole was patched and the mission was able to continue successfully.
Soyuz MS-12	14 March 2019; 19:14:08	Soyuz-FG	Site 1/5	15 March 2019; 01:01	3 October 2019; 07:37	3 October 2019; 10:59	ISS-58S delivering Expedition 59 crew. Returned with visiting crew member launched on Soyuz MS-15.
Soyuz MS-17	14 October 2020; 05:45:04	Soyuz-2.1a	Site 31/6	14 October 2020; 08:48:43	19 March 2021; 16:38:27	17 April 2021; 04:55:07	ISS-63S delivering Expedition 63 crew. Translated to Poisk after undocking.
Soyuz MS-18	9 April 2021; 07:42:41	Soyuz-2.1a	Site 31/6	9 April 2021; 11:05	28 September 2021; 12:21	17 October 2021; 04:35:44	ISS-64S delivering Expedition 65 crew. Translated to Nauka after undocking.
Soyuz MS-19	5 October 2021; 08:55:02	Soyuz-2.1a	Site 31/6	5 October 2021; 12:22:31	30 March 2022; 07:21:03	30 March 2022; 11:28:26	ISS-66S delivering one crew member for Expedition 65. Two visiting crew members returned on Soyuz MS-18.
Soyuz MS-22	21 September 2022; 13:54:50	Soyuz-2.1a	Site 31/6	21 September 2022; 17:06:34	28 March 2023; 09:57:27	28 March 2023; 11:45:58	ISS-68S delivering Expedition 67 crew. On 15 December, an external radiator suffered a micro-meteorite impact causing a loss of coolant. This caused the capsule to be returned unmanned after Soyuz MS-23 was launched unmanned as a backup.
Soyuz MS-24	15 September 2023; 15:44:35	Soyuz-2.1a	Site 31/6	15 September 2023; 18:53:32	6 April 2024; 03:54:58	6 April 2024; 07:17:47	ISS-70S delivering Expedition 69 crew. Returned with two visiting crew members launched on Soyuz MS-25.
Soyuz MS-26	11 September 2024; 16:23:12	Soyuz-2.1a	Site 31/6	11 September 2024; 19:32:09	19 April 2025; 21:57:33	20 April 2025; 01:20:35	ISS-72S delivering Expedition 71 crew.
Soyuz MS-28	27 November 2025; 09:27:57	Soyuz-2.1a	Site 31/6	27 November 2025; 12:34:35	26 July 2026; 07:02:55	26 July 2026; 10:27:25	ISS-74S delivering Expedition 73 crew.

== Gallery ==
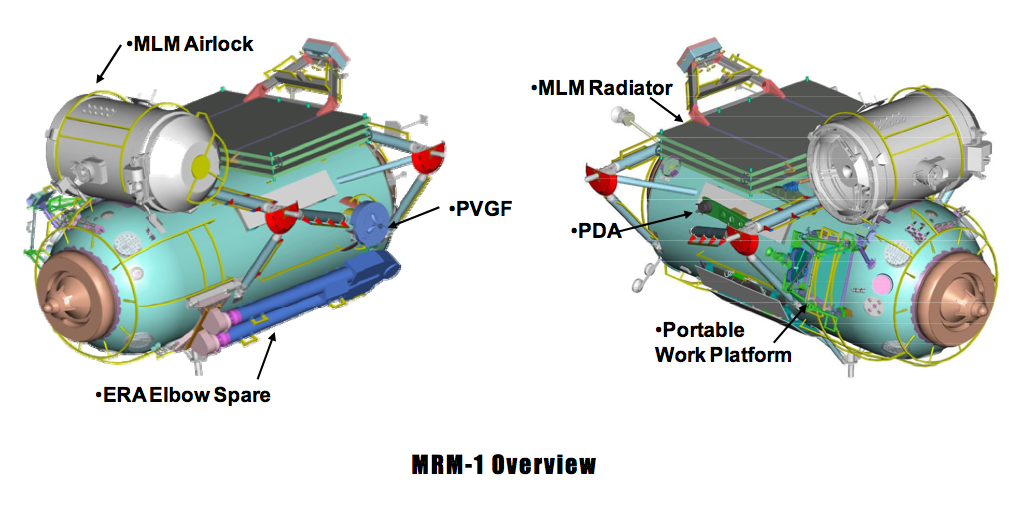
Diagram showing the Nauka components attached to Rassvet at launch

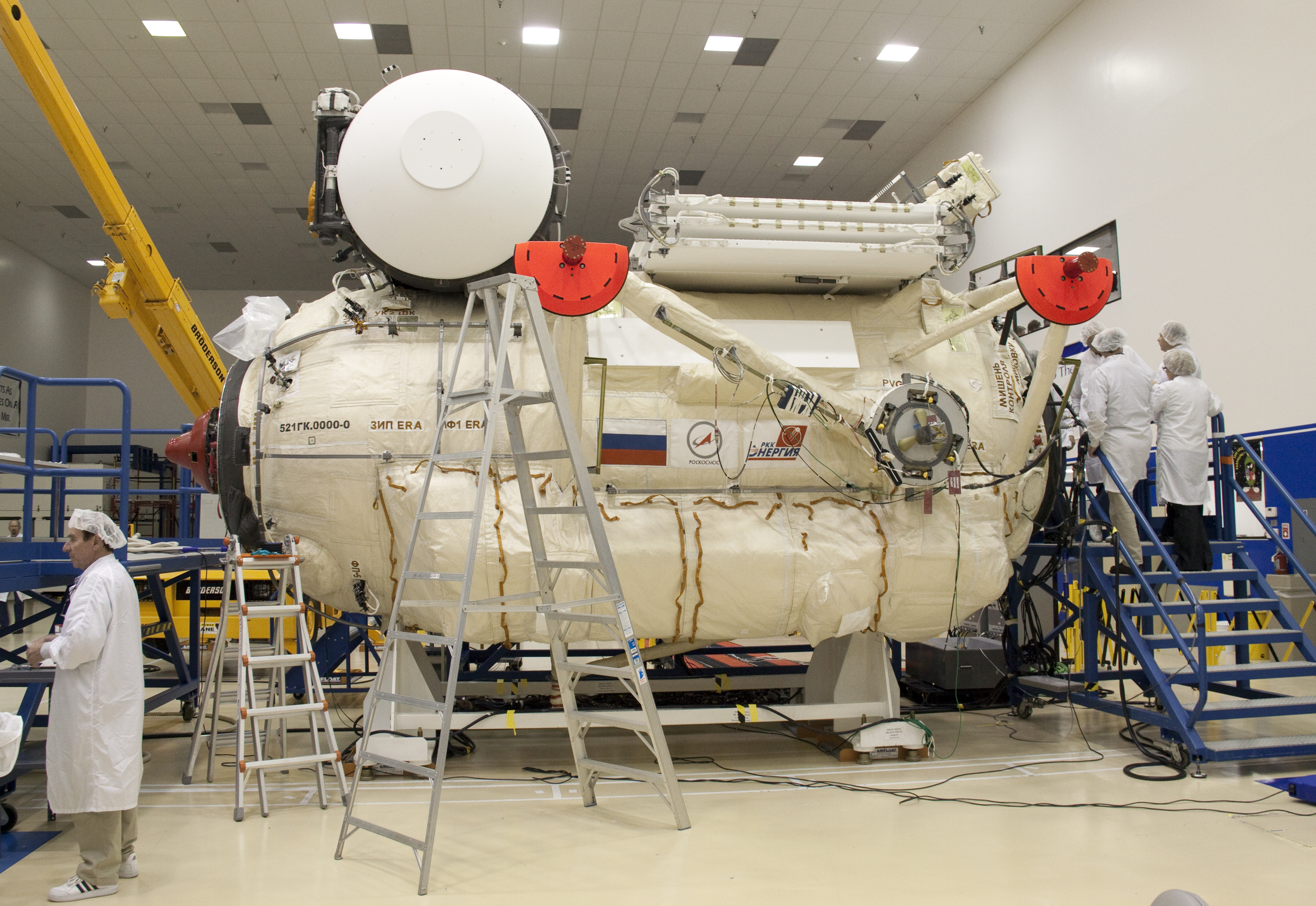
Rassvet at the Astrotech Facility

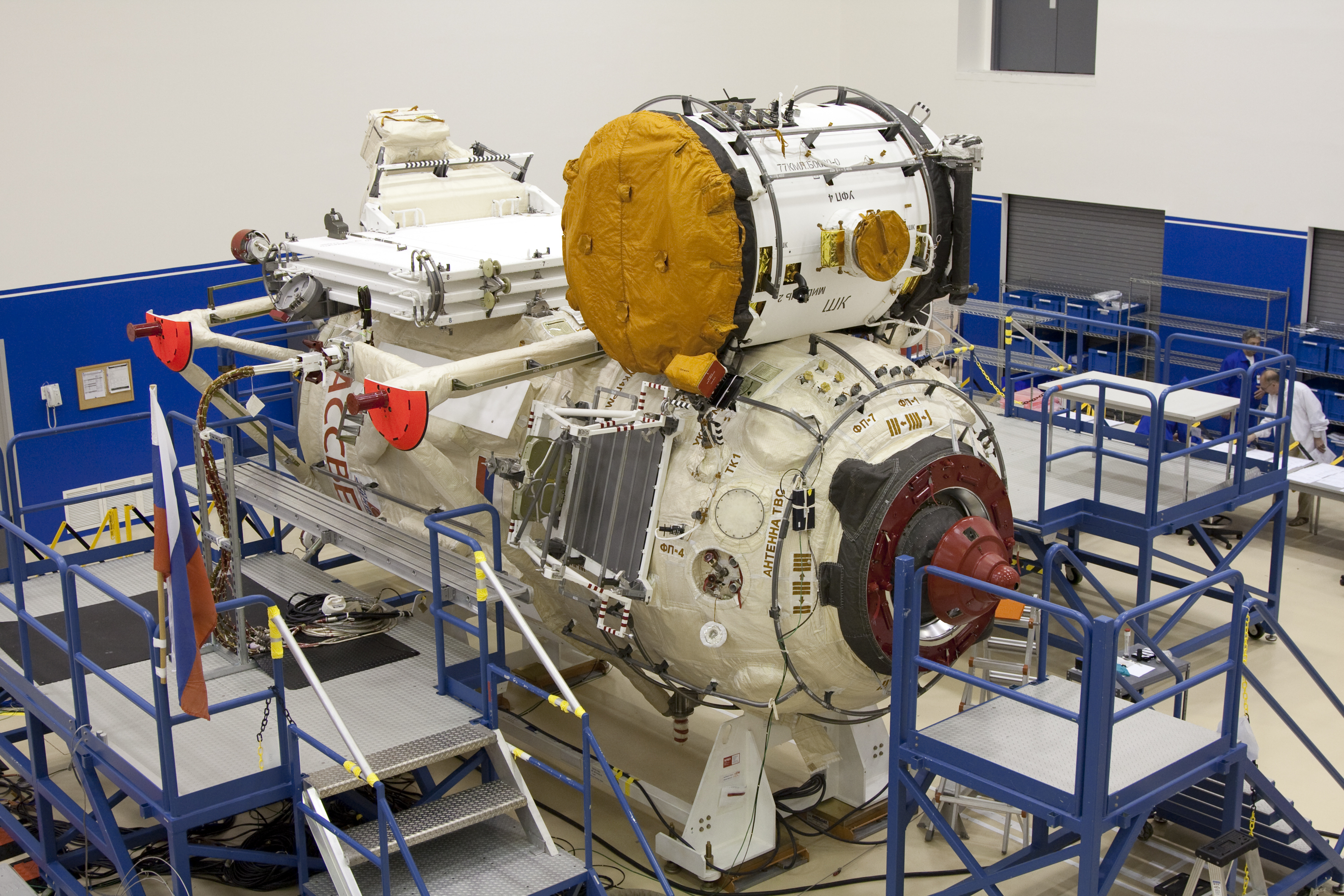
Rassvet module development

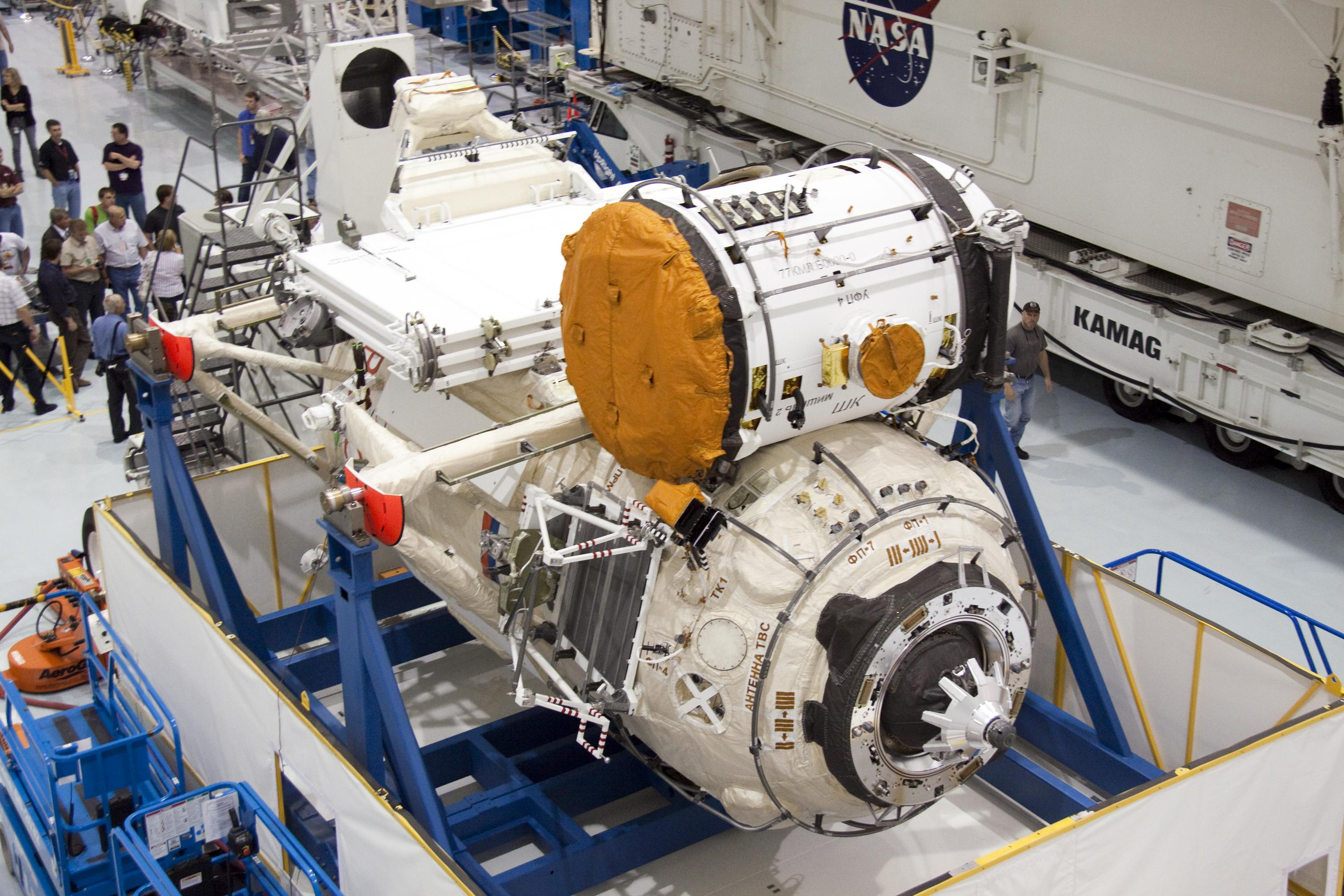
Rassvet module

== See also ==
- Poisk (ISS module)
- Pirs (ISS module)
