= Russian Research Module =

Once-proposed laboratory portion(s) of the International Space Station

The Russian Research Module (RM) was to be a Russian component of the International Space Station (ISS) that provided facilities for Russian science experiments and research.

== History ==
The original designs of ISS featured two research modules shaped like a rounded Zarya Functional Cargo Block, but Russian budget problems caused one of them along with the Universal Docking Module to be cancelled early in the program, leaving only one Research Module. This Research Module was scheduled to be built and launched in 2010 or later. In 2007 it was decided that, due to the continuing budget problems, the last Research Module was to be cancelled as well.

According to the schedule the module with scientific designation for the Russian Orbital Segment became the FGB-2 based Multipurpose Laboratory Module Nauka approved after the cancellation of the original RM1 and RM2.

Additionally the Russian Orbital Segment contains two smaller modules, initially named Mini-Research Module (MRM) 1 and 2. The MRM1 Rassvet implements the Docking and Stowage Module of the original design and is based on the canceled Science Power Platform pressurised compartment. Rassvet was launched in 2010 by STS-132 on board the Space Shuttle Atlantis by NASA. MRM2 is one of the names for the original Docking Compartment 2 module Poisk, that was canceled, but later scheduled again for 2009 launch by Progress M-MIM2.

RKK Energia, the manufacturer of the ROS components, proposes to execute a similar plan to the original ISS proposal with the addition of the nodal module Prichal in 2021 and two additional science/energy modules to the segment around the mid-2020s, though it has decided as of April 2022 to launch the modules as their own space station.
