= Science Power Platform =

Cancelled ISS module

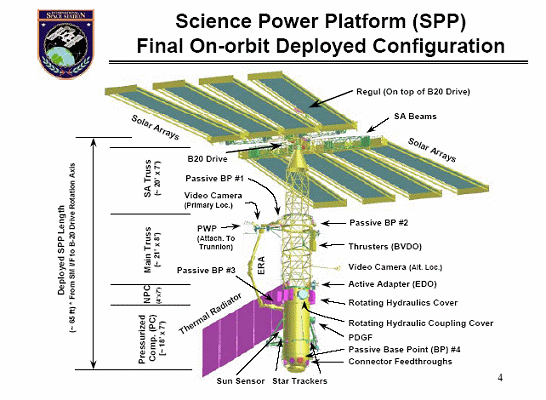
ISS Science Power Platform (NASA)

The Science Power Platform (SPP; Russian: Научно-Энергетическая Платформа, Science-Energy Platform, also known by the Russian initialism NEP) was a planned Russian element of the International Space Station (ISS) that was intended to be delivered to the ISS by a Russian Proton rocket or Zenit rocket (it was originally designed to be part of Mir-2) but was shifted to launch by Space Shuttle as part as a tradeoff agreement on other parts of the ISS.

== History ==
It would have provided additional power for the ISS as well as roll axis control capability for the orbital facility. If the Science Power Platform had been delivered to the ISS, it would have been attached to the zenith port of Zvezda, a position currently occupied by Poisk. The SPP would have had eight solar arrays and a robotic arm provided by the European Space Agency (ESA) dedicated to maintaining the SPP.

The SPP's robotic arm (European Robotic Arm) was still added and is currently a part of the station, and launched together with the Russian Nauka Multipurpose Laboratory Module on 21 July 2021, after many delays.

An agreement was reached in March 2006 by the Russians and NASA in order to provide part of the power the Russian segments need from the four American solar arrays. Originally the SPP should have made the power supply of the four Russian modules independent from the power supply of the rest of the station. The already-made pressurised hull of a static test article for this component is now being used for the Russian Mini Research Module 1, which launched on STS-132 in 2010. Rassvet is docked to the Zarya nadir port.

RKK Energia, the manufacturer of the Russian Orbital Segment components, has proposed something similar to the original ISS plan with the addition of a nodal module (with six docking ports) and two additional science/energy modules called Science Power Module 1 and 2 to the segment around 2013-2015. The Science Power Modules would perform similar functions and would have solar arrays similar to the SPP, but unlike it the truss structure would be much smaller. As of 2021, the Science Power Module(s) (unknown whether one or two modules) is still being considered, but nothing has been launched. The nodal module, named Prichal, docked to the ISS on November 26, 2021.
