= International Space Station program =

Ongoing space research program

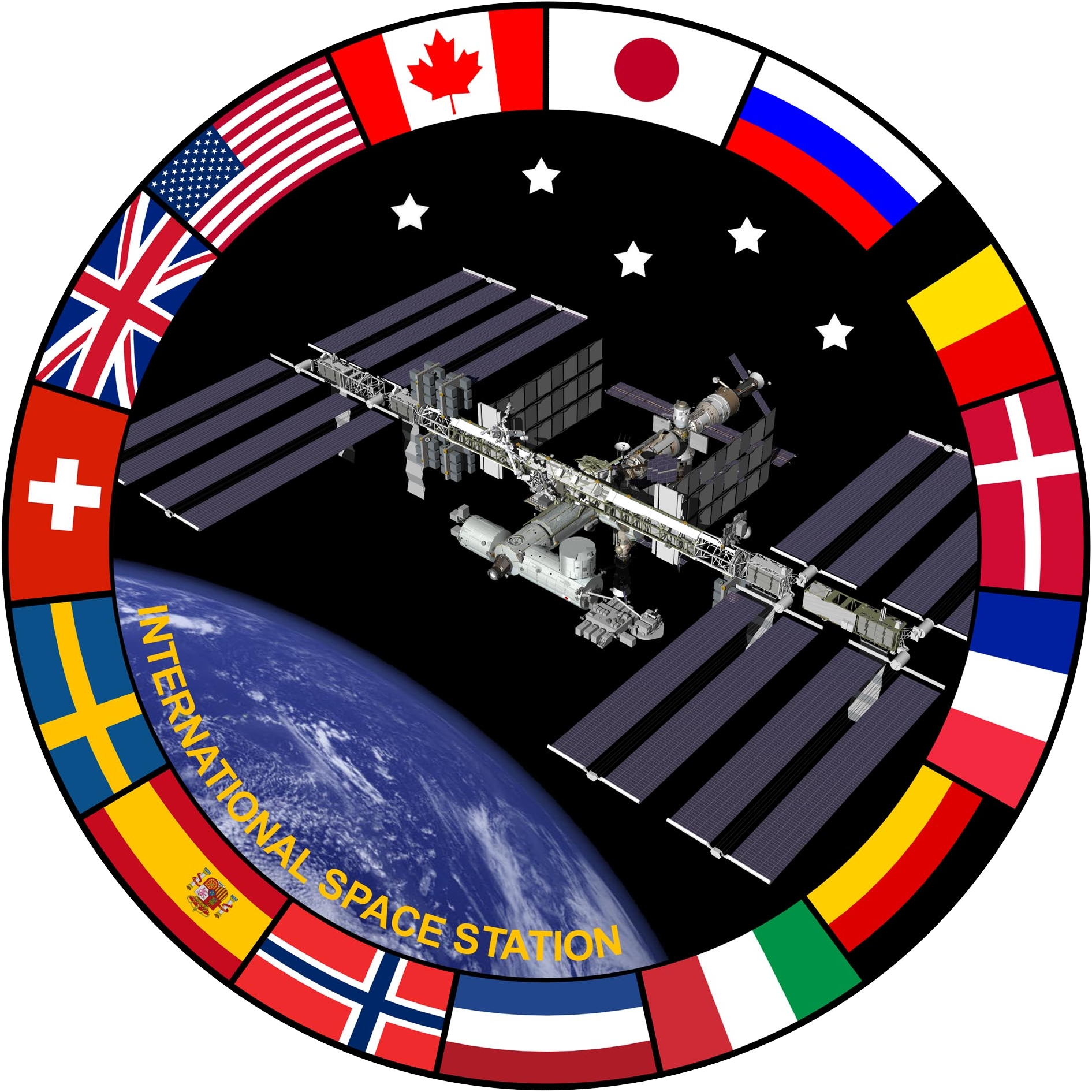
- Insignia with flags of the original signatory states

Program overview
- Organisation: Canadian Space Agency (CSA); European Space Agency (ESA); JAXA; NASA; Roscosmos
- Manager: CSA: Pierre Jean; ESA: Bernardo Patti; JAXA: Yoshiyuki Hasegawa; NASA: Joel Montalbano (2020–present); Roscosmos: Alexey Krasnov
- Status: Active

Program history
- Cost: $150 billion (2010)
- Duration: 1993–present
- First flight: Zarya; November 20, 1998
- First crewed flight: STS-88; December 4, 1998
- Launch sites: Baikonur (1998–present); Kennedy (1998–present); Cape Canaveral (2010–present); Wallops (2013–present)

Vehicle information
- Uncrewed vehicles: Progress (2000–present); ATV (2008–2015); HTV (2009–2020); Dragon (2010–2020); Cygnus (2013–present); Cargo Dragon (2020-present)
- Crewed vehicles: ISS (1998–present); Space Shuttle (1998–2011); Soyuz (2000–present); Crew Dragon (2020–present); Boeing Starliner (2024–present)
- Crew capacity: ISS: 7; Soyuz: 3; Crew Dragon: 4; Boeing Starliner: 4
- Launch vehicles: Proton (1998–present); Space Shuttle (1998–2011); Soyuz (2000–present); Falcon 9 (2010–present); Antares (2013–present); Atlas V (2015–present)

The International Space Station program is the space program of the International Space Station. It is tied together by a complex set of legal, political and financial agreements between the fifteen nations involved in the project, governing ownership of the various components, rights to crewing and utilisation, and responsibilities for crew rotation and resupply of the station.

It was conceived in September 1993 by the United States and Russia after 1980s plans for separate American (Freedom) and Soviet (Mir-2) space stations failed due to budgetary reasons. These agreements tie together the five space agencies and their respective International Space Station programs and govern how they interact with each other on a daily basis to maintain station operations, from traffic control of spacecraft to and from the station, to utilisation of space and crew time. In March 2010, the International Space Station Program Managers from each of the five partner agencies were presented with Aviation Week's Laureate Award in the Space category, and the ISS program was awarded the 2009 Collier Trophy. In 2001 the ISS partner agencies were awarded the Prince of Asturias Award (now the Princess of Asturias Awards) for International Cooperation.

== Conception ==
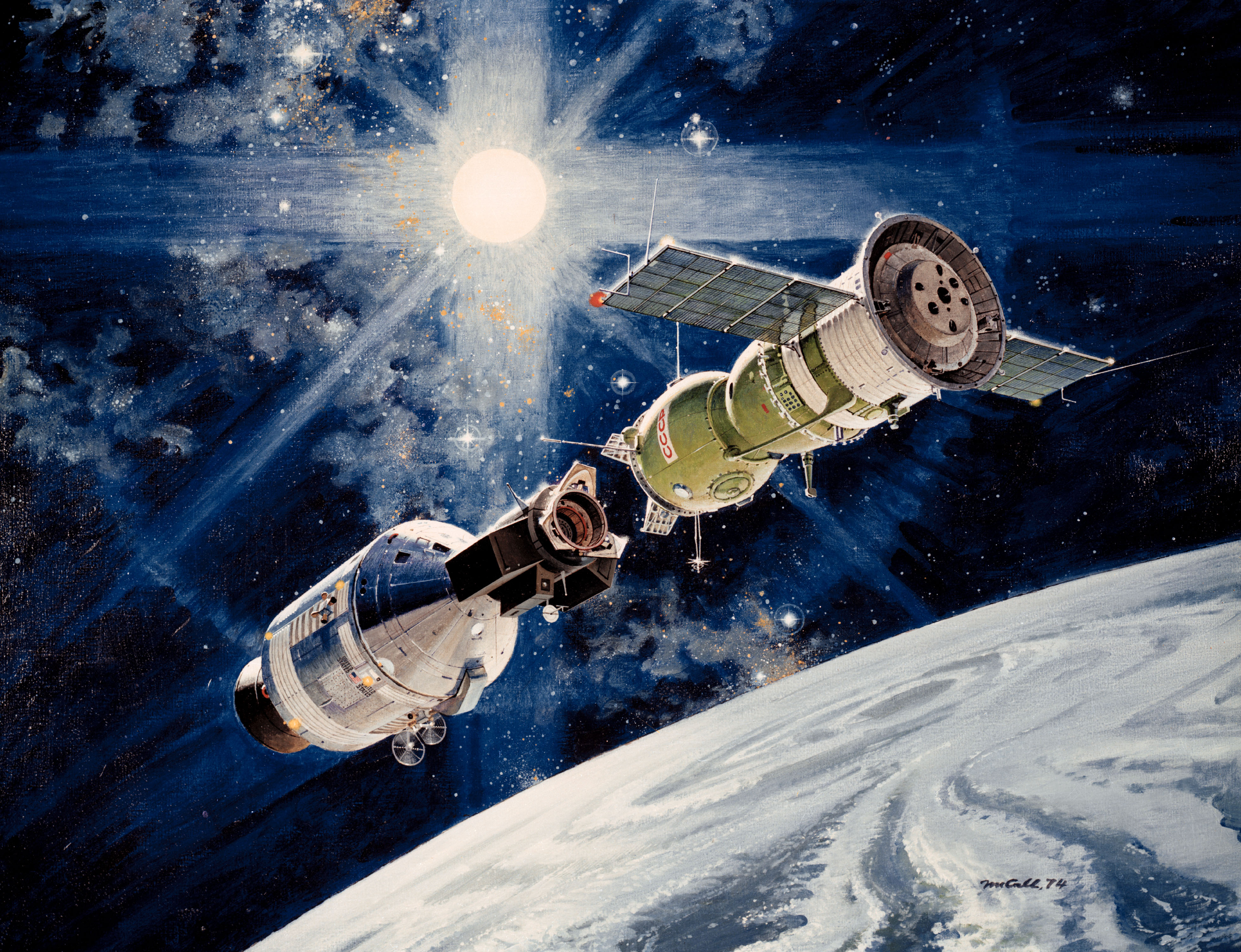
A painting of Apollo–Soyuz, a first milestone in international spaceflight

Early into the space age and ensuing space race the US and USSR began to find opportunities for potential collaborations in outer space. This culminated in the 1975 Apollo–Soyuz Test Project, the first docking of spacecraft from two different spacefaring nations. The ASTP was considered a success, and further joint missions were also contemplated.

One such concept was International Skylab, which proposed launching the backup Skylab B space station for a mission that would see multiple visits by both Apollo and Soyuz crew vehicles. More ambitious was the Skylab-Salyut Space Laboratory, which proposed docking the Skylab B to a Soviet Salyut space station. Falling budgets and rising Cold War tensions in the late 1970s saw these concepts fall by the wayside, along with another plan to have the Space Shuttle dock with a Salyut space station.

In the early 1980s, NASA planned to launch a modular space station called Freedom as a counterpart to the Salyut and Mir space stations. In 1984 the European Space Agency (ESA) was invited to participate in Space Station Freedom, and the ESA approved the Columbus laboratory by 1987. The Japanese Experiment Module (JEM), or Kibō, was announced in 1985, as part of the Freedom space station in response to a NASA request in 1982. The Canadian Space Agency agreed to provide several robotic systems for the ISS at this same time.

In early 1985, science ministers from the ESA countries approved the Columbus program, the most ambitious effort in space undertaken by that organization at the time. The plan spearheaded by Germany and Italy included a module which would be attached to Freedom, and with the capability to evolve into a full-fledged European orbital outpost before the end of the century.

Increasing costs threw these plans into doubt in the early 1990s. Congress was hesitant to provide enough money to build and operate Freedom. As the Freedom budget was approved by a single vote in the U.S. House of Representatives, NASA considered increasing international participation by adding the Russians to defray the rising costs.

The USSR was conducting planning for the Mir-2 space station, and had begun constructing modules for the new station by the mid-1980s. However the collapse of the Soviet Union required these plans to be greatly downscaled, and soon Mir-2 was in danger of never being launched at all. With both space station projects in jeopardy, American and Russian officials met and proposed they be combined.

In September 1993, American Vice-President Al Gore and Russian Prime Minister Viktor Chernomyrdin announced plans for a new space station, which eventually became the International Space Station. They also agreed, in preparation for this new project, that the United States would be involved in the Mir program, including American Shuttles docking, in the Shuttle–Mir program.

=== 1998 agreement ===
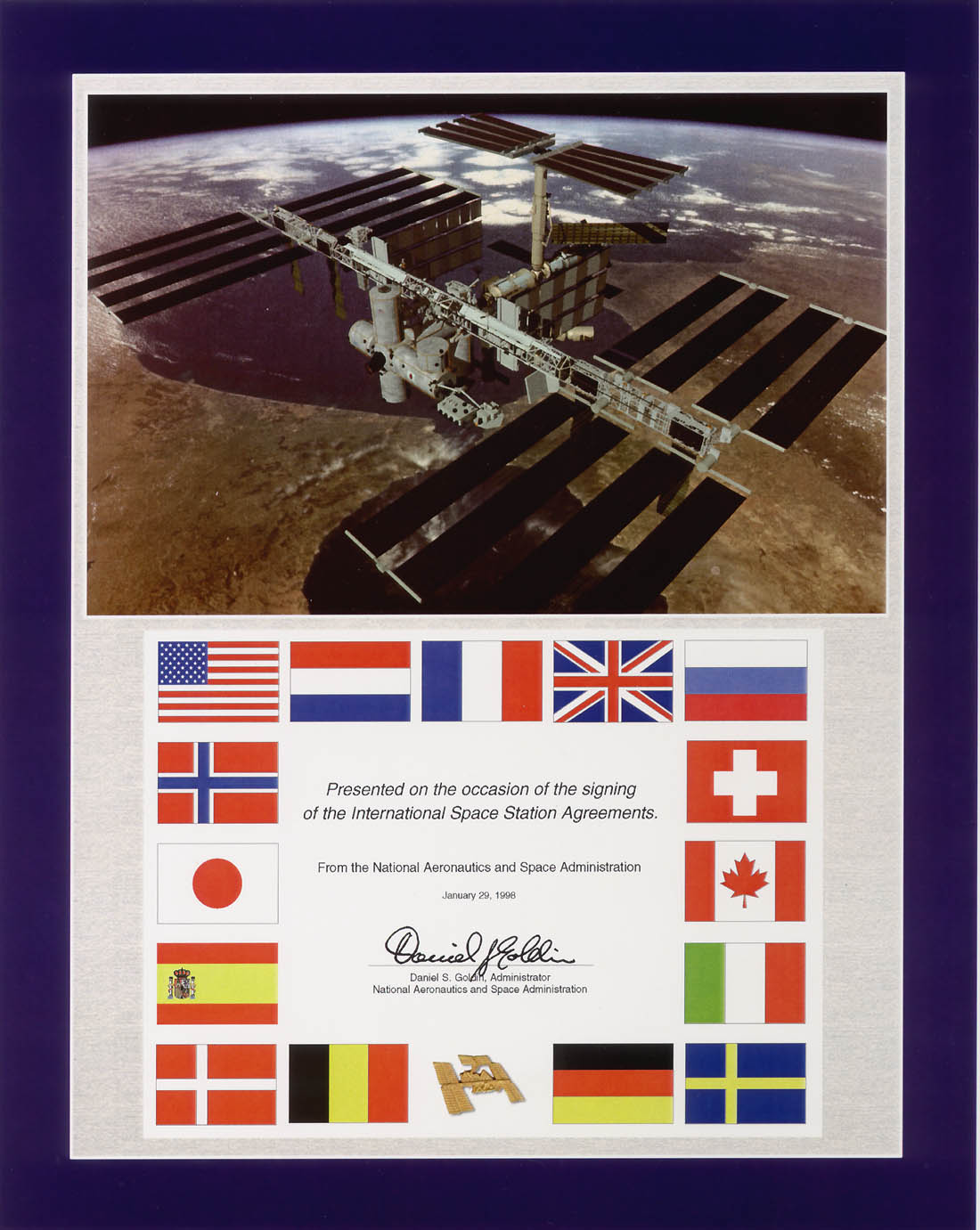
A commemorative plaque honouring Space Station Intergovernmental Agreement signed on January 29, 1998

The legal structure that regulates the station is multi-layered. The primary layer establishing obligations and rights between the ISS partners is the Space Station Intergovernmental Agreement (IGA), an international treaty signed on January 28, 1998 by fifteen governments involved in the space station project. The ISS consists of Canada, Japan, the Russian Federation, the United States, and eleven Member States of the European Space Agency (Belgium, Denmark, France, Germany, Italy, The Netherlands, Norway, Spain, Sweden, Switzerland and the United Kingdom). Article 1 outlines its purpose:

This Agreement is a long term international co-operative framework on the basis of genuine partnership, for the detailed design, development, operation, and utilization of a permanently inhabited civil Space Station for peaceful purposes, in accordance with international law.

The IGA sets the stage for a second layer of agreements between the partners referred to as 'Memoranda of Understanding' (MOUs), of which four exist between NASA and each of the four other partners. There are no MOUs between ESA, Roskosmos, CSA and JAXA because NASA is the designated manager of the ISS. The MOUs are used to describe the roles and responsibilities of the partners in more detail.

A third layer consists of bartered contractual agreements or the trading of the partners' rights and duties, including the 2005 commercial framework agreement between NASA and Roscosmos that sets forth the terms and conditions under which NASA purchases seats on Soyuz crew transporters and cargo capacity on uncrewed Progress transporters.

A fourth legal layer of agreements implements and supplements the four MOUs further. Notably among them is the ISS code of conduct made in 2000, setting out criminal jurisdiction, anti-harassment and certain other behavior rules for ISS crewmembers.

== Program operations ==
=== Expeditions ===
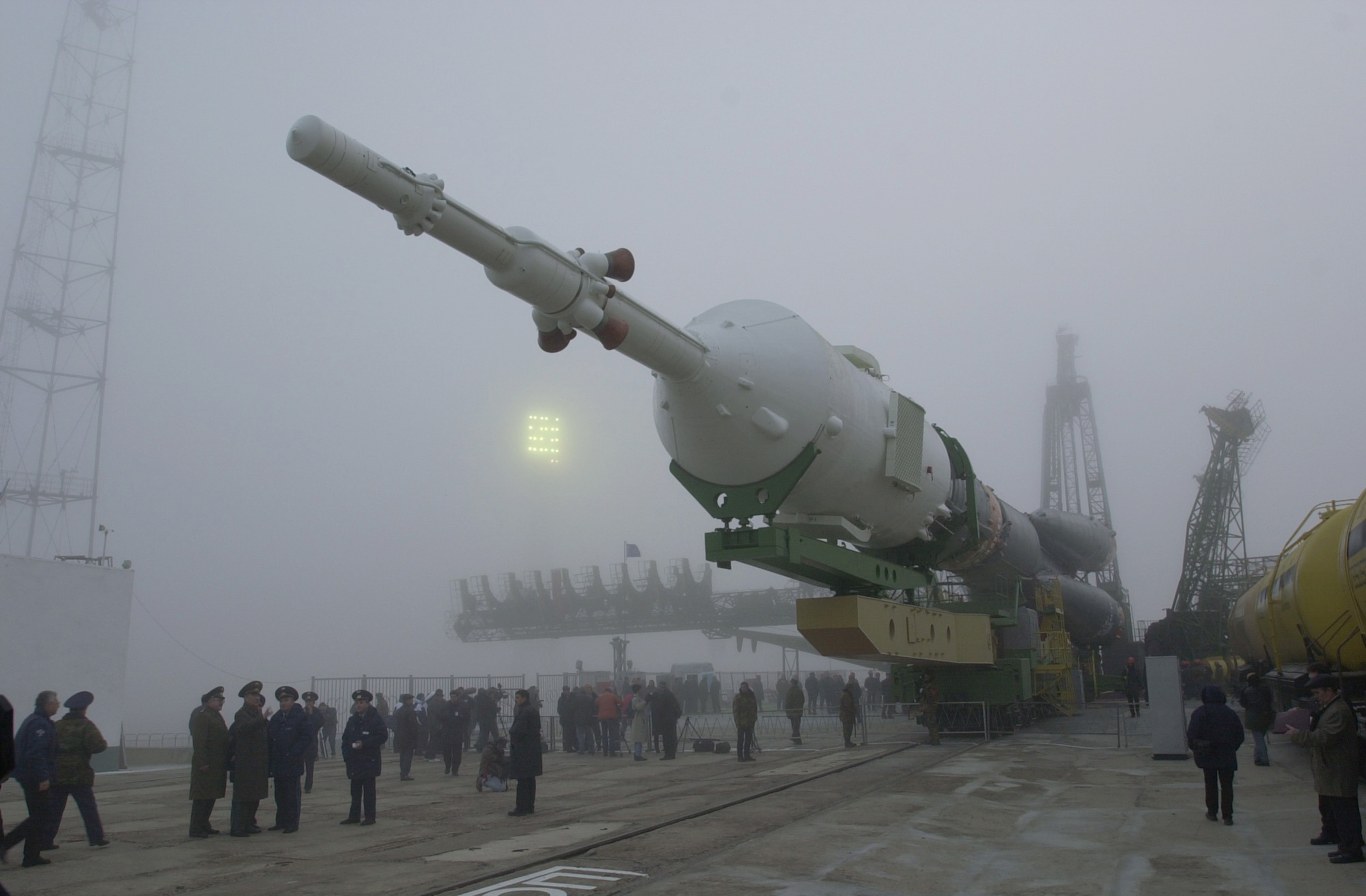
Soyuz TM-31 being prepared to bring the first resident crew to the station in October 2000

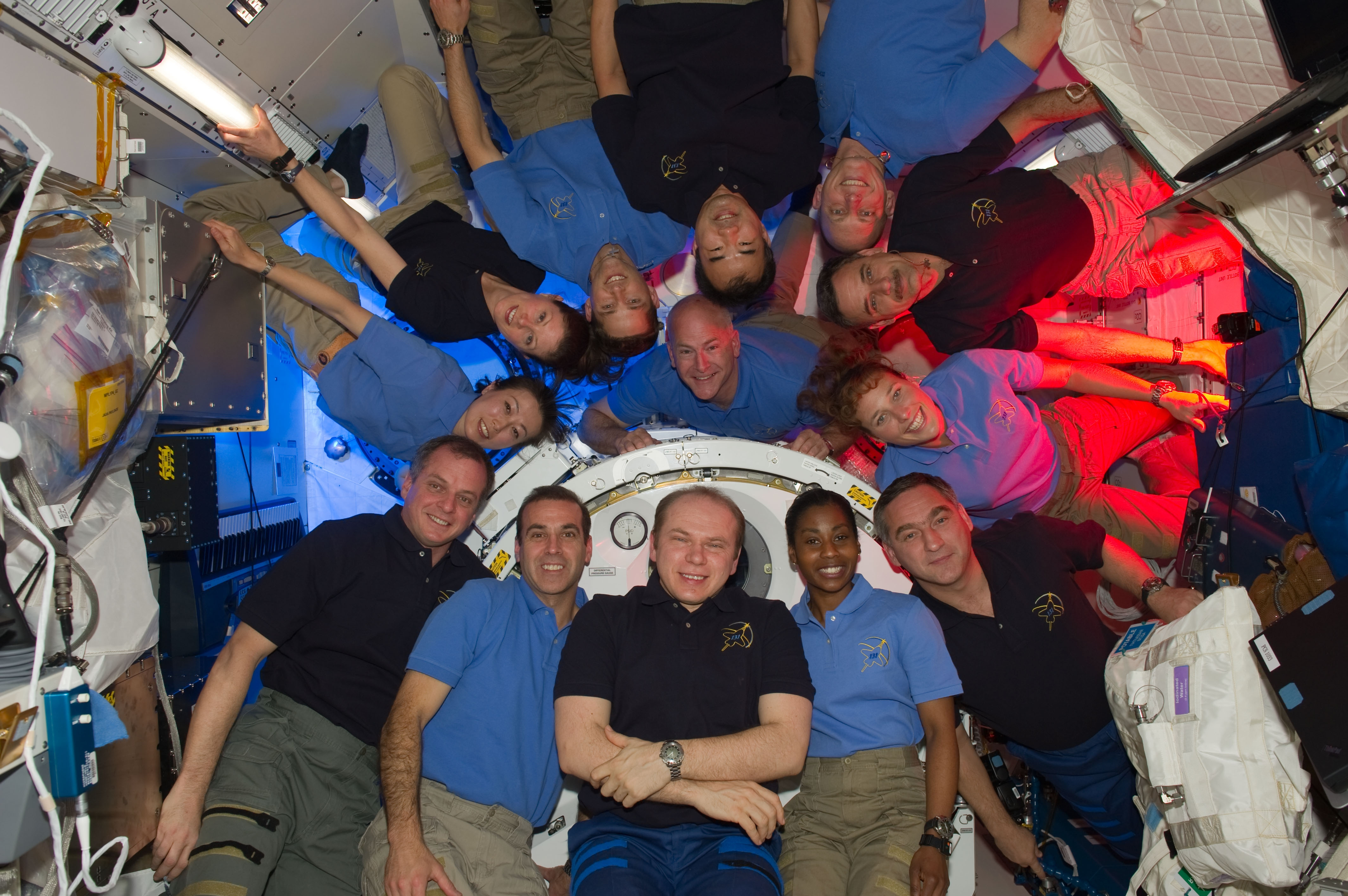
STS-131 and Expedition 23 crew members gather for a group portrait of 13, the maximum the station has hosted, setting the record of four women at the same time in space (2010).

Each permanent crew is given an expedition number. Expeditions run up to six months, from launch until undocking, an 'increment' covers the same time period, but includes cargo spacecraft and all activities. Expeditions 1 to 6 consisted of three-person crews. After the destruction of NASA's Space Shuttle Columbia, Expeditions 7 to 12 were reduced to two-person "caretaker" crews who could maintain the station, because a larger crew could not be fully resupplied by the small Russian Progress cargo spacecraft. After the Shuttle fleet returned to flight, three person crews also returned to the ISS beginning with Expedition 13. As the Shuttle flights expanded the station, crew sizes also expanded, eventually reaching six around 2010. With the arrival of crew on larger US commercial spacecraft beginning in 2020, crew size has been increased to seven, the number for which ISS was originally designed.

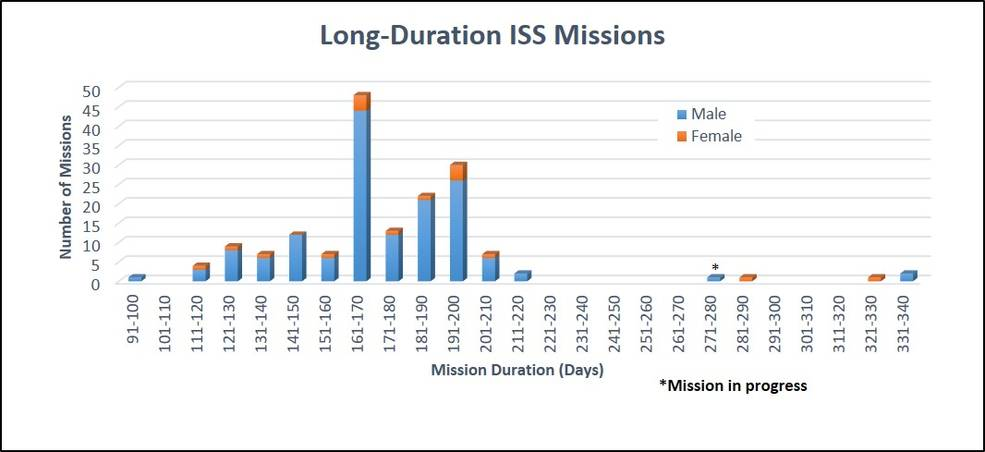
Chart of the number of ISS missions longer than 90 days, until 2020

=== Private flights ===
As of June 2023, 13 individuals have paid for their own travel to visit the ISS. In news coverage, such travellers are often referred to as "space tourists"; however, many have objected to the term, as they typically undergo professional training and conduct scientific, educational, or outreach activities while on orbit. (Note: Privately funded travellers who have objected to the term include Dennis Tito, Mark Shuttleworth, Gregory Olsen, Richard Garriott, and Anousheh Ansari.) Accordingly, Roscosmos and NASA classify them as spaceflight participants.

Initially, privately funded access to the ISS was provided exclusively by Roscosmos through seats on Soyuz spacecraft, either during crew rotations or on dedicated missions. These seats were marketed by Space Adventures at prices of about US$40 million. NASA and the ESA initially criticised the practice, and NASA resisted training Dennis Tito, the first person to pay for an ISS stay. (Note: ESA director Jörg Feustel-Büechl said Russia had no right to send “amateurs” to the ISS. A standoff at the Johnson Space Center occurred when NASA manager Robert Cabana refused to train Tito alongside commander Talgat Musabayev and his crew, who insisted Tito was adequately qualified.)

Beginning in 2021, NASA also began authorizing commercially organized visits known as Private Astronaut Missions (PAMs). These flights are required to use a NASA-certified U.S. commercial vehicle and to include a mission commander who is a former NASA astronaut, responsible for spacecraft operations and oversight of the other spaceflight participants. The first PAM, Axiom Mission 1, launched in 2022 with one Axiom commander and three private passengers, followed in 2023 by Axiom Mission 2, with one private passenger and two astronauts from the Saudi Space Agency. As of 2025, NASA offers up to two PAM opportunities per year. In addition to private individuals, PAMs are frequently used by ESA and other national governments to fly astronauts for short-term missions.

=== Fleet operations ===
Various crewed and uncrewed spacecraft have supported the station's operations. Flights to the ISS have included 95 Progress, (Note: Including the modified DC-1, M-MIM2 and M-UM module transports) 73 Soyuz, 52 SpaceX Dragon, (Note: Includes both crewed and uncrewed missions) 37 Space Shuttle, 22 Cygnus, 10 HTV/HTV-X, 5 ATV, and 2 Boeing Starliner missions.

There are currently eight docking ports for visiting spacecraft, with four additional ports installed but not yet put into service:

1. Harmony forward (with PMA 2 & IDA 2)
2. Harmony zenith (with PMA 3 & IDA 3)
3. Harmony nadir (CBM port)
4. Unity nadir (CBM port)
5. Prichal aft (Note: The Prichal aft, forward, port and starboard ports still have their protective covers in place and have yet to be used since the module originally docked at the station.)
6. Prichal forward
7. Prichal nadir
8. Prichal port
9. Prichal starboard
10. Poisk zenith
11. Rassvet nadir
12. Zvezda aft

Forward ports are at the front of the station in its usual orientation and direction of travel. Aft is the opposite, at the rear. Nadir points toward Earth, while zenith points away from it. Port is to the left and starboard to the right when one's feet are toward Earth and one is facing forward, in the direction of travel.

Cargo spacecraft that will perform an orbital re-boost of the station will typically dock at an aft, forward or nadir-facing port.

==== Crewed ====
As of 31 July 2025, 290 people from 26 countries had visited the space station, many of them multiple times. The United States sent 170 people, Russia sent 64, 11 were Japanese, nine were Canadian, six were Italian, four were French, four were German, two from the United Arab Emirates, Hungary and Saudi Arabia and one each from Belgium, Brazil, Denmark, Israel, Kazakhstan, Malaysia, the Netherlands, India, Turkey, Belarus, South Africa, Poland, South Korea, Spain, Sweden, and the United Kingdom.

==== Uncrewed ====
Uncrewed spaceflights to the International Space Station (ISS) are made primarily to deliver cargo, however several Russian modules have also docked to the outpost following uncrewed launches. Resupply missions typically use the Russian Progress spacecraft, i.e., Progress-M (Standard and Modified), Progress-M1 and Progress MS series vehicles, European Automated Transfer Vehicles, Japanese Kounotori vehicles, and the American Dragon 1 and 2 vehicles and Cygnus (Standard, Enhanced and XL series) spacecraft. The primary docking system for Progress spacecraft is the automated Kurs system, with the manual TORU system as a backup. ATVs also use Kurs, however they are not equipped with TORU. The other spacecraft — the Japanese HTVs and HTV-Xs, the SpaceX Dragon (under CRS phase 1) and the Northrop Grumman Cygnus vehicles — rendezvous with the station before being grappled using Canadarm2 and berthed at the nadir port of the Harmony or Unity module for one to two months. Progress, Cygnus and ATV can remain docked for up to six months. Under CRS phase 2, SpaceX Cargo Dragon docks autonomously at IDA-2 or 3 as the case may be. As of November 2026, Progress spacecraft have flown most of the uncrewed missions to the ISS.

=== Repairs ===
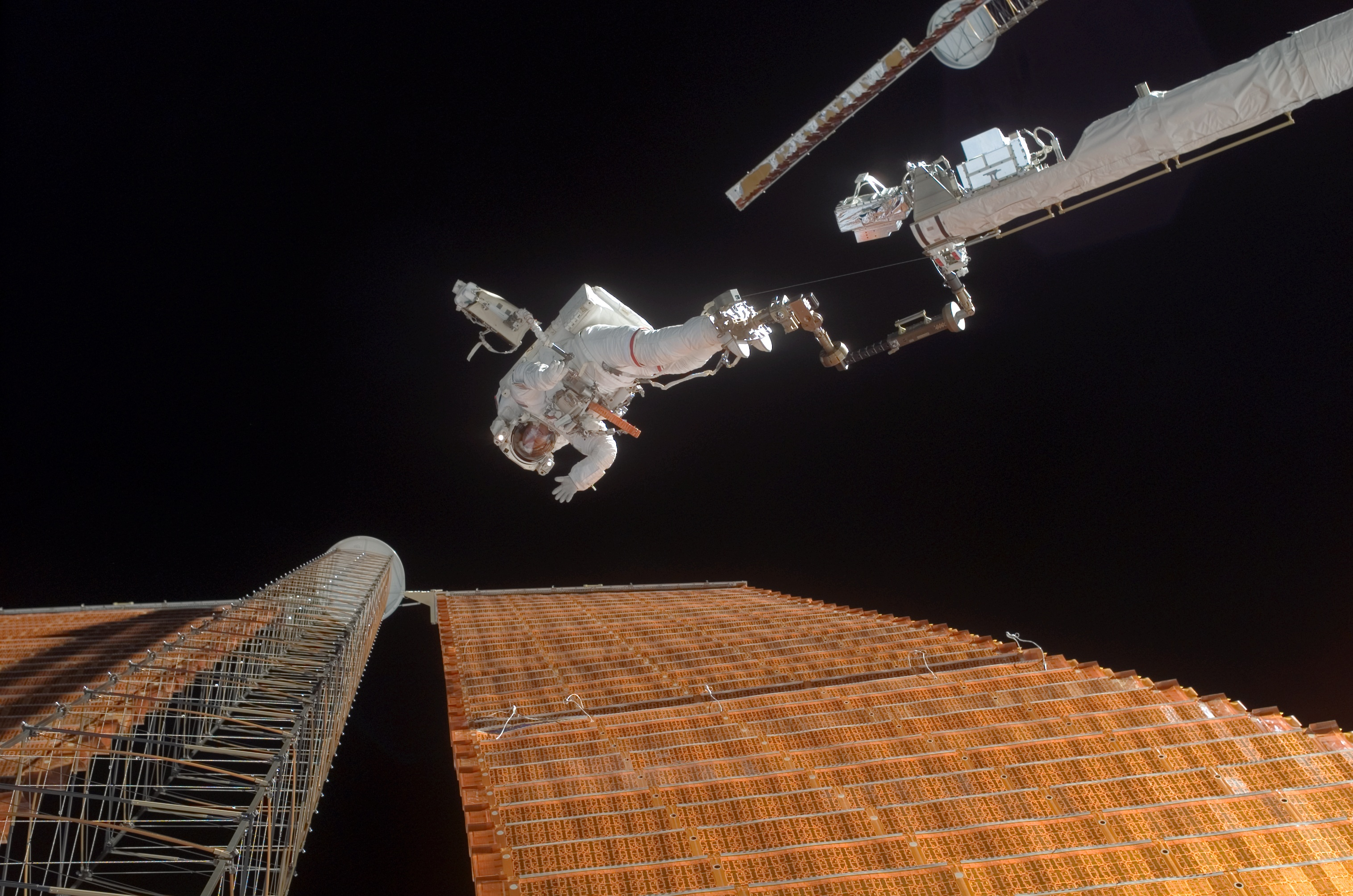
Astronaut Scott Parazynski of STS-120 conducted a 7-hour, 19-minute spacewalk to repair (essentially sew) a damaged solar panel which helps supply power to the International Space Station. NASA considered the spacewalk dangerous with potential risk of electrical shock.

Since construction started, the International Space Station program has had to deal with several maintenance issues, unexpected problems and failures. These incidents have affected the assembly timeline, led to periods of reduced capabilities of the station and in some cases could have forced the crew to abandon the space station for safety reasons, had these problems not been resolved.

=== Mission control centers ===
The components of the ISS are operated and monitored by their respective space agencies at mission control centers across the globe.

The two primary control centers are:

- Roscosmos' RKA Mission Control Center at Korolyov, Russia — manages the maintaining of the station, controls launches of the crewed missions, guides launches from Baikonur Cosmodrome
- NASA's Christopher C. Kraft Jr. Mission Control Center at Lyndon B. Johnson Space Center in Houston, Texas – serves as the primary control facility for the United States segment (USOS) of the ISS

They are supported by several more specialized control centers:

- JAXA's JEM Control Center and HTV Control Center at Tsukuba Space Center (TKSC) in Ibaraki, Japan – responsible for operating the Kibō laboratory complex and all flights of the HTV cargo spacecraft, respectively
- NASA's Payload Operations and Integration Center at Marshall Space Flight Center in Huntsville, Alabama – coordinates payload operations in the USOS
- ESA's Columbus Control Center at the German Aerospace Center in Oberpfaffenhofen, Germany – manages the European Columbus research laboratory
- CSA's MSS Control at Saint-Hubert, Quebec, Canada – controls and monitors the Mobile Servicing System
Space centers involved with the ISS program

== Politics ==
Primary contributing nations Formerly contracted nations

The politics of the International Space Station have been affected by superpower rivalries, international treaties, and funding arrangements. The space station has an international crew, with the use of their time, and that of equipment on the station, being governed by treaties between participant nations. The station is divided into the Russian Orbital Segment, and the US Orbital Segment. Crews are launched to the station via Russian Soyuz missions and US launch vehicles, although the US operated none between the 2011 Space Shuttle retirement and 2018 first crewed launch of SpaceX Dragon 2. The station has been resupplied by cargo spacecraft operated by the US, Russia, European Space Agency, and Japan.

The ISS program concept was formulated in 1993 by the United States and Russia, when their Freedom and Mir-2 station concepts failed for budgetary reasons. The countries also collaborated on the 1993–1998 Shuttle–Mir program. In 1998, the Space Station Intergovernmental Agreement was signed by fifteen countries, representing NASA, Russia's Roscosmos, Canadian Space Agency, Japan's JAXA, and eleven member states of the European Space Agency. ISS assembly began the same year. China expressed interest in the ISS program, but the 2011 Wolf Amendment prohibited most cooperation between NASA and China National Space Administration. In 2014, in response to the Russian annexation of Crimea, NASA ended most relations with Roscosmos, with the major exception of ISS operations. In 2022, the Russian invasion of Ukraine threatened to terminate Russian involvement in the ISS, but as of 2025 there has been no disruption, and all crewed launches continue to have American and Russian members, as well as other nationalities. Russia has committed to ISS operations until at least 2028, and plans to construct the Russian Orbital Service Station from 2027. The US, ESA, Canada, and Japan have committed to ISS operations until 2030, and NASA plans to deorbit the station in 2031, if the replacement Commercial LEO Destinations program has met NASA's needs. As of late 2026, Russia has solidified its operational schedule to maintain its segments on the International Space Station through 2028 while gradually transitioning resources toward its independent station project. Roscosmos has finalized the engineering designs for the initial modules of the Russian Orbital Service Station, with the first core modules now scheduled for orbital deployment in early 2028 to establish an independent low Earth orbit presence before the planned decommissioning of the ISS.

Since the last mission to Mir in 1999, only China has operated other crewed stations. It has crewed the Tiangong space station since 2021, as well the prototypes Tiangong-2 and Tiangong-1.

=== Usage of crew and hardware ===
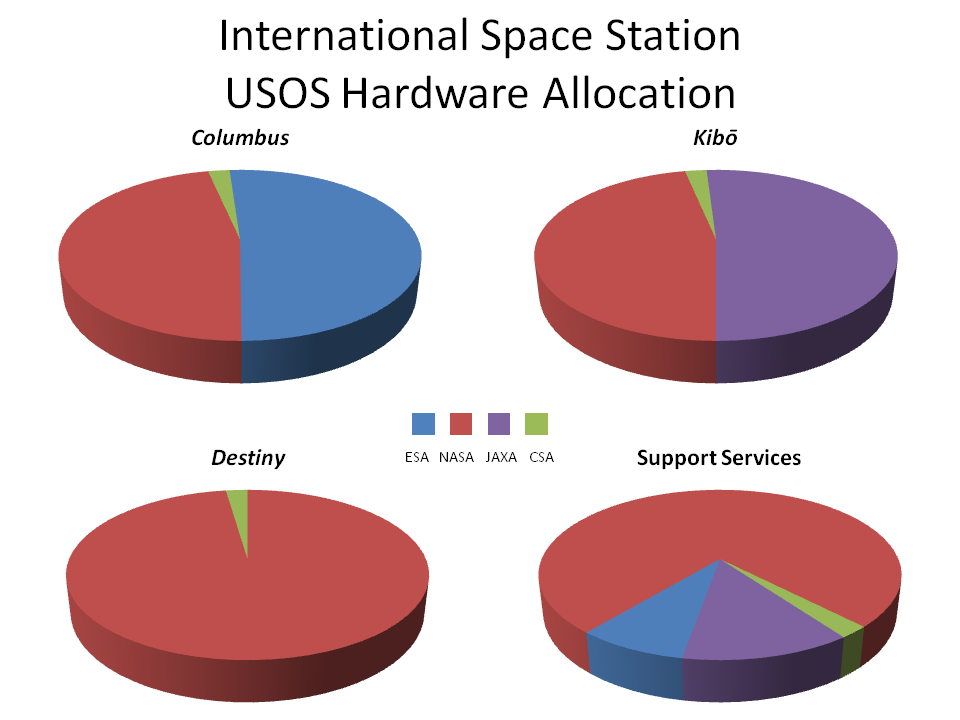
Allocation of US Orbital Segment hardware usage between nations

There is no fixed percentage of ownership for the whole space station. Rather, Article 5 of the IGA sets forth that each partner shall retain jurisdiction and control over the elements it registers and over personnel in or on the Space Station who are its nationals. Therefore, for each ISS module only one partner retains sole ownership. Still, the agreements to use the space station facilities are more complex.

The station is composed of two sides: the Russian Orbital Segment (ROS) and U.S. Orbital Segment (USOS).

- Russian Orbital Segment (mostly Russian ownership, except the Zarya module)
  - Zarya: first component of the Space Station, storage, USSR/Russia-built, U.S.-funded (hence U.S.-owned)
  - Zvezda: the functional centre of the Russian portion, living quarters, Russia-owned
  - Poisk: airlock, docking, Russia-owned
  - Rassvet: storage, docking
  - Nauka: multipurpose laboratory
  - Prichal: docking, Russia-owned
  - Pirs (Deorbited)
- U.S. Orbital Segment (mixed U.S. and international ownership)
  - Columbus laboratory: 51% for ESA, 46.7% for NASA and 2.3% for CSA.
  - Kibō laboratory: Japanese module, 51% for JAXA, 46.7% for NASA and 2.3% for CSA.
  - Destiny laboratory: 97.7% for NASA and 2.3% for CSA.
  - Crew time, electrical power and rights to purchase supporting services (such as data upload & download and communications) are divided 76.6% for NASA, 12.8% for JAXA, 8.3% for ESA, and 2.3% for CSA.

== Future of the ISS ==
=== 2008 discussions ===
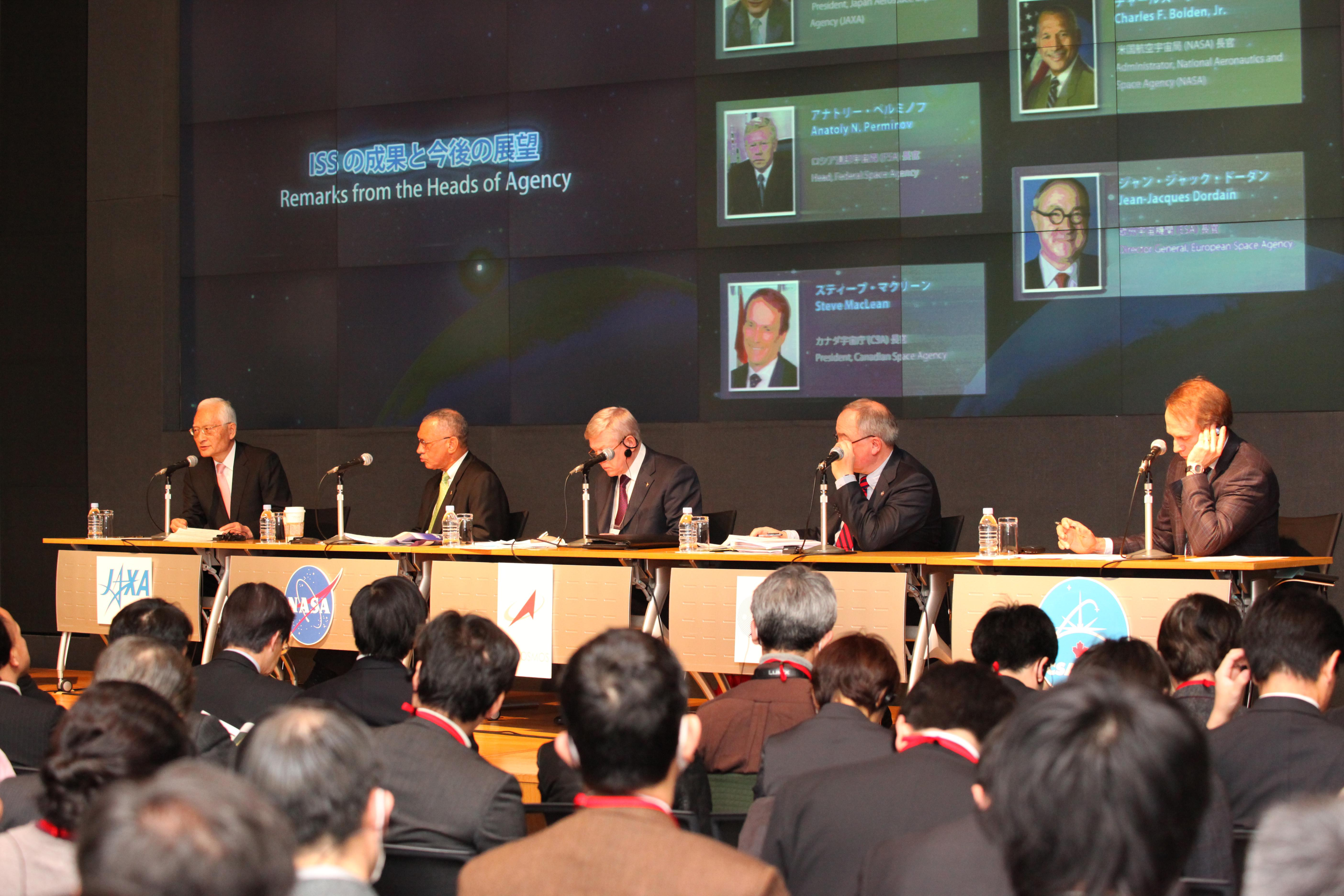
The heads of the ISS agencies from Canada, Europe, Japan, Russia and the United States meet in Tokyo to review ISS cooperation.

Former NASA Administrator Michael D. Griffin says the International Space Station has a role to play as NASA moves forward with a new focus for the crewed space program, which is to go out beyond Earth orbit for purposes of human exploration and scientific discovery. "The International Space Station is now a stepping stone on the way, rather than being the end of the line", Griffin said. Griffin has said that station crews will not only continue to learn how to live and work in space, but also will learn how to build hardware that can survive and function for the years required to make the round-trip voyage from Earth to Mars.

Despite this view, however, in an internal e-mail leaked to the press on August 18, 2008 from Griffin to NASA managers, Griffin apparently communicated his belief that the current US administration had made no viable plan for US crews to participate in the ISS beyond 2011, and that the Office of Management and Budget (OMB) and Office of Science and Technology Policy (OSTP) were actually seeking its demise. The e-mail appeared to suggest that Griffin believed the only reasonable solution was to extend the operation of the Space Shuttle beyond 2010, but noted that Executive Policy (i.e. the White House) was firm that there would be no extension of the Space Shuttle retirement date, and thus no US capability to launch crews into orbit until the Orion spacecraft would become operational in 2020 as part of the Constellation program. He did not see purchase of Russian launches for NASA crews as politically viable following the 2008 South Ossetia war, and hoped the incoming Barack Obama administration would resolve the issue in 2009 by extending Space Shuttle operations beyond 2010.

A solicitation issued by NASA JSC indicates NASA's intent to purchase from Roscosmos "a minimum of 3 Soyuz seats up to a maximum of 24 seats beginning in the Spring of 2012" to provide ISS crew transportation.

On September 7, 2008, NASA released a statement regarding the leaked email, in which Griffin said:

The leaked internal email fails to provide the contextual framework for my remarks, and my support for the administration's policies. Administration policy is to retire the shuttle in 2010 and purchase crew transport from Russia until Ares and Orion are available. The administration continues to support our request for an INKSNA exemption. Administration policy continues to be that we will take no action to preclude continued operation of the International Space Station past 2016. I strongly support these administration policies, as do OSTP and OMB.

— Michael D. Griffin

On October 15, 2008, President Bush signed the NASA Authorization Act of 2008, giving NASA funding for one additional mission to "deliver science experiments to the station". The Act allows for an additional Space Shuttle flight, STS-134, to the ISS to install the Alpha Magnetic Spectrometer, which was previously cancelled.

President of the United States Barack Obama has supported the continued operation of the station, and supported the NASA Authorization Act of 2008. Obama's plan for space exploration includes finishing the station and completion of the US programs related to the Orion spacecraft.

=== Discussions after Russian invasion of Ukraine ===
On 12 April 2021, at a meeting with Russian President Vladimir Putin, then-Deputy Prime Minister Yury Borisov announced he had decided that Russia might withdraw from the ISS program in 2025. According to Russian authorities, the timeframe of the station's operations has expired and its condition leaves much to be desired. On 26 July 2022, Borisov, who had become head of Roscosmos, submitted to Putin his plans for withdrawal from the program after 2024. However, Robyn Gatens, the NASA official in charge of space station operations, responded that NASA had not received any formal notices from Roscosmos concerning withdrawal plans. On 21 September 2022, Borisov stated that Russia was "highly likely" to continue to participate in the ISS program until 2028. In 2025, Dmitry Bakanov succeeded Borisov as the head of Roscosmos and began the planning and eventual construction of the Russian Orbital Service Station. This station aims to supersede the ISS with construction planned to begin in 2028 utilizing parts flown up into space and elements of the Russian Orbital Segment.

=== End of mission ===
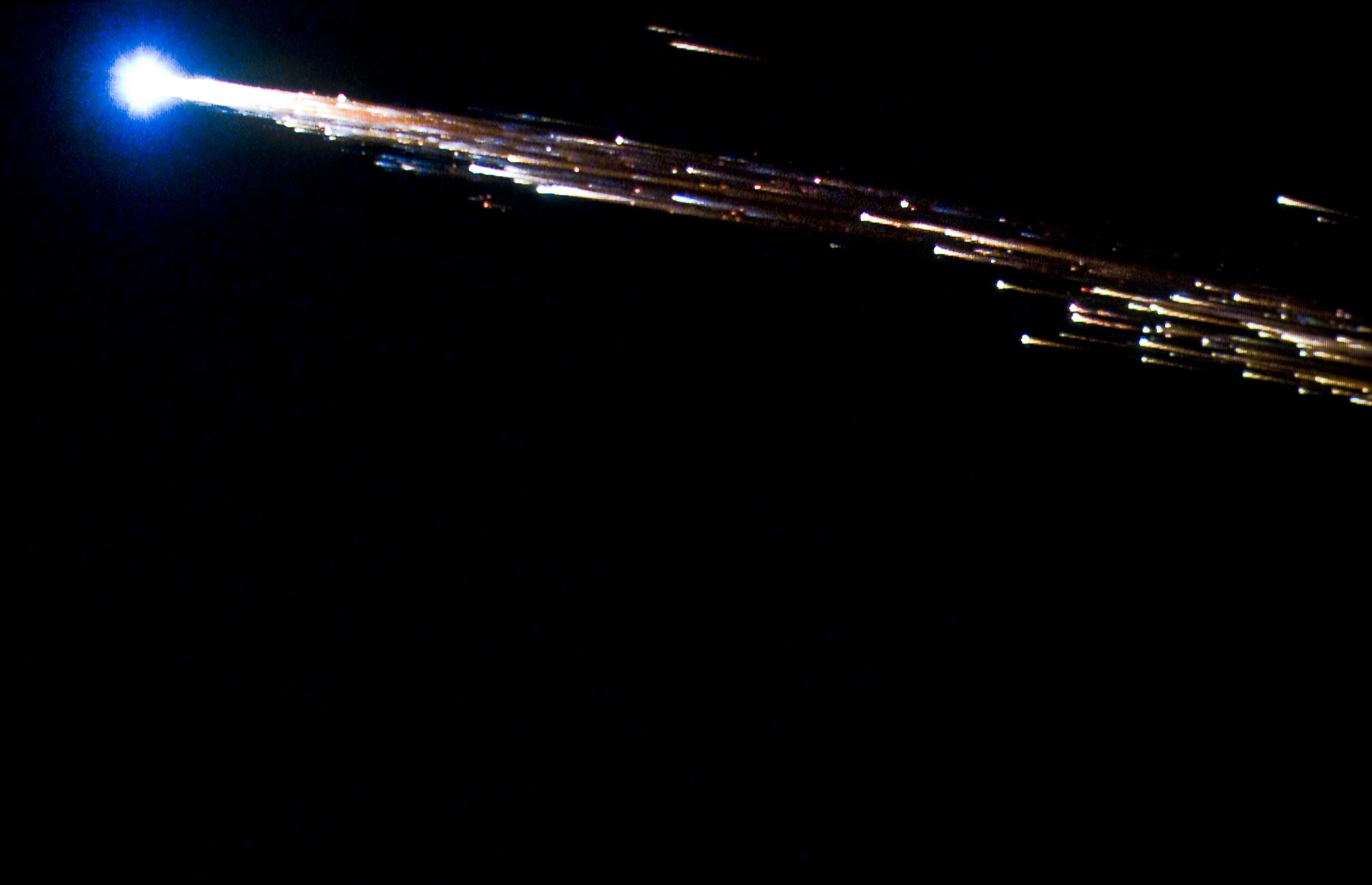
Many ISS resupply spacecraft have already undergone atmospheric re-entry, such as Jules Verne ATV.

The ISS was originally intended for a 15-year mission, but the mission has been repeatedly extended due to its success and support. As a result, the oldest modules of the ISS have been in orbit for more than 25 years.

The US planned in 2009 to deorbit the ISS in 2016. But on 30 September 2015, Boeing's contract with NASA as prime contractor for the ISS was extended to 30 September 2020. Part of Boeing's services under the contract related to extending the station's primary structural hardware past 2020 to the end of 2028. In July 2018, the Space Frontier Act of 2018 was intended to extend operations of the ISS to 2030. This bill was unanimously approved in the Senate, but failed to pass in the U.S. House. In September 2018, the Leading Human Spaceflight Act was introduced with the intent to extend operations of the ISS to 2030, and was confirmed in December 2018. Congress later passed similar provisions in its CHIPS and Science Act, signed into law by U.S. President Joe Biden on 9 August 2022.

NASA has suggested extending ISS operations beyond 2030 if Commercial LEO Destinations providers prove insufficient to accommodate NASA's needs. In February 2026, during a vote to approve the NASA Reauthorization Act of 2026, members of the United States House Committee on Science, Space, and Technology introduced an amendment requiring NASA to explore the feasibility of relocating the ISS to a safe orbital harbor following its end-of-life so that it can be preserved for potential re-use, as an alternative to destructive atmospheric re-entry, with the amendment submitted by George T. Whitesides with bipartisan support from Nick Begich III, Brian Babin and Don Beyer.

In a January 2026 plan, Axiom Station, while a segment of the ISS, would pick up and use established science hardware and the Canadarm2 from the ISS.

Russia meanwhile has stated that it plans to pull out of the ISS program after 2025. However, Russian modules will provide orbital station-keeping until 2028. Recommendations by the U.S.-Russian Joint Commission identified the thrusters of the Russian ISS segment as a deorbit backup. In late 2025 Russia has under budget constraints reconsidered their future space station plans to again include modules from the ISS.

=== New partners ===
China has reportedly expressed interest in the project, especially if it would be able to work with the Russian Federal Space Agency. Due to national security concerns, the United States Congress passed a law prohibiting contact between US and Chinese space programs. As of 2019, China is not involved in the International Space Station. In addition to national security concerns, United States objections include China's human rights record and issues surrounding technology transfer. The heads of both the South Korean and Indian space agencies announced at the first plenary session of the 2009 International Astronautical Congress on 12 October that their nations intend to join the ISS program. The talks began in 2010, and were not successful. The heads of agency also expressed support for extending ISS lifetime. European countries not a part of the International Space Station program will be allowed access to the station in a three-year trial period, ESA officials say. The Indian Space Research Organisation has made it clear that it will not join the ISS and will instead build its own space station.

== Cost ==
The ISS has been described as the most expensive single item ever constructed. As of 2010, the total cost was US$150 billion. This includes NASA's budget of $58.7 billion ($89.73 billion in 2021 dollars) for the station from 1985 to 2015, Russia's $12 billion, Europe's $5 billion, Japan's $5 billion, Canada's $2 billion, and the cost of 36 shuttle flights to build the station, estimated at $1.4 billion each, or $50.4 billion in total. Assuming 20,000 man-days of use from 2000 to 2015 by two- to six-person crews, each man-day would cost $7.5 million, less than half the inflation-adjusted $19.6 million ($5.5 million before inflation) per man-day of Skylab. NASA spends about US$3 billion per year on operational costs.

== Public opinion ==
The International Space Station has been the target of varied criticism over the years. Critics contend that the time and money spent on the ISS could be better spent on other projects—whether they be robotic spacecraft missions, space exploration, investigations of problems here on Earth, or just tax savings. Some critics, like Robert L. Park, argue that very little scientific research was convincingly planned for the ISS in the first place. They also argue that the primary feature of a space-based laboratory is its microgravity environment, which can usually be studied more cheaply with a "vomit comet".

One of the most ambitious ISS modules to date, the Centrifuge Accommodations Module, has been cancelled due to the prohibitive costs NASA faces in simply completing the ISS. As a result, the research done on the ISS is generally limited to experiments which do not require any specialized apparatus. For example, in the first half of 2007, ISS research dealt primarily with human biological responses to being in space, covering topics like kidney stones, circadian rhythm, and the effects of cosmic rays on the nervous system.

Other critics have attacked the ISS on some technical design grounds:

1. Jeff Foust argued that the ISS requires too much maintenance, especially by risky, expensive EVAs. The magazine The American Enterprise reports, for instance, that ISS astronauts "now spend 85 percent of their time on construction and maintenance" alone.
2. The Astronomical Society of the Pacific has mentioned that its orbit is rather highly inclined, which makes Russian launches cheaper, but US launches more expensive.

Critics also say that NASA is often casually credited with "spin-offs" (such as Velcro and portable computers) that were developed independently for other reasons. NASA maintains a list of spin-offs from the construction of the ISS, as well as from work performed on the ISS.

In response to some of these criticisms, advocates of human space exploration say that criticism of the ISS program is short-sighted, and that crewed space research and exploration have produced billions of dollars' worth of tangible benefits to people on Earth. Jerome Schnee estimated that the indirect economic return from spin-offs of human space exploration has been many times the initial public investment. A review of the claims by the Federation of American Scientists argued that NASA's rate of return from spin-offs is actually "astoundingly bad", except for aeronautics work that has led to aircraft sales.

It is therefore debatable whether the ISS, as distinct from the wider space program, is a major contributor to society. Some advocates argue that apart from its scientific value, it is an important example of international cooperation. Others claim that the ISS is an asset that, if properly leveraged, could allow more economical crewed Lunar and Mars missions.
