= Vladimir Popovkin =

Russian general (1957–2014)

- Владимир Александрович Поповкин
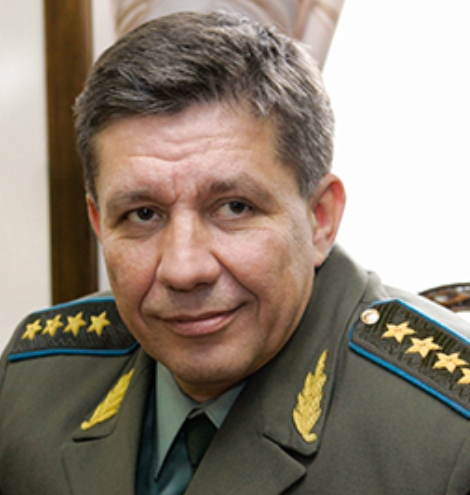
- Popovkin in 2008
- Born: Vladimir Aleksandrovich Popovkin; 25 September 1957; Dushanbe, Tajik SSR, Soviet Union
- Died: 18 June 2014 (aged 56); Petah Tikva, Israel
- Military career
- Allegiance: Russia
- Branch: Space Forces
- Service years: 1975–2009
- Rank: General of the Army
- Commands: Space Forces
- Awards: Order of Merit for the Fatherland, Order of Military Merit
- Other work: General Director of the Russian Federal Space Agency

Vladimir Aleksandrovich Popovkin (Russian: Владимир Александрович Поповкин; 25 September 1957 – 18 June 2014) was a Russian statesman and military figure. He was a commander of the Russian Space Forces, then First Deputy Defense Minister of Russia, then General Director of the Russian Federal Space Agency. He had the military rank of General of the Army and the federal state civilian service rank of 1st class Active State Councillor of the Russian Federation.

== Biography ==
Vladimir Popovkin was born on 25 September 1957 in Dushanbe, Tajik SSR, Soviet Union, where his father was serving in the 211th Tank Division. His family moved to Kalinin in 1968 where he began to study physics and mathematics. He entered service with the Soviet Army in 1975, and graduated as an engineer from Leningrad Military-Space Academy in 1979.

Following graduation, Popovkin served at the Baikonur Cosmodrome in various positions, including as an engineer, head of engineering and as the launch commander of Launch Pad 1 (Gagarin's Start).

=== After Baikonur ===
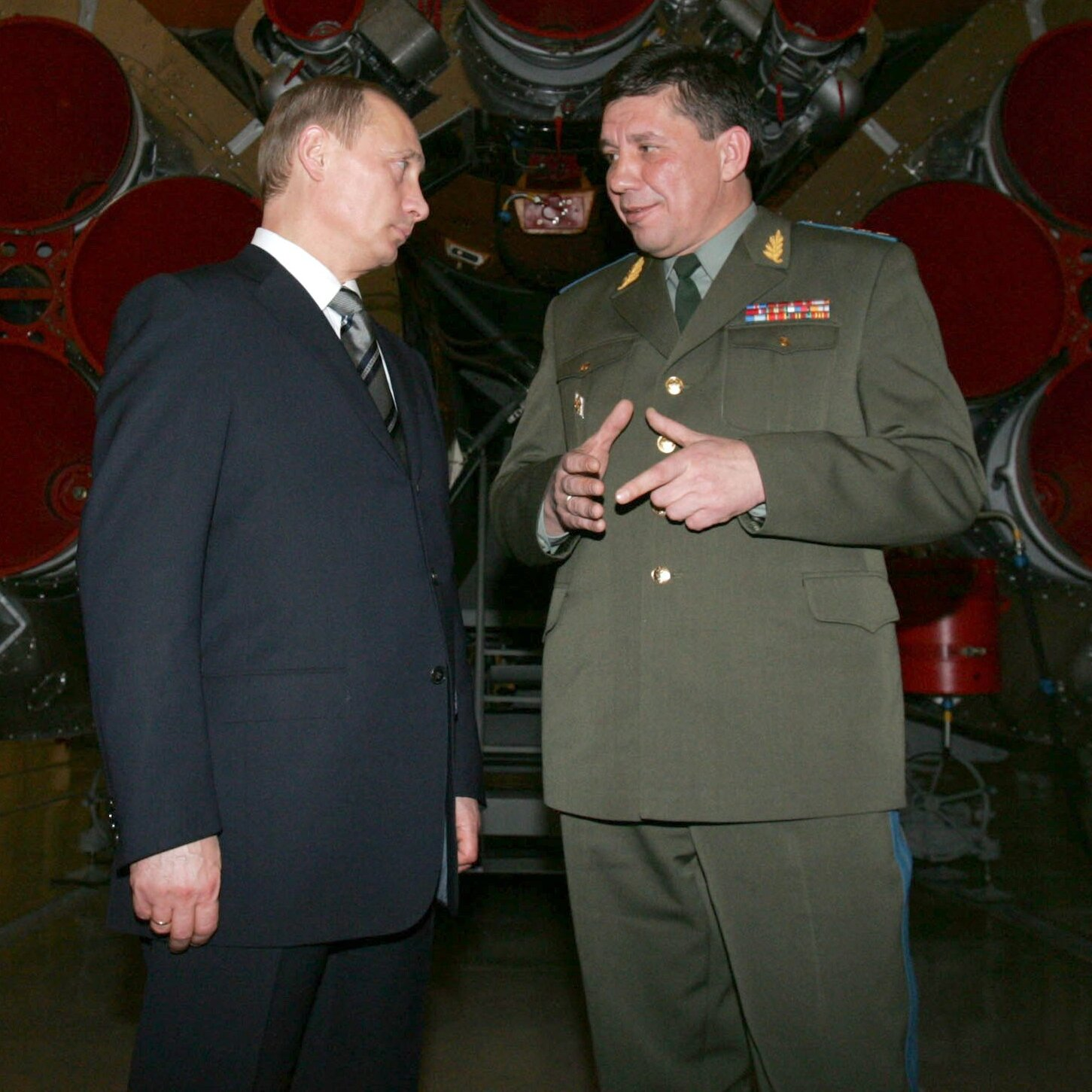
Popovkin with Russian President Vladimir Putin in 2006

In 1986, Popovkin received a position at the Directorate of Space Systems in the Ministry of Defence. In 1989 Popovkin graduated from Military Academy of Strategic Rocket Forces and continued working as an officer and senior officer in the Directorate of Space Systems.

In 1991, he moved to the General Staff in Moscow where he held a number of positions ending up with a senior position in operational management.

After the creation of the Russian Space Forces in 2001, the then Major General Popovkin was appointed the first Chief of Staff by President Vladimir Putin. He is also reported as being the head of the board of trustees of the military's space academy.

On 10 March 2004, Lieutenant General Popovkin was appointed commander of the Space Forces, replacing Anatoly Perminov. The media at the time described him as a young high flyer.

In July 2008, he was promoted to Chief of Armaments of Ministry of Defense, working on military procurement. On 22 February 2009 he was promoted to General of the Army, and a month later he retired from the military, becoming a Federal State Official.

After retiring from the military, Popovkin served as First Deputy Minister of Defence from June 2010 to April 2011, under Anatoly Serdyukov.

On 29 April 2011, Popovkin was appointed as the head of Russian Federal Space Agency (Roscosmos).

== Roscosmos ==
=== Fobos-Grunt ===
Popovkin was head of Roscosmos during the failed launch of Mars probe Fobos-Grunt. He initially suggested that the Fobos-Grunt failure might have been the result of sabotage by a foreign nation. Popovkin announced on 1 February 2012 that a burst of cosmic radiation may have caused computers to reboot and go into a standby mode. Popovkin blamed possibly counterfeit microchips for the issue. At the same time, responding to the director of the Russian Space Research Institute, the main participant of the mission, Lev Zeleny regarding the proposed repeat mission called Phobos-Grunt-2, he stated that Roscosmos would immediately attempt that if they couldn't reach a deal with the European Space Agency about their ExoMars program. However, Roscosmos did reach an agreement with ESA on 15 March 2012. As a result, there was no immediate attempt to repeat the Fobos-Grunt mission until the 2030s, and Russia's financing of ExoMars could be partially covered by insurance payments of 1.2 billion rubles (US$40.7 million) for the lost Fobos-Grunt.

=== Hospitalisation ===
He was admitted to Burdenko Military Hospital in Moscow on 7 March 2012 because of "physical and emotional exhaustion." Kommersant claimed that he fainted on the stairs outside the agency and Russian tabloid Life News claimed he was hospitalised with head injuries. Other media claims that he was hospitalised after being struck on the head with a bottle during a fight, and that the fight was over his press secretary and former model Anna Vedicheva.

When Popovkin returned to work on 19 March 2012 he gave an interview with Izvestia in which he vehemently denied some of the stories about the reasons for his hospitalisation, which he blamed on sections of the Russian space industry who are threatened by his attempts to counter corruption. In response GLONASS developer Russian Space Systems (Российские космические системы) published an open letter from Director Ivan Golub calling on Popovkin to resign, in part due to the brawl, although mainly due to the claim made by Popovkin of embezzlement in GLONASS. Roscosmos responded by denying that Popovkin was injured after a fight.

On 29 March 2012, Popovkin was reported as saying that he fainted after leaving work and that:

"If there was a brawl…I would sign a resignation letter the next day…I respect myself very much, and frankly speaking, I still can’t handle all that filth that was undeservedly said about me"

=== ExoMars ===
Popovkin met with Jean-Jacques Dordain, Director General of the European Space Agency (ESA) to discuss about ExoMars in April 2012. The two men signed a memorandum of understanding which was to be followed by a formal agreement in November after further discussions on funding the missions.

== Awards ==
Decorated with orders For Distinguished Service to the Homeland 4th Class and For Distinguished Military Service with medal of Order For Distinguished Service to the Homeland 2nd Class, and with a number of medals. In 2005, Popovkin received Russian Government's Science and Technology Award.

== Personal ==
Popovkin had a brother, Vasily, three years his junior. He was married twice and had two daughters. He died of cancer on 18 June 2014 in Rabin Medical Center in Petah Tikva, Israel.

Government offices
Preceded by Anatoly Perminov	Director General of the Russian Federal Space Agency; 2011 – 2013	Succeeded by Oleg Ostapenko
Military offices
Preceded by Anatoly Perminov	Commander-in-Chief of the Russian Space Forces; 2004 – 2008	Succeeded by Oleg Ostapenko
