= General Director of Roscosmos =

General director of Roscosmos

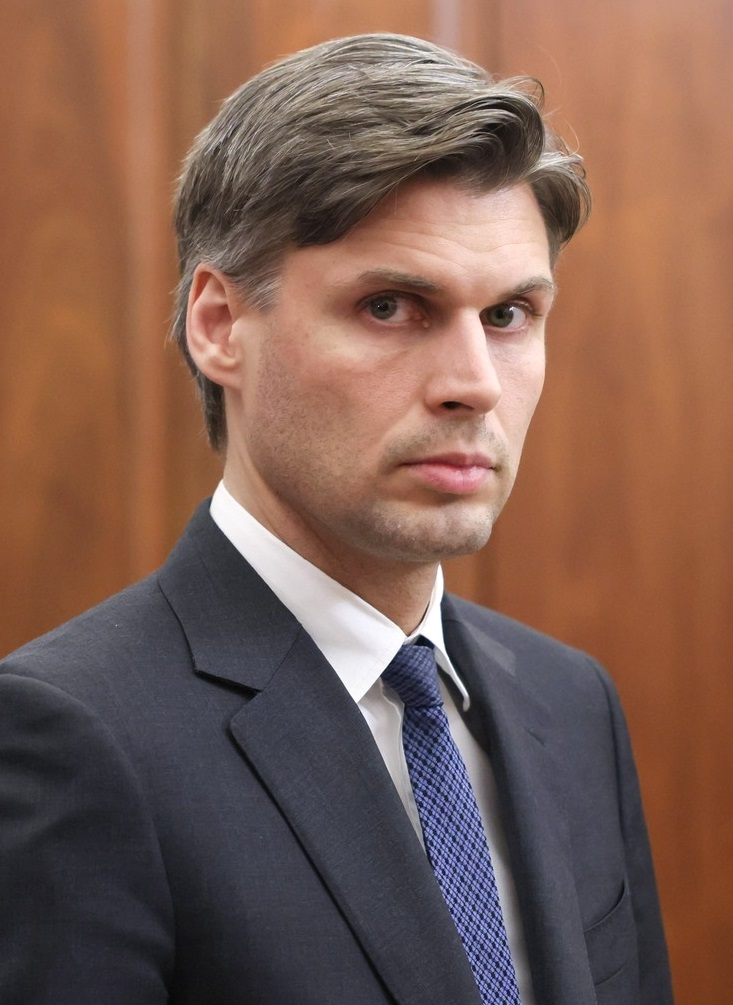
- Incumbent; Dmitry Bakanov since 6 February 2025
- Roscosmos
- Reports to: Prime Minister of Russia
- Seat: V.V. Tereshkova National Space Centre, Moscow
- Appointer: Prime Minister of Russia
- Term length: No fixed term
- Formation: February 25, 1992; 34 years ago
- First holder: Yuri Koptev

The general director of Roscosmos is the highest-ranked official of Roscosmos, the space agency of the Russian Federation. The director serves as the senior space science adviser to the President of Russia.

The first director was Yuri Koptev; who led the agency during a financial crisis, and established tourist flights to space, and was also the longest-running director, who held the post from 1992 to 2004.

The current director Dmitry Bakanov, was appointed by President Vladimir Putin on 6 February 2025.

== Directors ==
Photograph	Name	Term start	Term end
	Yuri Koptev	25 February 1992	11 March 2004
	Anatoly Perminov	12 March 2004	28 April 2011
	Vladimir Popovkin	29 April 2011	10 October 2013
	Oleg Ostapenko	10 October 2013	21 January 2015
	Igor Komarov	21 January 2015	24 May 2018
	Dmitry Rogozin	24 May 2018	15 July 2022
	Yury Borisov	15 July 2022	6 February 2025
	Dmitry Bakanov	6 February 2025	Incumbent

== See also ==
- Similar positions worldwide
  - Canada: President of the Canadian Space Agency
  - Europe: Director General of the European Space Agency
  - India: Chairman of ISRO
  - United States: Administrator of NASA
