= Yuri Koptev =

Russian aerospace engineer

- Юрий Коптев
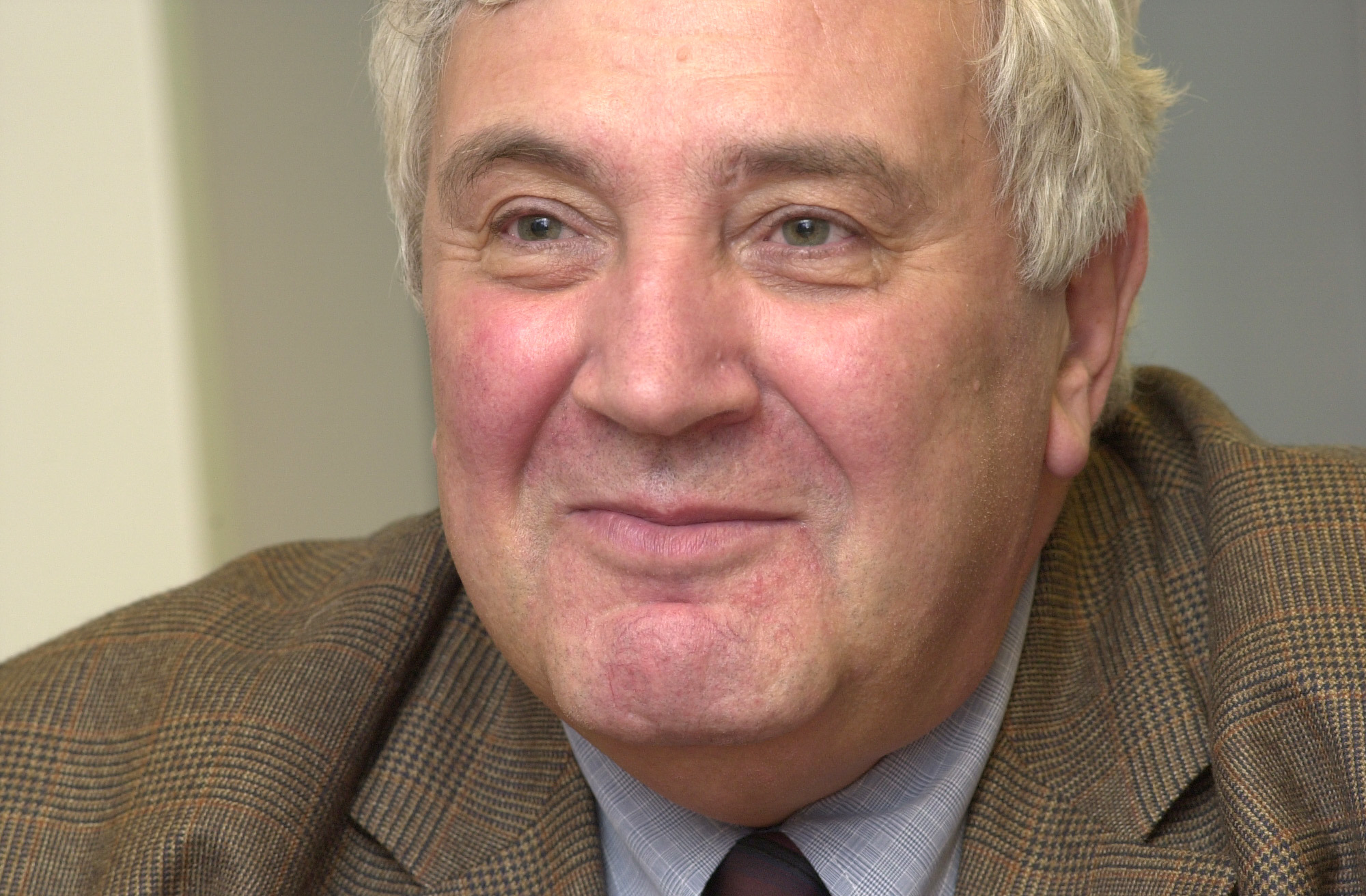
- Koptev in 2003
- Born: Yuri Nikolayevich Koptev; March 13, 1940 (age 86); Voroshilovsk, Russian SFSR, Soviet Union
- Occupation: Engineer
- Known for: General Director of the Russian Federal Space Agency

Yuri Nikolayevich Koptev (Russian: Юрий Николаевич Коптев, March 13, 1940) is a former General Director of the Russian Space Agency (now known as Roscosmos), serving in that role from 1992 to 2004. He was replaced in 2004 by Anatoly Perminov, a former commander of the Russian Space Forces. He has the federal state civilian service rank of 1st class Active State Councillor of the Russian Federation.

Beginning in 1965, he worked as an engineer at NPO Lavochkin.

Koptev is a Winner of the Golden Space Medal FAI (2000), a State Councillor of the Russian Federation, 1st class and was awarded the Order "For Merit to the Fatherland", 2nd and 3rd classes.

== Education ==
- 1957-1960 — Cadet of the Riga Civil Aviation Engineers Institute.
- 1960-1965 — A student of the Bauman Moscow State Technical University, graduated with a degree in mechanical engineering.

== International sanctions ==
On June 28, 2022, in connection with the ongoing Russian aggression in Ukraine, he was included in the US sanctions list as a person associated with an important state-owned company for the government and the military-technical complex of the Russian Federation - Rostec and the sanction list of the United Kingdom.

He was sanctioned by the UK government in 2023 in relation to the Russo-Ukrainian War.

Government offices
New title	Director General of the Russian Federal Space Agency; 1992 – 2004	Succeeded by Anatoly Perminov
