= Anatoly Perminov =

Russian engineer (born 1945)

- Анатолий Перминов
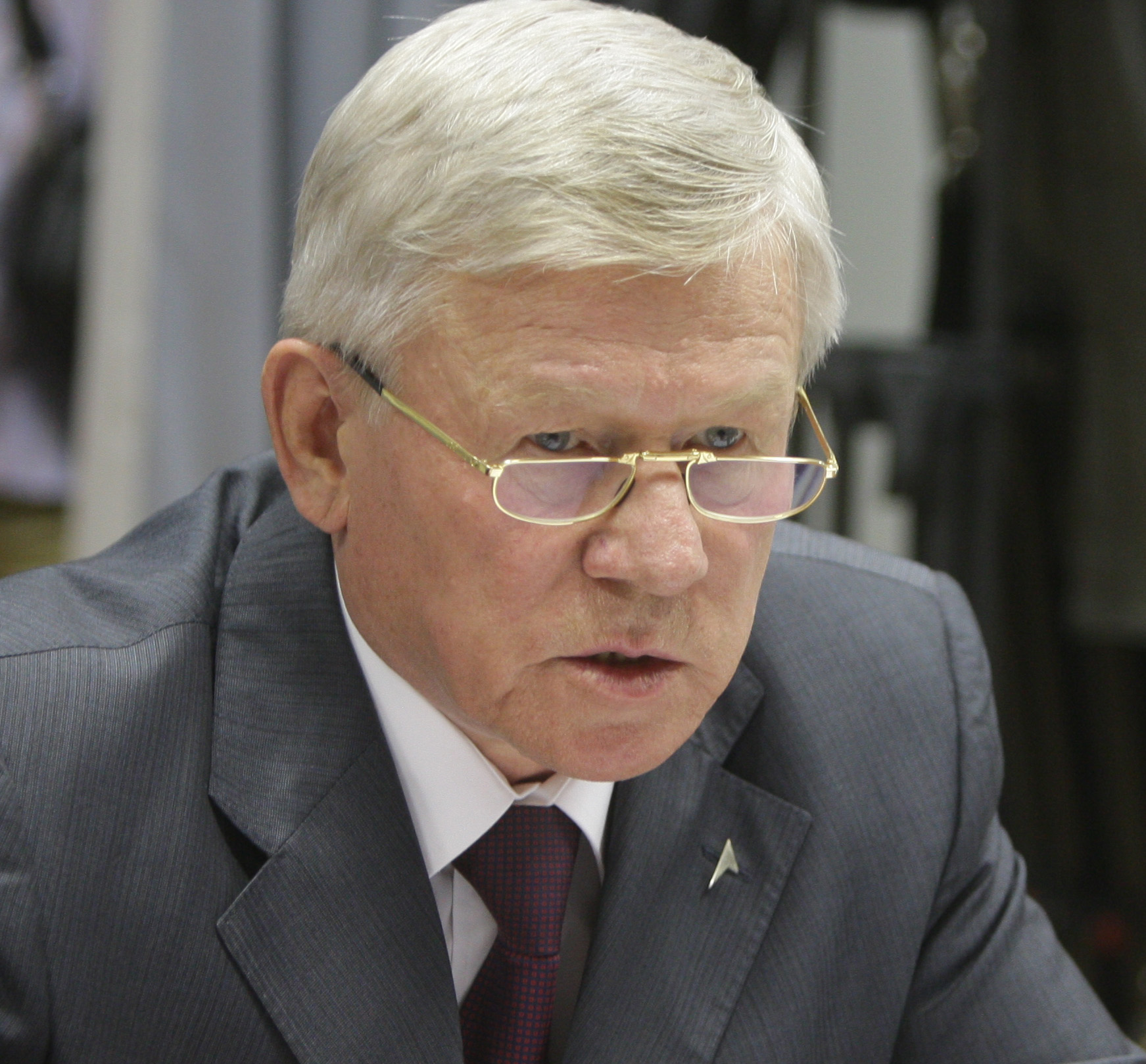
- Perminov in 2010
- Born: 16 June 1945 (age 81); Duvalovo, Kirov Oblast, Soviet Union (present-day Russia)
- Education: Dzerzhinsky Military Academy of Rocket Forces
- Known for: Russian Space Program; Rocket Technology
- Scientific career
- Fields: Mechanical engineering
- Workplaces: Russian Federal Space Agency; Moscow Aviation Institute
- Military career
- Allegiance: Soviet Union (to 1991); Russia
- Branch: Strategic Missile Forces
- Service years: 1967–2004
- Rank: Colonel general

Anatoly Nikolayevich Perminov (Russian: Анато́лий Никола́евич Пе́рминов; born 16 June 1945) is a Russian rocket scientist and mechanical engineer. He served as the General Director of Russian Federal Space Agency in 2004–2011. He has the federal state civilian service rank of 1st class Active State Councillor of the Russian Federation.

== Career ==
Anatoly Perminov graduated in 1967 from a military college with a degree in mechanical engineering, specializing in rocket engines. In 1976, he earned an advanced degree in Moscow from the Military Academy. In 1991 he again earned an advanced degree in Moscow from the Military Academy, after which he was appointed to the head of the Russian Department of Defense research test site. Here he organized the launch of hundreds of satellites and ICBMs. In August 1993 he became the head of operations for missile weapons in the Strategic Missile Forces. He was then the director of Roscosmos from March 2004 to 2011.

Perminov has a PhD in engineering, and has authored more than 70 scientific papers and articles on space exploration. He is a professor of the Moscow Aviation Institute, where he chairs the institute's Operations of Launch Vehicles and Spacecraft department.

On 29 April 2011, Perminov was replaced with Vladimir Popovkin as the director of Roscosmos. The 65-year-old Perminov was over the legal age limit for state officials, and had received some criticism after a failed GLONASS launch.

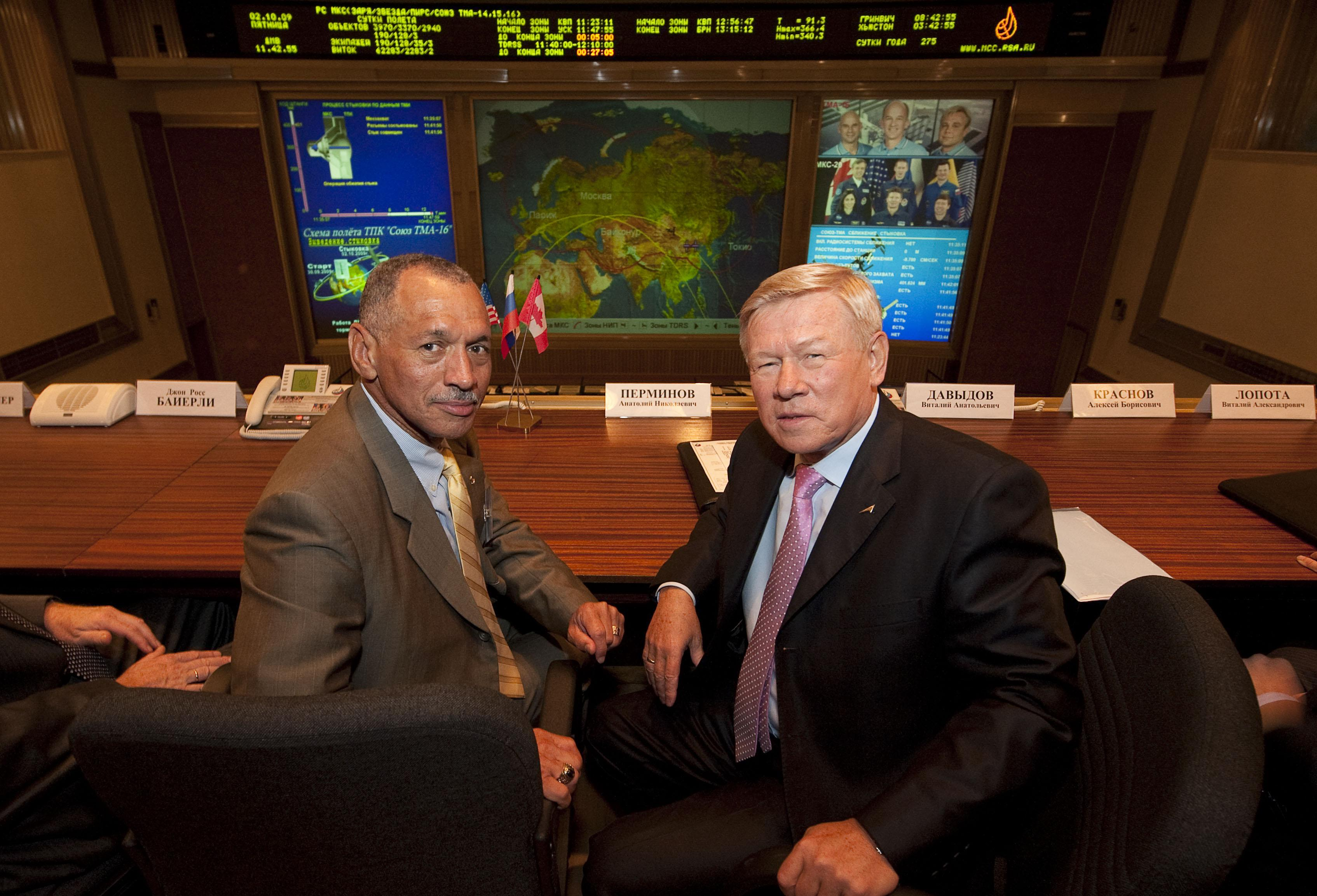
NASA administrator Charles Bolden meets Anatoly Perminov at Mission Control Centre Moscow in Korolyov, Russia.

== Personal life ==
Perminov is married. His wife is a teacher and they have a son.

== Honours and awards ==
- Order "For Merit to the Fatherland";
  - 3rd class (31 March 2009) - for outstanding contribution to the development of space industry and many years of fruitful activity
  - 4th class (25 September 2004) - for outstanding contribution to the development of the domestic space and strengthening the country's defense
- Order of Military Merit
- Order of the Red Banner of Labour
- Order "For Service to the Homeland in the Armed Forces of the USSR", 3rd class
- Honoured Engineer of the Russian Federation
- Gratitude of the President of Russia (2005) - for services in the development of space and many years of honest work
- Order Dostyk, 2nd class (Kazakhstan, 7 December 2004) - for his significant contribution to the development of friendship and cooperation between the peoples of Kazakhstan and Russia
- Officer of the Legion of Honour (France, 2010)
- Laureate of Russian Government for participation in the establishment of the carrier rocket Dnepr

Government offices
Preceded by Yuri Koptev	Director General of the Russian Federal Space Agency; 2004–2011	Succeeded by Vladimir Popovkin
Military offices
New title	Commander of the Russian Space Forces; 2001–2004	Succeeded by Vladimir Popovkin
Preceded by Nikolai Solovtsov (as First Deputy C-in-C); Vladimir Yakovlev (as Chief of the Main Staff)	Chief of the Main Staff and First Deputy Commander-in-Chief of the Strategic Rocket Forces; 1997–2001	Succeeded by Sergey Khutortsev (as Chief of Staff and First Deputy Commander)
