= Yury Borisov =

Russian politician (born 1956)

- Юрий Борисов
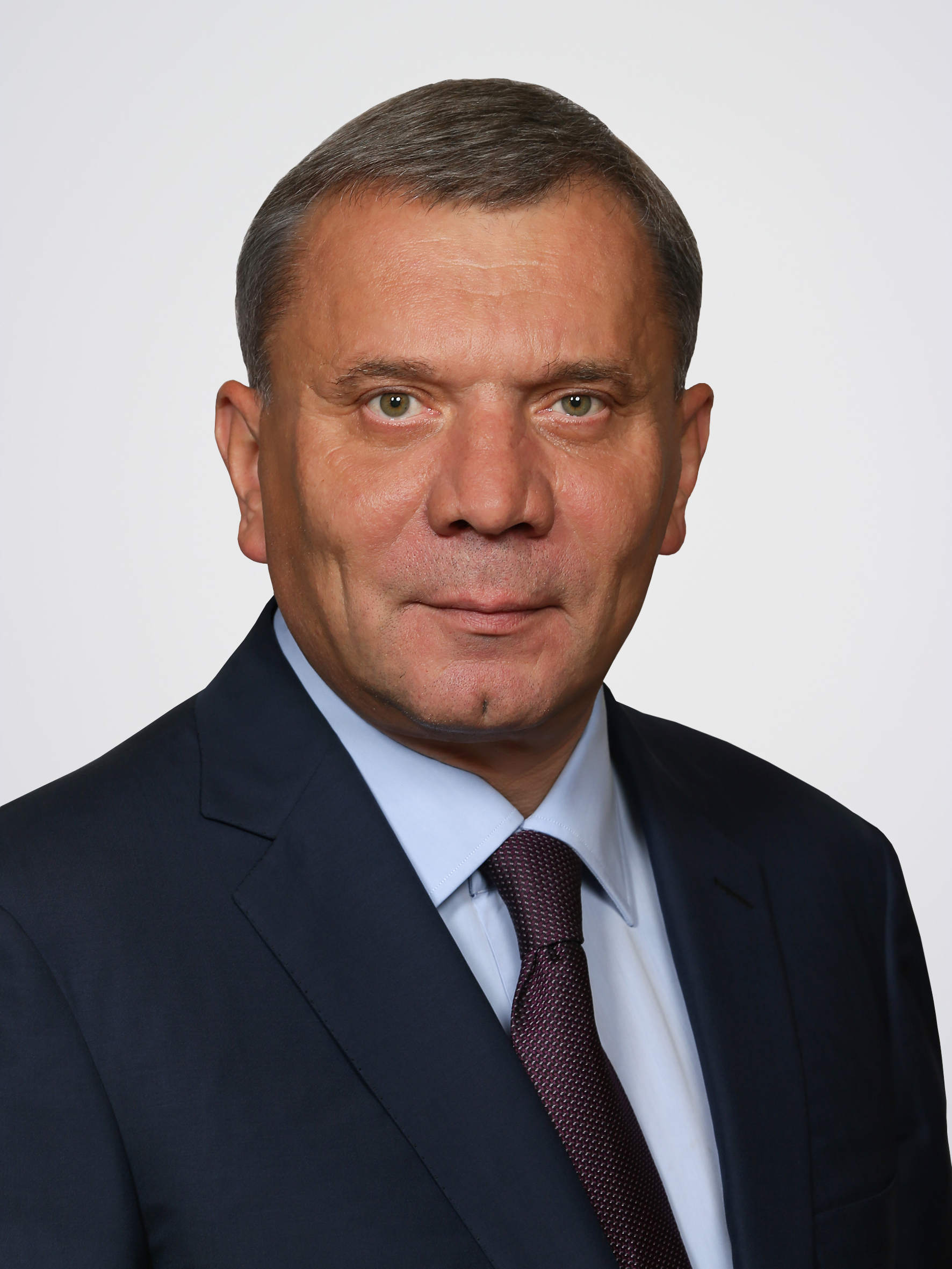
- Borisov in 2018

Senator from Arkhangelsk Oblast
- Incumbent
- Assumed office 19 May 2025 Serving with Ivan Novikov
- Preceded by: Alexander Nekrasov

Special Presidential Envoy on International Cooperation in Space
- In office 18 February 2025 – 19 May 2025
- President: Vladimir Putin
- Preceded by: Sergei Krikalev
- Succeeded by: Sergei Krikalev

General Director of Roscosmos
- In office 15 July 2022 – 6 February 2025
- President: Vladimir Putin
- Preceded by: Dmitry Rogozin
- Succeeded by: Dmitry Bakanov

Deputy Prime Minister of Russia for Defence and Space Industry
- In office 18 May 2018 – 15 July 2022
- Prime Minister: Dmitry Medvedev; Mikhail Mishustin
- Preceded by: Dmitry Rogozin
- Succeeded by: Denis Manturov

Deputy Minister of Defence
- In office 15 November 2012 – 18 May 2018
- Minister: Sergey Shoygu

Personal details
- Born: December 31, 1956 (age 69) Vyshny Volochyok, Kalinin Oblast, Soviet Union (now Russia)
- Party: Independent
- Education: Moscow State University
- Awards: Hero of the Russian Federation; Order for Service to the Homeland in the Armed Forces of the USSR

Military service
- Allegiance: Soviet Union; Russia
- Branch/service: Armed Forces of the Russian Federation
- Years of service: 1974–1998; 2012–2018
- Rank: Class 1 Active State Advisor of the Russian Federation

Yury Ivanovich Borisov (Russian: Юрий Иванович Борисов; born 31 December 1956) is a Russian politician, former military strategist, and mathematician currently serving as Federation Council Senator from Arkhangelsk Oblast.

Borisov served as General Director of Roscosmos from 2022 to 2025, from 2018 to 2022, he served as the Deputy Prime Minister of Russia, and from 2012 to 2018, as the Deputy Minister of Defence. He has been awarded the title of Hero of the Russian Federation and is a recipient of the Order for Service to the Homeland in the Armed Forces of the USSR, 3rd degree.

He has the federal state civilian service rank of 1st class Active State Councillor of the Russian Federation.

== Biography ==
Yury Borisov was born on 31 December 1956 in Vyshny Volochyok. He graduated from Kalinin Suvorov Military School in 1974 and from Radioelectronics Higher Command School in 1978. In 1980s he studied mathematics at the Faculty of Computational Mathematics and Cybernetics of Moscow State University from which he graduated in 1985. Borisov is married and has two children. For 20 years from 1978 to 1998 he was enlisted into the Armed Forces of both the Soviet Union and Russia. He was Federal Agency on Industry deputy head in October 2007 and became Deputy Minister of Industry and Trade in July 2008. He was a Military-Industrial Commissioner for Russia in March 2011 and as of 12 November 2012 under Presidential Decree, Borisov was promoted to Deputy Minister of Defence of the Russian Federation.

On 7 May 2018, Borisov was nominated as Deputy Prime Minister for Defence and Space Industry in Dmitry Medvedev's Second Cabinet.

On 15 January 2020, Borisov resigned as part of Medvedev's cabinet, after President Vladimir Putin delivered the 2020 Presidential Address to the Federal Assembly, in which he proposed several amendments to the constitution. Borisov was subsequently confirmed in his former position by Medvedev's successor, Mikhail Mishustin.

In 2021 he was awarded the Order of the Republic of Serbia.

In 2022, he replaced Dmitry Rogozin as the new Director General of Roscosmos.

Borisov was replaced as Roscosmos head by Gonets head Dmitry Bakanov in early February 2025, with the Kremlin saying that it was part of a "planned rotation". Later that month President Putin appointed Borisov his Special Envoy on International Cooperation in Space, replacing cosmonaut Sergei Krikalev.

On May 19, 2025, Governor of Arkhangelsk Oblast Alexander Tsybulsky appointed Yury Borisov to the vacant Federation Council seat, left open by the resignation of Senator Alexander Nekrasov in January 2025. Borisov's predecessor as Roskosmos general director Dmitry Rogozin had also served in the Federation Council, representing Zaporozhye Oblast since September 2023. In the chamber Borisov decided to join the Committee on Defense and Security.

=== Sanctions ===
Borisov was sanctioned by Canada under the Special Economic Measures Act (S.C. 1992, c. 17) in relation to the Russian invasion of Ukraine for Grave Breach of International Peace and Security.

== See also ==
- List of Heroes of the Russian Federation
