= Dmitry Bakanov =

Russian economist

- Дмитрий Баканов
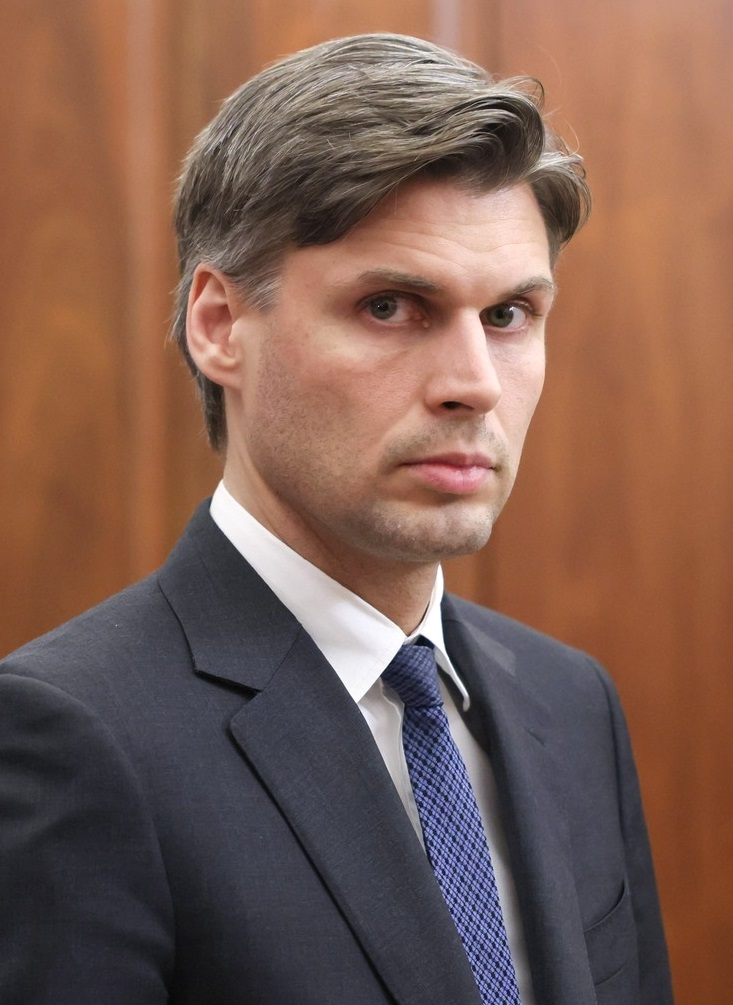
- Bakanov in 2025

General Director of Roscosmos
- Incumbent
- Assumed office 6 February 2025
- President: Vladimir Putin
- Preceded by: Yury Borisov

Deputy Minister of Transport
- In office 26 April 2022 – 6 February 2025
- Prime Minister: Mikhail Mishustin
- Succeeded by: Andrey Nikitin

Personal details
- Born: October 7, 1985 (age 40) Leninsk, Kazakh SSR, Soviet Union
- Education: Saint Petersburg State University of Economics

Dmitry Vladimirovich Bakanov (Russian: Дми́трий Влади́мирович Бака́нов, 7 October 1985) is a Russian economist who has been the General Director of Roscosmos, the Russian space agency, since 2025. Before that he was the deputy minister of transport from 2022 to 2025 and the head of Gonets from 2011 to 2019.

== Biography ==
Bakanov was born on 7 October 1985 in Leninsk (now Baikonur), Kazakh Soviet Socialist Republic, the home of Baikonur Cosmodrome, the primary manned launch site of the Soviet Union. He graduated in 2007 from the Saint Petersburg State University of Economics with a degree in economics. From 2006, he worked at several banks as a financial analyst and auditor. In 2008 he worked at the company Sitronics in the internal audit department before moving to its procurement department.

In September 2011 he became the president of Gonets, a satellite operating company, and in October 2016 he became the director, remaining in that role until May 2019. Starting from August 2019, Bakanov began working in the Ministry of Transport in several roles. On 26 April 2022 he was appointed the Deputy Minister of Transport. On 6 February 2025, Bakanov was appointed as General Director of Roscosmos, Russia's space agency.
