= List of accidents and incidents involving the International Space Station =

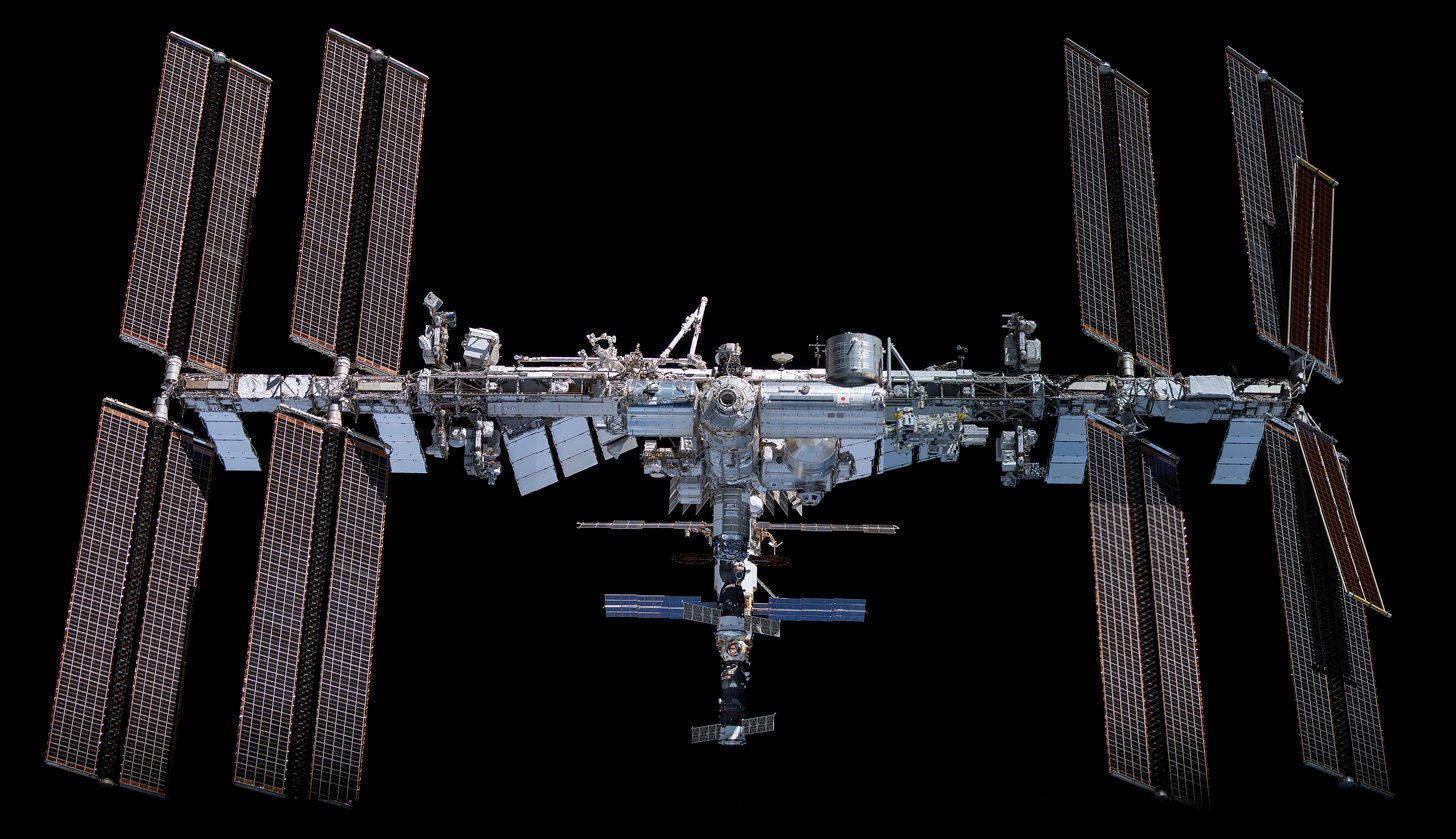
The International Space Station, as seen by a visiting spacecraft in 2021.

This article is a list of accidents and incidents related to the International Space Station (ISS). It includes mishaps occurring on board the ISS, flights to and from the space station, as well as other program related incidents. Excluded from the list are routine actions such as repairs of minor malfunctions or debris avoidance maneuvers.

== List ==
=== 2001 ===
- November 28: Progress M1-7 cargo spacecraft failed to perform hard docking due to debris on the docking ring left by Progress M-45. During an unscheduled spacewalk on December 3 the foreign object was inspected and removed, finally allowing Progress M1-7 to complete the docking procedures.

=== 2003 ===
- May 4: Soyuz TMA-1 switched to a ballistic reentry during descent, resulting in landing about 460 kilometres (290 mi) from target. The crew inside the spacecraft experienced increased acceleration, still within limits even for untrained people. Technical commission concluded the cause to be incorrect behaviour of descent control system leading to yaw angle exceeding the limits, which triggered the switch to ballistic mode. As the time of publishing of this report, the performed simulations were unable to replicate this scenario, although design evaluations revealed a very unlikely combination of input signals could lead to underlying failures.

=== 2004 ===
- February 27: Despite completing the main objective of VKD-9 spacewalk, it was terminated early due to a cooling system malfunction in Aleksandr Kaleri's spacesuit. A post-spacewalk inspection showed disruption of the cooling water flow caused by pinching of a coolant tube as the cause of the malfunction. Remaining planned activities were moved to a later spacewalk.
- June 24: VKD-9a spacewalk was cut short after the primary oxygen bottle in the spacesuit of Mike Fincke began losing pressure at a high rate almost immediately after exiting the hatch. Total length of the spacewalk was 14 minutes 22 seconds. The cause of malfunction was determined to be open oxygen flow switch that was not fully seated in normal flow position. In order to avoid such an incident, spacewalk procedures were updated with additional checks of valves' positions. The spacewalk was rescheduled to June 30.
- August 3: During Expedition 9 EVA-3 spacewalk, the ISS lost its attitude control and drifted 80 degrees off the nominal attitude. Resulting power conservation procedures lead to a loss of primary S-band communication between the astronauts and the ground crew. No personnel were inside the station at the time. In order to use the Service Module thrusters to regain correct attitude, the crew had to move away from it and only returned after realignment 45 minutes later. Due to this incident, mission control adjusted attitude control planning and power conservation measures for the future EVAs.

=== 2005 ===
- July 28: Two gap fillers protruding between the shuttle's heat shield tiles were photographed during the Rendezvous pitch maneuver of STS-114 ahead of docking to the space station. On some of the previous missions, similar protrusions resulted in increased heating and tile damage. After careful considerations, NASA decided to remove those gap fillers during an upcoming spacewalk. The task was performed on EVA-3 on August 3 without issues. Additional spacewalk was considered to deal with a damaged thermal blanket near the shuttle cockpit window, but was ultimately determined as unnecessary based on analysis and wind tunnel tests.

=== 2006 ===
- October 26: During docking of Progress M-58 orientation antenna failed to fully retract. The spacecraft physically connected to the station but mission control delayed hard docking by over 4 hours while working to reduce the risks of failed antenna hitting elements of Zvezda service module. To ensure it will not interfere during undocking, several attempts of retracting the antenna took place during two spacewalks of Expedition 14. After they failed, the supporting strut was cut, allowing partial retracting.

=== 2007 ===
- June 8: During the launch of STS-117/13A a part of thermal insulation blanket on the orbiter orbital maneuvering system pod peeled off from adjacent thermal tiles. It was adjusted into position and stapled during the EVA-3 spacewalk on June 15.
- August 15: EVA-3 spacewalk of STS-118/13A.1 mission was terminated early after a hole was found in second layer of Rick Mastracchio's EMU glove during periodic inspection. The hole didn't lead to any leaks as spacesuit consists of five layers and termination was a precautionary measure. The hole was determined to be a cut caused by a sharp edge.
- October 21: Failure of Instrumentation/Propulsion Module commanded separation from the Descent Module of Soyuz TMA-10 during return to Earth resulted in ballistic reentry with higher loads on the crew than normal. The same issue will occur during the next Soyuz TMA landing.

=== 2008 ===
- April 19: Landing of Soyuz TMA-11 was performed in ballistic mode, resulting in touchdown 420 km away from the nominal site. Later analysis showed the cause was separation failure between Instrumentation and Propulsion Module and Descent Module due to issues with pyro bolts that start the separation. The issue was similar to the previous Soyuz landing, but with higher g-force of almost 8.5g and lower separation altitude of 60–66 kilometres (37–41 mi). While the crew was initially reported to be healthy, spaceflight participant Yi So-Yeon was later hospitalized due to mild dislocation and bruising of vertebrae. NASA simulations showed that in the worst case such scenarios could lead to loss of crew due to failure of hatch or parachute cover. As a result, during Soyuz TMA-12’s stay on the ISS, an unplanned EVA was performed on July 10 to remove one of the pyro bolts from the spacecraft for inspection on the ground. Additionally, a software patch was introduced on TMA-12 to position the vehicle sideways for faster burn-through of the truss structure connecting the modules in case their separation fails in the future. Failure of the pyro bolts on the two flights was determined to be due to electromagnetic environment while in orbit. Design of the separation system was reworked accordingly.
- November 20: As EVA-2 spacewalk of STS-126/ULF2 was wrapping up, Shane Kimbrough's spacesuit sensors showed carbon dioxide buildup above safe limits. He was commanded to terminate his spacewalk and return to the airlock as a precaution. Kimbrough encountered increased CO_{2} levels on EVA-4 of the mission as well and took periodic rests to control it.

=== 2009 ===
- March 12: Space station crew took shelter in their Soyuz due to a risk of collision with debris that was discovered too late for performing avoidance maneuvering. The piece of debris was a 12 centimetres (4.7 in) fragment of a spent US rocket stage. The distance to the station during the closest approach was around 5 kilometres (3.1 mi), after it passed the crewmembers returned to their regular work. As this was the first time such a procedure was executed, it caused disagreements between Moscow and Houston Mission Control on whether the hatches should be closed. After the event, the procedure was adjusted to close the hatches in case of other such emergencies.
- July 22: During EVA-3 spacewalk of STS-127/21A mission CO_{2} removal system in Chris Cassidy's spacesuit malfunctioned resulting in increasing carbon dioxide levels. Although the increased levels were still within the normal limits and Cassidy didn't experience any hypercapnia symptoms, the spacewalk was terminated early as a precaution. Due to termination, a battery pack was left in unintended configuration, requiring additional exercise restrictions to avoid unwanted vibrations until the next spacewalk.

=== 2010 ===
- July 2: Docking of the Progress M-06M cargo spacecraft was aborted due to automated system issue. The failure was traced to TV transmitter of manual rendezvous system TORU interfering with the TORU itself, causing a loss of connection and abort command. Consequently, TORU was disabled on the next docking attempt on July 4 which was successful.
- September 23: Multiple unsuccessful attempts of undocking Soyuz TMA-18 due to issues with the docking system on the Poisk module. A sensor was reporting incorrect information preventing the docking latches to be released. After several hours of attempts, undocking was postponed to the next day, while the crew returned to the station. Electrical jumpers were installed to mimic the correct signal, which allowed undocking to be performed without problems on September 24. The issue was later traced back to a broken gear found during the troubleshooting efforts.

=== 2011 ===
- June 28: An unknown piece of debris passed within 260 metres (850 ft) of the station. As it was discovered too late to perform avoidance maneuvers, the crew had to board their Soyuz spacecraft as a precaution. As no collision took place, the crew was allowed to return to regular activities after the time of closest approach.
- August 24: Progress M-12M cargo spacecraft failed to reach orbit due to early shutdown of the third stage engines of Soyuz-U. At the time of the incident, Progress was the only operational ISS resupply spacecraft. Due to commonality between the third stages, Soyuz-FG, the only launch vehicle capable of carrying crew at the time, was also grounded, creating risk of having to leave ISS in uncrewed configuration. The failure was attributed to a human-caused blocking fuel line inside of RD-0110 engine. With a successful launch of Progress M-13M to the ISS on October 30, Soyuz-FG was cleared to launch crew again, which ultimately prevented de-crewing of the station.

=== 2012 ===
- March 24: A piece of debris from a prior satellite collision was discovered too late to perform avoidance maneuvers, requiring space station crew to shelter in their Soyuz spacecraft as a precaution. The distance at closest approach was around 11 kilometres (6.8 mi), after which the crew continued their regular duties.

=== 2013 ===
- March 1: Shortly after separation from the second stage, three of the four thrusters on CRS-2 Dragon cargo spacecraft failed to activate due to insufficient pressure in the tanks. The loss of attitude control also prevented solar arrays deployment, which was later commanded manually during the troubleshooting process. Cycling the valves for a "pressure slamming" effect cleared the blockage in pressurant lines bringing all the thrusters to operation without further issues later in the mission. A key orbital maneuver had to be rescheduled due to the long troubleshooting process, resulting in docking delayed by one day.
- July 16: 44 minutes into EVA-23 spacewalk ESA astronaut Luca Parmitano reported a large amount of water inside his helmet, minutes after a CO_{2} sensor failure. By the time Luca made it to the airlock, water was covering his eyes, nose and ears. The incident resulted in no injury but was later declared a high-visibility close call. The cause of the issue was determined to be contamination clogging a Fan Pump Separator, disrupting the water flow and leading it into the helmet. The issue had actually started on the previous spacewalk but was falsely attributed to a leaking drink bag and dismissed.

=== 2014 ===
- March 25: Initial attempt of docking 6 hours after launch of Soyuz TMA-12M was cancelled after one of the scheduled burns didn't happen. Overperformance of the Soyuz-FG launch vehicle, while still within limits, changed the requirements for the burn, requiring a switch to less powerful orientation thrusters instead of main engine. A possible software issue, together with incorrect orientation of the vehicle, resulted in burn not happening. Docking was rescheduled to a backup 2-day rendezvous process which worked without further issues.
- October 28: The Cygnus Orb-3 cargo spacecraft fails to orbit after its Antares rocket explodes. An uncontained failure in one of the rocket's NK-33 first stage engines caused the vehicle to collapse back on the launch pad, destroying the rocket, spacecraft, and cargo, as well as causing significant damage to the launch complex. No personnel were injured in the incident.

=== 2015 ===
- April 28: Shortly after separation from the launch vehicle, contact was lost with Progress M-27M cargo spacecraft. Attempts to reestablish two-way communications weren't successful, but downlinked video from the spacecraft showed it rapidly spinning in orbit. Similar to earlier Progress M-12M failure, crewed Soyuz flights were also paused, which led to Soyuz TMA-15M undocking and landing delayed by a month and other schedule adjustments. The failure was determined to be caused by a flawed design of connection between Progress and the third stage of the rocket, which sent the cargo spacecraft into a spin after an abnormal separation. Progress spacecraft reentered the atmosphere on May 8.
- June 28: The SpaceX CRS-7 Dragon cargo spacecraft fails to orbit after its Falcon 9 rocket disintegrates 139 seconds in flight. A helium COPV on the second stage had broken free of its mounting point, causing an overpressure event that burst the second stage; the Dragon spacecraft and rocket debris impacted the ocean moments later and were destroyed. An investigation traced the fault to a defective stainless steel bolt that failed at one-fifth of its design load, which SpaceX did not properly qualify for performance under cryogenic temperatures. An International Docking Adapter necessary for future American crew flights to the space station was among the cargo lost, a replacement was manufactured from spare components.
- July 16: Station crew had to close the module hatches and take shelter in their Soyuz TMA-16M spacecraft as a precaution in case of a collision with the debris of an old Soviet satellite. The object was noticed too late to perform a debris avoidance maneuver. As the closest approach time passed without issues, the crewmembers returned to their planned activities.

=== 2016 ===
- January 15: US EVA-35 spacewalk was terminated early due to water bubble forming in Tim Kopra's helmet. After examining the affected space suit to Earth, the likely cause was determined to be blockage of "slurper tubes" that return excess water from the sublimator to the cooling loop. The amount of water released was small enough to be considered a non-hazard.
- December 1: Progress MS-04 cargo spacecraft didn't reach orbit due to failure of Soyuz-U third stage. The spacecraft successfully separated from the failed launch vehicle and started post-launch operations but fell back to Earth. The failed launch wasn't critical for supplies and maintenance of the station. The failure was traced to several possible issues with the turbopump of RD-0110 engine on the third stage, which in turn caused failure of the oxidizer tank. As a result, Progress MS-05 was delayed by three weeks to replace third stage engines on its launch vehicle.

=== 2017 ===
- March 12: During prebreath ahead of US EVA-42 spacewalk, a water leak was discovered in a service cooling umbilical of Jack Fischer's spacesuit. The remaining operational SCU had to be shared between the two astronauts, which impacted spacesuit battery capacity and shortened the spacewalk.
- April 10: During descent to Earth of Soyuz MS-02 crewed spacecraft, a part of the parachute system hit the capsule during deployment, causing partial depressurization at the altitude of about 8 kilometres (5.0 mi), 3 kilometres (1.9 mi) higher than during normal operations. As the crew were wearing pressure suits, the loss of pressure didn't lead to any further issues.
- June 14: Soyuz rocket debris resulting from the launch of Progress MS-06 spacecraft started a fire at the impact site. Due to a combination of weather factors, it turned into a blaze leading to deaths of two workers working on debris recovery. Additional impact site inspections before and after the launch were introduced to prevent such accidents in the future.

=== 2018 ===
- August 29: An air leak caused by a 2 mm hole was discovered in the docked Soyuz MS-09 spacecraft. Astronauts initially patched the leak with Kapton tape, and later sealed with an epoxy patch. A spacewalk was performed on December 11 to cut through the insulation layer on the outside of the spacecraft for inspections and sample retrieval. Russian officials accused NASA astronaut Serena Auñón-Chancellor of boring the hole, a claim described by Ars Technica as "preposterous" and "a complete fabrication".
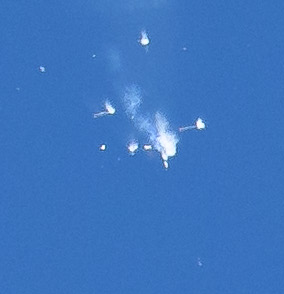
  Soyuz MS-10 rocket shortly after disintegration
- October 11: The Soyuz MS-10 crew mission failed to orbit after its booster disintegrates in flight. Astronauts Aleksey Ovchinin and Nick Hague were saved by the spacecraft's launch escape system, and land 402 km (250 mi) downrange in Kazakhstan.

=== 2019 ===
- Unspecified date: During investigation of blood flow in spaceflight environment that was published in 2019, an unidentified astronaut was discovered to have a jugular vein blood clot. The discovery took place 2 months into the mission with no symptoms experienced prior to it. After careful considerations, blood thinners were used for most of the rest of the mission. Between 1 and 10 days after landing, the blood clot had disappeared completely with no symptoms. Additional testing was performed on later missions, and as of May 2022 no other astronauts were found to have the same condition.
- April 20: A SpaceX Dragon crew capsule exploded during ground testing of its launch abort system. The delay injured no personnel but resulted in delays to timelines of the spacecraft's first crewed flight.
- August 23: News media report on an incident where astronaut Anne McClain was accused of illegally accessing her divorced spouse Summer Worden's bank accounts while on board the station. The accusations were false and Worden was later indicted for lying to authorities, she pleaded guilty in 2025.
- August 24: Due to malfunctioning amplifier on the Poisk docking port, the uncrewed Soyuz MS-14 spacecraft failed to lock on the target and started swaying in different directions, unable to determine its relative position. As Soyuz spacecraft lack TORU remote control system and there was no crew on board, the docking had to be aborted. While initially the plan was to swap the amplifier, Soyuz MS-13 was relocated and manually docked to Poisk module on August 26. On August 27 MS-14 performed automatic docking with the now available Zvezda aft port with a functioning amplifier..
- December 20: The Boeing Orbital Flight Test, an uncrewed flight test of the Boeing Starliner crew spacecraft, was successfully launched but experienced several technical issues in orbit related to an erroneously configured mission timer. The planned docking attempt to the ISS was called off and the spacecraft landed in New Mexico two days later. Boeing would conduct a repeat mission on its own funds two years later.

=== 2021 ===
- April 21: During the pre-docking coast phase a late conjunction notice was announced in Crew-2 Dragon capsule. At the time, its crew was in presleep period but had to switch into their suits and prepare for potential collision as a precaution. After the time of closest approach passed, they went back to regular activities. Later analysis showed the approaching object wasn't a physical object but a dummy satellite used internally by Space Force in their database. The conjunction message was then erroneously delivered to NASA.
- July 29: The recently docked Nauka space station module experienced a computer glitch that caused it to fire its thrusters, causing the space station to be rotated end-over-end one and a half times; a "spacecraft emergency" was called for the first time in the history of the program by flight director Zebulon Scoville. Attitude control was only regained after the errant module had completely depleted its fuel reserves. The module had experienced technical issues related to its propulsion prior to docking with the ISS. The uncrewed Boe-OFT2 Starliner mission would be delayed 96 hours due to the incident, but later would be cancelled entirely after the Starliner's valves were found to be faulty.
- October 15: Soyuz MS-18 engine kept firing longer than expected during testing while docked to the space station. It resulted in station turning 57 degrees off the nominal attitude and beginning of emergency procedures. Orientation was restored about 30 minutes later without other issues.
- November 15: Russia conducts an anti-satellite missile test and shatters the Kosmos 1408 spacecraft into a cloud of thousands of debris fragments, endangering the International Space Station and other spacecraft. All crew aboard the ISS were ordered to don spacesuits and proceed to their respective return spacecraft in the event that the ISS were to be struck by debris and depressurized. In June 2022, the space station executed a maneuver to dodge a debris fragment from the destroyed satellite.

=== 2022 ===
- March 22: Following the conclusion of US EVA-80 spacewalk, water was discovered inside the of helmet of Matthias Maurer's spacesuit. US spacewalks were halted for seven months until the investigation concluded that water buildup was a result of condensation caused by high astronaut exertion and cooling settings, rather than a hardware failure. Procedures were updated to minimized such scenarios.
- May 19: During orbital insertion burn on Boeing Orbital Flight Test 2, a repeat of a previous test flight, two of the spacecraft's maneuvering thrusters failed during orbital insertion burn due to drop in chamber pressure. Two smaller RCS thrusters also failed during ISS rendezvous operations, but later recovered. Due to redundancies in both thruster systems, the spacecraft was still able to dock to the station and then successfully land 4 days later. Issues with OMAC thrusters were likely caused by debris in an undetermined area. The temporary failure of RCS thrusters was initially blamed on low inlet pressure that could be mitigated by adjustments of timing and tolerances but the same issue would repeat during Crew Flight Test in June 2024.
- August 17: Russian VKD-54 spacewalk was terminated early due to abnormal battery readings of Oleg Artemyev's spacesuit. Both participating cosmonauts returned to the airlock without further problems, the remaining tasks were completed during the next spacewalk.
- November 7: During the launch of Cygnus NG-18 cargo spacecraft, debris from the acoustic blanket of Antares launch vehicle got stuck in one of the solar arrays mechanisms, preventing it from being fully deployed. The one operational solar array was enough to power the spacecraft, and after consideration NASA allowed the spacecraft to rendezvous and be berthed to the ISS. No further issues occurred because of this failure.

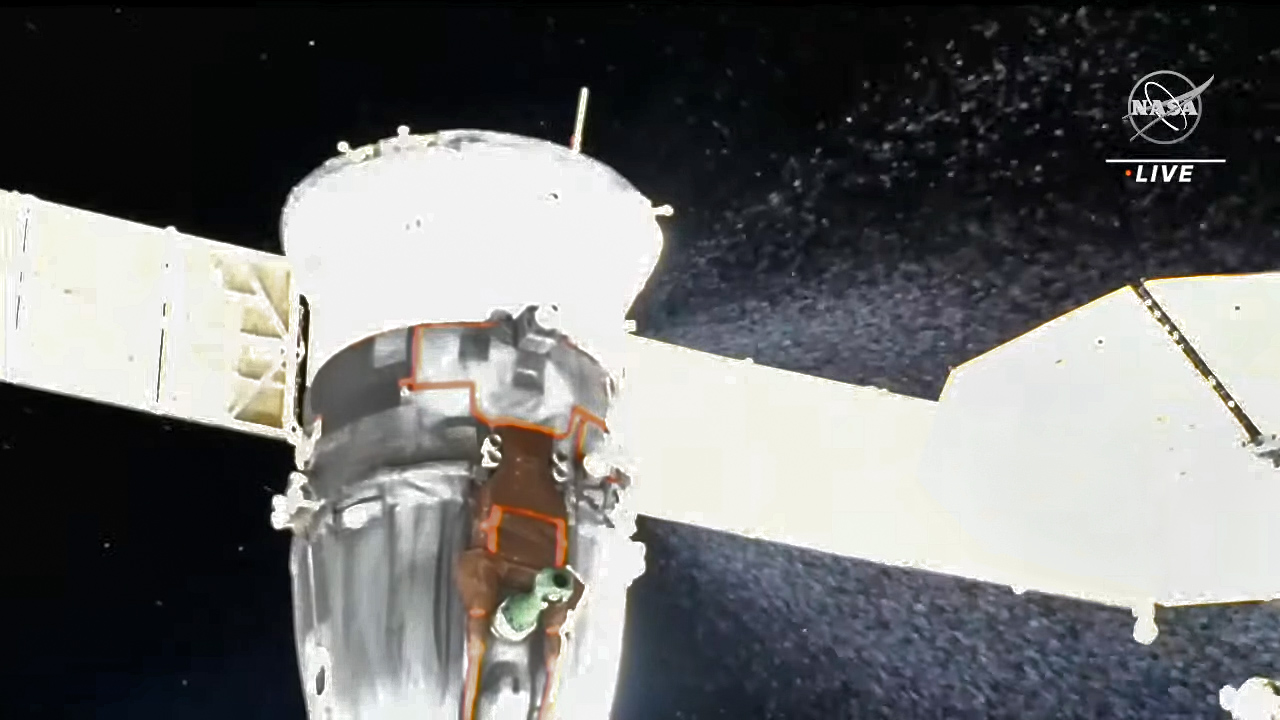
Soyuz MS-22 spacecraft leaking coolant as seen on NASA TV livestream

- December 14: Soyuz MS-22 spacecraft sprung a leak in external cooling loop of the service module. The leak was determined to be caused by a micrometeoroid impact. The spacecraft stayed docked as an emergency rescue vehicle but was deemed not viable for a normal crew return. As a result, Soyuz MS-23 was launched without crew as a replacement in February, while MS-22 undocked and landed without the crew on March 28. The mission of the crew was extended and they returned on September 27 on Soyuz MS-23, setting the record of the longest US spaceflight.

=== 2023 ===
- February 11: Progress MS-21 spacecraft sprung a leak in external cooling loop of the service module. The leak was determined to be caused by a micrometeoroid impact. The leak area was inspected using Canadarm2 as well as photographs taken after undocking. The incident resulted in a delay of Soyuz MS-23 launch, needed to replace Soyuz MS-22 that had a leak several months prior.
- March 3: During approach of Crew-6 to the ISS a faulty sensor on the Dragon capsule indicated one of the docking hooks was not open, pausing the docking process. One day prior, a similar erroneous signal led to usage of backup motors to deploy the nosecone shortly after reaching orbit. The hook was determined to be operational so a software override was used for the faulty sensor, resulting in successful docking about 2.5 hours later than the original plan.
- October 9: A leak from one of Nauka Multipurpose Laboratory Module radiators was observed with the ISS cameras and visual inspections. The origin of the leak was Nauka's backup radiator while the primary radiator continued working as normal. The radiator system was first delivered to the ISS in 2010 and installed in April 2023. As a result of the incident, the two NASA spacewalks have been postponed. During Roscosmos spacewalk on October 25 the backup radiator was isolated and inspected. During inspection a bubble of coolant liberated from the leak area, causing additional precautions at the end of the spacewalk to avoid contaminating the ISS environment.

=== 2024 ===
- March 8: A 0.7 kilograms (1.5 lb) piece of space junk that survived reentry has impacted a house in Naples, Florida. No people were harmed. NASA later confirmed the object to be an inconel stanchion that was a part of a cargo pallet with old batteries jettisoned from the ISS in March 2021. The pallets were originally planned to be safely disposed of with an HTV spacecraft that delivered the replacement batteries to the space station, but Exposed Pallet brought by HTV-7 was left on the ISS due to Soyuz MS-10 launch failure affecting spacewalk schedules. After the final HTV flight one pallet remained on the ISS, and it was jettisoned from the ISS after being estimated to burn up completely on reentry.
- June 6: During the coast phase of Boeing Crew Flight Test mission two helium leaks in Starliner pressurization system have been found, in addition to one known before the launch. Throughout the docking process, five of the RCS thrusters failed, prompting the docking to be delayed until four of them came online after several resets. This failure was similar to issues that occurred during OFT-2 in May 2022, despite software fixes designed to prevent them. Two more helium leaks were later discovered while the spacecraft was docked to the station. The ongoing leaks and thruster issues lead to undocking being postponed indefinitely, to give more time for analysis as well as both ground and on-orbit tests. The ground tests revealed the likely cause of thruster failure to be a Teflon seal bulging due to overheating and restricting propellant flow, resulting in loss of thrust. Despite attempts to refine modeling of this behavior, the uncertainty was deemed to be too high for a crewed return, prompting NASA to announce on August 24 that Starliner capsule will be returned uncrewed. The mission crew continued their work as a part of Expedition 71/72 and returned with SpaceX Crew-9, that was launched with two crew members instead of planned four, on March 18 2025, overstaying their planned mission duration by 85 days.
- June 24: US EVA-90 spacewalk lasted for only 31 minutes due to a water leak in the umbilical unit connected to Tracy Dyson's spacesuit shortly after opening the airlock hatch. The spacewalkers repressurized the airlock and removed their suits without issues. The US spacewalks were paused for 6 months until EVA-91 on January 16, 2025. The tasks planned for EVA-90 were rescheduled and partially completed during EVA-92 on January 30.
- June 27: Shortly after discovery of Resurs-P1 breakup, at 00:45 UTC the space station crew was instructed to shelter in their spacecraft as a precaution in the event of collision with the debris. About an hour later, "safe haven" was released, and crew returned to their normal operations.
- November 23: Several hours after hatch opening of Progress MS-29 cargo spacecraft, the space station crew reported an unexpected odor and droplets coming from the vehicle. The hatches between Poisk module, to which the spacecraft was docked, and the rest of the station was closed and air filtration systems were activated. The hatches were reopened on November 25, returning to normal operations. According to NASA, the odor originated from outgassing of materials inside the Progress, however RussianSpaceWeb later reported that the smell could have been caused by toxic hypergolic propellant that was stuck inside the docking mechanism because propellant lines weren't purged after departure of the previous spacecraft.

=== 2025 ===
- March: Cygnus NG-22 cargo resupply mission has been postponed indefinitely after the spacecraft's pressurized cargo module has been damaged during shipping. According to The Register, the container with the module was struck by heavy equipment, damaging both. Depending on extent of the damage, the element might be repaired and used on a future mission. The postponement lead to removal of some of the science equipment from the Cargo Dragon mission CRS-32 in favor of additional consumables and food.
- September 16: Early engine shutdowns during two of the orbit-raising burns of Cygnus NG-23 cargo spacecraft prevented the planned arrival to the station on September 17. After confirming the issue was caused by a conservative software safeguard, the spacecraft was cleared to proceed and was successfully captured by the robotic arm on September 18.

=== 2026 ===
- January 7: NASA postponed a spacewalk scheduled for Thursday 8 January due to a medical concern with a crew member that arose aboard the orbital complex. On January 8 the agency announced that the crew member was stable, however a potential risk of complications prompted the decision for return of Crew-11 at the earliest opportunity. The return took place on 15 January. The specifics of the condition and the affected crew member were not initially provided for medical privacy reasons, until the statement by Mike Fincke was published on 25 February saying he was the affected astronaut. In later interviews, he described the inciting event as sudden loss of speech for about 20 minutes.

== See also ==
- Maintenance of the International Space Station
