= MRM3 =

Protein-coding gene in the species Homo sapiens

Identifiers
- Aliases: MRM3, RNMTL1, HC90, RMTL1, mitochondrial rRNA methyltransferase 3
- External IDs: OMIM: 612600; MGI: 1914640; GeneCards: MRM3

Gene location (Human)
Chr.	Chromosome 17 (human)
Band	17p13.3	Start	782,353 bp
Band	17p13.3	End	792,509 bp

Gene location (Mouse)
Chr.	Chromosome 11 (mouse)
Band	11|11 B5	Start	76,134,541 bp
Band	11|11 B5	End	76,141,445 bp
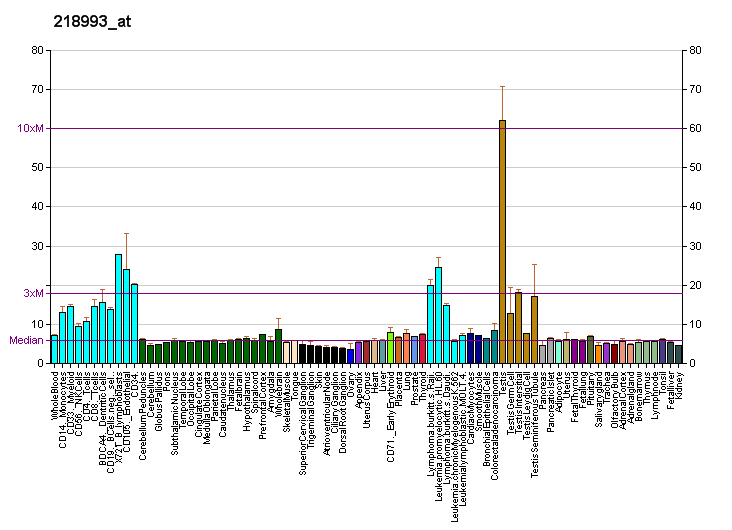
RNA expression pattern
Bgee	Human / Mouse (ortholog); Top expressed in: endothelial cell; gastrocnemius muscle; apex of heart; muscle of thigh; glutes; gingival epithelium; gonad; body of pancreas; sperm; deltoid muscle / Top expressed in: digastric muscle; interventricular septum; morula; sternocleidomastoid muscle; temporal muscle; right kidney; intercostal muscle; soleus muscle; muscle of thigh; epiblast; More reference expression data
BioGPS	More reference expression data
Gene ontology
Molecular function	RNA methyltransferase activity; transferase activity; protein binding; rRNA (guanosine-2'-O-)-methyltransferase activity; RNA binding; methyltransferase activity
Cellular component	mitochondrial matrix; mitochondrion
Biological process	rRNA processing; methylation; RNA processing; rRNA 2'-O-methylation
Sources:Amigo / QuickGO
Orthologs
Databases	NCBI: entry; OMA: entry
Species	Human	Mouse
Entrez	55178	67390
Ensembl	ENSG00000171861	ENSMUSG00000038046
UniProt	Q9HC36	Q5ND52
RefSeq (mRNA)	NM_018146; NM_001317947	NM_183263
RefSeq (protein)	NP_001304876; NP_060616	NP_899086
Location (UCSC)	Chr 17: 0.78 – 0.79 Mb	Chr 11: 76.13 – 76.14 Mb
PubMed search
- Wikidata
View/Edit Human	View/Edit Mouse

rRNA methyltransferase 3, mitochondrial is an enzyme that in humans is encoded by the MRM3 gene.

== See also ==
- Methyltransferase
  - RNA methyltransferase
- Mitochondrion
- MRM1, a gene encoing rRNA methyltransferase 1, mitochondrial
- MRM2
- Ribosomal RNA (rRNA)
