= MRM2 =

MRM2 may refer to:

- Poisk (ISS module), a docking module
- 21S rRNA (uridine2791-2'-O)-methyltransferase, an enzyme
