= MRM1 =

MRM1 may refer to:

- the MRM1 (gene)
- the Rassvet (ISS module)
