= Progress MS-29 =

2024 Russian resupply spaceflight to the ISS

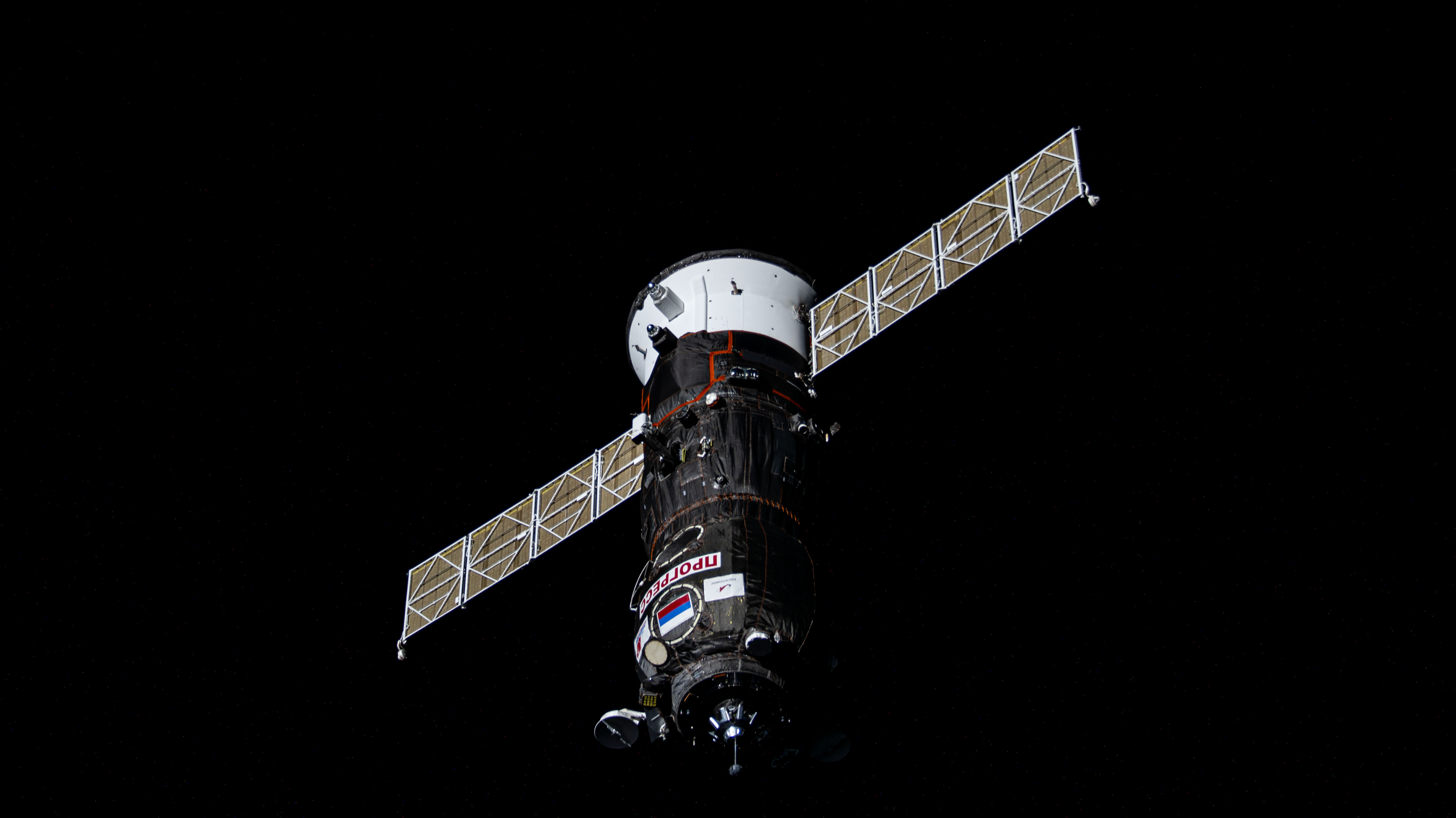
- Progress MS-29 approaches the ISS
- Names: Progress 90; ISS 90P
- Mission type: ISS resupply
- Operator: Roscosmos
- COSPAR ID: 2024-215A
- SATCAT no.: 62030
- Mission duration: 222 days, 10 hours and 7 minutes

Spacecraft properties
- Spacecraft: Progress MS-29 No. 459
- Spacecraft type: Progress MS
- Manufacturer: Energia
- Launch mass: 7,280 kg (16,050 lb)

Start of mission
- Launch date: 21 November 2024, 12:22:23 UTC (17:22:23 AQTT)
- Rocket: Soyuz-2.1a
- Launch site: Baikonur, Site 31/6
- Contractor: RKTs Progress

End of mission
- Disposal: Deorbited
- Decay date: 1 July 2025, 22:30 UTC

Orbital parameters
- Reference system: Geocentric orbit
- Regime: Low Earth orbit
- Inclination: 51.65°

Docking with ISS
- Docking port: Poisk zenith
- Docking date: 23 November 2024, 14:31 UTC
- Undocking date: 1 July 2025, 18:43 UTC
- Time docked: 220 days, 4 hours and 12 minutes

Cargo
- Mass: 2,487 kg (5,483 lb)
- Pressurised: 1,155 kg (2,546 lb)
- Fuel: 869 kg (1,916 lb)
- Gaseous: 43 kg (95 lb)
- Water: 420 kg (930 lb)

Progress MS-29 (Russian: Прогресс МC-29), Russian production No. 459, identified by NASA as Progress 90, was a Progress spaceflight launched by Roscosmos to resupply the International Space Station (ISS). It is the 182nd flight of a Progress spacecraft.

== Mission ==
Progress MS-29, launched on 21 November 2024 at 12:22:23 UTC (17:22:23 AQTT, local time at the launch site) from Site 31/6 at the Baikonur Cosmodrome in Kazakhstan atop a Soyuz-2.1a rocket. After a nominal two-day free flight, it docked with the zenith (space facing) port of the ISS's Poisk module on 23 November at 14:31:16 UTC.

Upon opening the hatch, the crew detected a toxic smell and possible contamination in the form of droplets. They immediately closed the hatch, and ISS systems were activated to scrub the atmosphere of potential contaminants. The hatch was reopened on 25 November and unloading of the cargo ship proceeded as planned. NASA said that outgassing from materials inside the pressurized cargo section was the likely source of the odor. However, some within the Russian space industry believe that the smell and droplets are likely related to the departure of the previous Progress MS-27 cargo ship on 19 November 2024. They believe that ground control failed to purge the lines to transfer propellant from the spacecraft to the station's tanks before undocking. As a result, highly toxic hypergolic propellants could have remained in the lines and spilled onto the docking mechanism as Progress MS-27 undocked. When Progress MS-29 arrived, the remaining propellant on the docking mechanism was trapped inside the hatch, allowing it to enter the station when it was opened.

== Manifest ==
Each Progress mission delivers over a thousand kilograms of supplies in its pressurized section, accessible to crewmembers. These supplies include consumables such as food, water, and air, along with equipment for maintenance and scientific research. In its unpressurized section, the spacecraft carries tanks of water, fuel, and gases to replenish the station’s resources and sustain its onboard atmosphere. These resources are transferred to the station through an automated process.

For this mission, Progress MS-29 was loaded with a total of 2,487 kg (5,483 lb) of cargo and supplies prior to launch. The cargo manifest includes the following:

- Pressurized supplies: 1,155 kg (2,546 lb)
- Fuel: 869 kg (1,916 lb)
- Water: 420 kg (930 lb)
- Nitrogen gas: 43 kg (95 lb)

== See also ==
- Uncrewed spaceflights to the International Space Station
- List of Progress missions
