= Progress M-MIM2 =

2009 Russian spaceflight to the ISS

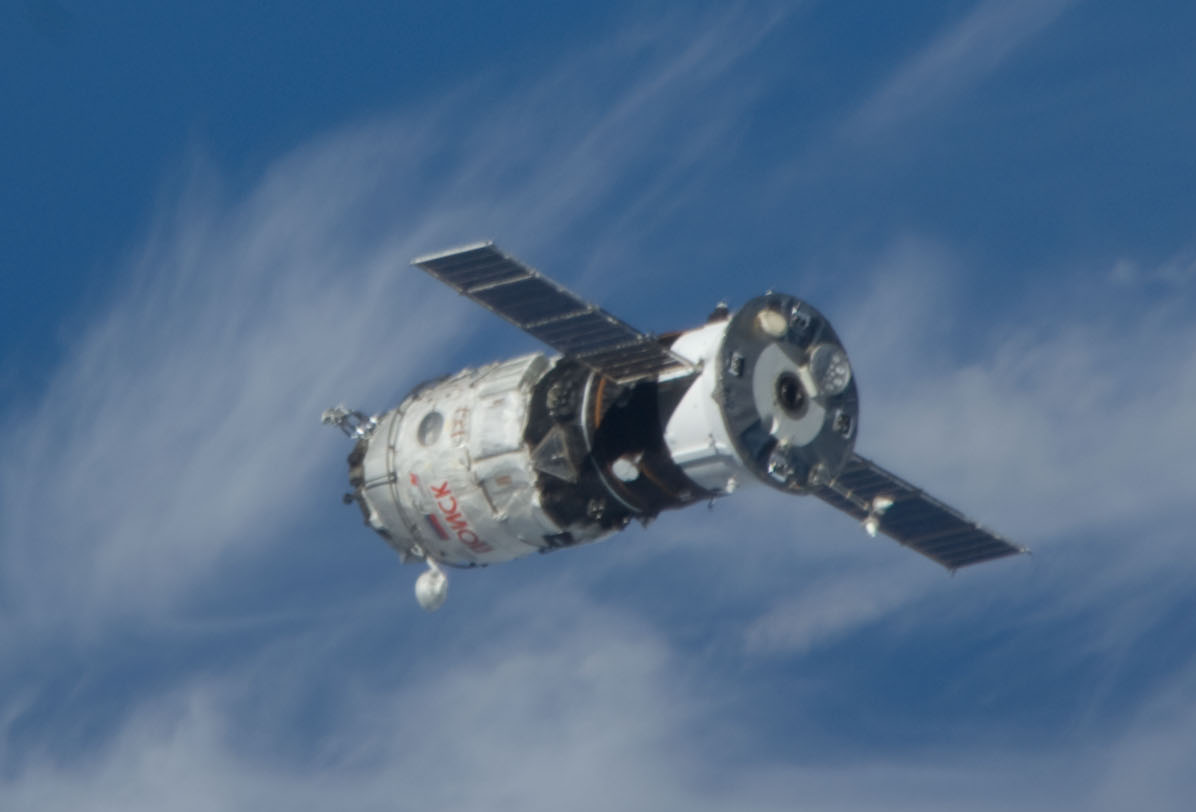
- Progress M-MIM2 and Poisk as seen by Expedition 21.
- Names: Прогресс М-МИМ2; Progress M-MRM2; Progress M-SO2
- Mission type: Poisk module delivery
- Operator: Roscosmos
- COSPAR ID: 2009-060A
- SATCAT no.: 36086
- Mission duration: 27 days and 15 hours

Spacecraft properties
- Spacecraft: Progress M No. 302
- Spacecraft type: Progress-M (modified)
- Manufacturer: Energia
- Launch mass: 7,150 kg (15,760 lb)
- Payload mass: 4,380 kg (9,660 lb)

Start of mission
- Launch date: 10 November 2009, 14:22:04 UTC
- Rocket: Soyuz-U
- Launch site: Baikonur, Site 1/5
- Contractor: RKT Progress

End of mission
- Disposal: Deorbited
- Decay date: 8 December 2009, 05:27 UTC

Orbital parameters
- Reference system: Geocentric orbit
- Regime: Low Earth orbit
- Perigee altitude: 336 km (209 mi)
- Apogee altitude: 344 km (214 mi)
- Inclination: 51.6°
- Period: 91.33 minutes
- Epoch: 18 November 2009

Docking with ISS
- Docking port: Zvezda nadir
- Docking date: 12 November 2009
- Undocking date: 8 December 2009
- Time docked: 25 days, 8 hours, 35 minutes (delivery craft)

Payload
- Poisk: 3,580 kg (7,890 lb); Cargo: 800 kg (1,800 lb)

Progress M-MIM2 (Russian: Прогресс М-МИМ2, alternatively transliterated as Progress M-MRM2 and originally designated Progress M-SO2) was a specially modified Progress M 11F615A55 spacecraft, Russian production No. 302, which was used to deliver the Poisk (MRM 2) module to the Russian Orbital Segment of the International Space Station. It was launched on 10 November 2009 at 14:22:04 UTC. The spacecraft consisted of a Progress M propulsion compartment, with the pressurized cargo section of the spacecraft removed to accommodate Poisk, similar to the Progress M-SO1 spacecraft which was used to deliver the Pirs module to the station in 2001. This was the 126th flight of a Progress spacecraft.

== Launch ==
Progress M-MIM2 and Poisk were launched by a Soyuz-U carrier rocket flying from Site 1/5 at the Baikonur Cosmodrome. The launch occurred at 14:22 GMT on 10 November 2009. At launch, Progress M-MIM2 had a total mass of 7,102 kilograms (15,657 lb), including the 3,670-kilogram (8,090 lb) Poisk module.

== Docking ==
The spacecraft docked with the zenith port of the International Space Station's Zvezda module on 12 November. Capture occurred at 15:41 GMT, and initial docking was completed successfully at 15:44.

== Undocking and Decay ==
At 00:16 GMT on 8 December, Progress M-MIM2 was undocked from Poisk, and at 04:48 GMT its engines ignited to begin a 38-second deorbit burn. It reentered the atmosphere over the Pacific Ocean at 05:27, and had broken up by 05:32.

== Photo gallery ==
The launch of Progress M-MIM2 and Poisk

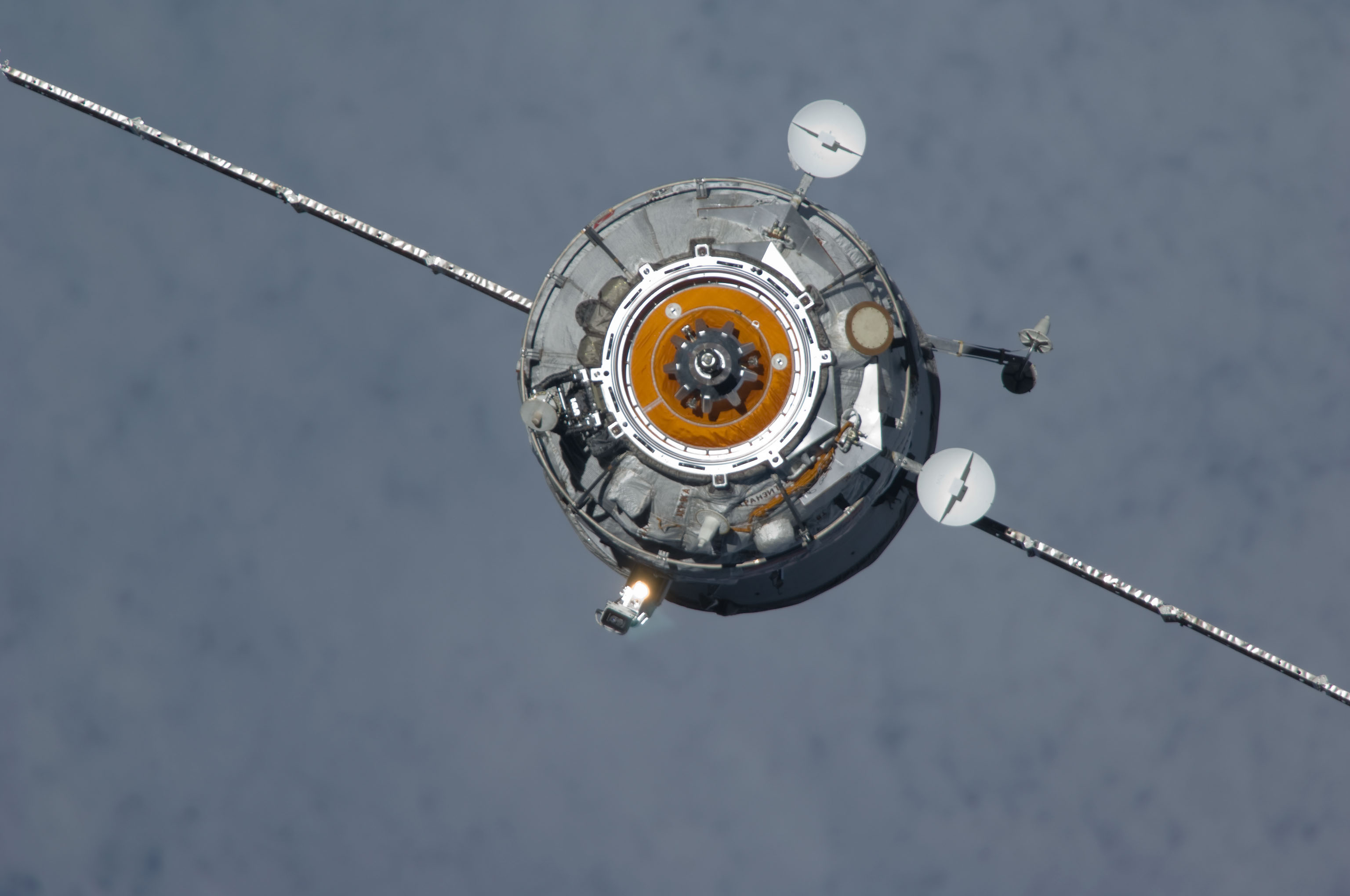
Progress M-MIM2 and Poisk approach ISS

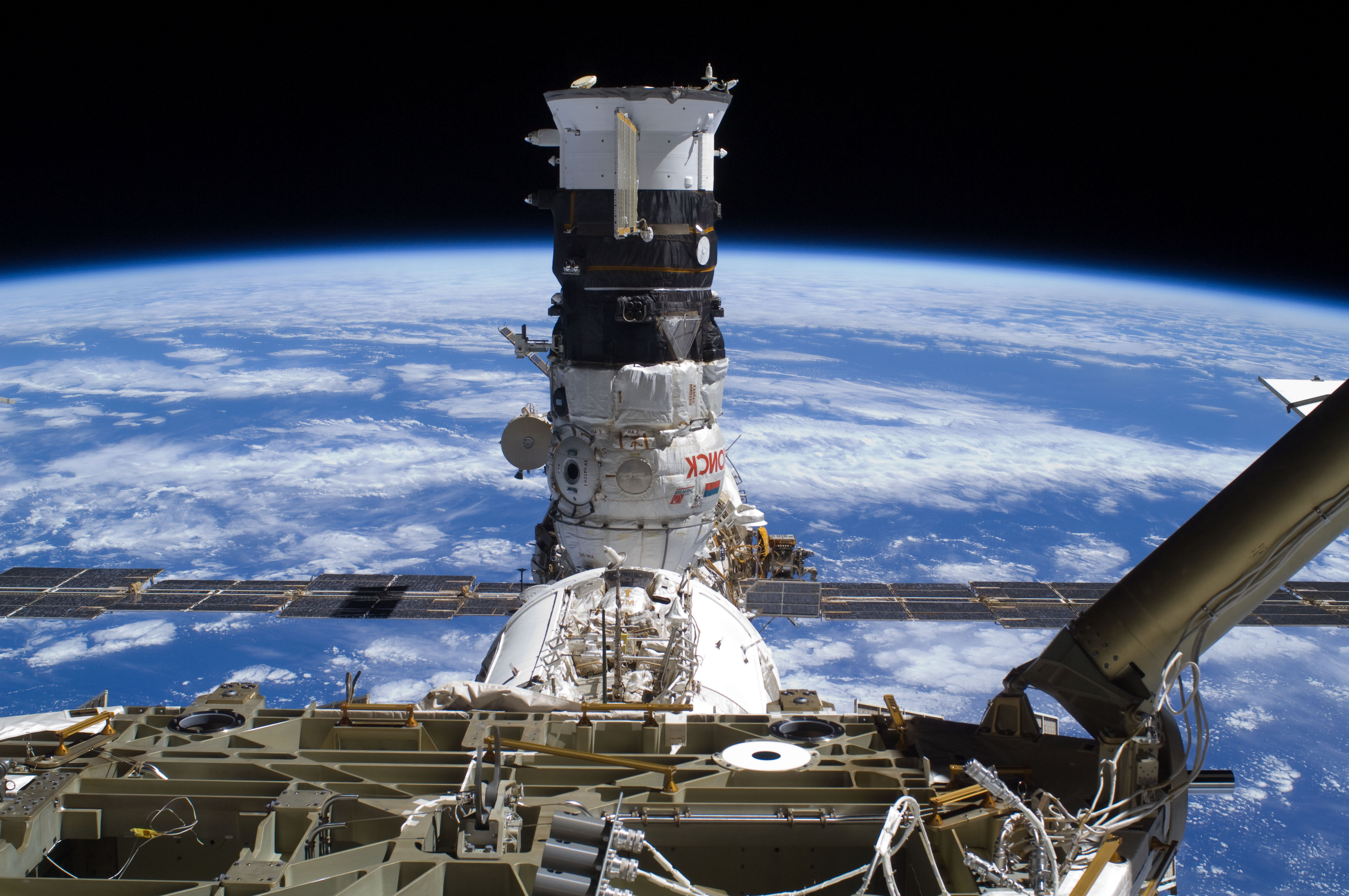
Progress M-MIM2 and Poisk docked with the ISS

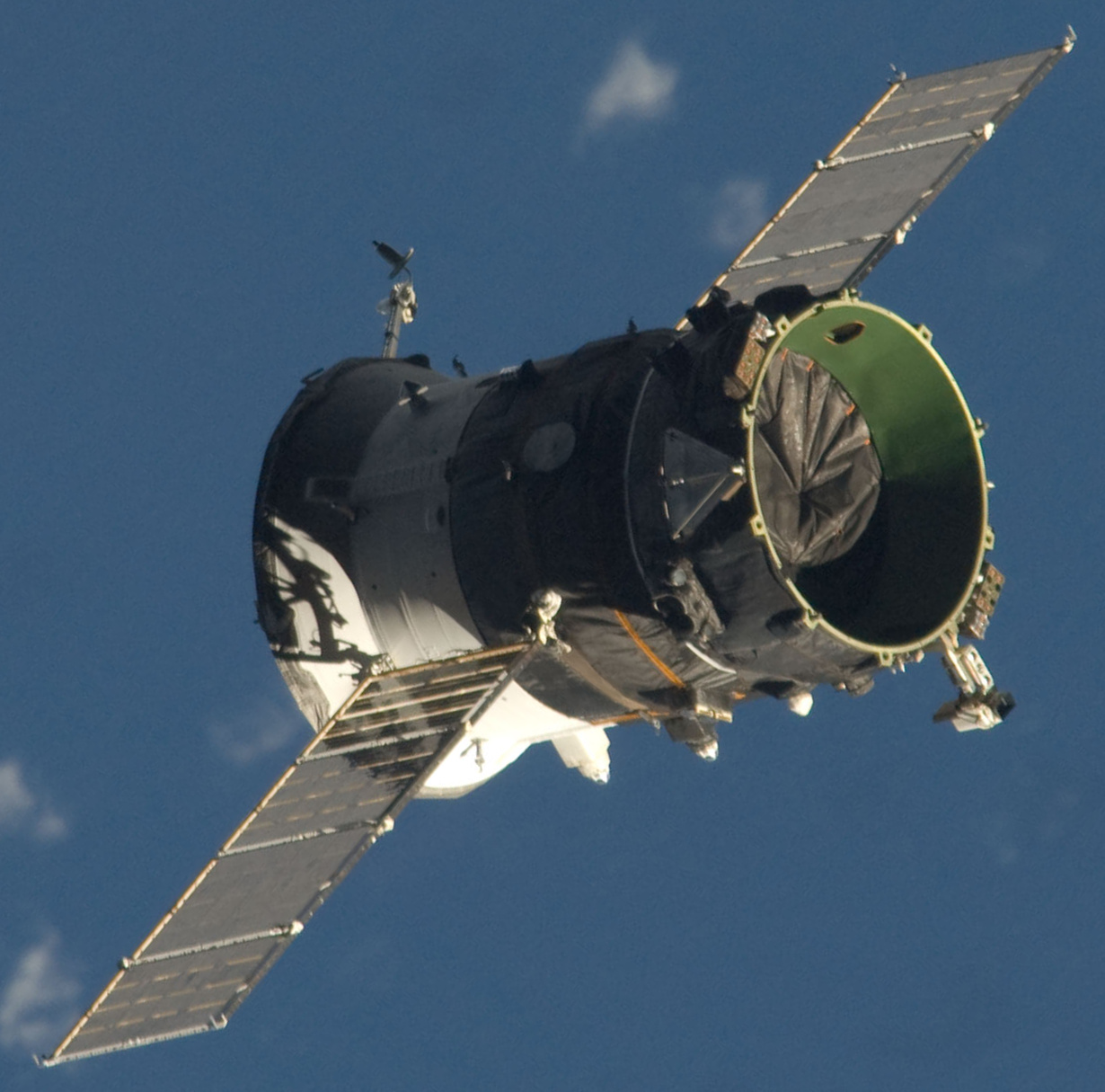
Progress M-MIM2 propulsion section departs

== See also ==
- List of Progress flights
- Uncrewed spaceflights to the International Space Station
- Progress M-UM
