= Progress MS-25 =

2023 Russian resupply spaceflight to the ISS

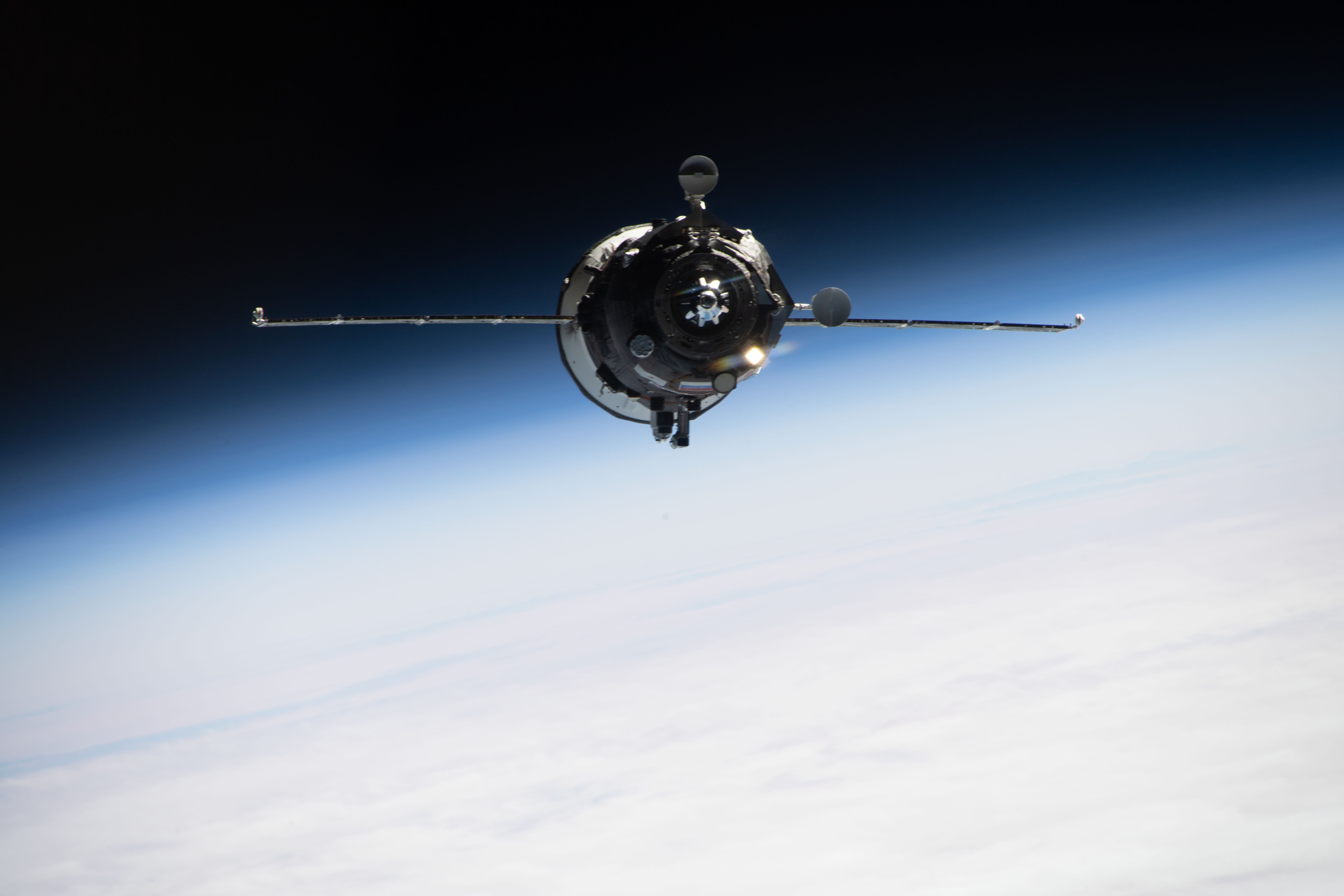
- Progress MS-25 during final approach to the ISS
- Names: Progress 86P
- Mission type: ISS resupply
- Operator: Roscosmos
- COSPAR ID: 2023-184A
- SATCAT no.: 58460
- Mission duration: 180 days, 2 hours and 23 minutes

Spacecraft properties
- Spacecraft: Progress MS-25 no.455
- Spacecraft type: Progress MS
- Manufacturer: Energia
- Launch mass: 7,000 kg (15,000 lb)
- Payload mass: 2,528 kg (5,573 lb)

Start of mission
- Launch date: 1 December 2023, 09:25 UTC
- Rocket: Soyuz-2.1a
- Launch site: Baikonur, Site 31/6
- Contractor: RKTs Progress

End of mission
- Disposal: Deorbited
- Decay date: 29 May 2024, 11:48 UTC

Orbital parameters
- Reference system: Geocentric orbit
- Regime: Low Earth orbit
- Inclination: 51.65°

Docking with ISS
- Docking port: Poisk zenith
- Docking date: 3 December 2023, 11:18 UTC
- Undocking date: 28 May 2024, 08:39 UTC
- Time docked: 176 days, 21 hours and 21 minutes

Cargo
- Mass: 2,528 kg (5,573 lb)
- Pressurised: 1,500 kg (3,300 lb)
- Fuel: 515 kg (1,135 lb)
- Gaseous: 40 kg (88 lb)
- Water: 420 kg (930 lb)

Progress MS-25 (Russian: Прогресс МC-25), Russian production No.455, identified by NASA as Progress 86P, was a Progress spaceflight launched by Roscosmos to resupply the International Space Station (ISS). It was the 178th flight of a Progress spacecraft.

== Launch ==
A Soyuz-2.1a launched Progress MS-25 to the International Space Station from Baikonur Site 31 on 1 December 2023. Around 2 days after the launch, Progress MS-25 was manually docked with Poisk and continued its mission.

== End of mission ==
Progress MS-25 undocked from Poisk on 28 May 2024 at 08:39 UTC and was deorbited for a destructive reentry on 29 May 2024 at 11:48 UTC.

== Cargo ==
The MS-25 cargo capacity is 2,528 kilograms (5,573 lb) as follows:

- Dry cargo: 1,500 kg (3,300 lb)
- Fuel: 515 kg (1,135 lb)
- Oxygen: 40 kg (88 lb)
- Water: 420 kg (930 lb)

== See also ==
- Uncrewed spaceflights to the International Space Station
