= Progress MS-35 =

Russian resupply spaceflight to the ISS

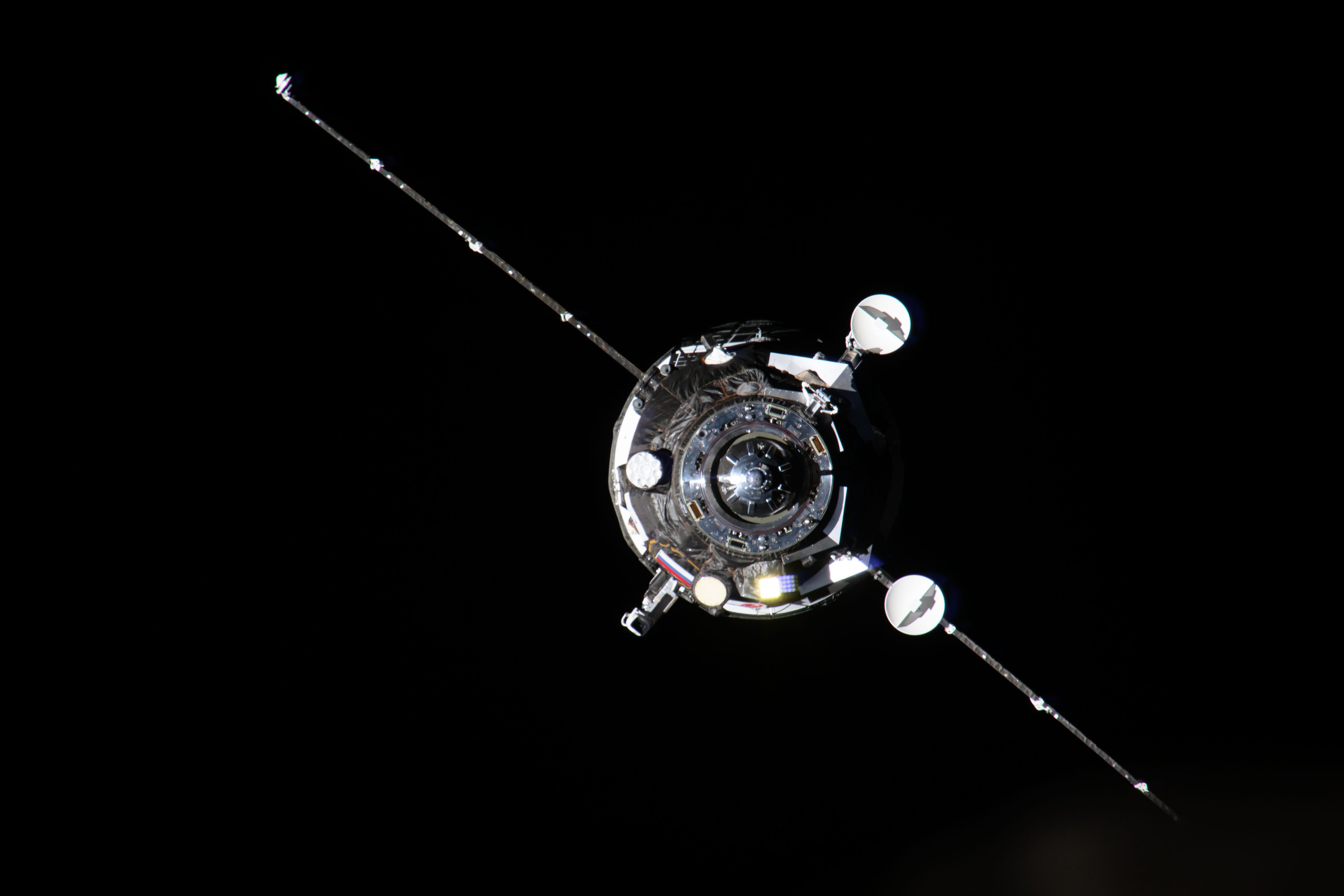
- Progress MS spacecraft on its final approach to dock to the ISS
- Names: Progress 96; ISS 96P
- Mission type: ISS resupply
- Operator: Roscosmos
- COSPAR ID: 2026-212A
- SATCAT no.: 100712
- Mission duration: 21 days, 6 hours and 7 minutes (in progress)

Spacecraft properties
- Spacecraft: Progress MS-35 No. 465
- Spacecraft type: Progress MS
- Manufacturer: Energia
- Launch mass: 7,280 kg (16,050 lb)

Start of mission
- Launch date: 16 September 2026, 13:33 UTC
- Rocket: Soyuz-2.1b
- Launch site: Baikonur, Site 31/6
- Contractor: RKTs Progress

End of mission
- Disposal: Deorbited (planned)
- Decay date: February 2027 (planned)

Orbital parameters
- Reference system: Geocentric orbit
- Regime: Low Earth orbit
- Inclination: 51.65°

Docking with ISS
- Docking port: Poisk zenith
- Docking date: 19 September 2026, 13:44 UTC
- Undocking date: February 2027 (planned)
- Time docked: 18 days, 5 hours and 56 minutes (in progress)

Progress MS-35 (Russian: Прогресс МC-35), Russian production No. 463, identified by NASA as Progress 96, is a Progress cargo spacecraft mission by Roscosmos to resupply the International Space Station (ISS) launched in September 2026.

== Cargo ==
Each Progress mission delivers pressurized and unpressurized cargo to the station. The pressurized section carries consumables such as food, along with equipment for maintenance and scientific research. The unpressurized section contains tanks of fuel, drinking water, and gases to replenish the onboard atmosphere, which are transferred to the station through automated systems. Progress MS-35 carried 2,600 kg of cargo.

== See also ==
- Uncrewed spaceflights to the International Space Station
- List of Progress missions
