= 21S rRNA (uridine2791-2'-O)-methyltransferase =

Class of enzymes

Identifiers
- EC no.: 2.1.1.168

Databases
- BRENDA: enzyme data
- ExPASy: NiceZyme view
- KEGG: enzyme entry
- MetaCyc: metabolic pathway
- Rhea: reactions
- PDB structures: RCSB PDB PDBe PDBsum
Search
- PMC: articles
- PubMed: articles
- NCBI: proteins

MRM2

Identifiers
- Aliases: MRM2, FJH1, HEL97, RRMJ2, FTSJ2, mitochondrial rRNA methyltransferase 2, MTDPS17
- External IDs: OMIM: 606906; MGI: 1915267; GeneCards: MRM2
Available structures
PDB	Ortholog search: PDBe RCSB
PDB	List of PDB id codes 2NYU

Gene location (Human)
Chr.	Chromosome 7 (human)
Band	7p22.3	Start	2,234,195 bp
Band	7p22.3	End	2,242,205 bp

Gene location (Mouse)
Chr.	Chromosome 5 (mouse)
Band	5|5 G2	Start	140,313,429 bp
Band	5|5 G2	End	140,317,653 bp
RNA expression pattern
Bgee	Human / Mouse (ortholog); Top expressed in: gonad; gastrocnemius muscle; granulocyte; placenta; lymph node; muscle of thigh; apex of heart; islet of Langerhans; testicle; right adrenal gland / Top expressed in: embryo; right kidney; proximal tubule; morula; blastocyst; embryo; primitive streak; yolk sac; muscle of thigh; epiblast; More reference expression data
BioGPS	n/a
Gene ontology
Molecular function	methyltransferase activity; transferase activity; rRNA (uridine-2'-O-)-methyltransferase activity
Cellular component	nucleolus; mitochondrial matrix; mitochondrion
Biological process	rRNA processing; methylation; cell population proliferation; RNA methylation; rRNA methylation; rRNA 2'-O-methylation
Sources:Amigo / QuickGO
Orthologs
Databases	NCBI: entry; OMA: entry
Species	Human	Mouse
Entrez	29960	68017
Ensembl	ENSG00000122687	ENSMUSG00000029557
UniProt	Q9UI43	Q9CPY0
RefSeq (mRNA)	NM_177442; NM_013393	NM_026510
RefSeq (protein)	NP_037525	NP_080786
Location (UCSC)	Chr 7: 2.23 – 2.24 Mb	Chr 5: 140.31 – 140.32 Mb
PubMed search
- Wikidata
View/Edit Human	View/Edit Mouse

21S rRNA (uridine^{2791}-2'-O)-methyltransferase (EC 2.1.1.168) is an enzyme with that in humans is encoded by the gene MRM2. Its systematic name is S-adenosyl-L-methionine:21S rRNA (uridine^{2791}-2'-O-)-methyltransferase. This enzyme catalyses the following chemical reaction

S-adenosyl-L-methionine + uridine^{279}1 in 21S rRNA $\rightleftharpoons$ S-adenosyl-L-homocysteine + 2'-O-methyluridine^{2791} in 21S rRNA

The enzyme catalyses the methylation of uridine^{2791} of mitochondrial 21S rRNA. Other names include mitochondrial 21S rRNA methyltransferase and mitochondrial rRNA MTase 2.
