= Poisk (ISS module) =

Docking compartment of the International Space Station

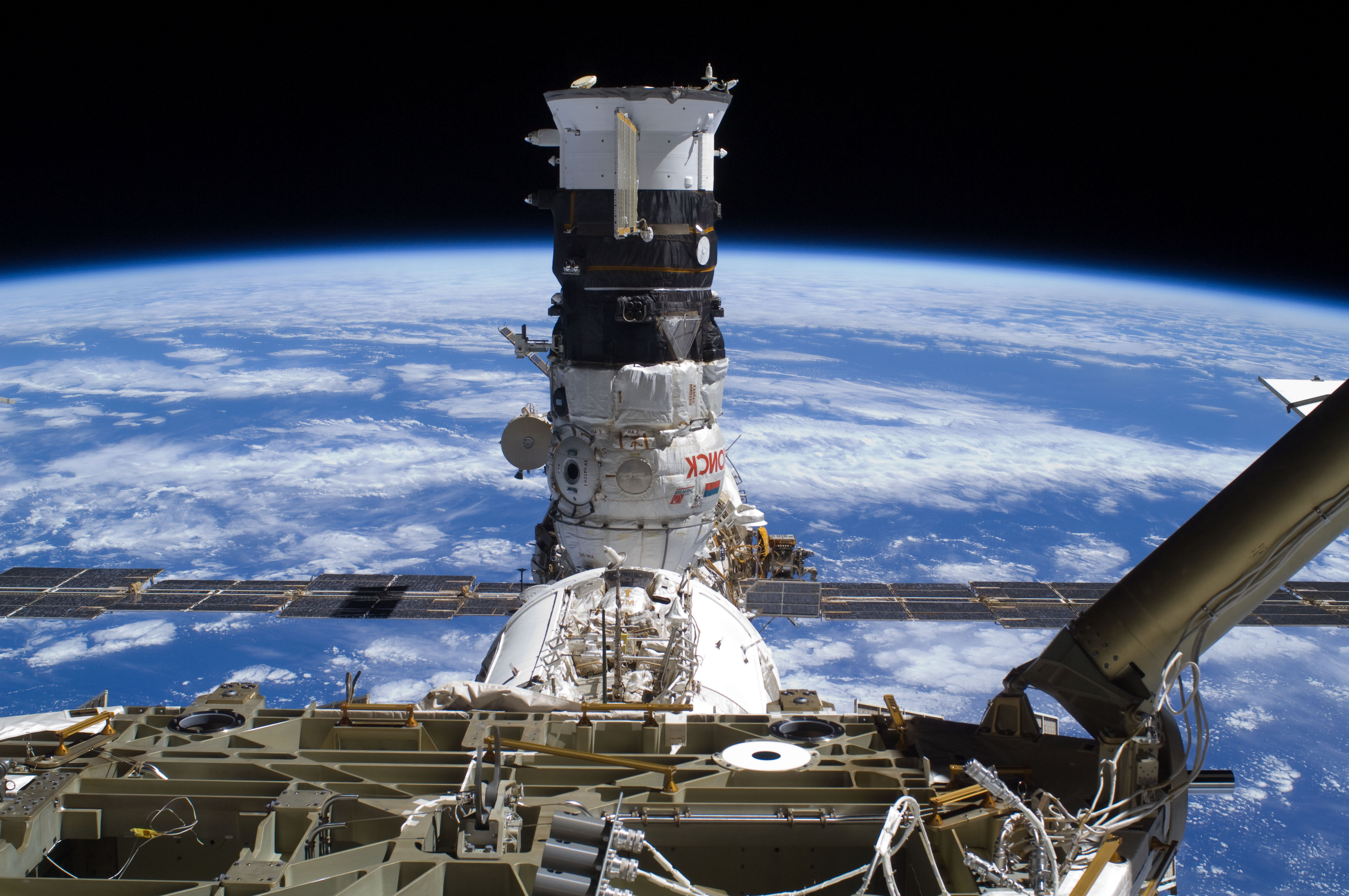
- Poisk attached to the ISS prior to the separation of its propulsion unit

Module statistics
- Part of: International Space Station
- Launch date: 10 November 2009, 02:22 UTC
- Launch vehicle: Soyuz-U / Progress No. 302
- Docked: 12 November 2009, 15:41 UTC (Zvezda zenith)
- Mass: 3,670 kg (8,090 lb)
- Length: 4.049 m (13.28 ft)
- Diameter: 2.55 m (8 ft 4 in)
- Pressurised volume: 14.8 m^{3} (520 cu ft)

Configuration
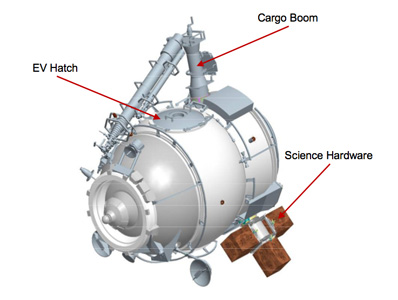
- Diagram of the Poisk module

Poisk (Russian: Поиск, lit. 'Search'), also known as the Mini-Research Module 2 (MRM 2, Russian: Малый исследовательский модуль 2), is a docking module of the International Space Station (ISS). Added in 2009, Poisk was the first major Russian addition to the International Space Station since 2001. Poisk is overall the same design as the docking module Pirs. Whereas Pirs was attached to the nadir ("bottom") port of Zvezda until it was replaced by Nauka, Poisk is attached to the zenith ("top"); Pirs was closer to the Earth with the ISS in its usual orientation, with Poisk on the other side. Poisk is Russian for explore or search. Poisk combines various docking, EVA, and science capabilities. It has two egress hatches for EVAs in addition to the two spacecraft docking ports. Although Poisk is designated as Mini-Research Module 2, it arrived before Mini-Research Module 1 (Rassvet), which had a different design; Poisk looks more like the Pirs docking port, which is not designated as a mini-research module.

== Details ==
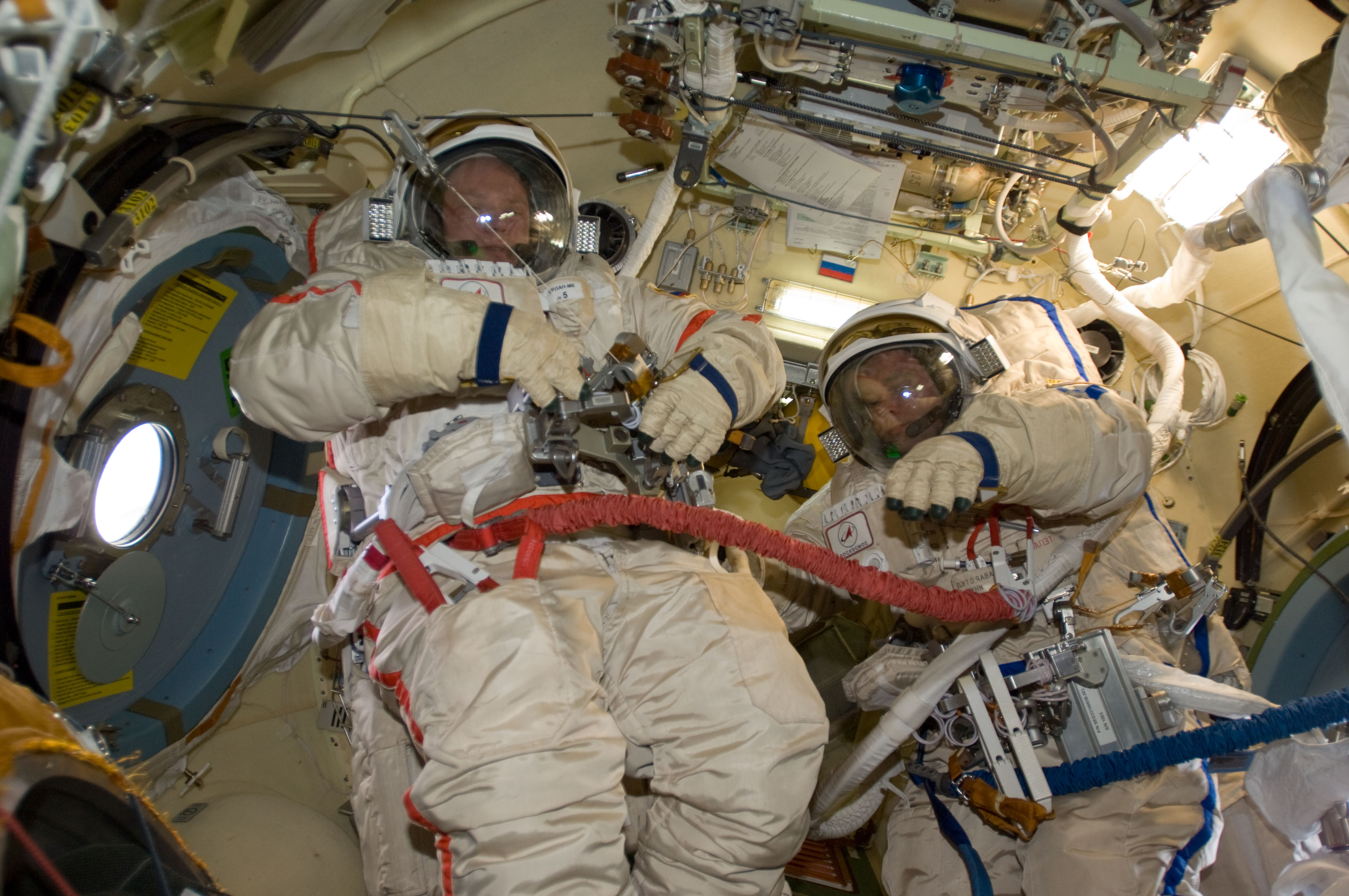
Interior of Poisk

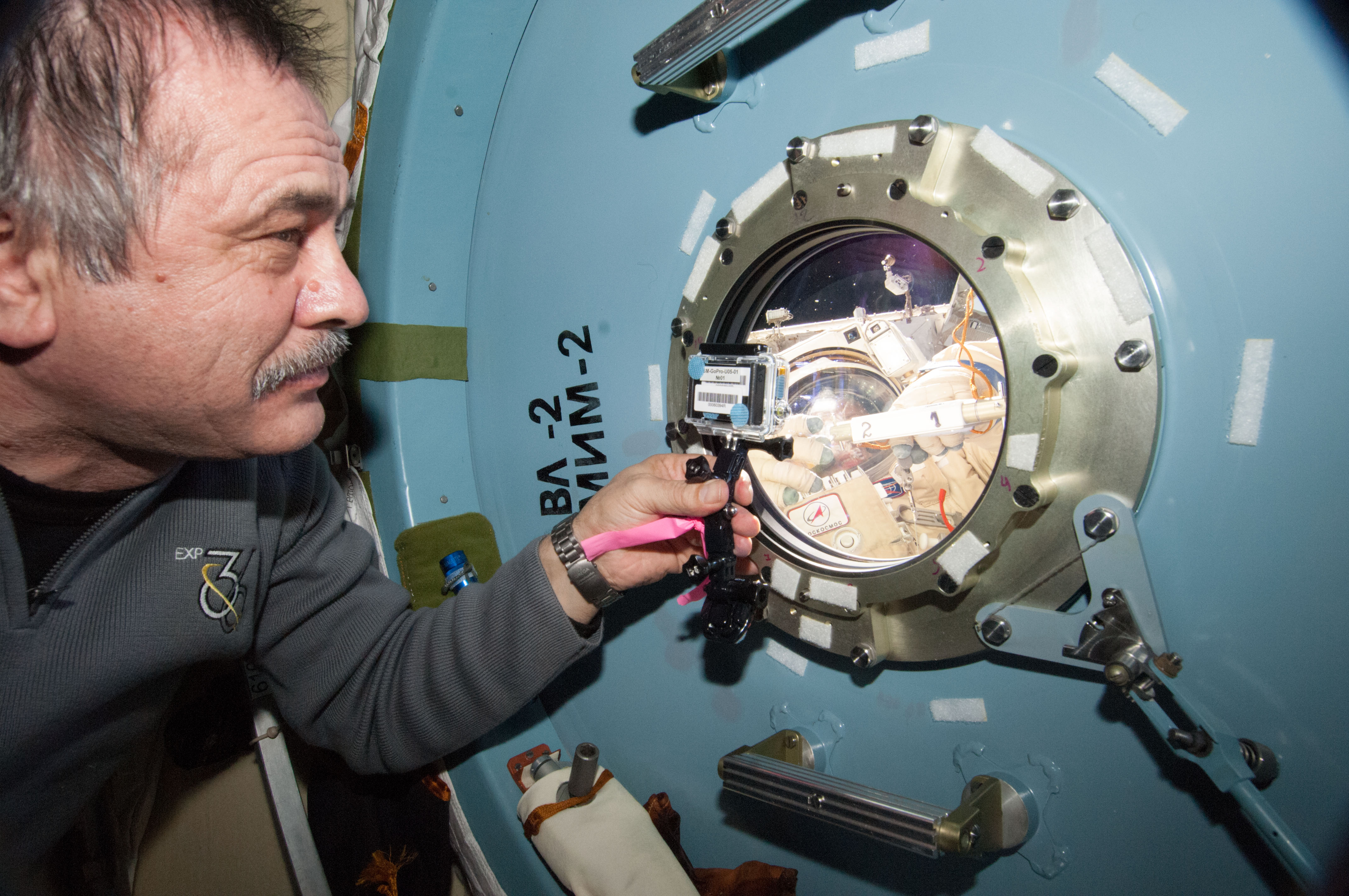
Pavel Vinogradov looks out of a Poisk window at Alexander Misurkin on EVA. MIM-2 in Russian can be seen written in black script on the inside of the hatch.

Poisk docked to the zenith port of the Zvezda module on 12 November 2009, and serves as a docking port for Soyuz and Progress spacecraft and as an airlock for spacewalks. Poisk will also provide extra space for scientific experiments, and provide power-supply outlets and data-transmission interfaces for two external scientific payloads to be developed by the Russian Academy of Sciences.

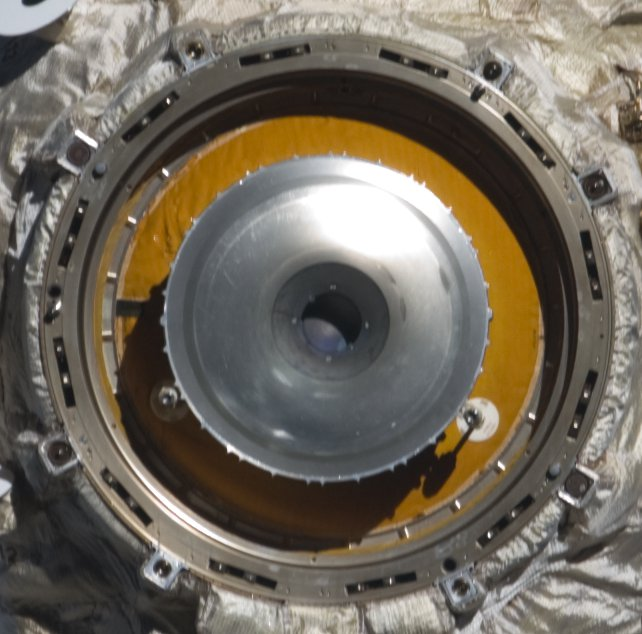
Zenith facing docking port on Zvezda, the docking location of the Poisk module

Two spacewalks conducted from the ISS in June 2009, successfully completed activities anticipating Poisk module's future berthing.

On 5 June 2009, during Russian Orlan EVA-22 spacewalk Expedition 19/20 Commander Gennady Padalka and Flight Engineer Michael Barratt installed two Kurs docking antennas, a docking target and electrical connectors on the exterior of Zvezda's Service Module.

On 10 June 2009, during Russian Orlan EVA-23 spacewalk Padalka and Barratt replaced a flat hatch cover in the forward section of Zvezda with a standard conical docking cone cover to allow for Poisk's docking.

On 14 January 2010, cosmonauts Oleg Kotov and Maksim Suraev conducted a spacewalk to outfit the Poisk module to prepare for receiving Soyuz and Progress ships in the future. They deployed antennas and a docking target, installed two handrails and plugged the new module's Kurs antennas into the Kurs docking system circuitry. The spacewalk lasted five hours and 44 minutes.

On 21 January 2010, the module was first used when cosmonaut Suraev and Expedition 22 commander Jeffrey Williams relocated their Soyuz TMA-16 spacecraft from the aft port of the Zvezda module to the zenith-facing port of the Poisk module. The Soyuz TMA-16 spacecraft undocked from the aft end of the Zvezda service module at 10:03 UTC and backed away to a distance of about 30m (100 feet) from the space station. Undocking occurred as the station flew about 343 km (213 miles) high off the southwest coast of Africa. Re-docking occurred at 10:24 UTC after Suraev fired the Soyuz maneuvering thrusters to fly halfway around the orbiting space station and line up with the Poisk module.

Since the EVA on 18 November 2020, Poisk has been used for EVAs instead of the decommissioned Pirs Docking Compartment.

== Design and construction ==
The module was designed and manufactured by S.P. Korolev RSC Energia, the organization engaged in the development and operational use of the ISS Russian segment.

== Launch ==
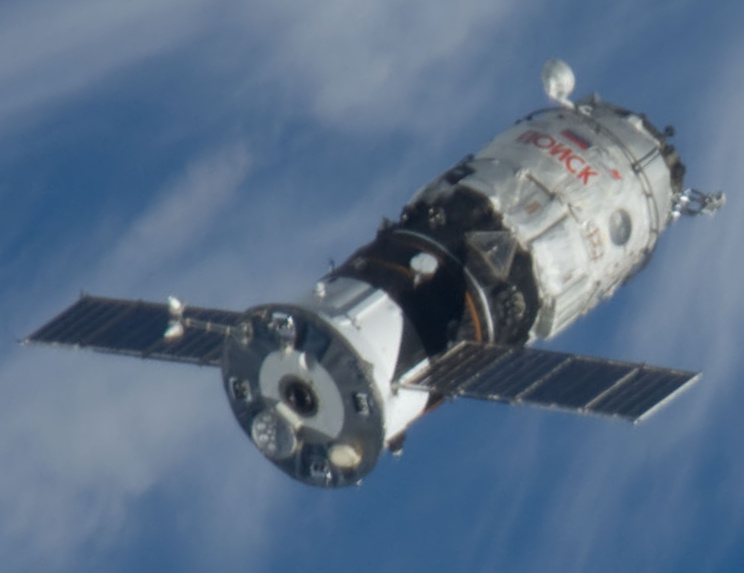
Poisk arriving at the ISS

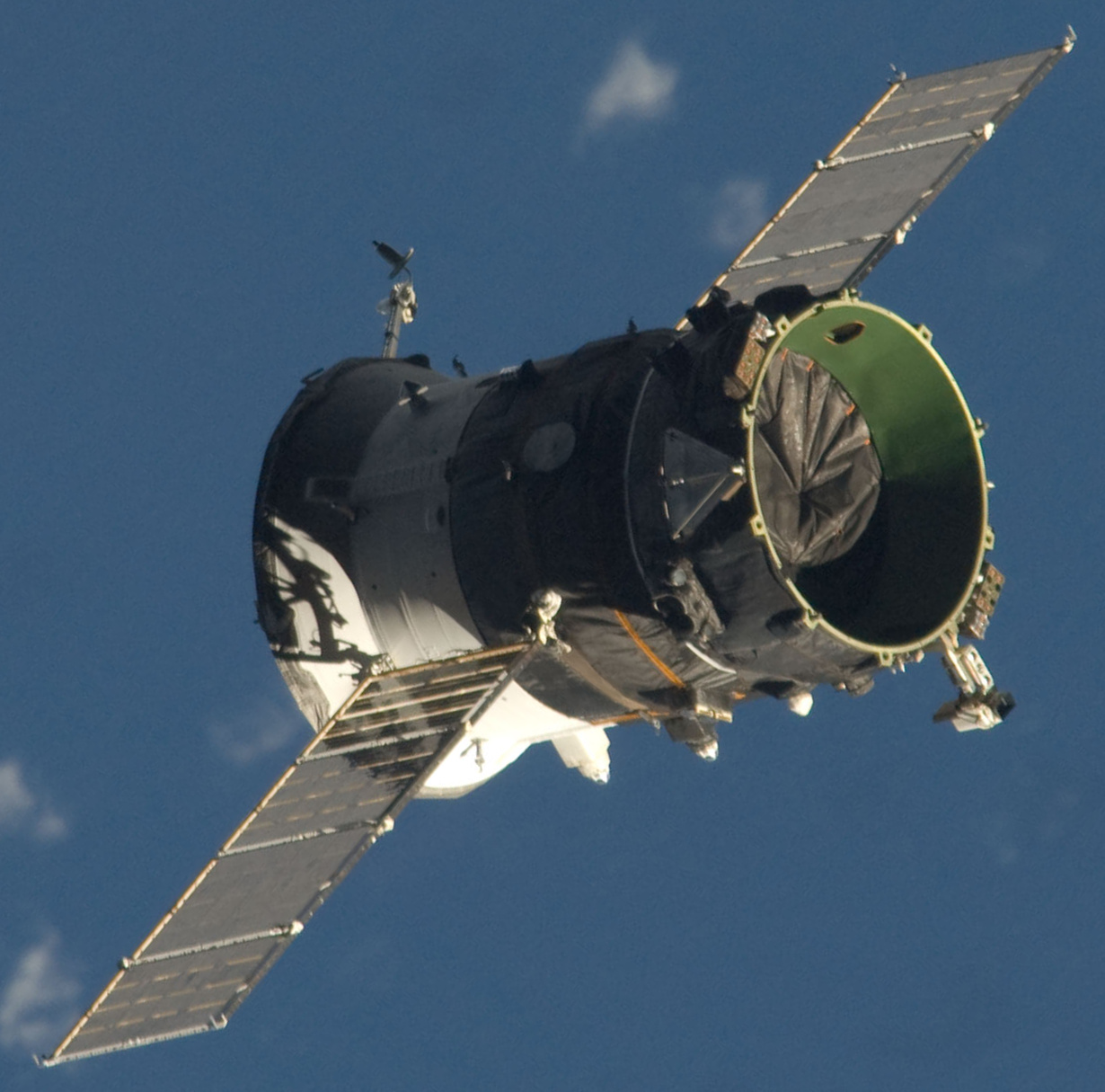
The propulsion compartment of the Poisk module departs

The module was launched on 10 November 2009, 2:22 p.m. GMT attached to a modified Progress spacecraft, called Progress M-MIM2, on a Soyuz-U rocket from Launch Pad 1 at the Baikonur Cosmodrome in Kazakhstan. The occasion also marked the 1750th launch of a Soyuz rocket in its various configurations. About eight minutes after launch, the three-stage Soyuz rocket delivered Poisk, to a low-altitude injection orbit. According to NASA Poisk carried about 816 kg (1,799 lb) of cargo to the ISS including new Russian Orlan spacesuits, life support equipment, medical supplies and crew hygiene items.

The Progress space tug provided electrical power and propulsion for the Poisk module during its two-day journey to the space station. On 12 November, Progress began its automated final approach to the station on a Kurs rendezvous radar system and at 15:41 UTC Poisk docked to the Zvezda module's zenith port. The docking happened as the space station sailed more than 354km (220 miles) over northern Kazakhstan.

Cosmonauts Maksim Suraev and Roman Romanenko entered the module for the first time by opening the hatch leading into Poisk at 12:17 UTC on 13 November 2009.

The jettisoning of the Progress ship from the Poisk module happened around 8 December 2009. The Progress was destroyed during re-entry into the atmosphere.

== Specifications ==
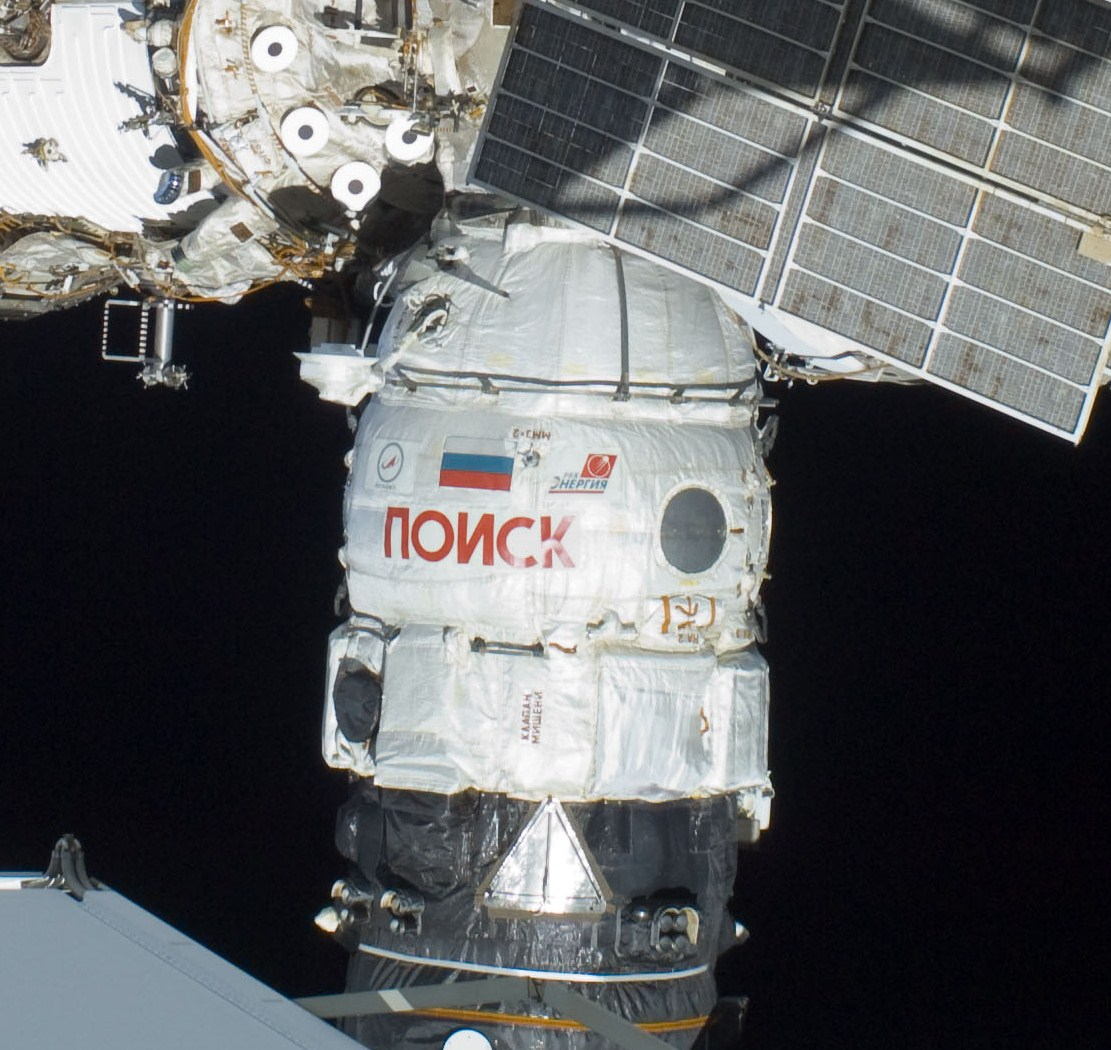
Poisk after arriving at the Space Station on 12 November 2009.

Designation	240GK No. 2L
Launch mass	3670 kg ± 50 kg
Maximum hull diameter	2.55 m
Hull length between docking assembly planes	4.049 m
Pressurized volume	14.8 m^{3}
Habitable volume	10.7 m^{3}
Number of egress hatches (open inward)	2
Egress hatch diameter	1 m
Mass of delivered cargoes	up to 1000 kg

== False depressurization alarm ==
False alarms woke the crews aboard space shuttle Atlantis and the Space Station at 01:36 UTC on 20 November 2009 and once again at 02:53 UTC on 21 November. An erroneous indication of a rapid depressurization led to the automatic shutdown of ventilation fans throughout the station, which stirred up dust and led to a false smoke detection alarm in the European Space Agency's Columbus laboratory. Mission control Capcom Frank Lien in Houston told the Expedition 21 Commander Frank De Winne that it might have originated from the Poisk module.

== Visiting spacecraft ==
All visiting spacecraft have launched from Baikonur Cosmodrome.

Spacecraft	Launch (UTC)	Launch vehicle	Launch pad	Docking	Undocking	Deorbit	Remarks
Progress M-MIM2	10 November 2009; 14:22:04	Soyuz-U	Site 1/5	—N/a	8 December 2009; 00:16	8 December 2009; 05:27	ISS-5R. Modified Progress-M spacecraft used as a tug to deliver Poisk to the ISS.
Soyuz TMA-16	30 September 2009; 07:14:45	Soyuz-FG	Site 1/5	21 January 2010; 10:24	18 March 2010; 08:03	18 March 2010; 11:24	ISS-20S. Had been docked to Zvedza since 2 October 2009 after delivering Expedition 21 crew.
Soyuz TMA-18	2 April 2010; 04:04	Soyuz-FG	Site 1/5	4 April 2010; 05:25	25 September 2010; 02:02	25 September 2010; 05:23	ISS-22S delivering Expedition 23 crew.
Soyuz TMA-01M	7 October 2010; 23:10:55	Soyuz-FG	Site 1/5	10 October 2010; 00:01	16 March 2011; 04:27	16 March 2011; 07:54	ISS-24S delivering Expedition 25 crew. Maiden flight of the Soyuz TMA-M capsule.
Soyuz TMA-21	4 April 2011; 22:18:20	Soyuz-FG	Site 1/5	6 April 2011; 23:09	16 September 2011; 00:38	16 September 2011; 03:59:39	ISS-26S delivering Expedition 27 crew.
Soyuz TMA-22	14 November 2011; 04:14:03	Soyuz-FG	Site 1/5	16 November 2011; 05:24	27 April 2012; 08:15	27 April 2012; 11:45	ISS-28S delivering Expedition 29 crew. Final flight of Soyuz-TMA capsule.
Soyuz TMA-04M	15 May 2012; 03:01:23	Soyuz-FG	Site 1/5	17 May 2012; 04:36	16 September 2012; 23:09	17 September 2012; 02:53	ISS-30S delivering Expedition 31 crew.
Soyuz TMA-06M	23 October 2012; 10:51:11	Soyuz-FG	Site 1/5	25 October 2012; 12:29	15 March 2013; 23:43	16 March 2013; 03:11	ISS-32S delivering Expedition 33 crew.
Soyuz TMA-08M	28 March 2013; 20:43:20	Soyuz-FG	Site 1/5	29 March 2013; 02:28	10 September 2013; 23:27	11 September 2013; 02:58	ISS-34S delivering Expedition 35 crew.
Soyuz TMA-10M	25 September 2013; 20:58:50	Soyuz-FG	Site 1/5	26 September 2013; 02:45	11 March 2014; 00:02	11 March 2014; 03:24	ISS-36S delivering Expedition 37 crew.
Soyuz TMA-12M	25 March 2014; 21:17:23	Soyuz-FG	Site 1/5	27 March 2014; 23:53	10 September 2014; 23:01	11 September 2014; 02:23	ISS-38S delivering Expedition 39 crew.
Soyuz TMA-14M	25 September 2014; 20:25:00	Soyuz-FG	Site 1/5	26 September 2014; 02:11	11 March 2015; 22:44	12 March 2015; 02:07	ISS-40S delivering Expedition 41 crew.
Soyuz TMA-16M	27 March 2015; 19:42:57	Soyuz-FG	Site 1/5	28 March 2015; 01:33	28 August 2015; 03:12	12 September 2015; 00:51	ISS-42S delivering Expedition 43 crew. Translated to Zvedza after undocking.
Soyuz TMA-18M	2 September 2015; 04:37:27	Soyuz-FG	Site 1/5	4 September 2015; 07:42	2 March 2016; 01:05	2 March 2016; 04:25:27	ISS-44S delivering Expedition 45 crew. Two visiting crew members returned on Soyuz TMA-16M. Returned with two crew launched on Soyuz TMA-16M that had performed a year-long mission on the ISS.
Soyuz TMA-20M	18 March 2016; 21:26:38	Soyuz-FG	Site 1/5	19 March 2016; 03:09	6 September 2016; 21:51:30	7 September 2016; 01:13	ISS-46S delivering Expedition 47 crew. Final flight of the Soyuz TMA-M capsule.
Soyuz MS-02	19 October 2016; 08:05:00	Soyuz-FG	Site 1/5	21 October 2016; 09:52	10 April 2017; 07:57	10 April 2017; 11:20	ISS-48S delivering Expedition 49 crew.
Soyuz MS-04	20 April 2017; 07:13:44	Soyuz-FG	Site 1/5	20 April 2017; 13:18	2 September 2017; 21:58	3 September 2017; 01:22	ISS-50S delivering Expedition 51 crew. Returned with one crew member launched on Soyuz MS-03 who had performed a 10 month mission on the ISS.
Soyuz MS-06	12 September 2017; 21:17:02	Soyuz-FG	Site 1/5	13 September 2017; 02:55	27 February 2018; 23:08	28 February 2018; 02:31	ISS-52S delivering Expedition 53 crew.
Soyuz MS-08	21 March 2018; 17:44	Soyuz-FG	Site 1/5	23 March 2018; 20:40	4 October 2018; 07:57	4 October 2018; 11:45	ISS-54S delivering Expedition 55 crew.
Soyuz MS-11	3 December 2018; 11:31	Soyuz-FG	Site 1/5	3 December 2018; 17:33	24 June 2019; 23:25	25 June 2019; 02:47:50	ISS-57S delivering Expedition 57 crew.
Soyuz MS-13	20 July 2019; 09:12:45	Soyuz-FG	Site 1/5	26 August 2019; 03:59	6 February 2020; 05:50	6 February 2020; 09:12:45	ISS-59S. Had been docked to Zvedza since 20 July 2019 after delivering Expedition 60 crew. Returned with one crew member launched on Soyuz MS-12 who had performed a 9 month mission on the ISS.
Soyuz MS-16	9 April 2020; 08:05:06	Soyuz-2.1a	Site 31/6	9 April 2020; 14:13:18	21 October 2020; 23:32:41	22 October 2020; 02:54:12	ISS-62S delivering Expedition 62 crew. First manned launch of a Soyuz-2 booster.
Soyuz MS-17	14 October 2020; 05:45:04	Soyuz-2.1a	Site 31/6	19 March 2021; 17:12:35	17 April 2021; 01:34:04	17 April 2021; 04:55:07	ISS-63S. Had been docked to Rassvet since 14 October 2020 after delivering Expedition 63 crew.
Progress MS-17	29 June 2021; 23:27:20	Soyuz-2.1a	Site 31/6	2 July 2021; 00:59	20 October 2021; 23:42	25 November 2021; 14:34	ISS-78P. Translated to Nauka after undocking.
Soyuz MS-20	8 December 2021; 07:38:15	Soyuz-2.1a	Site 31/6	8 December 2021; 16:40:44	20 December 2021; 23:50:30	20 December 2021; 03:12:52	ISS-66S performing a space tourism flight organized by Space Adventures.
Progress MS-19	15 February 2022; 04:25:40	Soyuz-2.1a	Site 31/6	17 February 2022; 07:03	23 October 2022; 22:45	24 October 2022; 01:51	ISS-80P
Progress MS-21	26 October 2022; 00:20:09	Soyuz-2.1a	Site 31/6	28 October 2022; 02:49:03	18 February 2023; 02:26	19 February 2023; 03:15	ISS-82P
Soyuz MS-23	24 February 2023; 00:24	Soyuz-2.1a	Site 31/6	26 February 2023; 00:58	6 April 2023; 08:45	27 September 2023; 11:17	ISS-69S. Capsule launched unmanned to serve as transport for crew of Soyuz MS-22 after that capsule suffered a micro-meteoroid impact which disabled its external radiators, rendering it potentially unable to return the crew safely. Translated to Prichal after undocking.
Progress MS-23	24 May 2023; 12:56	Soyuz-2.1a	Site 31/6	24 May 2023; 16:19	29 November 2023; 07:55	29 November 2023; 11:02	ISS-84P
Progress MS-25	1 December 2023; 09:25	Soyuz-2.1a	Site 31/6	3 December 2023; 11:18	28 May 2024; 08:39	29 May 2024; 11:48	ISS-86P
Progress MS-27	30 May 2024; 09:42:59	Soyuz-2.1a	Site 31/6	1 June 2024; 11:46:11	19 November 2024; 12:53	19 November 2024; 16:51	ISS-88P
Progress MS-29	21 November 2024; 12:22:23	Soyuz-2.1a	Site 31/6	23 November 2024; 14:31	1 July 2025; 18:43	1 July 2025; 22:30	ISS-90P
Progress MS-31	3 July 2025; 19:32:40	Soyuz-2.1a	Site 31/6	5 July 2025; 21:25	16 March 2026; 13:24	16 March 2026; 17:21	ISS-92P
Progress MS-33	22 March 2026; 11:59:51	Soyuz-2.1a	Site 31/6	24 March 2026; 13:40:47	7 September 2026; 15:18	7 September 2026; 18:27	ISS-94P
Progress MS-35	16 September 2026; 13:33	Soyuz-2.1a	Site 31/6	19 September 2026; 13:44	Planned for February 2027		ISS-96P

== Gallery (exterior) ==
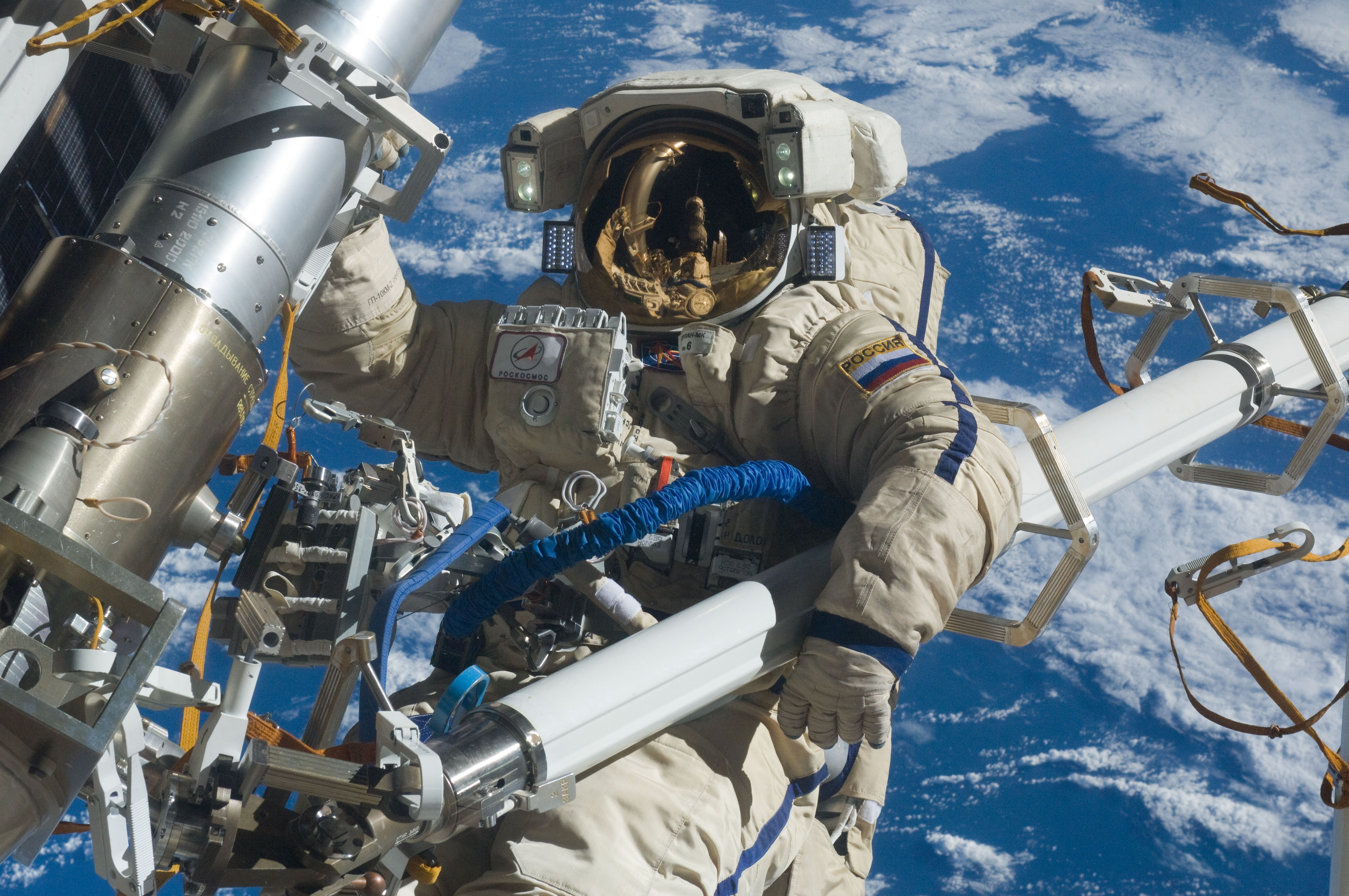
ISS crewmember attached to exterior of Poisk during an EVA

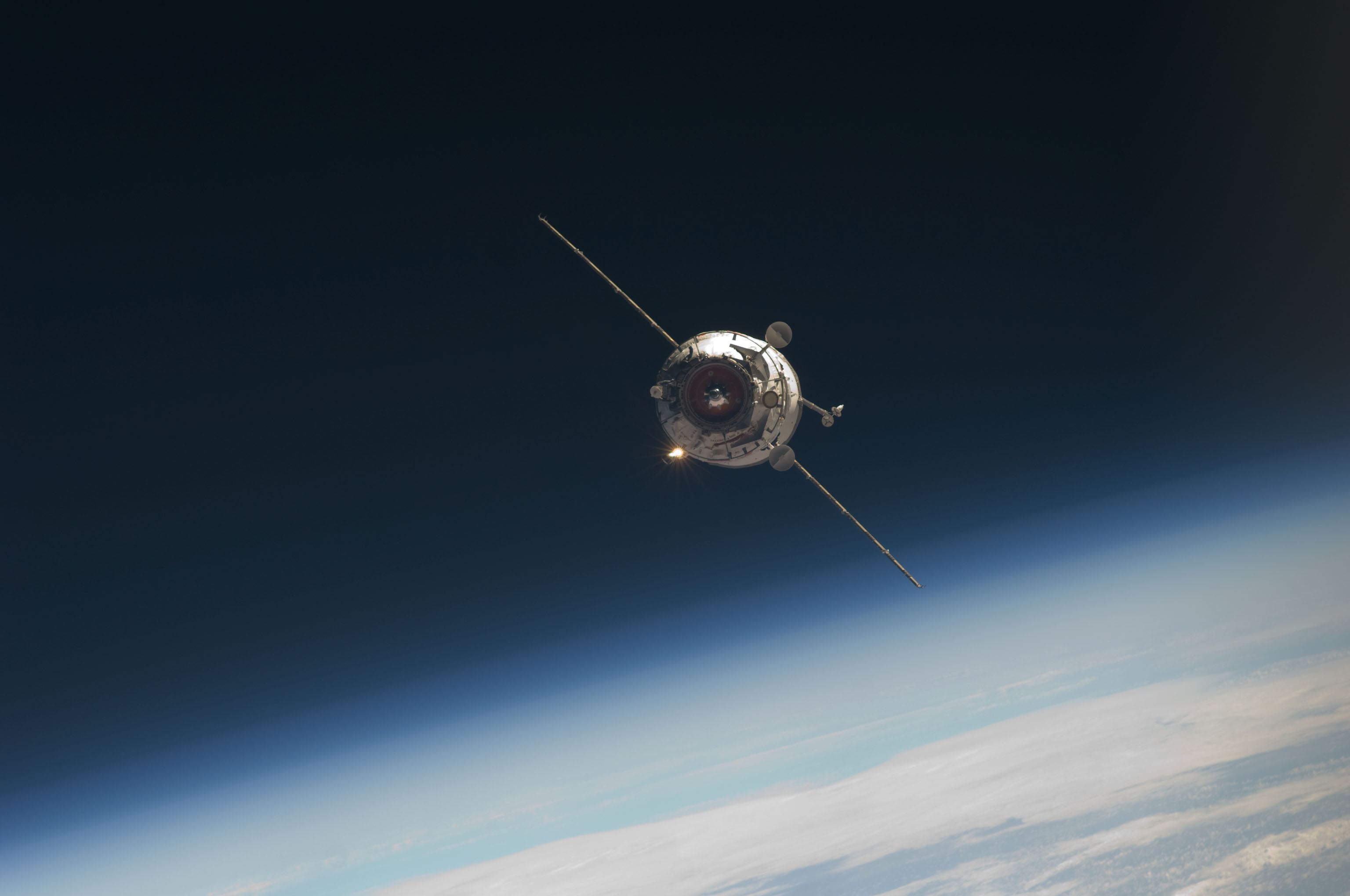
Poisk approaching the ISS for docking

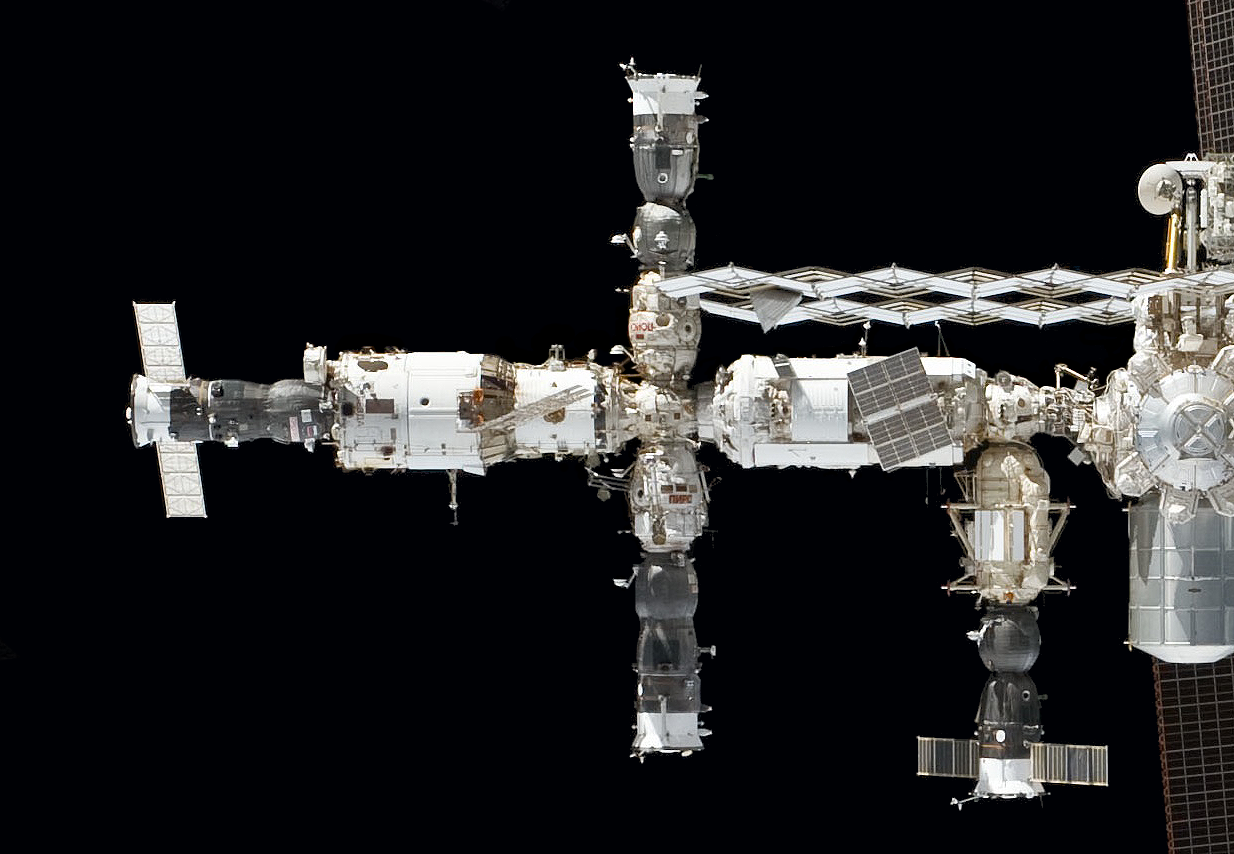
The Russian Orbital Segment - MRM-2 below upper Soyuz

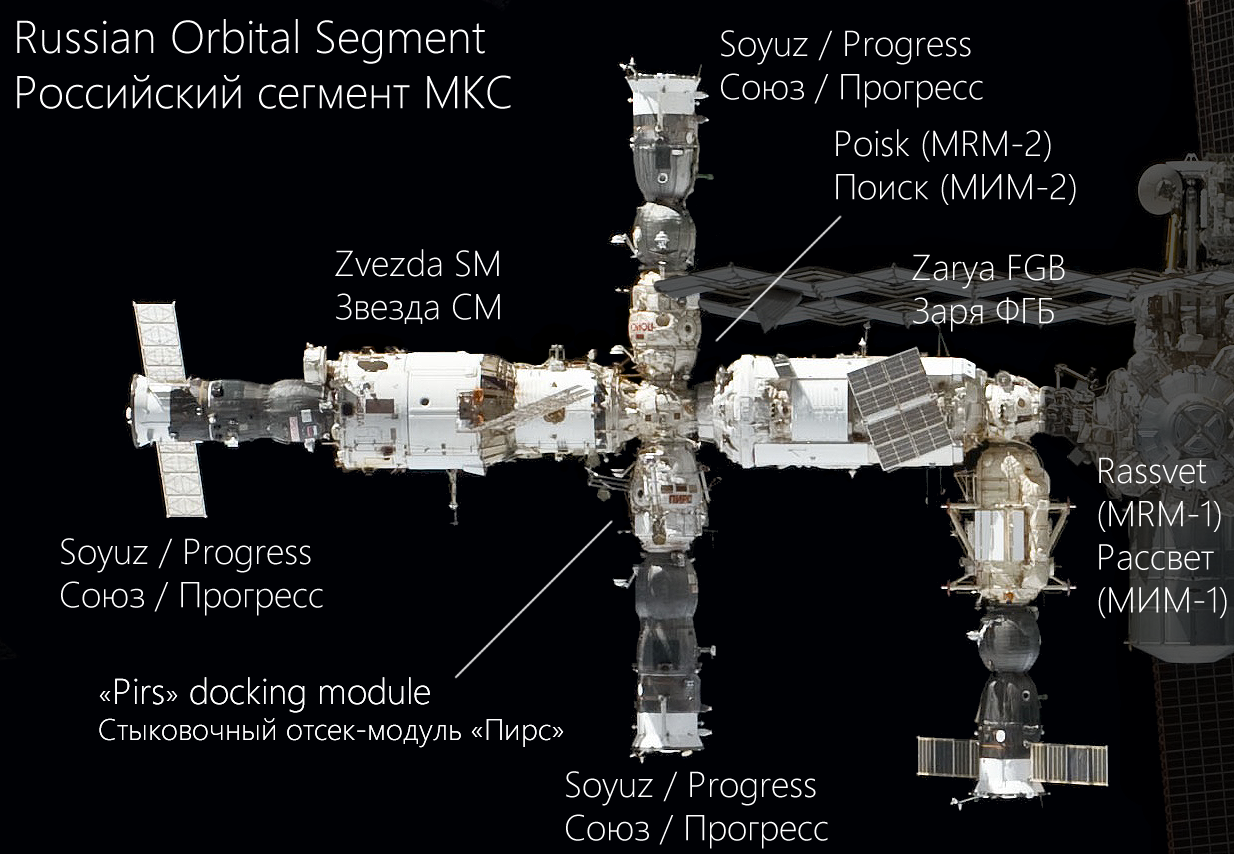
The location of MRM-2 and other modules on the Russian Orbital Segment

== Gallery (interior) ==
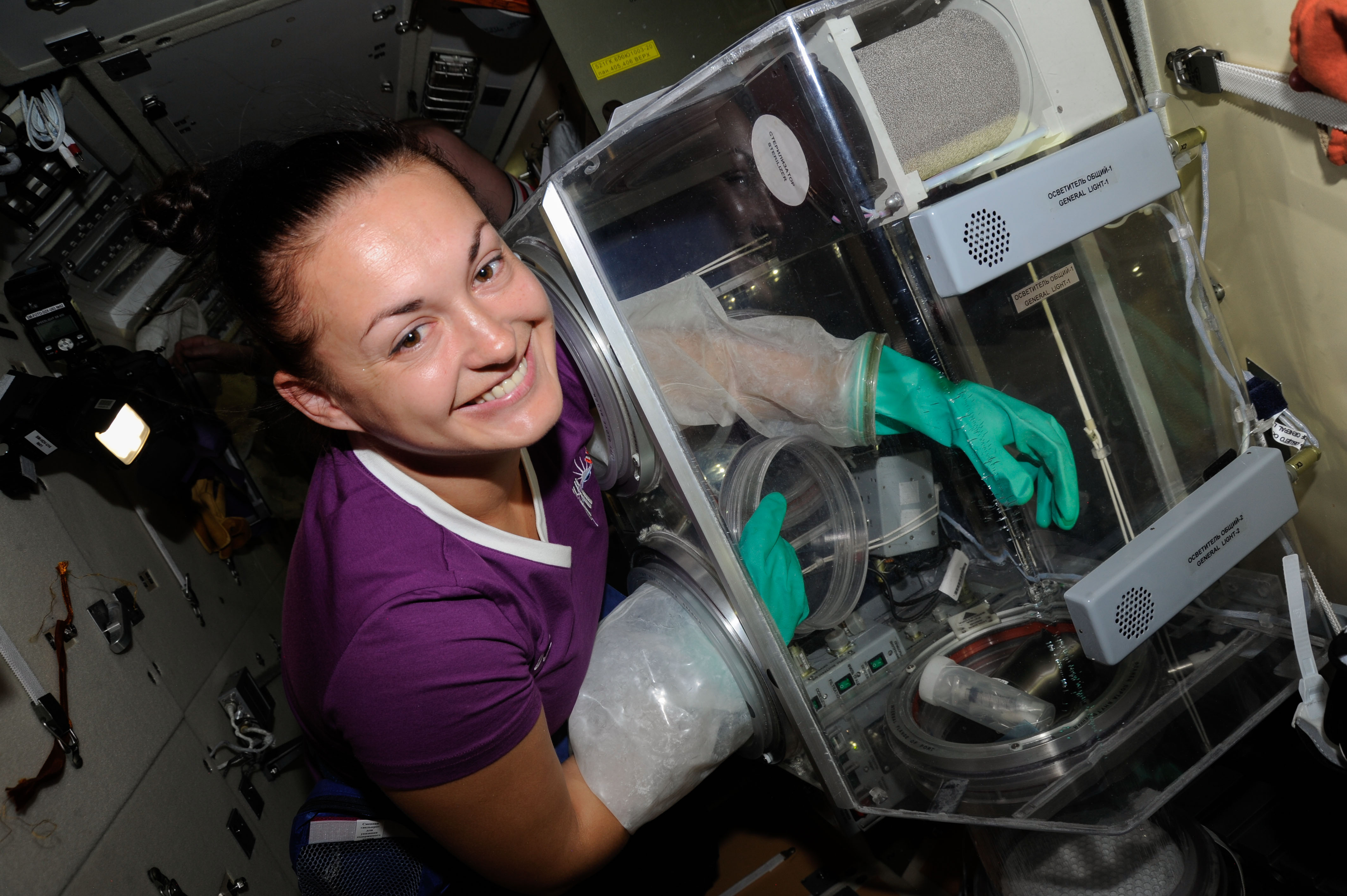
Yelena Serova works on an experiment in Poisk

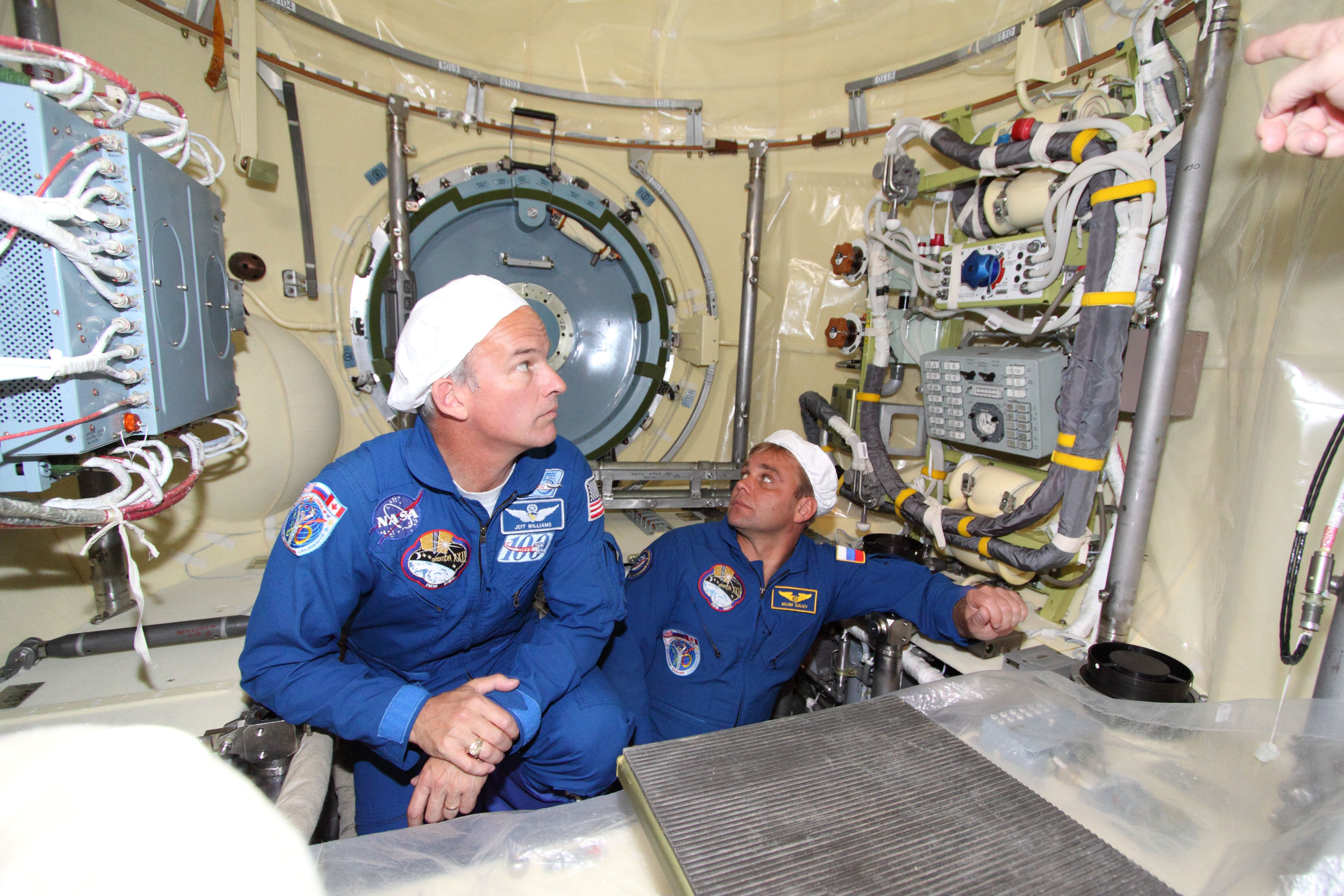
ISS crew inspect the new module's interior on Earth

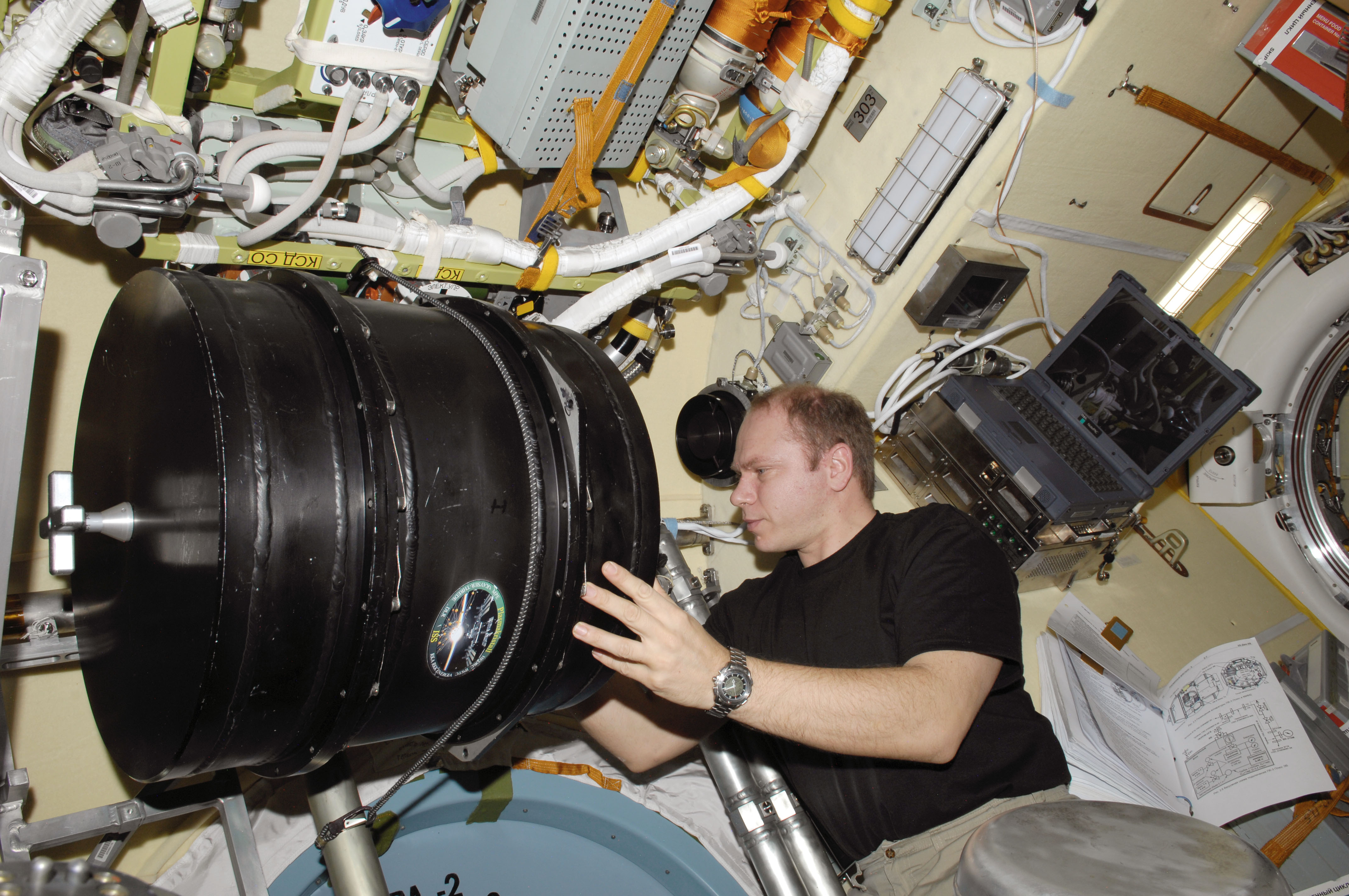
Plasma Crystal experiment 3 in Poisk

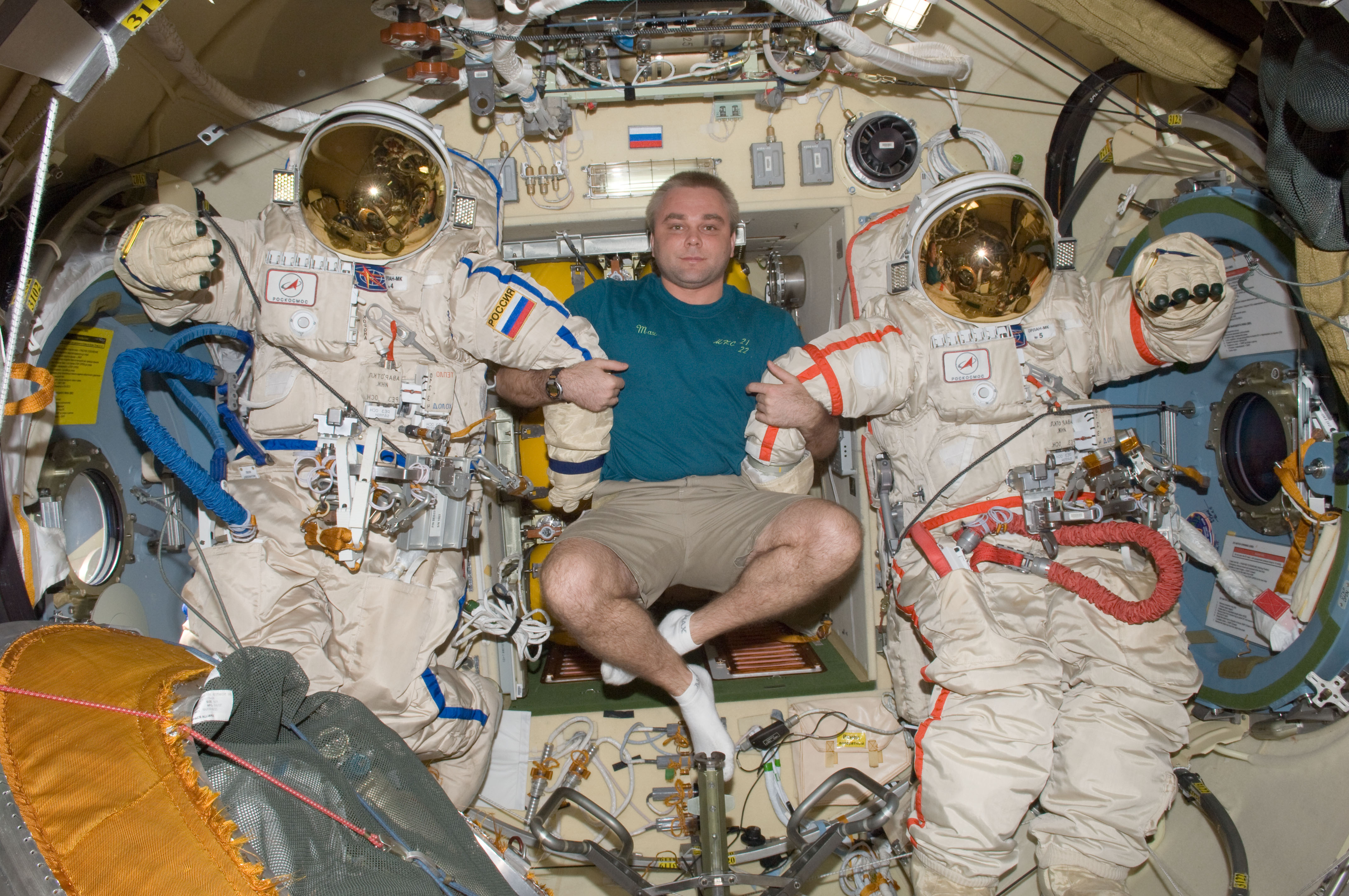
Maksim Surayev next to two Orlan-MK spacsuits in Poisk.

== Diagram ==
Labeled diagram of the Poisk ISS module

== See also ==
- Progress-M
- Rassvet (ISS module)
- Russian Orbital Segment
- Scientific research on the ISS
