= Progress MS-27 =

2024 Russian resupply spaceflight to the ISS

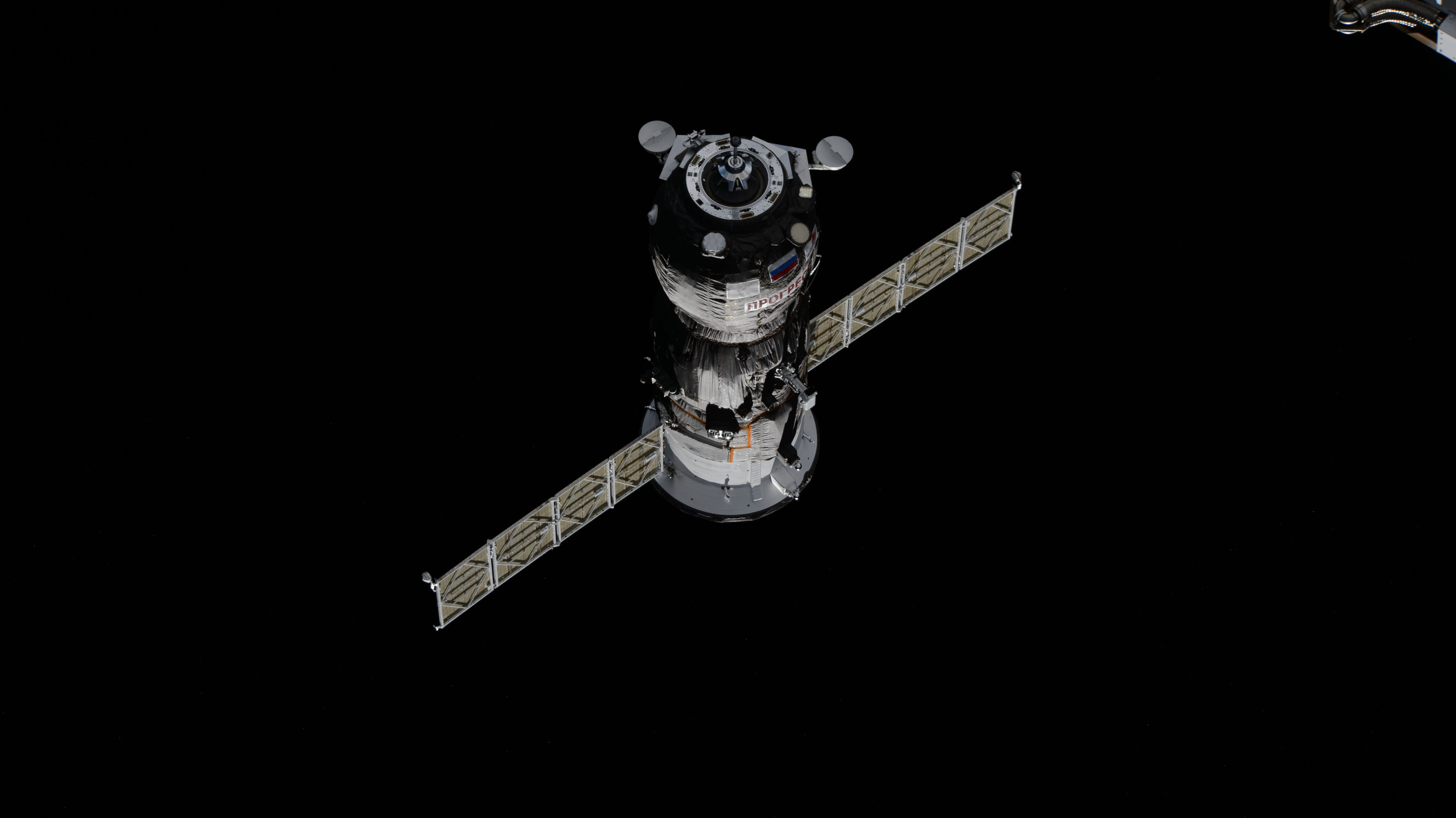
- Progress MS-27 approaches the ISS
- Names: Progress 88; ISS 88P
- Mission type: ISS resupply
- Operator: Roscosmos
- COSPAR ID: 2024-103A
- SATCAT no.: 59913
- Mission duration: 173 days, 7 hours and 8 minutes

Spacecraft properties
- Spacecraft: Progress MS-27 No. 457
- Spacecraft type: Progress MS
- Manufacturer: Energia
- Launch mass: 7,280 kg (16,050 lb)
- Payload mass: 2,504 kg (5,520 lb)

Start of mission
- Launch date: 30 May 2024, 09:42:59 UTC (14:42:59 AQTT)
- Rocket: Soyuz-2.1a
- Launch site: Baikonur, Site 31/6
- Contractor: RKTs Progress

End of mission
- Disposal: Deorbited
- Decay date: 19 November 2024, 16:51 UTC

Orbital parameters
- Reference system: Geocentric orbit
- Regime: Low Earth orbit
- Inclination: 51.65°

Docking with ISS
- Docking port: Poisk zenith
- Docking date: 1 June 2024, 11:46:11 UTC
- Undocking date: 19 November 2024, 12:53 UTC
- Time docked: 171 days, 1 hour and 6 minutes

Cargo
- Mass: 2,504 kg (5,520 lb)
- Pressurised: 1,290 kg (2,840 lb)
- Fuel: 754 kg (1,662 lb)
- Gaseous: 40 kg (88 lb)
- Water: 420 kg (930 lb)

Progress MS-27 (Russian: Прогресс МC-27), Russian production No. 457, identified by NASA as Progress 88, is a Progress spaceflight launched by Roscosmos to resupply the International Space Station (ISS). It is the 180th flight of a Progress spacecraft.

== Mission ==
The spacecraft, Progress MS-27 No. 457 arrived at the Baikonur Cosmodrome on 14 September 2023 after being shipped from Energia manufacturing facility in Russia by rail. The spacecraft underwent several months of pre-launch preparations including inspections, testing, fueling, and integration with the Soyuz-2.1a launch vehicle. After several schedule adjustments, the spacecraft was launched on 30 May 2024 at 09:42:59 UTC (14:42:59 AQTT, local time at the launch site). After a nominal two-day free flight, it docked with the zenith (space facing) port of the ISS's Poisk module on 1 June at 11:46:11 UTC.

After a nearly six-month stay at the ISS supporting Expedition 71, Progress MS-27 undocking on 19 November 2024, at 12:53 UTC, to make way for a new cargo vehicle. After a free flight of about three and a half hours, the spacecraft initiated a deorbit burn at 16:11 UTC. It reentered Earth's atmosphere and disintegrated over the Pacific Ocean, with debris projected to impact the ocean at 16:51 UTC.

== Manifest ==
Each Progress mission delivers over a thousand kilograms of supplies in its pressurized section, accessible to crewmembers. These supplies include consumables such as food, water, and air, along with equipment for maintenance and scientific research. In its unpressurized section, the spacecraft carries tanks of water, fuel, and gases to replenish the station’s resources and sustain its onboard atmosphere. These resources are transferred to the station through an automated process.

For this mission, Progress MS-27 was loaded with a total of 2,504 kg (5,520 lb) of cargo and supplies prior to launch. The cargo manifest includes the following:

- Pressurized supplies: 1,290 kg (2,840 lb)
- Fuel: 754 kg (1,662 lb)
- Water: 420 kg (930 lb)
- Nitrogen gas: 40 kg (88 lb)

== See also ==
- Uncrewed spaceflights to the International Space Station
