= MRM1 (gene) =

Protein-coding gene in the species Homo sapiens

Identifiers
- Aliases: MRM1, mitochondrial rRNA methyltransferase 1
- External IDs: OMIM: 618099; MGI: 2443470; GeneCards: MRM1

Gene location (Human)
Chr.	Chromosome 17 (human)
Band	17q12	Start	36,601,583 bp
Band	17q12	End	36,608,964 bp

Gene location (Mouse)
Chr.	Chromosome 11 (mouse)
Band	11|11 C	Start	84,703,887 bp
Band	11|11 C	End	84,710,341 bp
RNA expression pattern
Bgee	Human / Mouse (ortholog); Top expressed in: gonad; mucosa of transverse colon; apex of heart; gastrocnemius muscle; granulocyte; left ventricle; right adrenal gland; left adrenal gland; right lobe of liver; right adrenal cortex / Top expressed in: interventricular septum; extraocular muscle; yolk sac; right ventricle; myocardium of ventricle; cumulus cell; aortic valve; fetal liver hematopoietic progenitor cell; granulocyte; soleus muscle; More reference expression data
BioGPS	n/a
Gene ontology
Molecular function	methyltransferase activity; RNA methyltransferase activity; transferase activity; protein binding; rRNA (guanosine-2'-O-)-methyltransferase activity; RNA binding
Cellular component	mitochondrion; mitochondrial matrix
Biological process	rRNA processing; methylation; RNA processing; enzyme-directed rRNA 2'-O-methylation; rRNA 2'-O-methylation
Sources:Amigo / QuickGO
Orthologs
Databases	NCBI: entry; OMA: entry
Species	Human	Mouse
Entrez	79922	217038
Ensembl	ENSG00000274853; ENSG00000278619	ENSMUSG00000018405
UniProt	Q6IN84	Q99J25
RefSeq (mRNA)	NM_024864	NM_145433
RefSeq (protein)	NP_079140	NP_663408
Location (UCSC)	Chr 17: 36.6 – 36.61 Mb	Chr 11: 84.7 – 84.71 Mb
PubMed search
- Wikidata
View/Edit Human	View/Edit Mouse

Mitochondrial rRNA methyltransferase 1 is a protein that in humans is encoded by the MRM1 gene.
