= Progress M-55 =

Russian cargo spacecraft

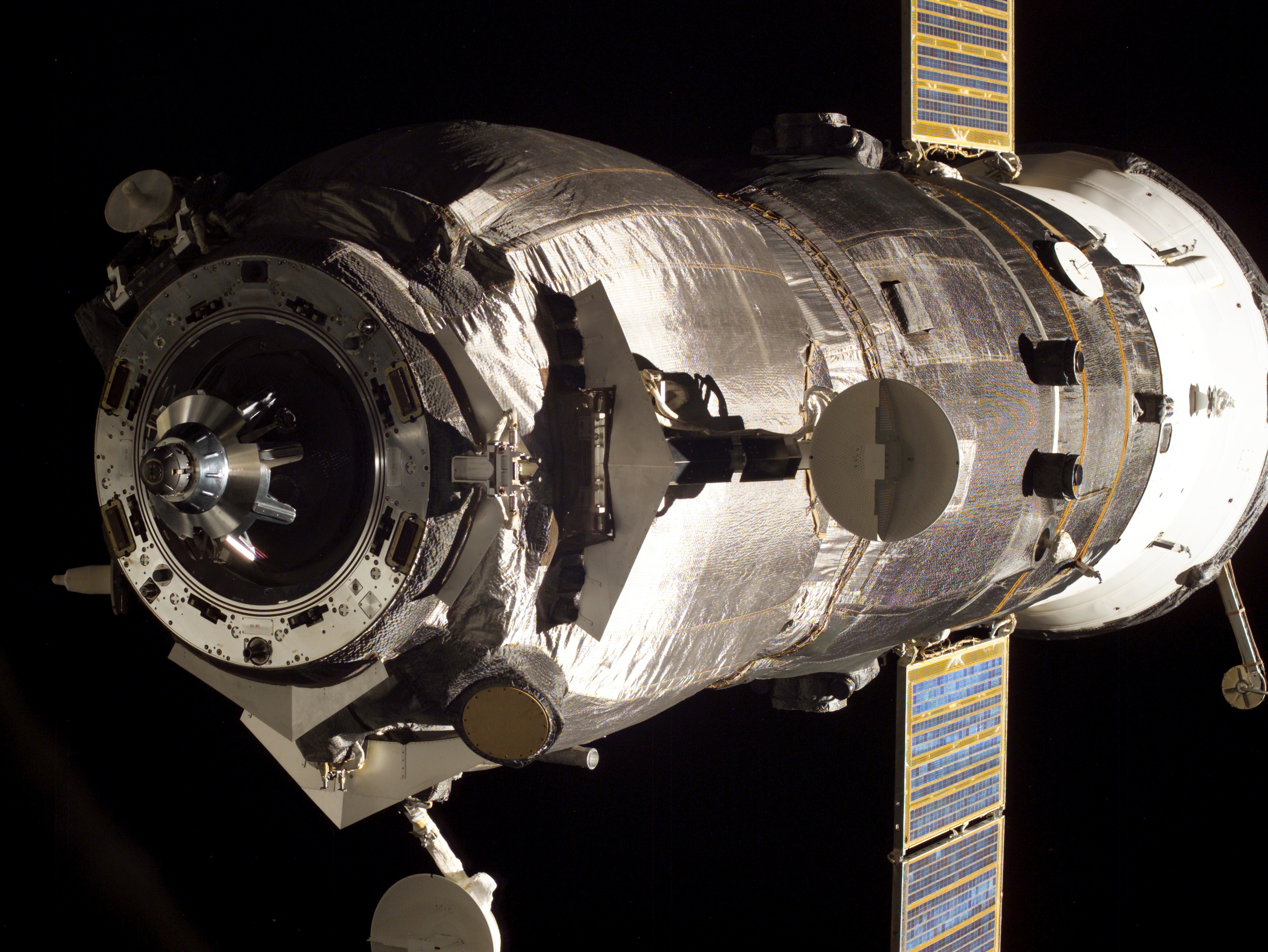
- Progress M-55 departing the ISS.
- Mission type: ISS resupply
- Operator: Roskosmos
- COSPAR ID: 2005-047A
- SATCAT no.: 28906
- Mission duration: 181 days

Spacecraft properties
- Spacecraft type: Progress-M s/n 355
- Manufacturer: RKK Energia
- Launch mass: 5700 kg

Start of mission
- Launch date: 21 December 2005, 18:38:20 UTC
- Rocket: Soyuz-U
- Launch site: Baikonur, Site 1/5

End of mission
- Disposal: Deorbited
- Decay date: 19 June 2006, 17:53:14 UTC

Orbital parameters
- Reference system: Geocentric
- Regime: Low Earth
- Inclination: 51.6°
- Epoch: 21 December 2005

Docking with ISS
- Docking port: Pirs
- Docking date: 23 December 2005, 19:46:18 UTC
- Undocking date: 19 June 2006, 14:06:01 UTC
- Time docked: 179 days

Cargo
- Mass: 1400 kg (equipment and spare parts)
- Fuel: 880 kg
- Gaseous: 83 kg
- Water: 210 kg
- Progress ISS Resupply

Progress M-55 (Russian: Прогресс М-55), identified by NASA as Progress 20P, was a Progress spacecraft used to resupply the International Space Station. It was a Progress-M 11F615A55 spacecraft, with the serial number 355.

== Launch ==
Progress M-55 was launched by a Soyuz-U carrier rocket from Site 1/5 at the Baikonur Cosmodrome. Launch occurred at 18:38:20 UTC on 21 December 2005.

== Docking ==
The spacecraft docked with the Pirs module at 19:46:18 UTC on 23 December 2005. It remained docked for almost 179 days before undocking at 14:06:01 UTC on 19 June 2006 to make way for Progress M-57. It was deorbited at 17:06:01 UTC on 19 June 2006. The spacecraft burned up in the atmosphere over the Pacific Ocean, with any remaining debris landing in the ocean at around 17:53:14 UTC.

Progress M-55 carried supplies to the International Space Station, including food, water and oxygen for the crew and equipment for conducting scientific research.

== See also ==
- List of Progress flights
- Uncrewed spaceflights to the International Space Station
