= Progress M-63 =

Russian cargo spacecraft

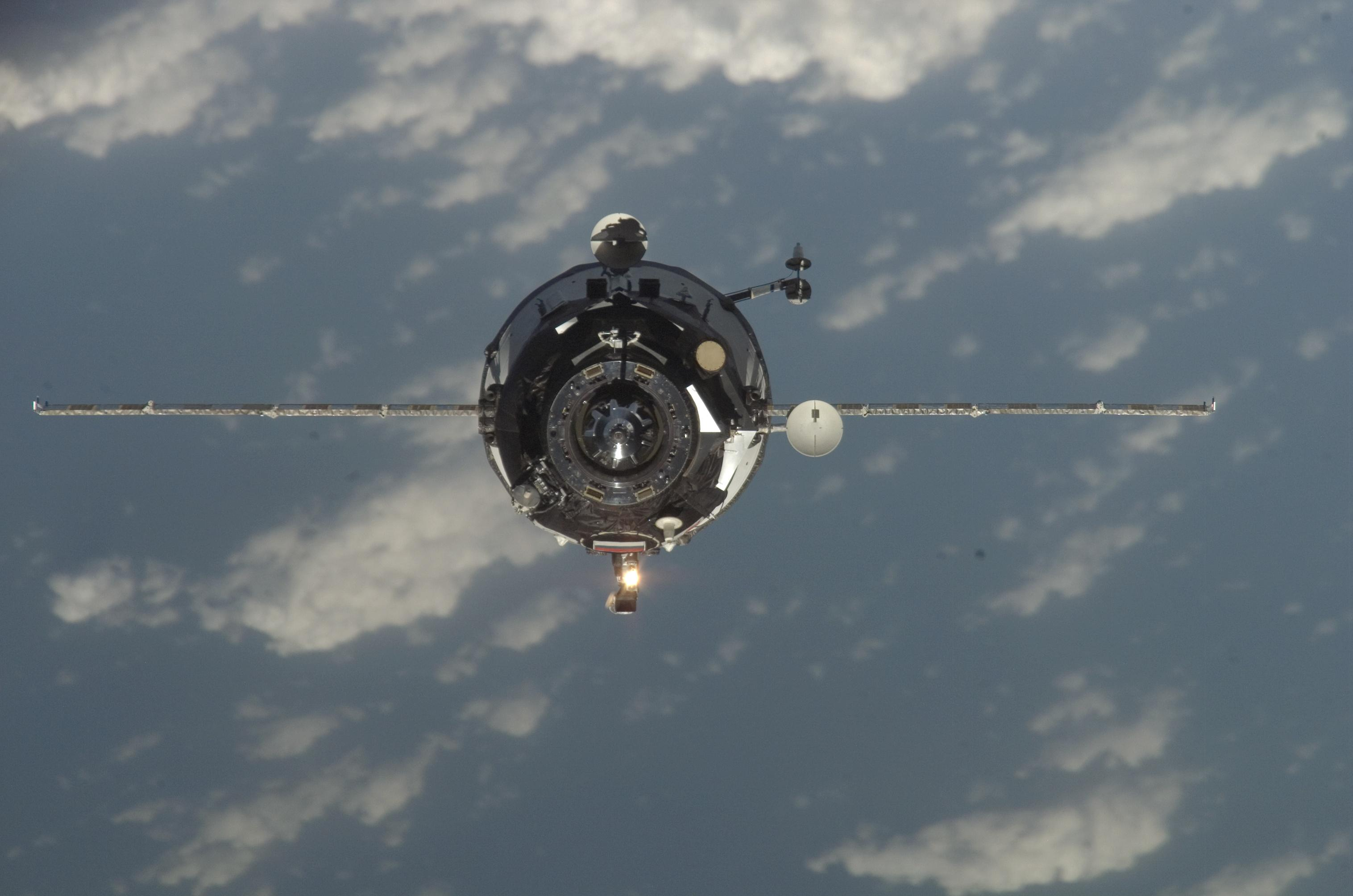
- Progress M-63 approaching the ISS.
- Mission type: ISS resupply
- Operator: Roskosmos
- COSPAR ID: 2008-004A
- SATCAT no.: 32484
- Mission duration: 62 days

Spacecraft properties
- Spacecraft type: Progress-M s/n 363
- Manufacturer: RKK Energia

Start of mission
- Launch date: 5 February 2008, 13:02 UTC
- Rocket: Soyuz-U
- Launch site: Baikonur, Site 1/5

End of mission
- Disposal: Deorbited
- Decay date: 7 April 2008, 12:36 UTC

Orbital parameters
- Reference system: Geocentric
- Regime: Low Earth
- Perigee altitude: 333 km
- Apogee altitude: 343 km
- Inclination: 51.6°
- Period: 91.29 minutes
- Epoch: 5 February 2008

Docking with ISS
- Docking port: Pirs
- Docking date: 7 February 2008, 14:38 UTC
- Undocking date: 7 April 2008, 08:49 UTC
- Time docked: 60 days

Cargo
- Mass: 2326 kg
- Pressurised: 1326.6 kg (dry cargo)
- Fuel: 528.5 kg
- Gaseous: 46 kg (oxygen and air)
- Water: 419.5 kg
- Progress ISS Resupply

Progress M-63 (Russian: Прогресс М-63), identified by NASA as Progress 28P, was a Progress spacecraft used to resupply the International Space Station. It was a Progress-M 11F615A55 spacecraft, with the serial number 363.

== Launch ==
Progress M-63 was launched by a Soyuz-U carrier rocket from Site 1/5 at the Baikonur Cosmodrome. Launch occurred at 13:02 UTC on 5 February 2008.

== Docking ==
The spacecraft docked with the Pirs module at 14:38 UTC on 7 February 2008. Pirs had been vacated by the departure of Progress M-62 which had undocked on 4 February 2008. Progress M-63 successfully docked using the automated Kurs system; cosmonaut Yuri Malenchenko was standing by to guide it in using the backup manual TORU system should it have been necessary. Progress M-63 remained docked for 60 days before undocking at 08:49 UTC on 7 April 2008. It was deorbited at 11:50 UTC on 7 April 2008. The spacecraft burned up in the atmosphere over the Pacific Ocean, with any remaining debris landing in the ocean at around 12:36 UTC.

Progress M-63 carried supplies to the International Space Station, including food, water and oxygen for the crew and equipment for conducting scientific research. Its cargo consisted of over 528.5 kilograms (1,165 lb) of propellant, 46 kilograms (101 lb) of oxygen and air, approximately 419.5 kilograms (925 lb) of water and 1,326.6 kilograms (2,925 lb) of dry cargo. The total mass of its cargo was 2,326 kilograms (5,128 lb).

== See also ==
- List of Progress flights
- Uncrewed spaceflights to the International Space Station
