= Progress M-57 =

Russian cargo spacecraft

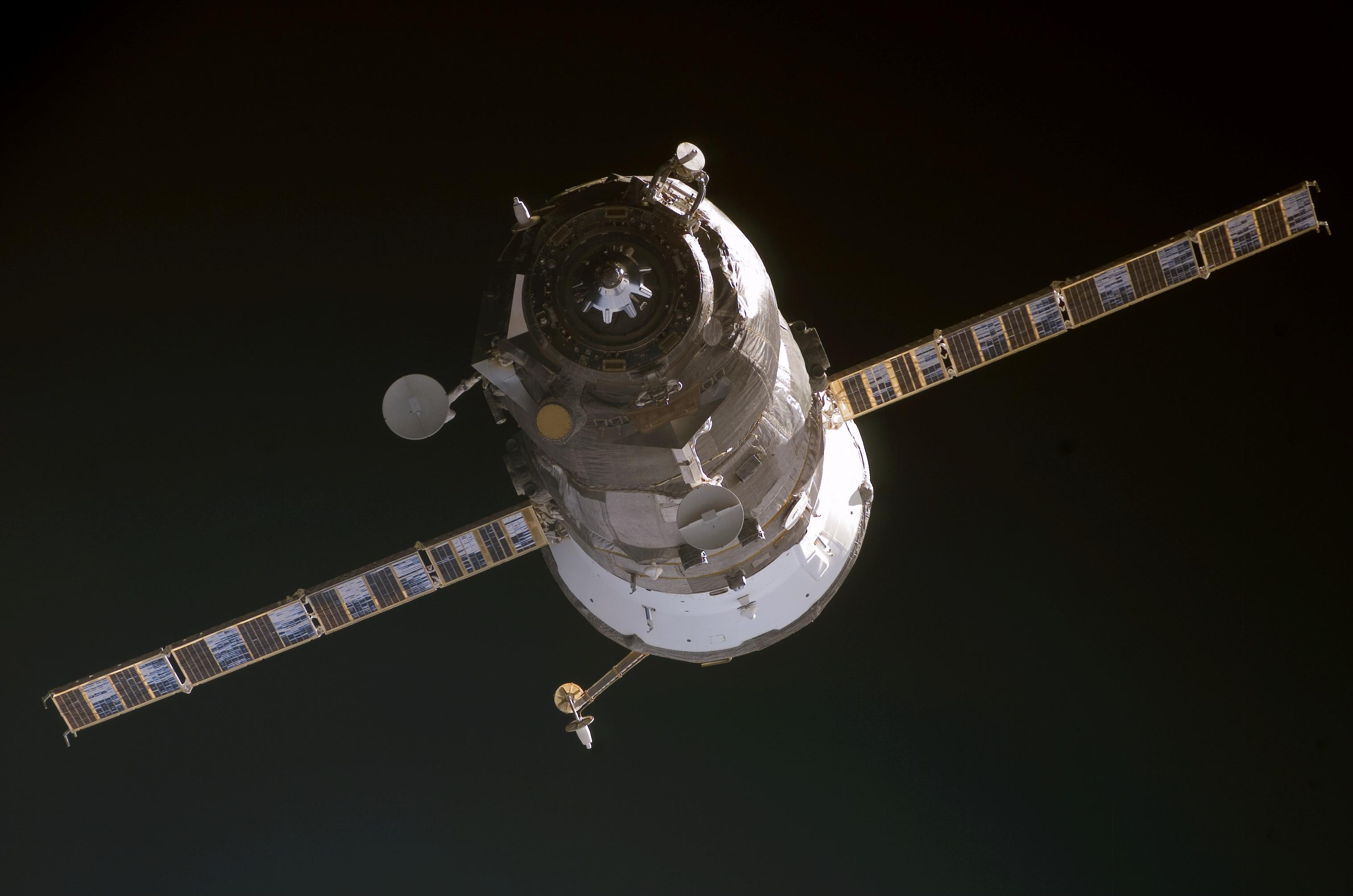
- Progress M-57 approaching the ISS.
- Mission type: ISS resupply
- Operator: Roskosmos
- COSPAR ID: 2006-025A
- SATCAT no.: 29245
- Mission duration: 207 days

Spacecraft properties
- Spacecraft type: Progress-M s/n 357
- Manufacturer: RKK Energia

Start of mission
- Launch date: 24 June 2006, 15:08:18 UTC
- Rocket: Soyuz-U
- Launch site: Baikonur, Site 1/5

End of mission
- Disposal: Deorbited
- Decay date: 17 January 2007, 03:15:20 UTC

Orbital parameters
- Reference system: Geocentric
- Regime: Low Earth
- Perigee altitude: 193 km
- Apogee altitude: 245 km
- Inclination: 51.6°
- Period: 88.6 minutes
- Epoch: 24 June 2006

Docking with ISS
- Docking port: Pirs
- Docking date: 26 June 2006, 16:25 UTC
- Undocking date: 16 January 2007, 23:23:52 UTC
- Time docked: 204 days

Cargo
- Mass: 3000 kg
- Progress ISS Resupply

Progress M-57 (Russian: Прогресс М-57), identified by NASA as Progress 22P, was a Progress spacecraft used to resupply the International Space Station. It was a Progress-M 11F615A55 spacecraft, with the serial number 357.

== Launch ==
Progress M-57 was launched by a Soyuz-U carrier rocket from Site 1/5 at the Baikonur Cosmodrome. Launch occurred at 15:08:18 UTC on 24 June 2006.

== Docking ==
The spacecraft docked with the Pirs module at 16:25 UTC on 26 June. It remained docked for 204 days before undocking at 23:23:52 UTC on 16 January 2007 to make way for Progress M-59. It was deorbited at 02:29 UTC on 17 January 2007. The spacecraft burned up in the atmosphere over the Pacific Ocean, with any remaining debris landing in the ocean at around 03:15:20 UTC.

Progress M-57 carried supplies to the International Space Station, including food, water and oxygen for the crew and equipment for conducting scientific research.

== See also ==
- List of Progress flights
- Uncrewed spaceflights to the International Space Station
