= Progress M-20M =

Russian unmanned spacecraft

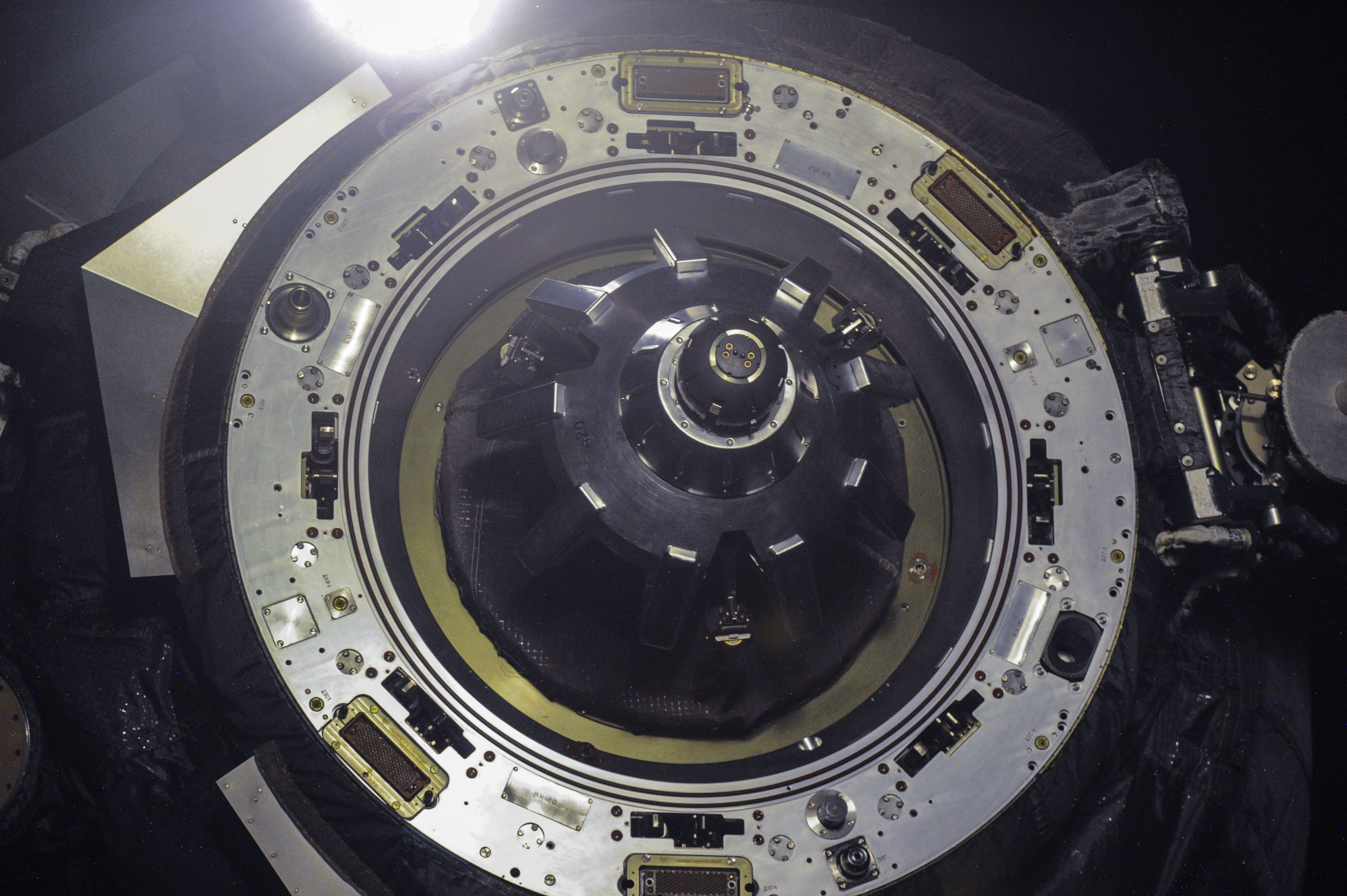
- Progress M-20M undocking from the Pirs docking module on 3 February 2014.
- Mission type: ISS resupply
- Operator: Roskosmos
- COSPAR ID: 2013-039A
- SATCAT no.: 39219
- Mission duration: 199 days

Spacecraft properties
- Spacecraft type: Progress-M s/n 420
- Manufacturer: RKK Energia
- Launch mass: 6950 kg

Start of mission
- Launch date: 27 July 2013, 20:45:08 UTC
- Rocket: Soyuz-U
- Launch site: Baikonur, 31/6

End of mission
- Disposal: Deorbited
- Decay date: 11 February 2014, 15:55 UTC

Orbital parameters
- Reference system: Geocentric
- Regime: Low Earth
- Perigee altitude: 413.0 km
- Apogee altitude: 418.0 km
- Inclination: 51.6°
- Period: 92.88 minutes
- Epoch: 27 July 2013

Docking with ISS
- Docking port: Pirs
- Docking date: 28 July 2013, 02:26 UTC
- Undocking date: 3 February 2014, 16:21 UTC
- Time docked: 190 days
- Progress ISS Resupply

Progress M-20M (Russian: Прогресс М-20М), identified by NASA as Progress 52P, is a Progress spacecraft used by Roskosmos to resupply the International Space Station (ISS) during 2013. Progress M-20M was built by RKK Energia. Progress M-20M was launched on a 6-hours rendezvous profile towards the ISS. The 20th Progress-M 11F615A60 spacecraft to be launched, it had the serial number 420 and was built by RKK Energia.

== Launch ==
The spacecraft was launched on 27 July 2013 at 20:45 UTC from the Baikonur Cosmodrome in Kazakhstan. The launch was the first out of Baikonur since a disastrous Proton-M failure on 2 July 2013.

== Docking ==
Progress M-20M docked with the Pirs docking compartment on 28 July 2013 at 02:26 UTC, less than six hours after launch.

== Cargo ==
Some last minute items were added to the Progress to assist the station astronauts with figuring out why the cooling system on one of the American spacesuits sprung a leak and caused a spacewalk to be aborted the previous week.

== Undocking and reentry ==
Progress M-20M undocked from the ISS on 3 February 2014.
