= Pirs (ISS module) =

Docking compartment of the ISS

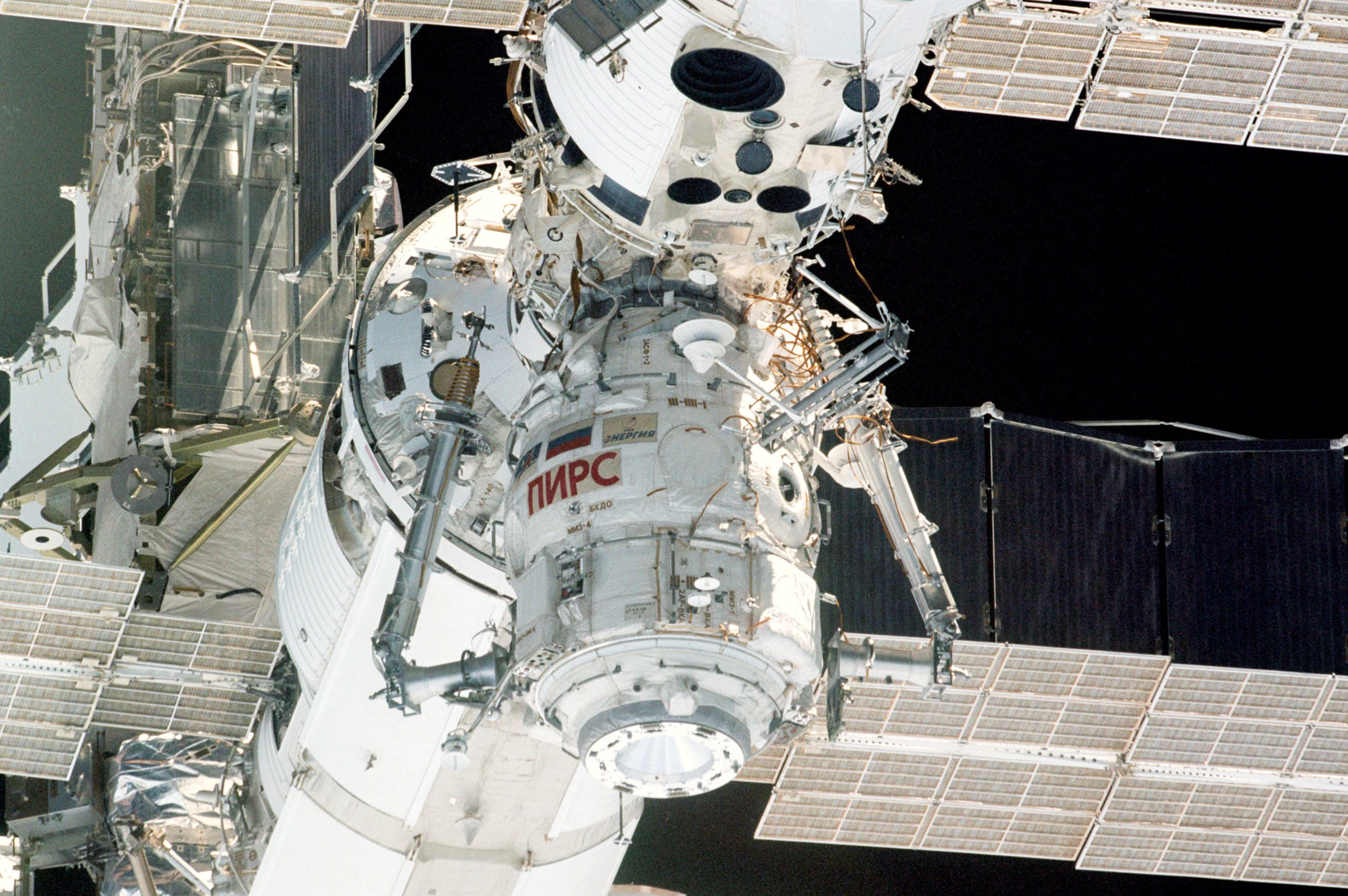
- The Pirs module attached to the International Space Station.

Module statistics
- COSPAR ID: 2001-041A
- Launch date: 14 September 2001, 23:34:55 UTC
- Launch vehicle: Soyuz-U
- Docked

Docking with ISS
- Docking port: Zvezda nadir
- Docking date: 17 September 2001 01:05 UTC
- Time docked: 19 years, 10 months and 9 days
- Reentry: 26 July 2021, 14:51 UTC
- Mass: 3,580 kg (7,890 lb)
- Length: 4.91 m (16.1 ft)
- Diameter: 2.55 m (8 ft 4 in)
- Pressurised volume: 13 m^{3} (460 cu ft)

Pirs (Russian: Пирс, meaning "pier") – also called Stykovochny Otsek 1 (SO-1; Russian: Стыковочный отсек, "docking module") and DC-1 (Docking Compartment 1) – was a Russian module on the International Space Station (ISS). Pirs was launched on 14 September 2001, and was located on the Zvezda module of the station. It provided the ISS with one docking port for Soyuz and Progress spacecraft, and allowed egress and ingress for spacewalks by cosmonauts using Russian Orlan space suits. Pirs was docked to Zvezda for almost 20 years, until 26 July 2021, when it was decommissioned and undocked by Progress MS-16 to make way for the new Nauka module.

== Poisk module ==
A second docking compartment, Stykovochniy Otsek 2 (SO-2), was planned with the same design. However, when the Russian segment of the ISS was redesigned in 2001, the new design no longer included the SO-2, and its construction was canceled. After another change of plans the SO-2 module finally evolved into the Poisk module, which was added to the ISS in 2009.

== Design and construction ==
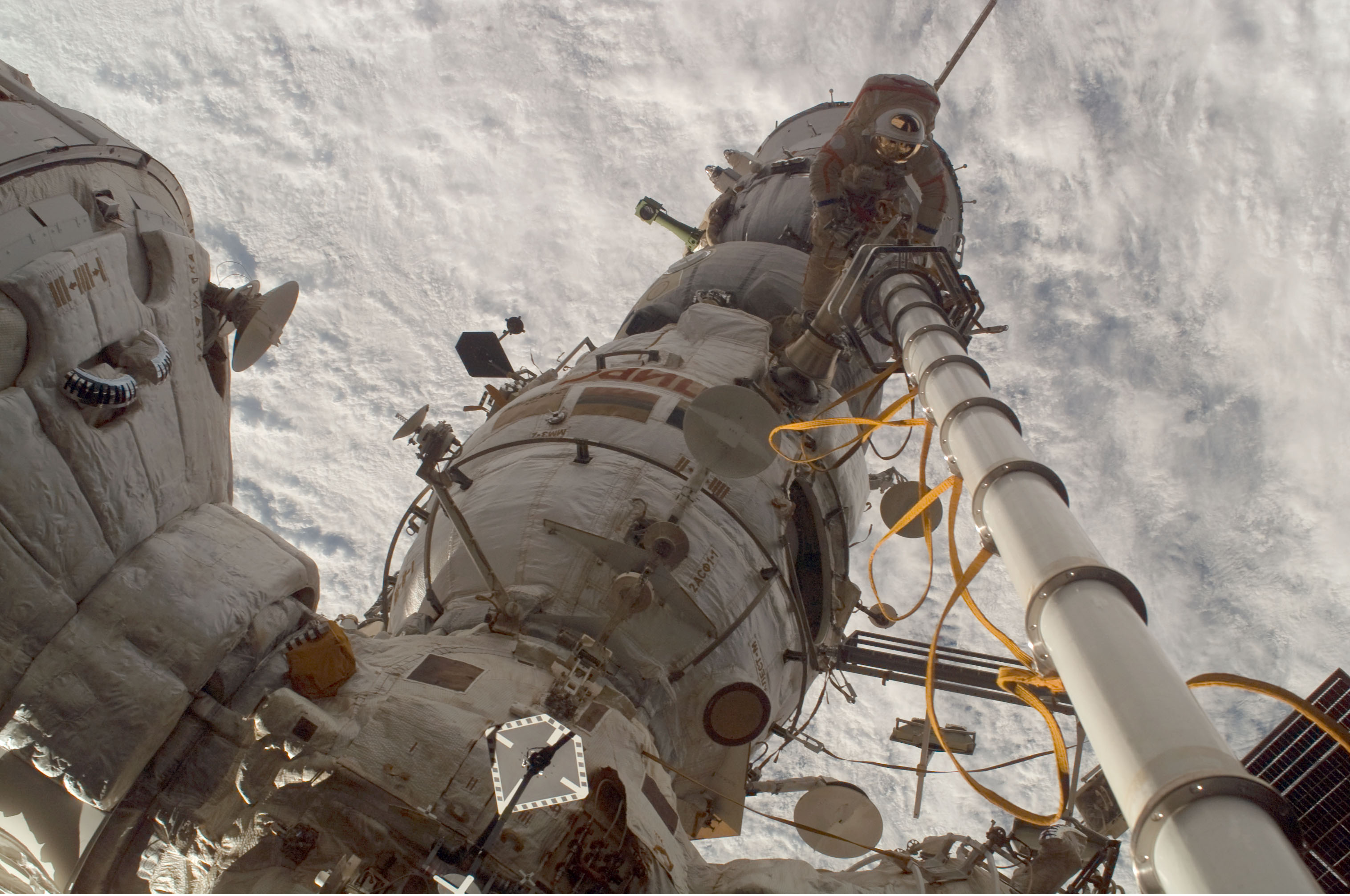
The flight engineer Oleg Kononenko photographs commander Sergey Volkov operating the manual Strela crane holding him. The commander stands on Pirs and has his back to the Soyuz spacecraft. Zarya is seen to the left and Zvezda across the bottom of the image.

The Pirs docking compartment had two primary functions: to provide a docking port for visiting Soyuz and Progress spacecraft and to serve as an airlock for Russian EVAs. The docking port could accommodate one Soyuz-MS or one Progress-MS spacecraft. Visiting spacecraft could deliver people and cargo to and from the space station. In addition, the Docking Compartment could transfer fuel from the fuel tanks of a docked Progress resupply vehicle to either the Zvezda Service Module's Integrated Propulsion System or the Zarya Functional Cargo Block. It could also transfer propellant from Zvezda and Zarya to the propulsion system of docked vehicles — Soyuz and Progress. The two airlocks were designed to accommodate spacewalking cosmonauts wearing Russian Orlan-M spacesuits. The Pirs docking compartment was manufactured by RKK Energia. The Docking Compartment was similar to the Mir Docking Module used on the earlier Mir space station. The docking compartment's planned lifetime as part of the station was five years.

== Launch ==
Pirs was launched on 14 September 2001, as ISS Assembly Mission 4R, on a Russian Soyuz-U launch vehicle, using a modified Progress spacecraft, Progress DC-1, as an upper stage. The 3,580 kg (7,890 lb) Pirs Docking Compartment was attached to the nadir (bottom, Earth-facing) port of the Zvezda service module.

== Dockings ==
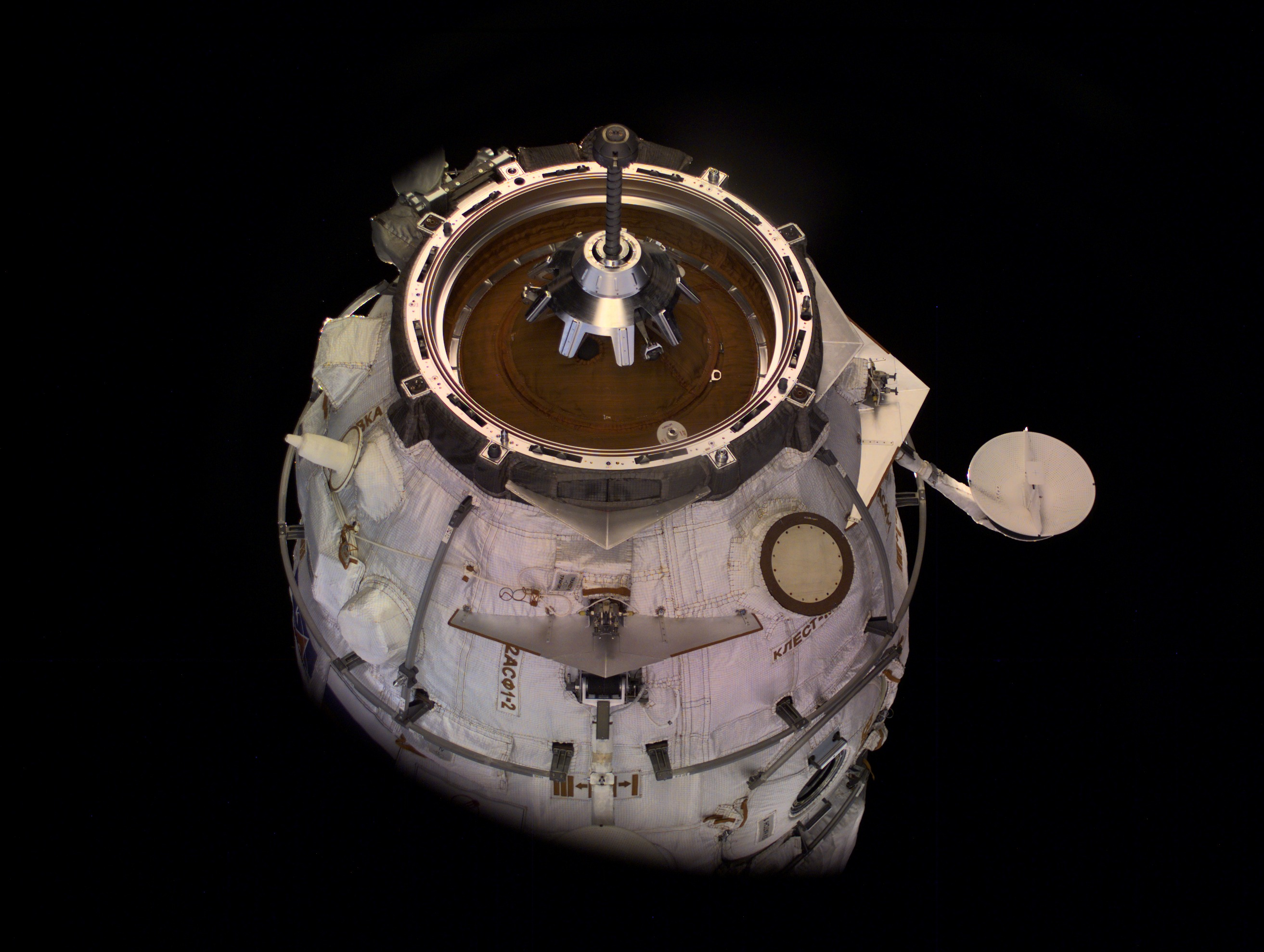
Progress DC-1 and Pirs approaches ISS

Pirs docked to the Zvedza module of the International Space Station on 17 September 2001, at 01:05 UTC, and was configured during three spacewalks by the Expedition 3 crew. Two Strela cargo cranes were later added by the STS-96 and STS-101 missions, carried up on Integrated Cargo Carriers and installed during EVAs.

All spacecraft that docked with Pirs were launched from Baikonur Cosmodrome.

Spacecraft	Launch (UTC)	Launch vehicle	Launch pad	Docking	Undocking	Deorbit	Remarks
Progress DC-1	14 September 2001; 23:34:55	Soyuz-U	Site 1/5	—N/a	26 September 2001; 15:36	27 September 2001; 00:01	ISS-4R. Modified Progress spacecraft used as a tug to deliver Pirs to the ISS.
Soyuz TM-32	28 April 2001; 07:37:20	Soyuz-U	Site 1/5	19 October 2001; 11:04	31 October 2001; 01:38	31 October 2001; 05:00:00	ISS-2S. Had been docked to Zarya since 30 April 2001. Served as lifeboat for Expedition 2 and Expedition 3. Returned with crew launched on Soyuz TM-33.
Soyuz TM-33	21 October 2001; 08:59:35	Soyuz-U	Site 1/5	20 April 2002; 09:37	5 May 2002; 00:31	5 May 2002; 03:51:53	ISS-3S. Had been docked to Zarya since 23 October 2001. Served as lifeboat for Expedition 3 and Expedition 4. Returned with crew launched on Soyuz TM-34.
Soyuz TMA-1	30 October 2002; 03:11:11	Soyuz-FG	Site 1/5	1 November 2002; 05:01:20	3 May 2003; 22:43:00	4 May 2003; 02:04:25	ISS-5S. Crew returned on Soyuz TM-34. Returned with Expedition 6 crew launched on STS-113 due to suspension of Space Shuttle flights following the Space Shuttle Columbia disaster. Maiden flight of Soyuz TMA capsule and first launch of Soyuz-FG booster.
Progress M1-10	8 June 2003; 10:34:00	Soyuz-U	Site 1/5	11 June 2003; 11:14:53	4 September 2003; 19:41:44	3 October 2003; 12:38:49	ISS-11P. Performed an Earth observation mission after undocking.
Soyuz TMA-3	18 October 2003; 05:38:03	Soyuz-FG	Site 1/5	20 October 2003; 07:16	29 April 2004; 20:52	30 April 2004; 00:11:15	ISS-7S delivering Expedition 8. Visiting crew member returned with Expedition 7 on Soyuz TMA-2. Returned with visiting crew member launched on Soyuz TMA-4.
Soyuz TMA-5	14 October 2004; 03:06	Soyuz-FG	Site 1/5	16 October 2004; 04:16	29 November 2004; 09:29	24 April 2005; 22:08	ISS-9S delivering Expedition 10. Visiting crew member returned with Expedition 9 on Soyuz TMA-4. Translated to Zarya after undocking.
Soyuz TMA-6	15 April 2005; 00:46:25	Soyuz-FG	Site 1/5	17 April 2005; 02:20	19 July 2005; 10:38	11 October 2005; 01:09:00	ISS-10S delivering Expedition 11. Visiting crew member returned with Expedition 10 on Soyuz TMA-5. Translated to Zarya after undocking.
Progress M-55	21 December 2005; 18:38:20	Soyuz-U	Site 1/5	23 December 2005; 19:46:18	19 June 2006; 14:06:01	19 June 2006; 17:53:14	ISS-20P
Progress M-57	Soyuz-U	Site 1/5	24 June 2006; 15:08:18	26 June 2006; 16:25	16 January 2007; 23:23:52	17 January 2007; 03:15:20	ISS-22P
Progress M-59	18 January 2007; 02:12:13	Soyuz-U	Site 1/5	20 January 2007; 01:59	1 August 2007; 14:07	1 August 2007; 19:26	ISS-24P
Progress M-61	2 August 2007; 17:33:47	Soyuz-U	Site 1/5	5 August 2007; 18:40	22 December 2007; 03:59	22 January 2008; 19:51	ISS-26P. Performed independent experiments after undocking.
Progress M-62	23 December 2007; 07:12:41	Soyuz-U	Site 1/5	26 December 2007; 08:14	4 February 2008; 10:32	15 February 2008; 13:29	ISS-27P. Performed Earth observation experiments after undocking.
Progress M-63	5 February 2008; 13:02	Soyuz-U	Site 1/5	7 February 2008; 14:38	7 April 2008; 08:49	7 April 2008; 12:36	ISS-28P
Soyuz TMA-12	8 April 2008; 11:16:39	Soyuz-FG	Site 1/5	10 April 2008; 12:57	24 October 2008; 00:16	24 October 2008; 03:37	ISS-16S delivering Expedition 17. Visiting crew member returned with Expedition 11 on Soyuz TMA-11. Returned with visiting crew member launched on Soyuz TMA-13.
Progress M-01M	26 November 2008; 12:38	Soyuz-U	Site 1/5	30 November 2008; 12:28	6 February 2009; 04:10	8 February 2009; 08:20	ISS-31P. Maiden flight of the Progress M-M spacecraft.
Progress M-66	10 February 2009; 05:49	Soyuz-U	Site 1/5	13 February 2009; 07:18	6 May 2009; 15:18	18 May 2009; 15:14:45	ISS-32P
Progress M-02M	7 May 2009; 18:37:09	Soyuz-U	Site 1/5	12 May 2009; 19:24:23	30 June 2009; 18:29:43	13 July 2009; 16:28:47	ISS-33P
Soyuz TMA-14	26 March 2009; 11:49:18	Soyuz-FG	Site 1/5	2 July 2009; 21:54	11 October 2009; 01:07	11 October 2009; 04:32	ISS-18S. Had been docked to Zvedza since 28 March 2009 after delivering Expedition 19. Returned with visiting crew member launched on Soyuz TMA-16.
Progress M-03M	15 October 2009; 01:14	Soyuz-U	Site 1/5	18 October 2009; 01:40	22 April 2010; 16:32	27 April 2010; 18:07	ISS-35P
Progress M-05M	28 April 2010; 17:15	Soyuz-U	Site 1/5	1 May 2010; 18:30	25 October 2010; 14:25	15 November 2010; 08:50	ISS-37P
Progress M-08M	27 October 2010; 15:11:50	Soyuz-U	Site 1/5	30 October 2010; 16:36	24 January 2011; 00:42	24 January 2011; 06:07	ISS-40P
Progress M-09M	29 January 2011; 01:31:39	Soyuz-U	Site 1/5	30 January 2011; 02:39	22 April 2011; 12:38	26 April 2011; 13:23	ISS-41P
Progress M-10M	27 April 2011; 13:05:21	Soyuz-U	Site 1/5	29 April 2011; 14:29	29 October 2011; 09:04	29 October 2011; 13:00	ISS-42P
Progress M-13M	30 October 2011; 10:11:00	Soyuz-U	Site 1/5	2 November 2011; 11:41	23 January 2012; 22:10	25 January 2012; 02:25	ISS-45P
Progress M-14M	25 January 2012; 23:06:40	Soyuz-U	Site 1/5	28 January 2012; 00:08:57	19 April 2012; 11:04	28 April 2012; 13:46	ISS-46P
Progress M-15M	20 April 2012; 12:50:24	Soyuz-U	Site 1/5	22 April 2012; 14:40:43	22 July 2012; 20:27	20 August 2012	ISS-47P. Spacecraft was equipped with an upgraded version of the Kurs automated docking system. The initial docking was performed using the older version of the Kurs system while the second docking was performed to test the Kurs-NA system. An initial attempt was aborted on 24 July after the new system failed to activate.
Progress M-15M	20 April 2012; 12:50:24	Soyuz-U	Site 1/5	29 July 2012; 01:00	30 July 2012; 21:16	20 August 2012	ISS-47P. Spacecraft was equipped with an upgraded version of the Kurs automated docking system. The initial docking was performed using the older version of the Kurs system while the second docking was performed to test the Kurs-NA system. An initial attempt was aborted on 24 July after the new system failed to activate.
Progress M-16M	1 August 2012; 19:35:13	Soyuz-U	Site 1/5	2 August 2012; 01:24:39	9 February 2013; 13:16	9 February 2013; 17:05	ISS-48P
Progress M-18M	11 February 2013; 14:41:46	Soyuz-U	Site 1/5	12 February 2013; 20:35	25 July 2013; 20:43	26 July 2013; 00:42	ISS-50P
Progress M-20M	27 July 2013; 20:45:08	Soyuz-U	Site 1/5	28 July 2013; 02:26	3 February 2014; 16:21	11 February 2014; 15:55	ISS-52P
Progress M-22M	5 February 2014; 16:23:32	Soyuz-U	Site 1/5	5 February 2014; 22:22	7 April 2014; 13:58	18 April 2014; 15:46	ISS-54P
Progress M-23M	9 April 2014; 15:26:27	Soyuz-U	Site 1/5	9 April 2014; 21:14	21 July 2014; 21:44	31 July 2014; 22:42	ISS-55P
Progress M-24M	23 July 2014; 21:44:44	Soyuz-U	Site 1/5	24 July 2014; 03:31	27 October 2014; 05:32	19 November 2014; 23:46	ISS-56P
Progress M-25M	29 October 2014; 07:09:43	Soyuz-U	Site 1/5	29 October 2014; 13:08	25 April 2015; 06:41:14	26 April 2015; 13:00	ISS-57P
Progress M-28M	3 July 2015; 04:55:48	Soyuz-U	Site 1/5	5 July 2015; 07:11	19 December 2015; 07:35	19 December 2015; 11:28	ISS-60P
Progress MS-01	21 December 2015; 08:44:39	Soyuz-2.1a	Site 31/6	23 December 2015; 10:27:02	1 July 2016; 05:36	3 July 2016; 07:50	ISS-62P. Maiden flight of the Progress MS spacecraft. A brief test using the TORU manual docking system was performed after initial undocking.
Progress MS-01	21 December 2015; 08:44:39	Soyuz-2.1a	Site 31/6	1 July 2016; 06:04	2 July 2016; 23:48	3 July 2016; 07:50	ISS-62P. Maiden flight of the Progress MS spacecraft. A brief test using the TORU manual docking system was performed after initial undocking.
Progress MS-03	16 July 2016; 21:41:55	Soyuz-U	Site 31/6	19 July 2016; 00:20	31 January 2017; 14:25	31 January 2017; 17:34	ISS-64P
Progress MS-05	22 February 2017; 05:58:33	Soyuz-U	Site 1/5	24 February 2017; 08:34	20 July 2017; 17:46	20 July 2017; 20:58	ISS-66P. Final launch of the Soyuz-U booster.
Progress MS-07	14 October 2017; 08:46:53	Soyuz-2.1a	Site 31/6	16 October 2017; 11:04:07	28 March 2018; 13:50:30	26 April 2018	ISS-68P
Progress MS-09	9 July 2018; 21:51:34	Soyuz-2.1a	Site 31/6	10 July 2018; 01:31:33	25 January 2019; 12:55	25 January 2019	ISS-70P
Progress MS-11	4 April 2019; 11:01:34	Soyuz-2.1a	Site 31/6	4 April 2019; 14:22:26	29 July 2019; 10:43	29 July 2019	ISS-72P
Progress MS-12	31 July 2019; 12:10:46	Soyuz-2.1a	Site 31/6	31 July 2019; 15:29	29 November 2019; 10:25	29 November 2019; 14:19	ISS-73P
Progress MS-13	6 December 2019; 09:34:11	Soyuz-2.1a	Site 31/6	9 December 2019; 10:35:11	8 July 2020; 18:22	8 July 2020; 22:05	ISS-74P
Progress MS-15	23 July 2020; 14:26:21	Soyuz-2.1a	Site 31/6	23 July 2020; 17:45	9 February 2021; 05:21	9 February 2021; 09:13	ISS-76P
Progress MS-16	15 February 2021; 04:45:06	Soyuz-2.1a	Site 31/6	17 February 2021; 06:27	—N/a	26 July 2021; 14:51	ISS-77P. Deorbited Pirs after undocking from the ISS to make way for Nauka.

== Airlock specifications ==
- Length: 4.91 m (16.1 ft)
- Diameter: 2.55 m (8 ft 4 in)
- Weight: 3,580 kg (7,890 lb)
- Volume: 13 m^{3} (460 cu ft)

== Docking location at the ISS ==
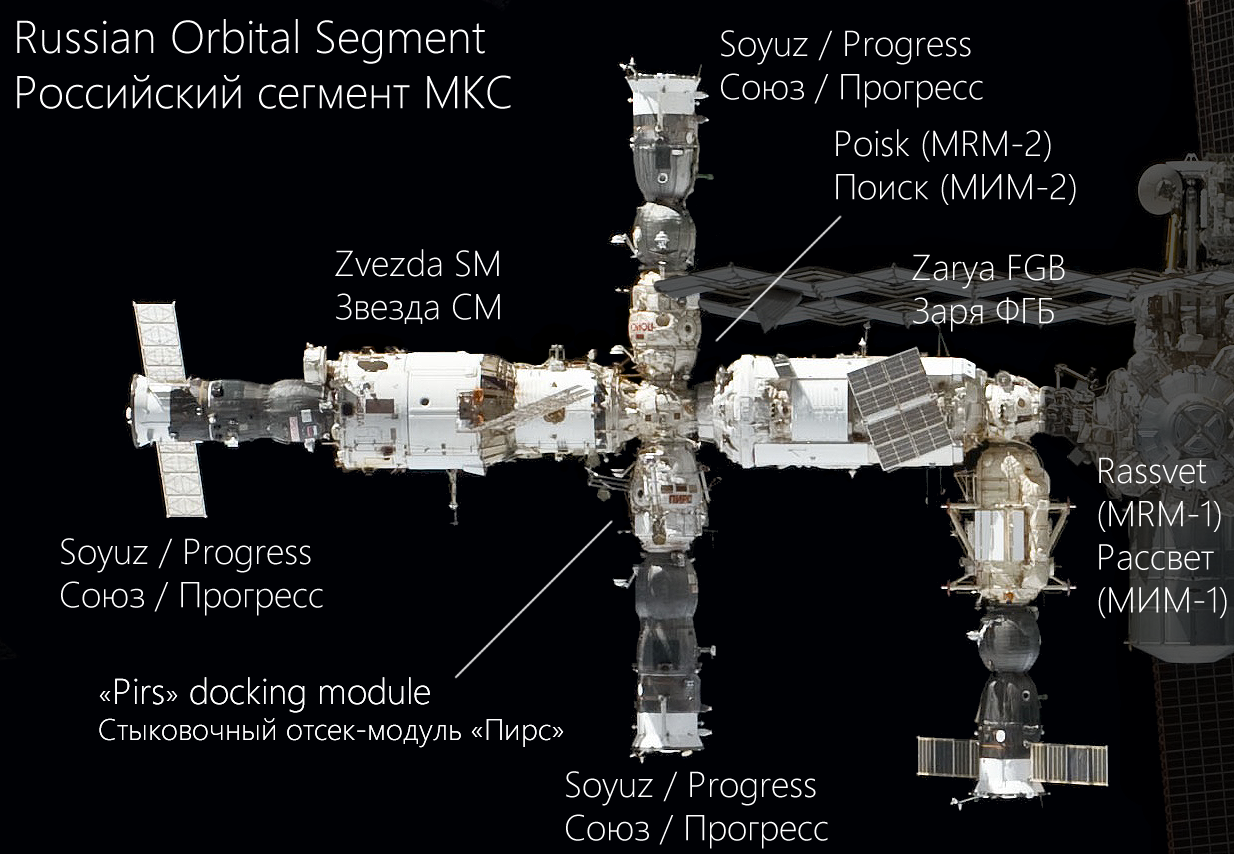
The location of Pirs was the "Russian Orbital Segment", seen here from the starboard side – Pirs is the white module below the center of the image, with a dark-gray Progress spacecraft docked to its nadir port.

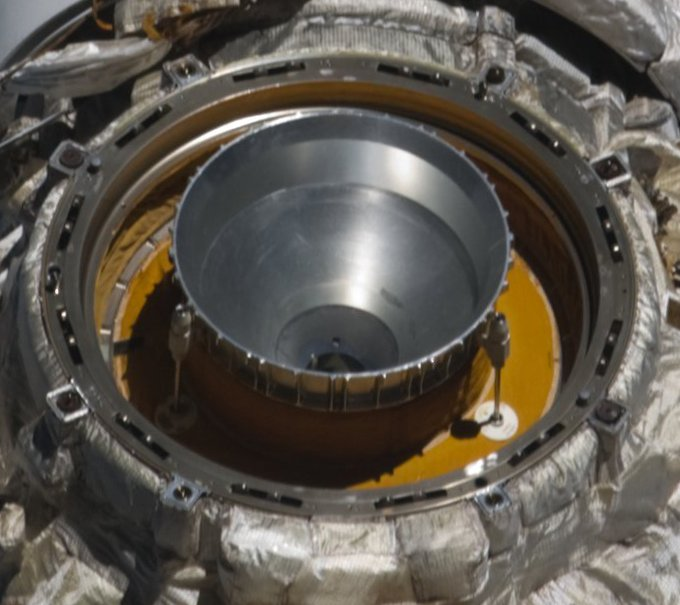
Nadir Docking port on Zvezda, the docking location of Pirs Module. (now Nauka Module)

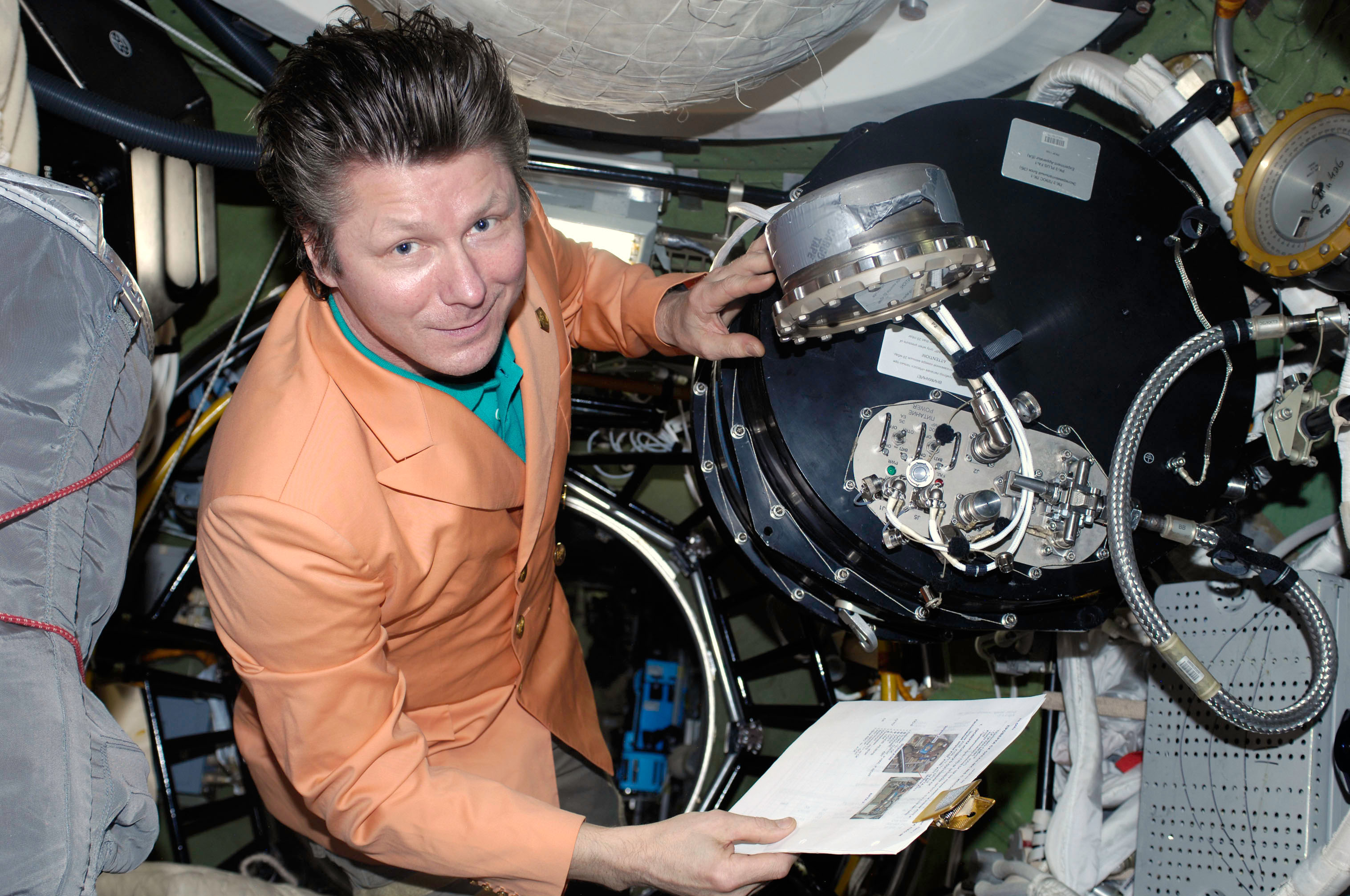
ISS crewmember Gennady Padalka inside Zvezda's docking hub leading to Pirs.

== Undocking and disposal ==
On 14 July 2021, Roskosmos announced that members of the 65th expedition aboard the ISS, were preparing the Pirs module for its departure on 23 July.

The Pirs module supported 52 spacewalks and served as a docking port for Russian Soyuz and Progress spacecraft ferrying crew and cargo to and from the space station. After nearly 20 years at the International Space Station, ISS, the Pirs Docking Compartment, SO1, undocked from the nadir (Earth-facing) port of the Zvezda Service Module, SM, on 26 July 2021, at 13:55 Moscow Time (6:55 a.m. EDT) in the joint stack with the Progress MS-16 cargo ship. At the time, the spacecraft was orbiting the Earth over Eastern China and within communications range of Russian ground stations.

Within four minutes (13:59:00 Moscow Time, according to schedule), Progress MS-16 performed a short separation burn to increase distance from the ISS. The deorbiting maneuver was planned within around three hours aiming at the reentry of the Pirs/Progress stack over the Pacific.

Progress MS-16 initiated braking maneuver as planned at 17:01 Moscow Time (10:01 a.m. EDT) and after a 1,057-second (17.6-minute) burn, the module/cargo ship duo reentered the dense atmosphere at 17:42 Moscow Time (10:42 a.m. EDT).

According to NASA, the Pirs Docking Compartment spent 19 years, 313 days 9 hours 50 minutes and 45 seconds at the station and 19 years 315 days 15 hours 10 minutes and 47 seconds in flight.

== Gallery ==
=== Outside ===
Hover over each photo to view label detail

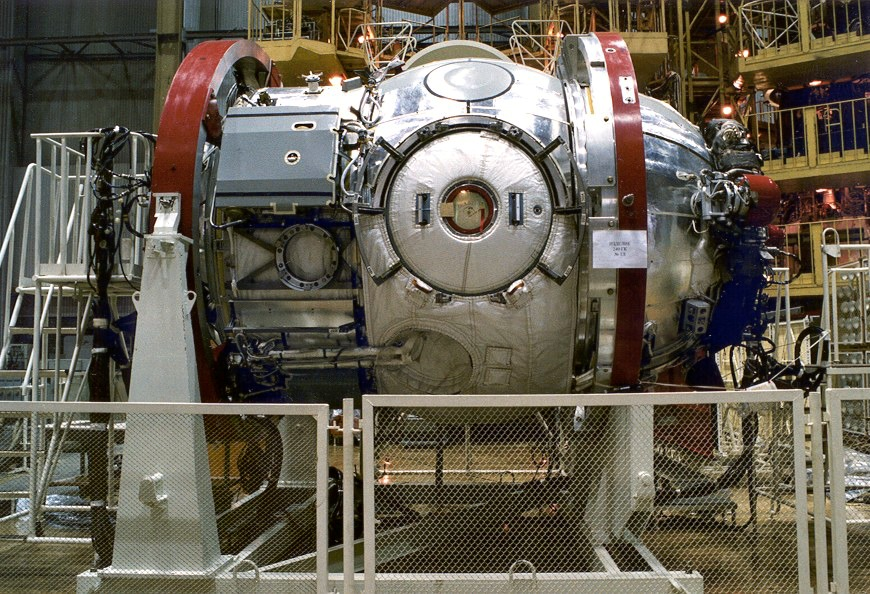
Pirs under construction at Energia in Moscow.

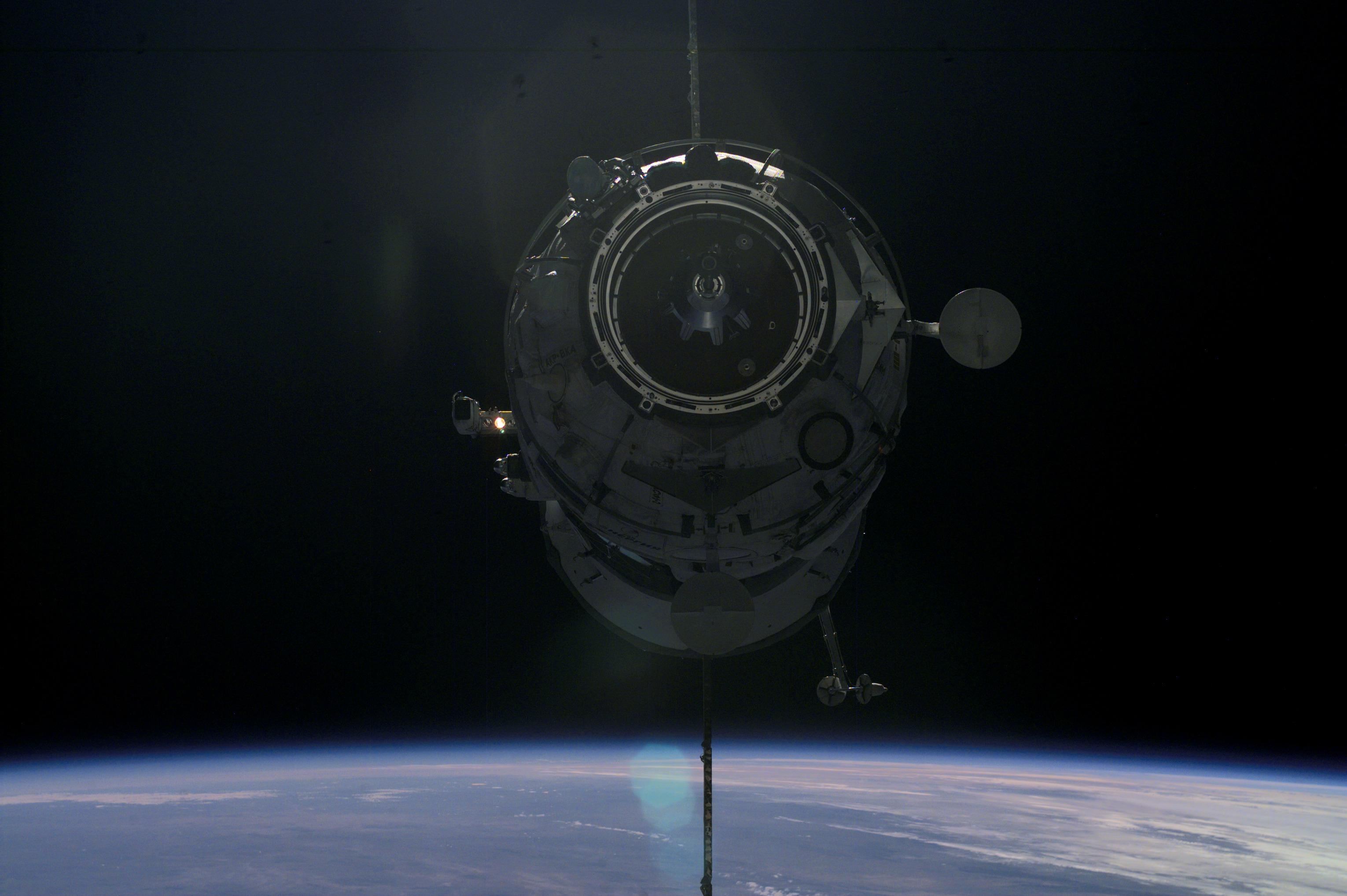
Progress DC-1 with the Pirs module seen from the International Space Station during docking.

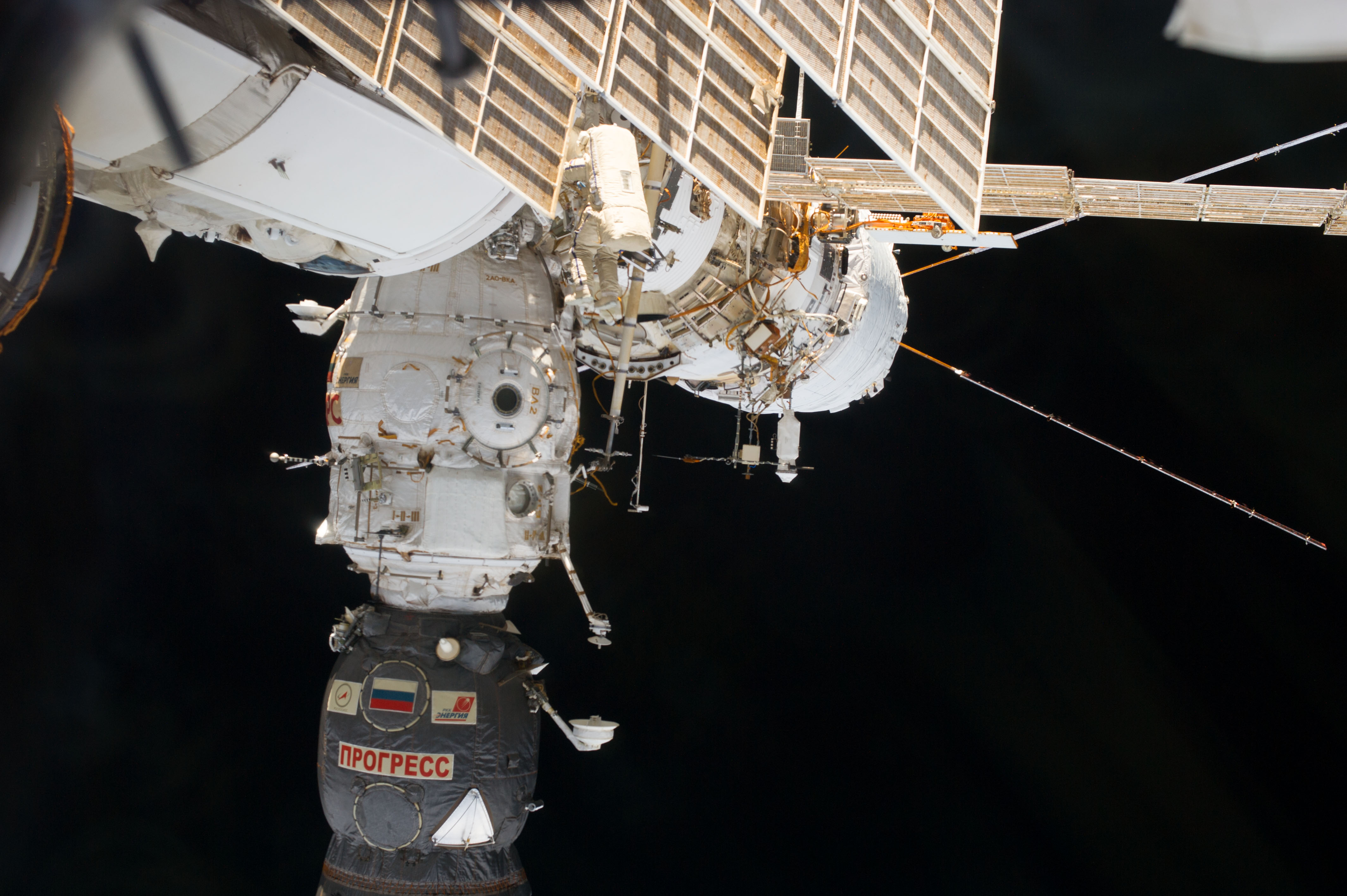
Cosmonaut Alexander Misurkin (top center), participates in a session of extravehicular activity (EVA) near Pirs module.

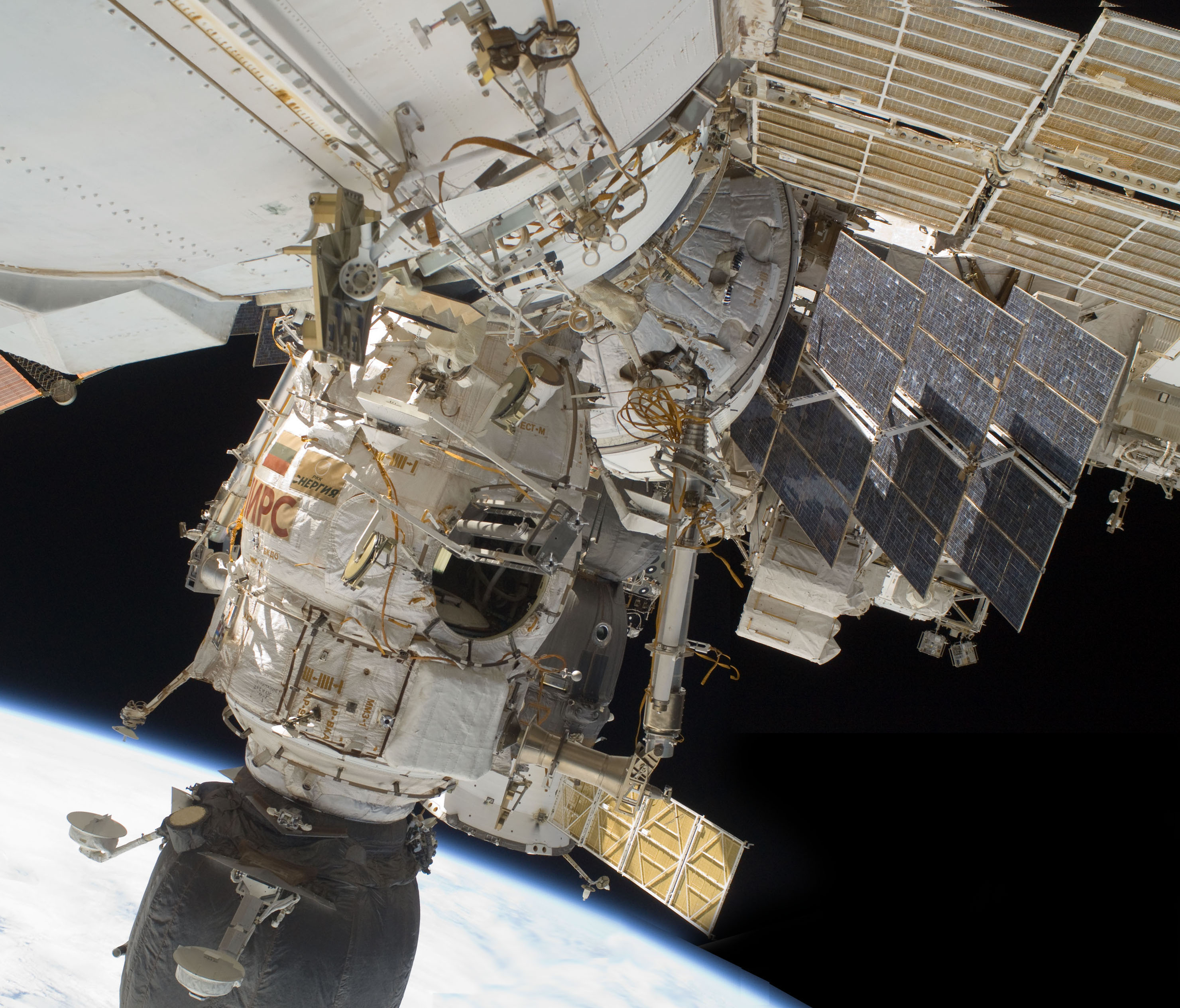
Image of the Pirs taken during a March 2009 EVA.

=== Inside ===
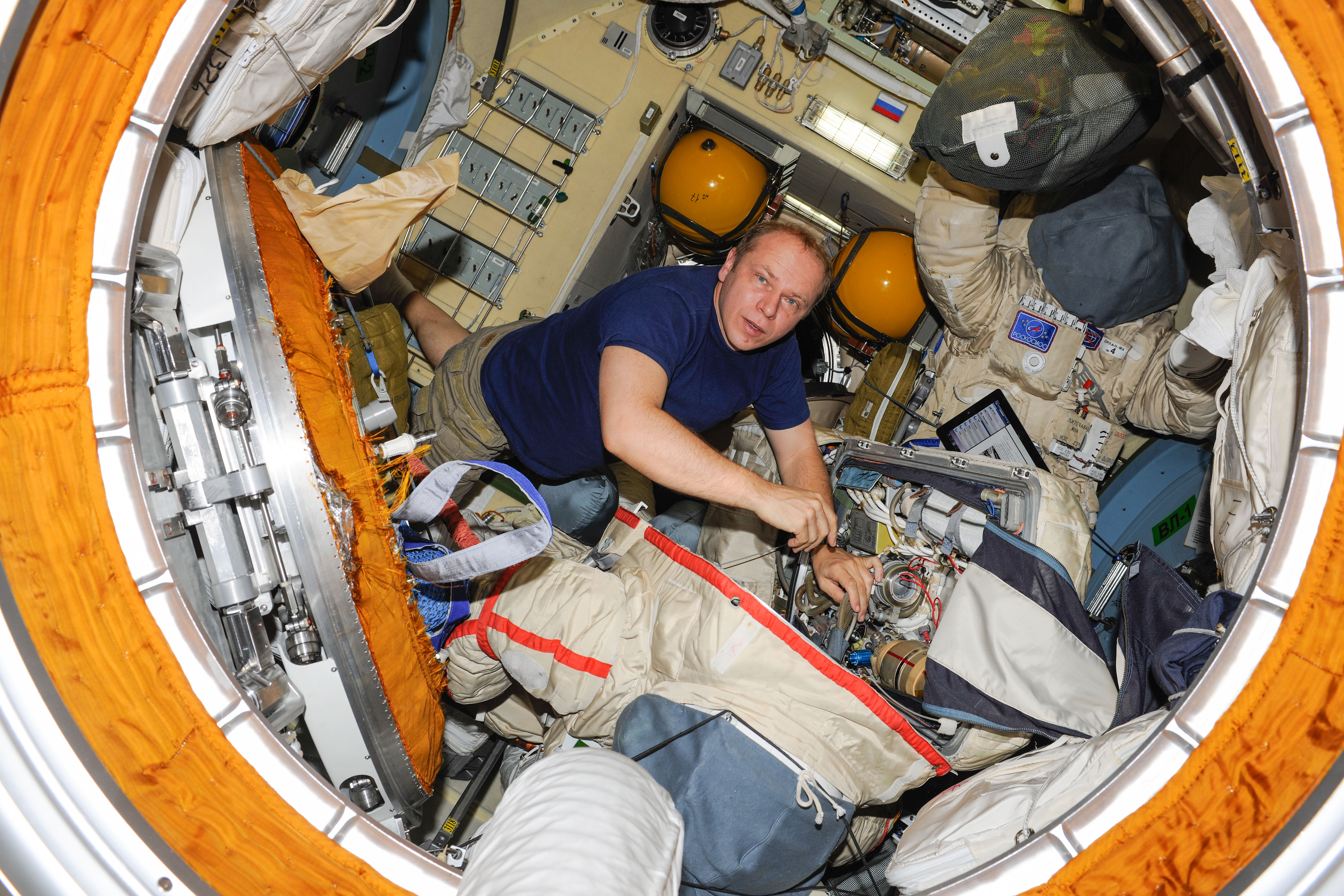
Cosmonaut Oleg Kotov works with a Russian Orlan spacesuit in the Pirs Docking Compartment.

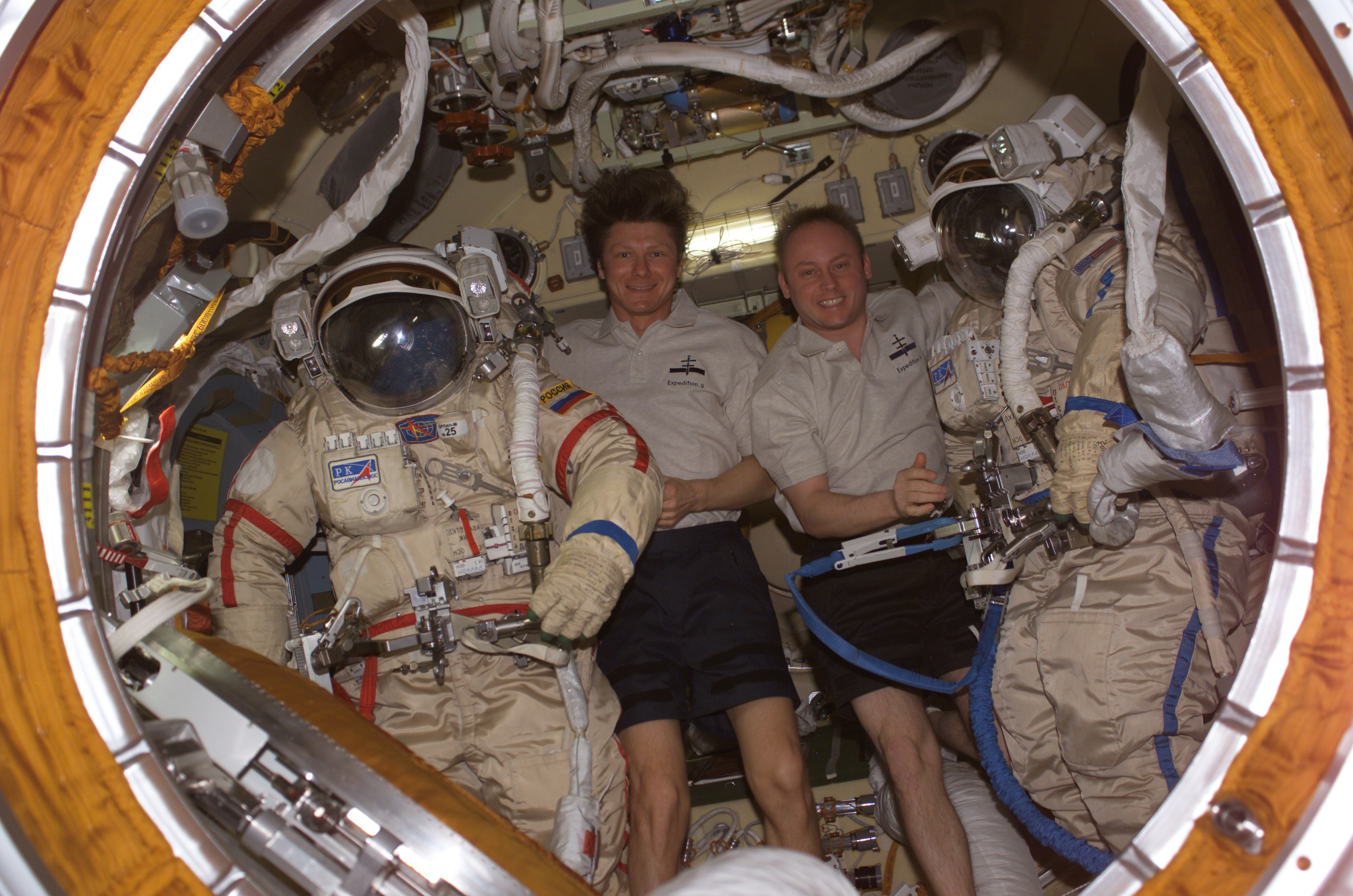
Gennady Padalka (left) and astronaut Michael Fincke pose with their Orlan spacesuits.

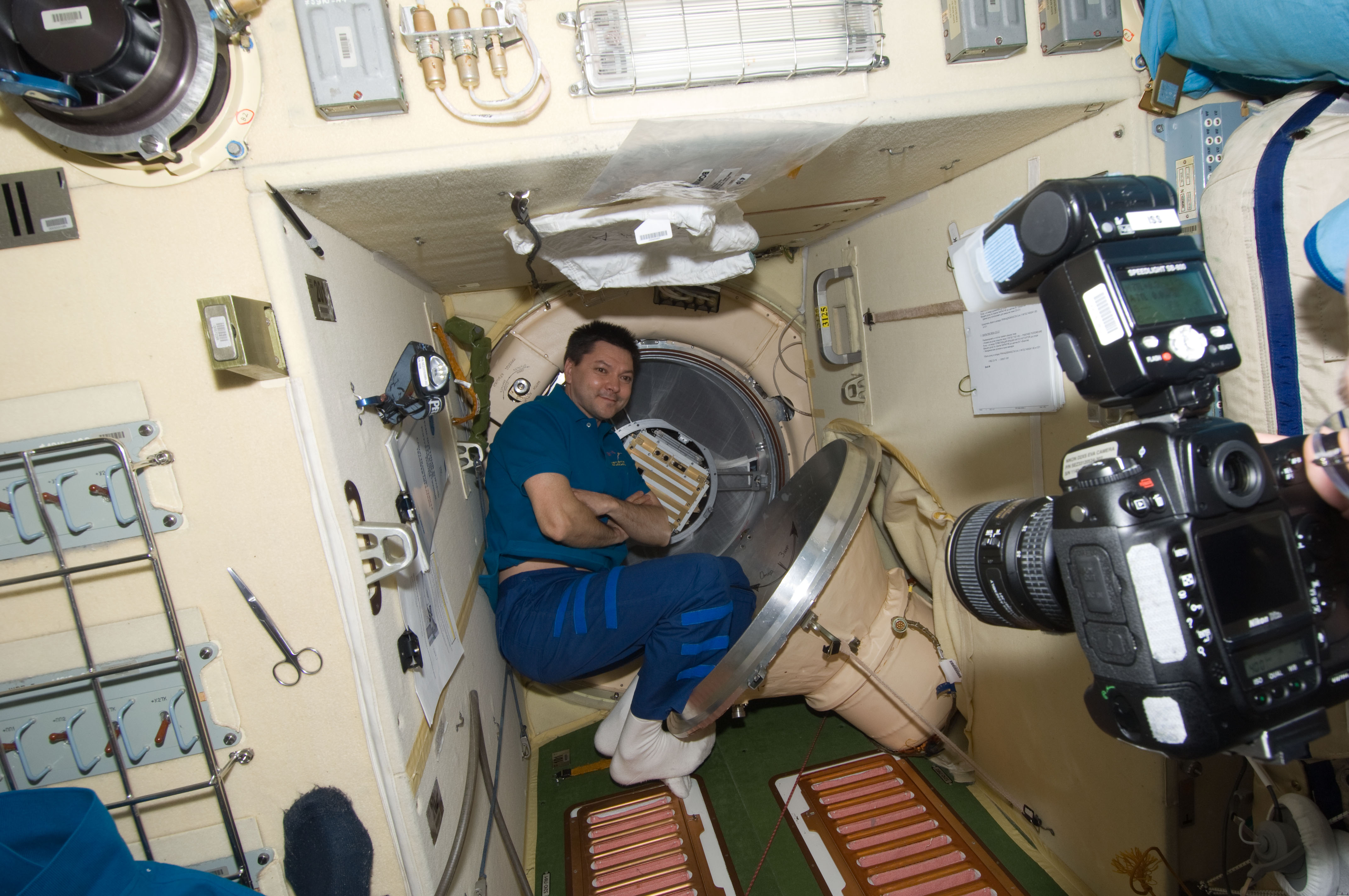
Oleg Kononenko is pictured near a hatch in the Pirs Docking Compartment.

=== Undocking ===
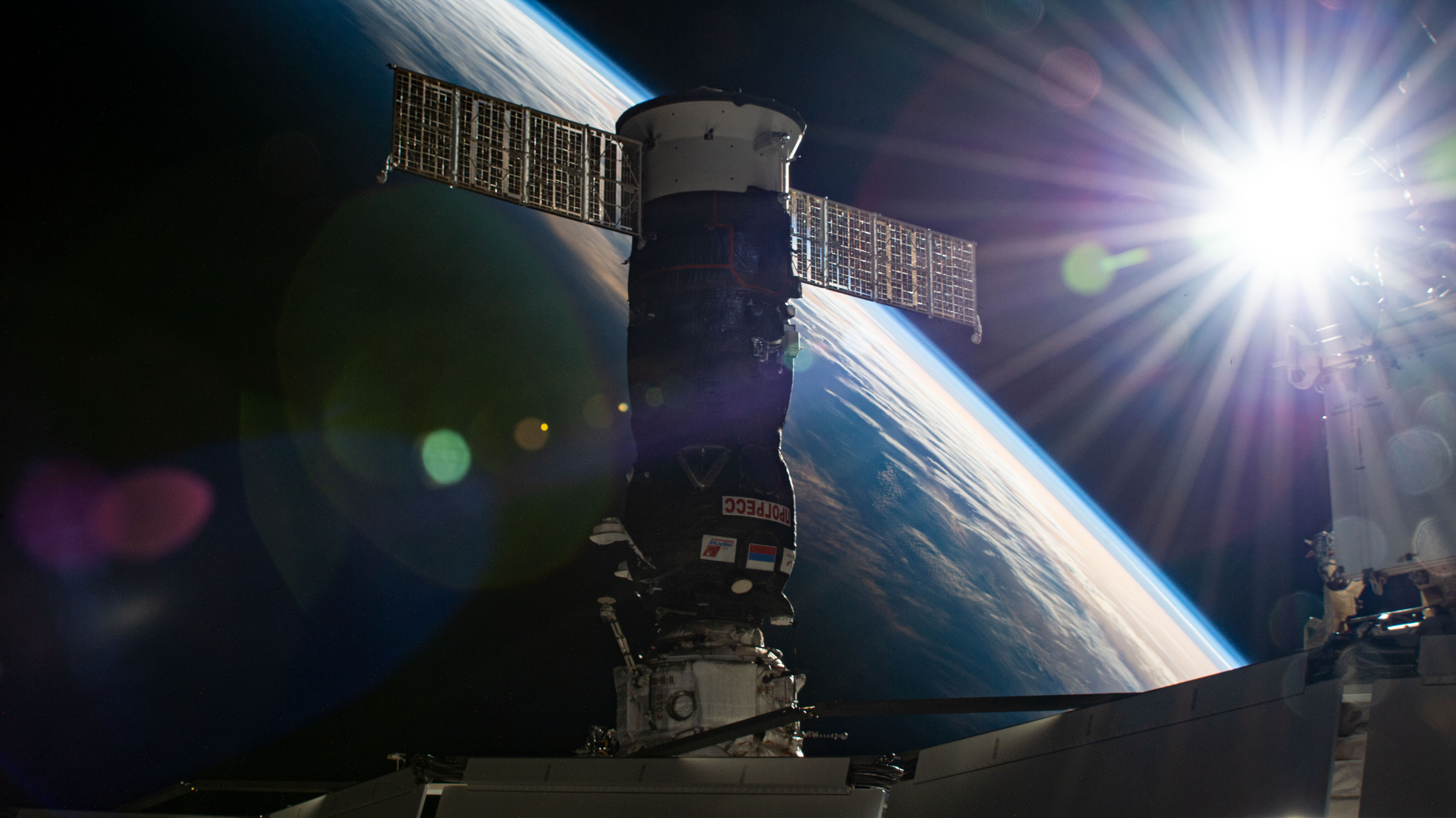
Progress MS-16 docked to the ISS. The one who undocked Pirs.

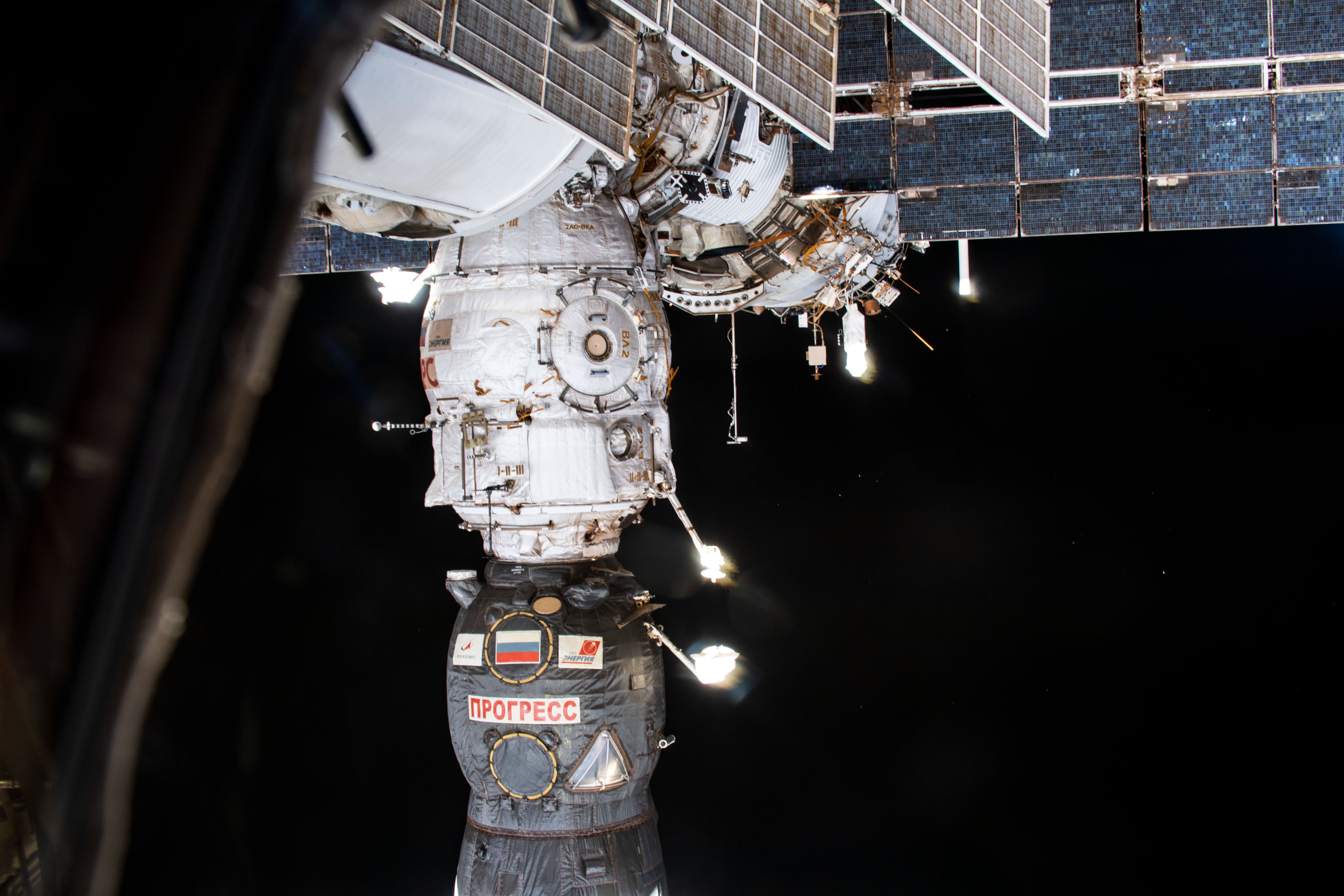
Progress MS-16 docked to the ISS before the removal of Pirs

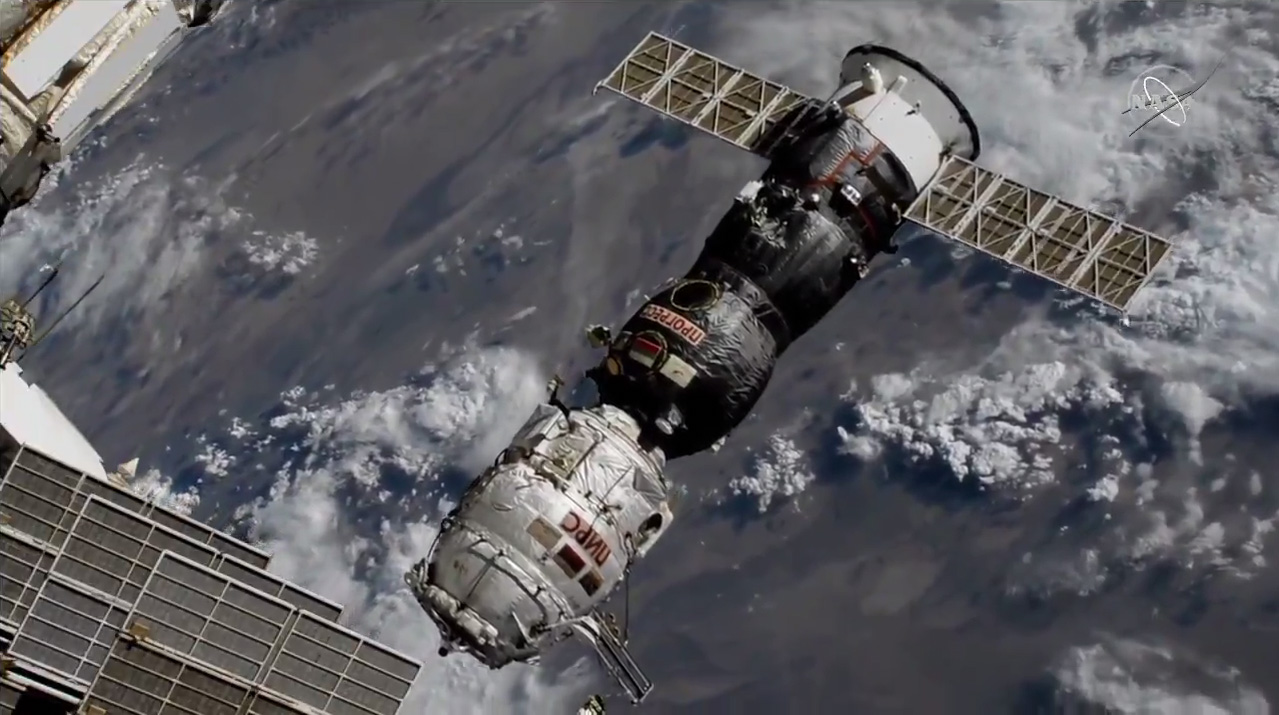
ISS-65 Pirs docking compartment separates from the Space Station

ISS-65 Pirs docking compartment separates from the Space Station

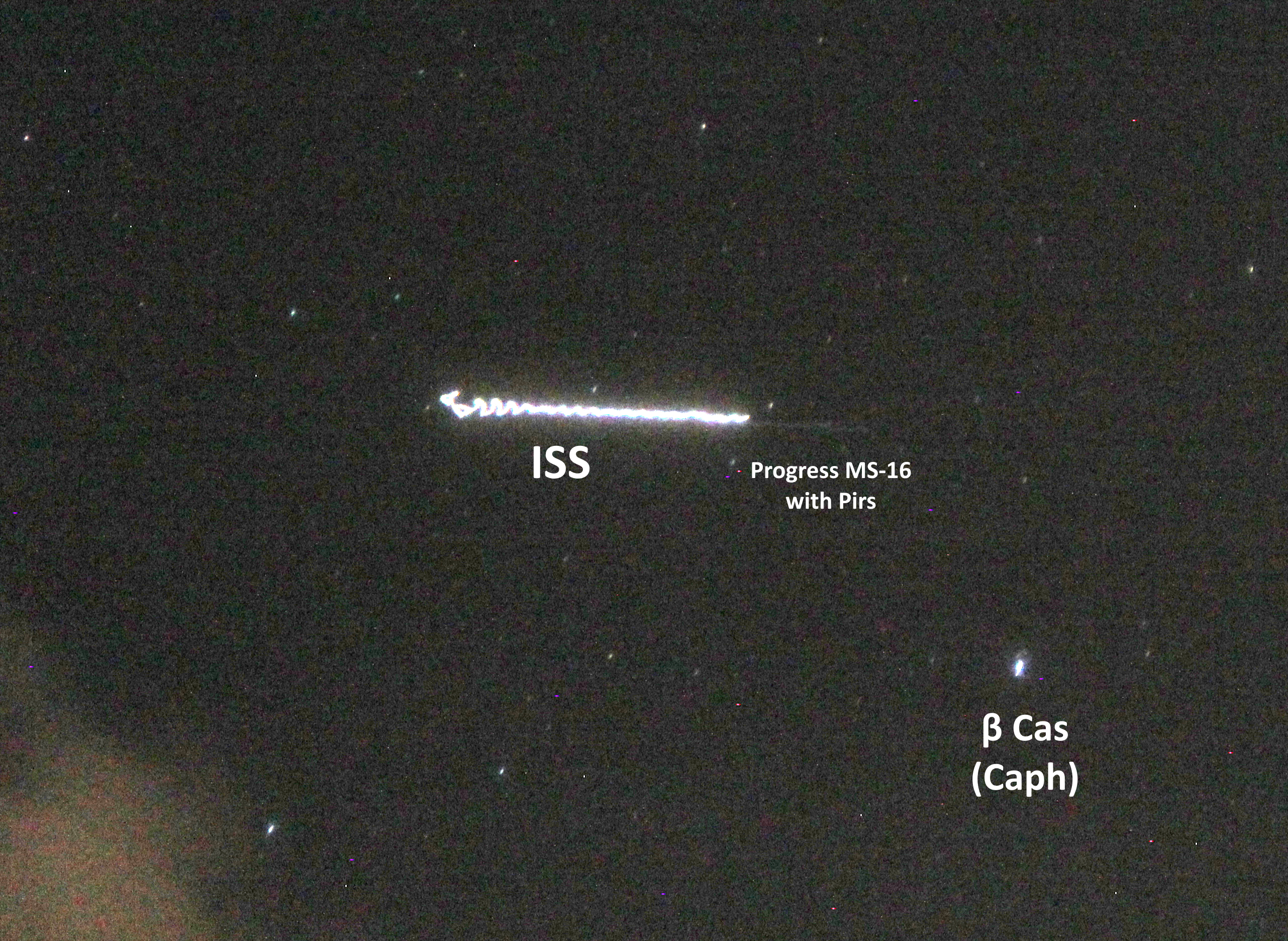
Tracks of the ISS and Progress MS-16 with the Pirs module on July 26, 2021, after undocking
