= Progress M-22M =

Russian cargo spacecraft

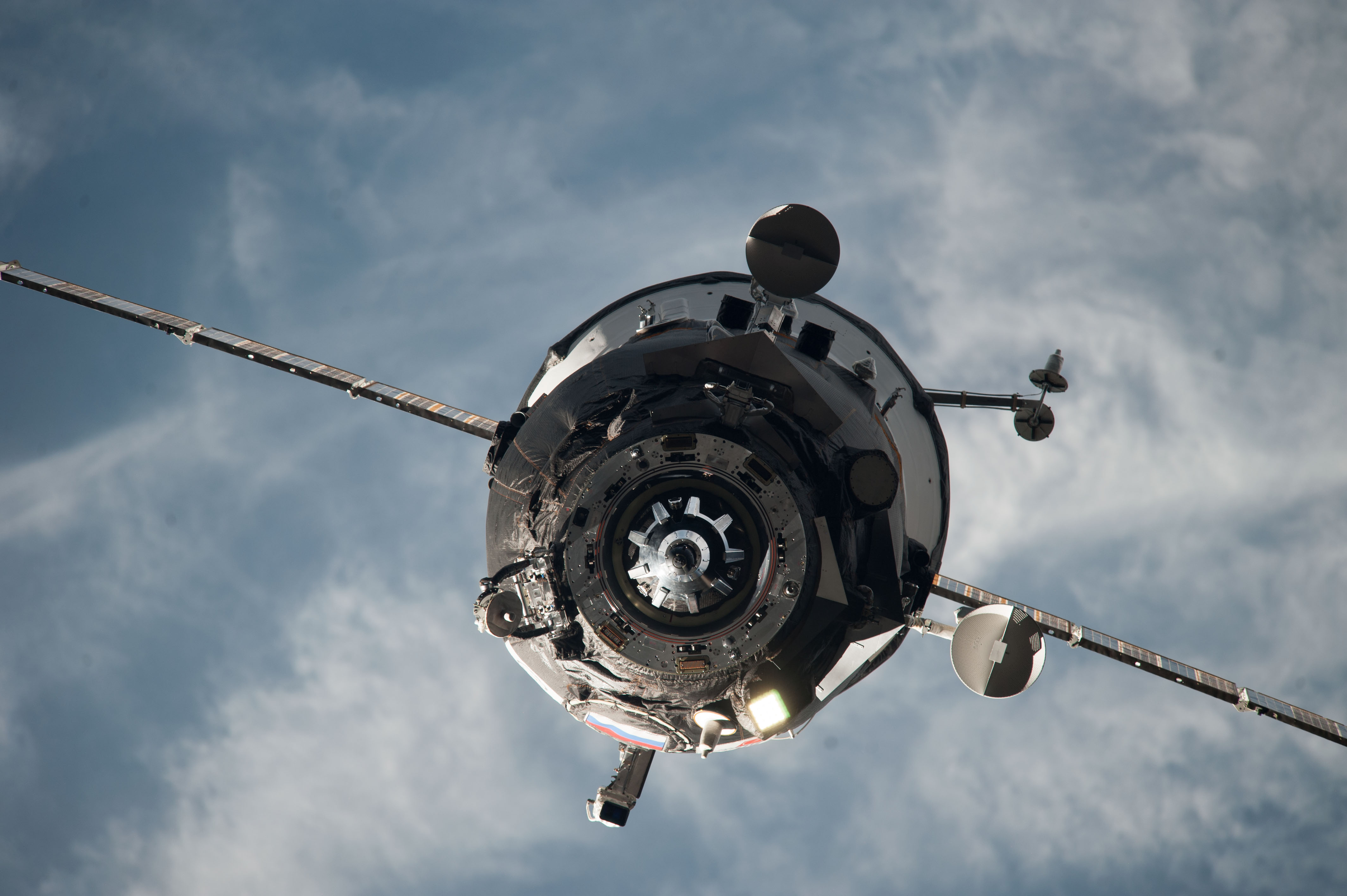
- Progress M-22M approaches the ISS on 5 February 2014
- Mission type: ISS resupply
- Operator: Roskosmos
- COSPAR ID: 2014-005A
- SATCAT no.: 39506
- Mission duration: 72 days

Spacecraft properties
- Spacecraft type: Progress-M s/n 422
- Manufacturer: RKK Energia
- Launch mass: 7,250 kg

Start of mission
- Launch date: 5 February 2014, 16:23:32 UTC
- Rocket: Soyuz-U
- Launch site: Baikonur, Site 1/5

End of mission
- Disposal: Deorbited
- Decay date: 18 April 2014, 15:46 UTC

Orbital parameters
- Reference system: Geocentric
- Regime: Low Earth
- Perigee altitude: 193 km
- Apogee altitude: 245 km
- Inclination: 51.6°
- Period: 88.59 minutes
- Epoch: 5 February 2014

Docking with ISS
- Docking port: Pirs
- Docking date: 5 February 2014, 22:22 UTC
- Undocking date: 7 April 2014, 13:58 UTC
- Time docked: 61 days

Cargo
- Mass: 2,370 kg
- Pressurised: 1,244 kg (dry cargo)
- Fuel: 656 kg
- Gaseous: 50 kg
- Water: 420 kg
- Progress ISS Resupply

Progress M-22M (Russian: Прогресс М-22М), identified by NASA as Progress 54P, is a Progress spacecraft used by Roskosmos to resupply the International Space Station (ISS) during 2014. Progress M-22M was built by RKK Energia. Progress M-22M was launched on a six-hour rendezvous profile towards the ISS. The 22nd Progress-M 11F615A60 spacecraft to be launched, it had the serial number 422.

== Launch ==
The spacecraft was launched on 5 February 2014 at 16:23:32 UTC from the Baikonur Cosmodrome in Kazakhstan. The launch was the first Russian orbital launch of 2014.

== Docking ==
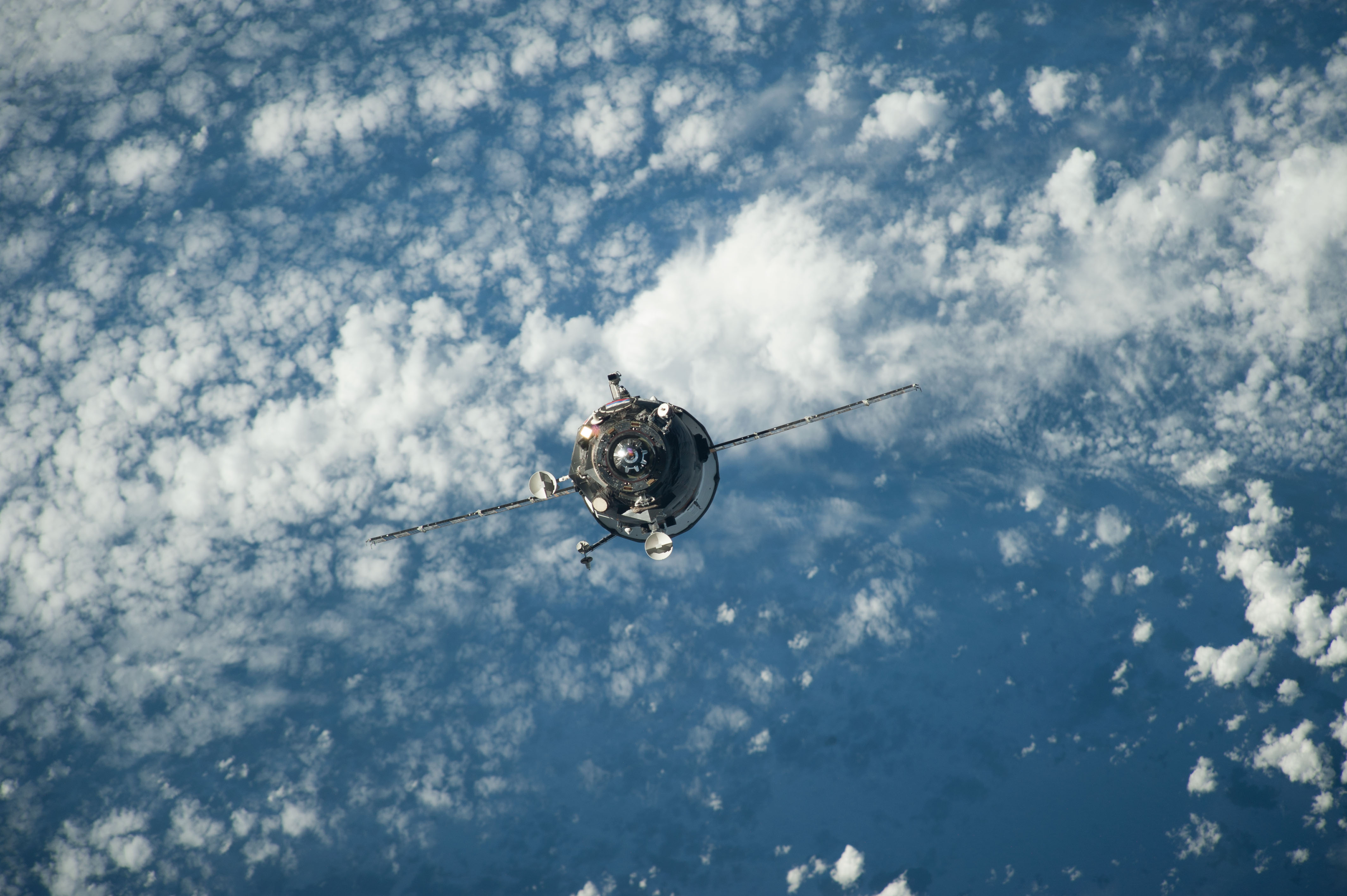
An ISS Progress resupply vehicle approaches the International Space Station, carrying food, fuel and supplies for the Expedition 38 crew members. The spacecraft completed its four-orbit trek when it docked automatically to the station's Pirs docking compartment.

Progress M-22M docked with the Pirs docking compartment on 5 February at 22:22 UTC, less than six hours after launch.

== Cargo ==
The Progress spacecraft carries 2,370 kg of cargo and supplies to the International Space Station.

== Undocking and Reentry ==
Progress M-22M undocked from the ISS on 7 April 2014, and was deorbited on 18 April 2014 after supporting a scientific experiment in free-fly mode.
