= Progress DC-1 =

Modified Progress spacecraft used to deliver the Pirs module to the ISS

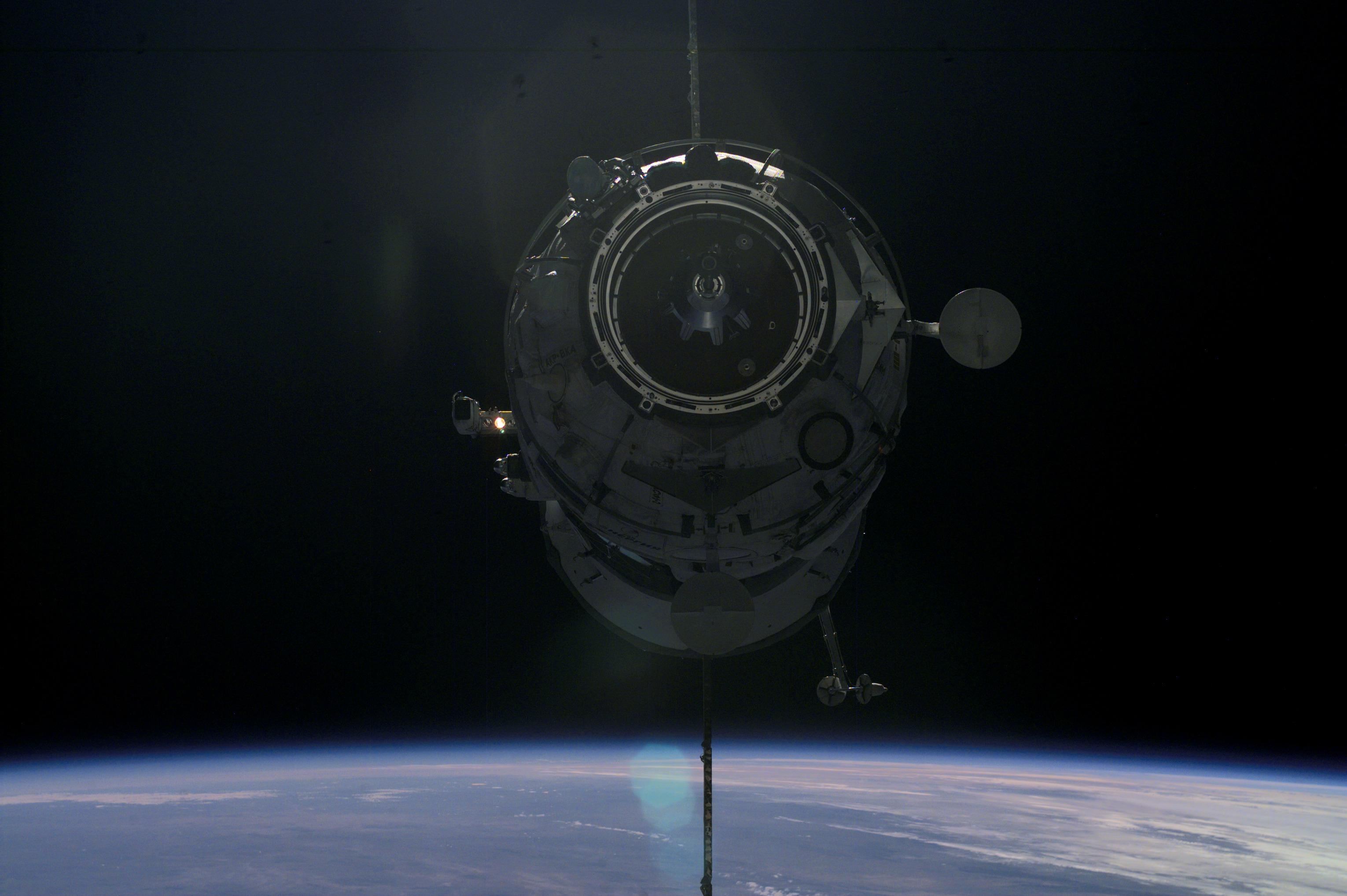
- Progress DC-1 approaching the ISS with Pirs.
- Mission type: ISS assembly
- Operator: Roscosmos
- COSPAR ID: 2001-041A
- SATCAT no.: 26908
- Mission duration: 13 days

Spacecraft properties
- Spacecraft type: Progress-M (modified) s/n 301
- Manufacturer: RKK Energia
- Launch mass: 6900 kg

Start of mission
- Launch date: 14 September 2001, 23:34:55 UTC
- Rocket: Soyuz-U
- Launch site: Baikonur, Site 1/5

End of mission
- Disposal: Deorbited
- Decay date: 27 September 2001, 00:01 UTC

Orbital parameters
- Reference system: Geocentric
- Regime: Low Earth
- Perigee altitude: 388.2 km
- Apogee altitude: 393.6 km
- Inclination: 51.6°
- Period: 92.3 minutes
- Epoch: 14 September 2001

Docking with ISS
- Docking port: Zvezda nadir (Pirs)
- Docking date: 17 September 2001, 01:05 UTC
- Undocking date: 26 September 2001, 15:36 UTC
- Time docked: 9 days

Payload
- Pirs
- Mass: 3580 kg
- Progress ISS assembly

Progress DC-1 (Originally designated Progress SO1) was a modified Progress 11F615A55, Russian production No. 301, used to deliver the Pirs module to the International Space Station. It has the pressurised cargo module removed to accommodate Pirs.

== Launch ==
Progress DC-1 was launched by a Soyuz-U carrier rocket from Site 1/5 at the Baikonur Cosmodrome. Launch occurred at 23:34:55 UTC on 14 September 2001.

== Docking ==
The spacecraft docked with the nadir port of the Zvezda module at 01:05 UTC on 17 September 2001. It remained docked for nine days.

== Undocking and Decay ==
On 26 September 2001 at 15:36 UTC it was jettisoned from Pirs. It was deorbited at 23:30 UTC on the same day, and burned up in the atmosphere over the Pacific Ocean, with any remaining debris landing in the ocean at around 00:01 UTC on 27 September 2001.

== See also ==
- List of Progress flights
- Uncrewed spaceflights to the International Space Station
- Progress M-MIM2
- Progress M-UM
