= Progress M-62 =

Russian cargo spacecraft

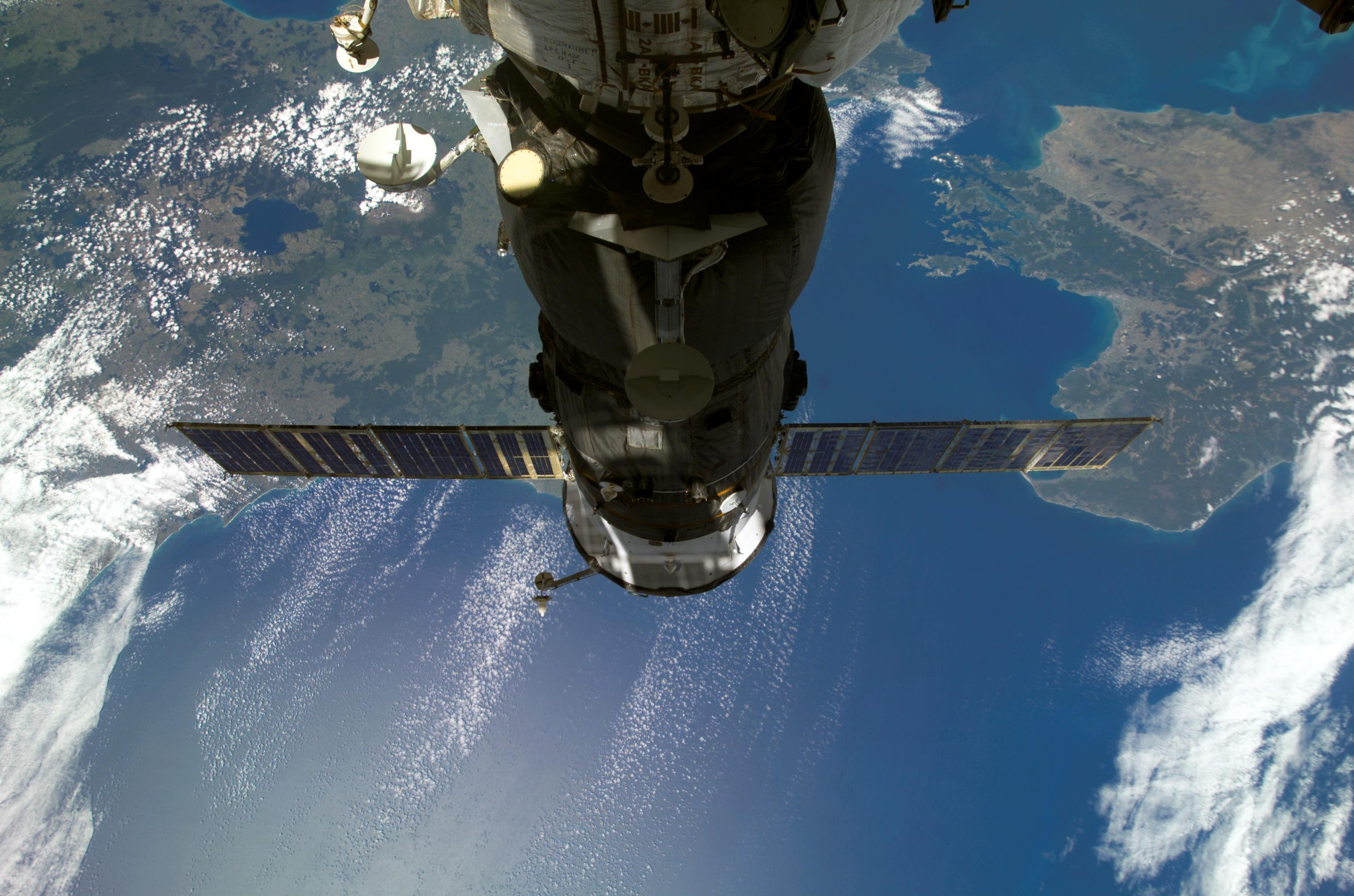
- Progress M-62 docked with the ISS.
- Mission type: ISS resupply
- Operator: Roskosmos
- COSPAR ID: 2007-064A
- SATCAT no.: 32391
- Mission duration: 54 days

Spacecraft properties
- Spacecraft type: Progress-M s/n 362
- Manufacturer: RKK Energia

Start of mission
- Launch date: 23 December 2007, 07:12:41 UTC
- Rocket: Soyuz-U
- Launch site: Baikonur, Site 1/5

End of mission
- Disposal: Deorbited
- Decay date: 15 February 2008, 13:29 UTC

Orbital parameters
- Reference system: Geocentric
- Regime: Low Earth
- Inclination: 51.6°
- Epoch: 23 December 2007

Docking with ISS
- Docking port: Pirs
- Docking date: 26 December 2007, 08:14 UTC
- Undocking date: 4 February 2008, 10:32 UTC
- Time docked: 40 days

Cargo
- Mass: 2500 kg
- Pressurised: 1325 kg (dry cargo)
- Fuel: 862 kg
- Gaseous: 46 kg (oxygen)
- Progress ISS Resupply

Progress M-62 (Russian: Прогресс М-62), identified by NASA as Progress 27P, was a Progress spacecraft used to resupply the International Space Station. It was a Progress-M 11F615A55 spacecraft, with the serial number 362.

== Launch ==
Progress M-62 was launched by a Soyuz-U carrier rocket from Site 1/5 at the Baikonur Cosmodrome. Launch occurred at 07:12:41 UTC on 23 December 2007.

== Docking ==
The spacecraft docked with the Pirs module at 08:14 UTC on 26 December 2007. The Pirs module had previously been occupied by Progress M-61, which undocked on 22 December 2007. Progress M-62 remained docked for 40 days before undocking at 10:32 UTC on 4 February 2008. Following undocking it conducted Earth observation experiments for eleven days prior to being deorbited. It was deorbited at 09:44 UTC on 15 February 2008. The spacecraft burned up in the atmosphere over the Pacific Ocean, with any remaining debris landing in the ocean at around 13:29 UTC.

Progress M-62 carried supplies to the International Space Station, including food, water and oxygen for the crew and equipment for conducting scientific research. It carried over 862 kilograms (1,900 lb) of propellant, 46 kilograms (101 lb) of oxygen and 1,325 kilograms (2,921 lb) of dry cargo. The total mass of the cargo carried was 2,500 kilograms (5,500 lb).

== See also ==
- List of Progress flights
- Uncrewed spaceflights to the International Space Station
