= Progress M-16M =

Russian spacecraft

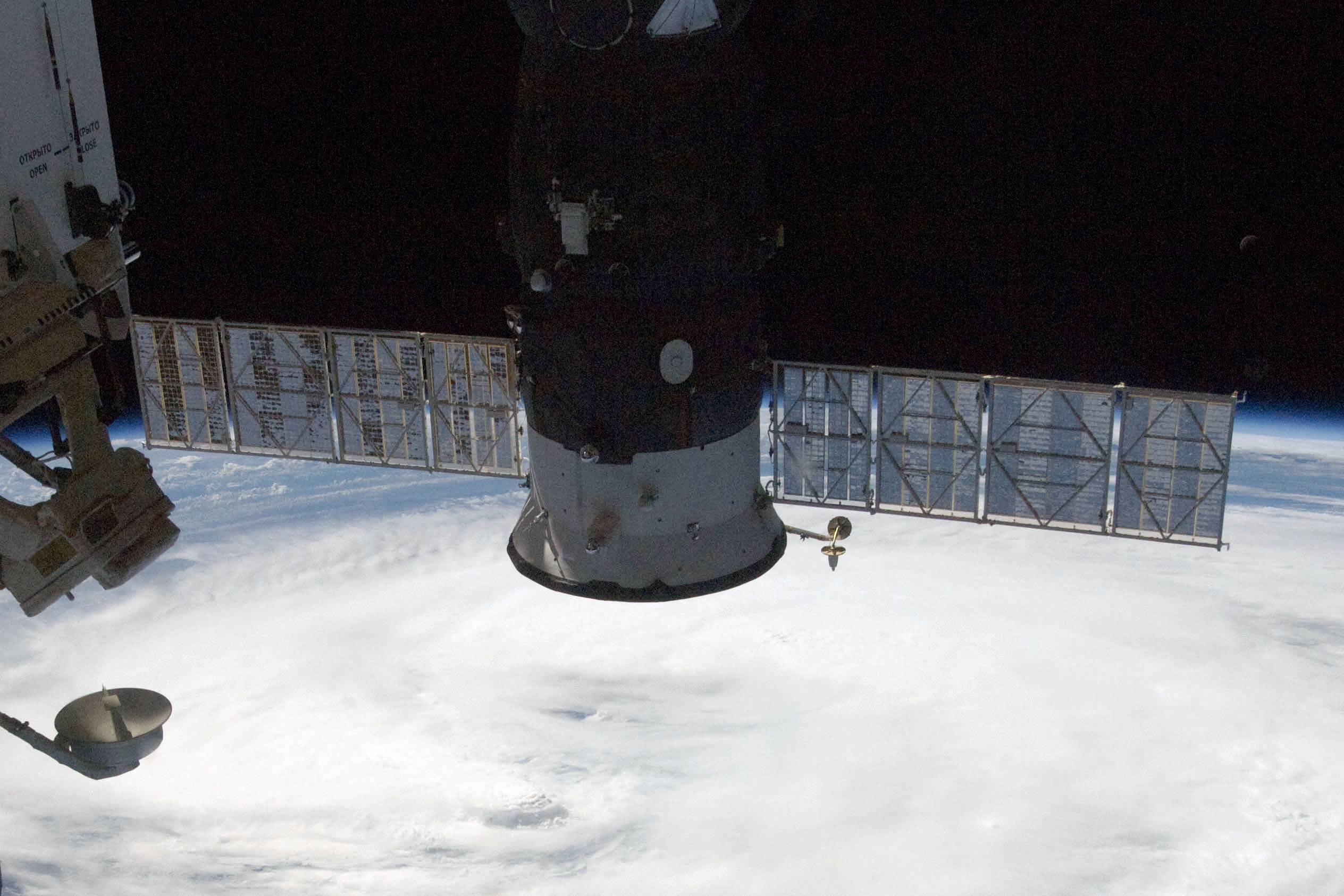
- Progress M-16M atop Hurricane Leslie, on 9 September 2012.
- Mission type: ISS resupply
- Operator: Roskosmos
- COSPAR ID: 2012-042A
- SATCAT no.: 38738
- Mission duration: 192 days

Spacecraft properties
- Spacecraft type: Progress-M s/n 416
- Manufacturer: RKK Energia
- Launch mass: 6950 kg

Start of mission
- Launch date: 1 August 2012, 19:35:13 UTC
- Rocket: Soyuz-U
- Launch site: Baikonur, Site 1/5

End of mission
- Disposal: Deorbited
- Decay date: 9 February 2013, 17:05 UTC

Orbital parameters
- Reference system: Geocentric
- Regime: Low Earth
- Perigee altitude: 193.0 km
- Apogee altitude: 245.0 km
- Inclination: 51.66°
- Period: 88.58 minutes
- Epoch: 1 August 2012

Docking with ISS
- Docking port: Pirs
- Docking date: 2 August 2012, 01:24:39 UTC
- Undocking date: 9 February 2013, 13:16 UTC
- Time docked: 191 days

Cargo
- Mass: 2639 kg
- Pressurised: 1242 kg (dry cargo)
- Fuel: 680 kg
- Gaseous: 47 kg (oxygen and air)
- Water: 420 kg
- Progress ISS Resupply

Progress M-16M (Russian: Прогресс М-16М), identified by NASA as Progress 48P, is a Progress spacecraft used by Roskosmos to resupply the International Space Station during 2012. The sixteenth Progress-M 11F615A60 spacecraft, it has the serial number 416 and was built by RKK Energia.

It was the 126th launch to the ISS and the fifteenth Russian space launch in 2012. It was also the seventh mission for the Soyuz family of rockets since the beginning of the year.

== Launch ==
The spacecraft was launched on time at 19:35:13 UTC from the Baikonur Cosmodrome in Kazakhstan, on 1 August 2012. Ten minutes after liftoff, the Soyuz-U rocket carrying Progress M-16M successfully delivered the spacecraft to orbit to begin its International Space Station (ISS) resupply mission.

== Docking ==
Progress M-16M debuted the use of a fast approach rendezvous profile that saw the spacecraft docking on its fourth orbit, as opposed to docking about 50 hours after launch on previous Progress flights. This profile allows the transportation of critical biological payloads to the ISS. After testing on Progress flights, the same rendezvous profile is being used on human Soyuz flights to reduce crew fatigue.

== Hurricane Leslie (2012) ==
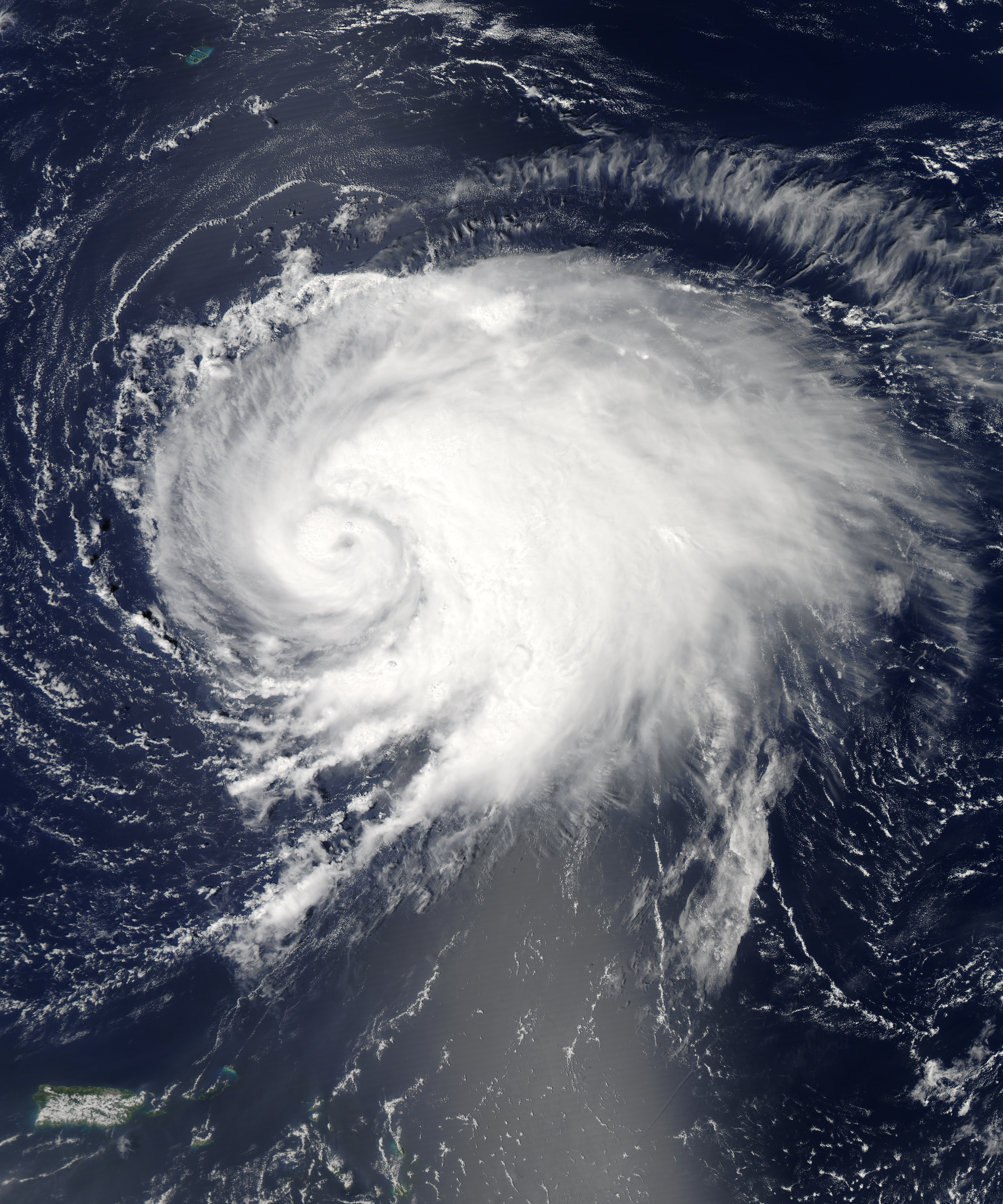
A photo of Hurricane Leslie, 5 September 2012, by the Aqua satellite.

Partially obstructed by two Russian spacecraft in the foreground, Tropical cyclone Leslie is clearly seen in the Atlantic Ocean on 9 September 2012, as photographed by one of the Expedition 32 crew members aboard the International Space Station. At the time of the photo, Leslie was centered near 33.4° North latitude and 62.1° West longitude (approximately 300 km east-northeast of Bermuda) moving northward at 25 km per hour with winds of 100 km per hour.

== Undocking and decay ==
Progress M-16M departed the Pirs Docking Compartment at 13:15:27 UTC on 9 February 2013 performing a nominal undocking to begin a very short free flight.

== Cargo ==
Progress M-16M was packed with 1242 kilograms of equipment, food, clothing, life support system gear (dry cargo), 680 kilograms of propellant to replenish reservoirs that feed the Russian maneuvering thrusters, 420 kilograms of water and 47 kilograms of oxygen and air.
