= Progress M-23M =

Russian cargo spacecraft

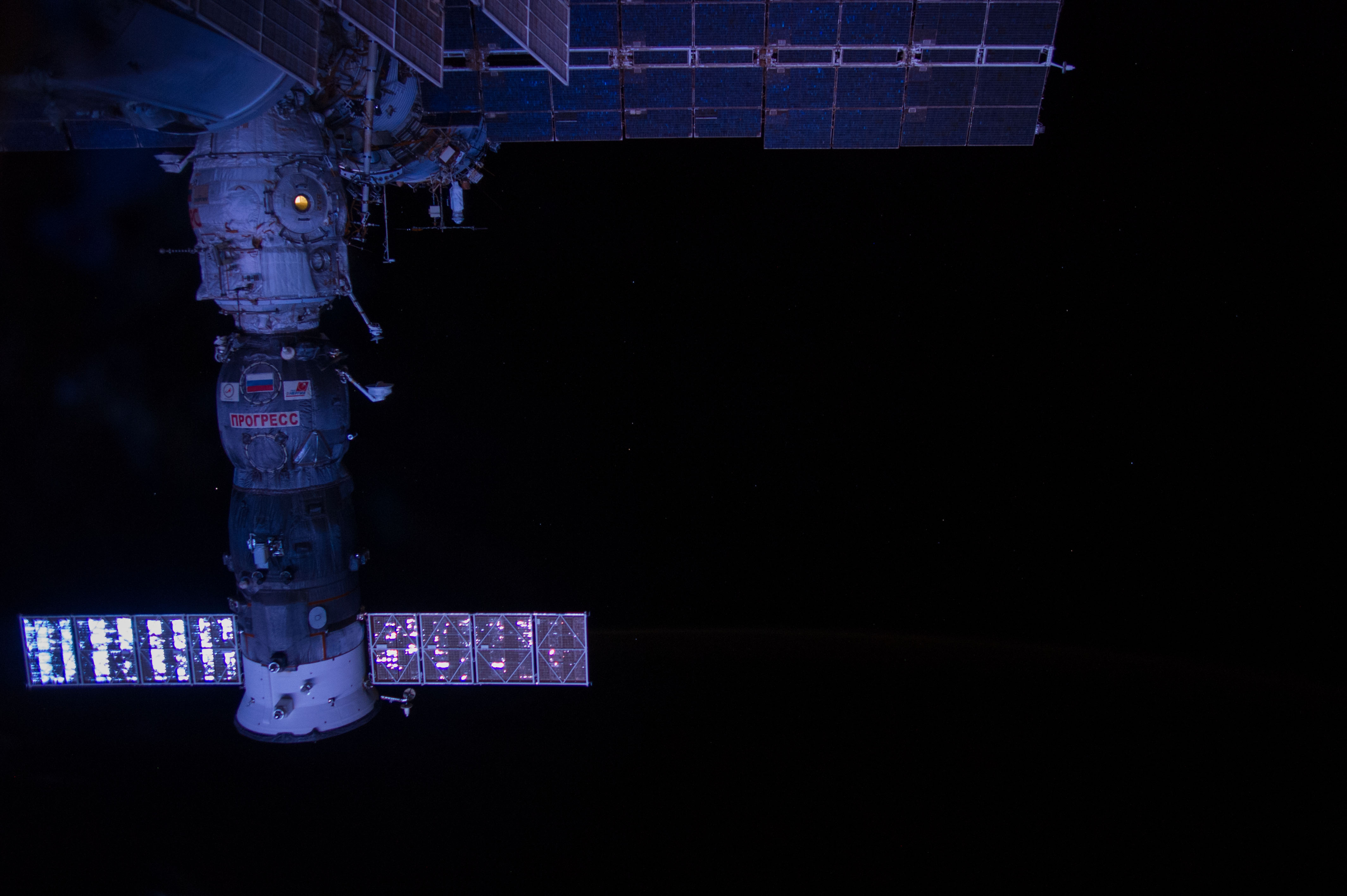
- Night time view of Progress M-23M docked at the ISS.
- Mission type: ISS resupply
- Operator: Roskosmos
- COSPAR ID: 2014-018A
- SATCAT no.: 39648
- Mission duration: 113 days

Spacecraft properties
- Spacecraft type: Progress-M s/n 427
- Manufacturer: RKK Energia
- Launch mass: 7280 kg

Start of mission
- Launch date: 9 April 2014, 15:26:27 UTC
- Rocket: Soyuz-U
- Launch site: Baikonur, Site 1/5

End of mission
- Disposal: Deorbited
- Decay date: 31 July 2014, 22:42 UTC

Orbital parameters
- Reference system: Geocentric
- Regime: Low Earth
- Perigee altitude: 193 km
- Apogee altitude: 245 km
- Inclination: 51.66°
- Period: 88.59 minutes
- Epoch: 9 April 2014

Docking with ISS
- Docking port: Pirs
- Docking date: 9 April 2014, 21:14 UTC
- Undocking date: 21 July 2014, 21:44 UTC
- Time docked: 103 days

Cargo
- Mass: 2383 kg
- Pressurised: 1215 kg (dry cargo)
- Fuel: 880 kg
- Gaseous: 48 kg
- Water: 420 kg
- Progress ISS Resupply

Progress M-23M (Russian: Прогресс М-23М), identified by NASA as Progress 55P, is a Progress spacecraft used by Roskosmos to resupply the International Space Station (ISS) during 2014. Progress M-23M was launched on a six-hours rendezvous profile towards the ISS. The 23rd Progress-M 11F615A60 spacecraft to be launched, it had the serial number 427 and was built by RKK Energia.

== Launch ==
The spacecraft was launched on 9 April 2014 at 15:26:27 UTC from the Baikonur Cosmodrome in Kazakhstan.

== Docking ==
Progress M-23M docked with the Pirs docking compartment on 9 April 2014 at 21:14 UTC, less than six hours after launch.

== Cargo ==
The Progress spacecraft carries 2383 kg of cargo and supplies to the International Space Station.

== Undocking and Reentry ==
Progress M-23M undocked from the ISS on 21 July 2014, and was deorbited on 31 July after participating in the Radar-Progress experiment.
