= Progress M-61 =

Russian cargo spacecraft

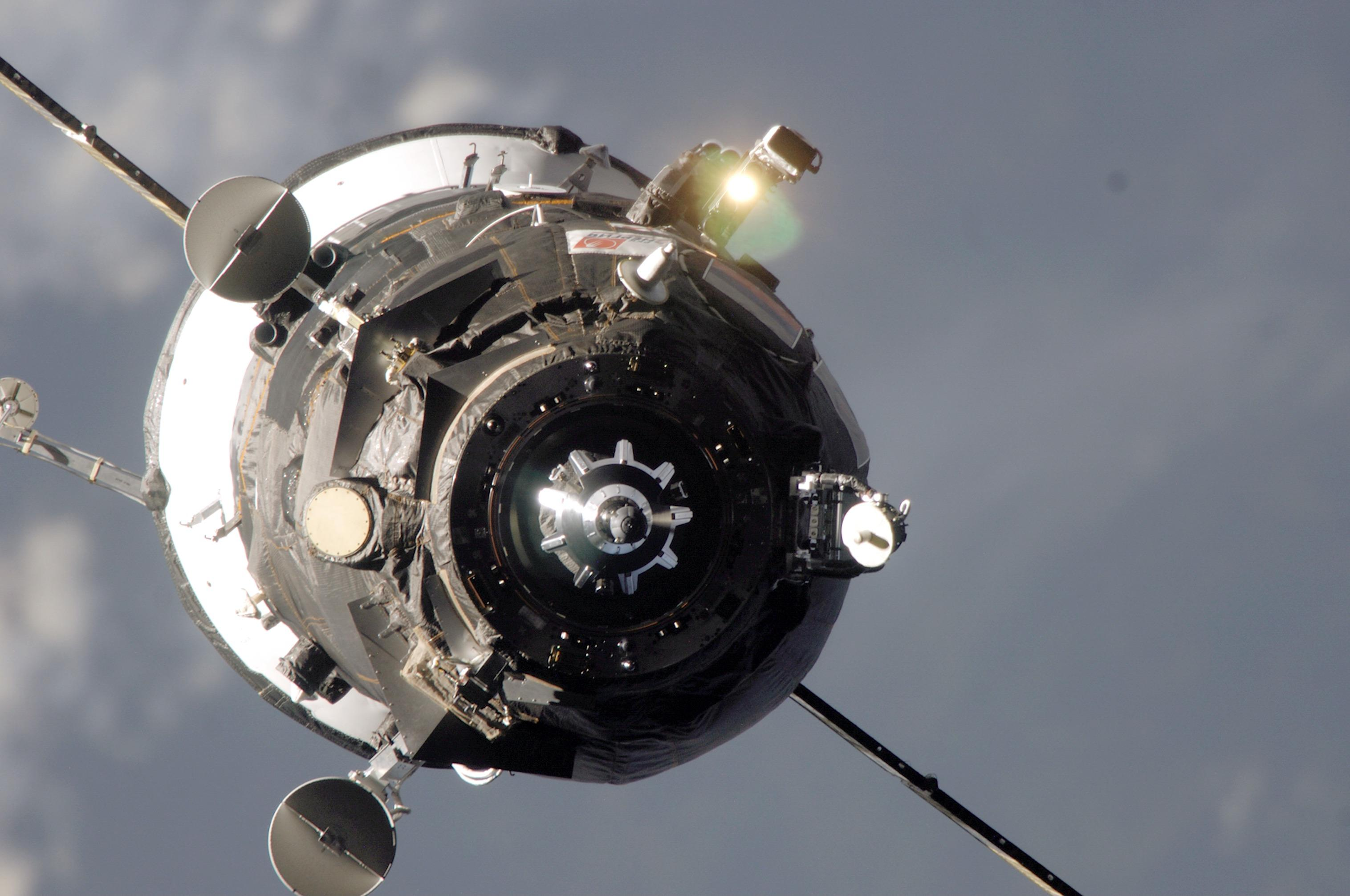
- Progress M-61 approaching the ISS.
- Mission type: ISS resupply
- Operator: Roskosmos
- COSPAR ID: 2007-033A
- SATCAT no.: 32001
- Mission duration: 173 days

Spacecraft properties
- Spacecraft type: Progress-M s/n 361
- Manufacturer: RKK Energia

Start of mission
- Launch date: 2 August 2007, 17:33:47 UTC
- Rocket: Soyuz-U
- Launch site: Baikonur, Site 1/5

End of mission
- Disposal: Deorbited
- Decay date: 22 January 2008, 19:51 UTC

Orbital parameters
- Reference system: Geocentric
- Regime: Low Earth
- Perigee altitude: 336 km
- Apogee altitude: 347 km
- Inclination: 51.6°
- Period: 91.4 minutes
- Epoch: 2 August 2007

Docking with ISS
- Docking port: Pirs
- Docking date: 5 August 2007, 18:40 UTC
- Undocking date: 22 December 2007, 03:59 UTC
- Time docked: 139 days

Cargo
- Mass: 2300 kg
- Progress ISS Resupply

Progress M-61 (Russian: Прогресс М-61), identified by NASA as Progress 26P, was a Progress spacecraft used to resupply the International Space Station. It was a Progress-M 11F615A55 spacecraft, with the serial number 361.

== Launch ==
Progress M-61 was launched by a Soyuz-U carrier rocket from Site 1/5 at the Baikonur Cosmodrome. Launch occurred at 17:33:47 UTC on 2 August 2007.

== Docking ==
The spacecraft docked with the Pirs module at 18:40 UTC on 5 August 2007. It remained docked for almost 139 days before undocking at 03:59 UTC on 22 December 2007. Following undocking it conducted technological experiments and research as part of the Plazma-Progress programme for a month prior to being deorbited. It was deorbited at 19:06 UTC on 22 January 2008. The spacecraft burned up in the atmosphere over the Pacific Ocean, with any remaining debris landing in the ocean at around 19:51 UTC.

Progress M-61 carried supplies to the International Space Station, including food, water and oxygen for the crew and equipment for conducting scientific research.

== See also ==
- List of Progress flights
- Uncrewed spaceflights to the International Space Station
