= Progress M-59 =

Russian cargo spacecraft

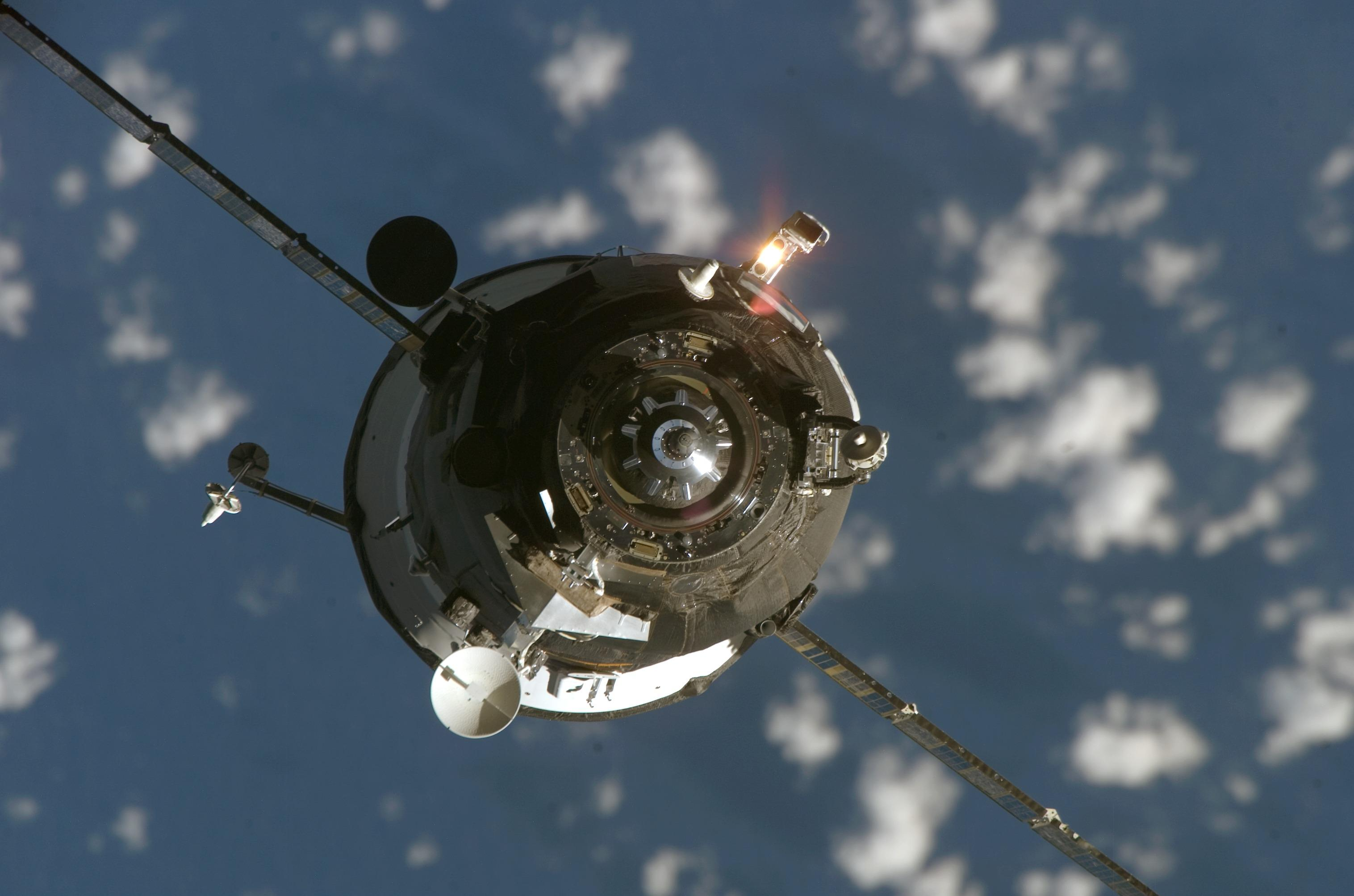
- Progress M-59 approaching the ISS.
- Mission type: ISS resupply
- Operator: Roskosmos
- COSPAR ID: 2007-002A
- SATCAT no.: 29714
- Mission duration: 195 days

Spacecraft properties
- Spacecraft type: Progress-M s/n 359
- Manufacturer: RKK Energia

Start of mission
- Launch date: 18 January 2007, 02:12:13 UTC
- Rocket: Soyuz-U
- Launch site: Baikonur, Site 1/5

End of mission
- Disposal: Deorbited
- Decay date: 1 August 2007, 19:26 UTC

Orbital parameters
- Reference system: Geocentric
- Regime: Low Earth
- Perigee altitude: 322 km
- Apogee altitude: 352 km
- Inclination: 51.6°
- Period: 91.3 minutes
- Epoch: 18 January 2007

Docking with ISS
- Docking port: Pirs
- Docking date: 20 January 2007, 01:59 UTC
- Undocking date: 1 August 2007, 14:07 UTC
- Time docked: 193 days

Cargo
- Mass: 2500 kg
- Progress ISS Resupply

Progress M-59 (Russian: Прогресс М-59), identified by NASA as Progress 24P, was a Progress spacecraft used to resupply the International Space Station. It was a Progress-M 11F615A55 spacecraft, with the serial number 359.

== Launch ==
Progress M-59 was launched by a Soyuz-U carrier rocket from Site 1/5 at the Baikonur Cosmodrome. Launch occurred at 02:12:13 UTC on 18 January 2007.

== Docking ==
The spacecraft docked with the Pirs module at 01:59 UTC on 20 January 2007. It remained docked for 193 days before undocking at 14:07 UTC on 1 August 2007. It was deorbited at 18:42 UTC the same day. The spacecraft burned up in the atmosphere over the Pacific Ocean, with any remaining debris landing in the ocean at around 19:26 UTC.

Progress M-59 carried supplies to the International Space Station, including food, water and oxygen for the crew and equipment for conducting scientific research. Its cargo included components for the Space Station's life support system.

== See also ==
- List of Progress flights
- Uncrewed spaceflights to the International Space Station
