= JPL and the Space Age =

American television series created by JPL

JPL and the Space Age is an American television series that is created by NASA's Jet Propulsion Laboratory. Its episodes characterize the history of spacecraft, and crewed missions.

== History ==
JPL and the Space Age was created in 2022 to inform users about JPLs contributions and missions.

JPL and the Space Age started airing on NASA TV and JPLs website. The first episode released for the franchise was The American Rocketeer, releasing in January 2022. The series later migrated to NASA+ in November 2023.

== Episodes ==
As of December 2023, JPL has created 16 documentary's for the franchise.

Episode list

- Episode 1: The American Rocketeer
- Episode 2: Explorer 1
- Episode 3: Destination Moon
- Episode 4: The Changing Face of Mars
- Episode 5: The Stuff of Dreams
- Episode 6: The Footsteps of Voyager
- Episode 7: To the Rescue
- Episode 8: The Pathfinders
- Episode 9: The Breaking Point
- Episode 10: Saving Galileo
- Episode 11: Mission to Mars
- Episode 12: Landing on Mars
- Episode 13: Triumph at Saturn (Part I)
- Episode 14: Triumph at Saturn (Part II)
- Episode 15: Sky High
- Episode 16: The Hunt for Space Rocks.
