= NASA Explorers =

NASA+ Original Television Series

NASA Explorers is an American television series made for NASA+, deemed as a NASA+ Original. The series depicts topics such as the OSIRIS-REx mission, the Artemis program, microgravity, climate change, and Earth's cryosphere.

== History ==
On November 8, 2023, NASA released a streaming service named NASA+. Along with the release would be 25 original series all made by NASA. The franchise started out with 24 episodes.

== Season Topics ==
=== OSIRIS-REx ===
Starting November 7, 2023, the season's primary focus was the embracing mission of OSIRIS-REx. Five episodes for the season were made, each depicting part of the mission in a chronological sequence.

- Episode 1: The Launch
- Episode 2: Challenges of Bennu
- Episode 3: TAG
- Episode 4: Preparing for the Asteroid
- Episode 5: Sample Return

=== Artemis Generation ===
Starting October 31, 2023, the season depicts the preparation of the Artemis program. Four episodes have been made as of December 2023.

- Episode 1: We Are the Artemis Generation
- Episode 2: Moon Rocks
- Episode 3: Space School
- Episode 4: The South Pole.

=== Microgravity ===
Starting October 31, 2023, the season's main subject is microgravity, its costs and how astronauts safely deal with the problems of microgravity. Seven episodes have been made.

- Episode 1: Orbiting Laboratory
- Episode 2: The Scientists
- Episode 3: Training the Astronauts
- Episode 4: Before the Rocket
- Episode 5: Journey to Space
- Episode 6: On Station
- Episode 7: Back to Gravity.

=== Fires ===
Starting October 31, 2023, the season depicts how climatologists study the rapid wildfires the Earth is experiencing due to climate change. Six episodes have been made.

- Episode 1: Seeing Through Smoke
- Episode 2: Follow that Plume!
- Episode 3: The Carbon Problem
- Episode 4: Chasing Clouds
- Episode 5: The New Normal
- Episode 6: A Year in Fire.

=== Cryosphere ===
Starting October 31, 2023, the season depicts how climatologists study the cryosphere, how it is being affected by climate change, and what we know about our cryosphere. 11 episodes have been created.

- Episode 1: The Big Thaw
- Episode 2: The Snow Below
- Episode 3: Ice Odyssey
- Episode 4: Glacial Pace
- Episode 5: Frozen Worlds
- Episode 6: High Mountain Glaciers
- Episode 7: Permafrost
- Episode 8: The Launch
- Episode 9: Final Approach
- Episode 10: Flying Alaskan Glaciers
- Episode 11: Cryo Kids.
