= Soyuz TMA-03M =

2011 Russian crewed spaceflight to the ISS

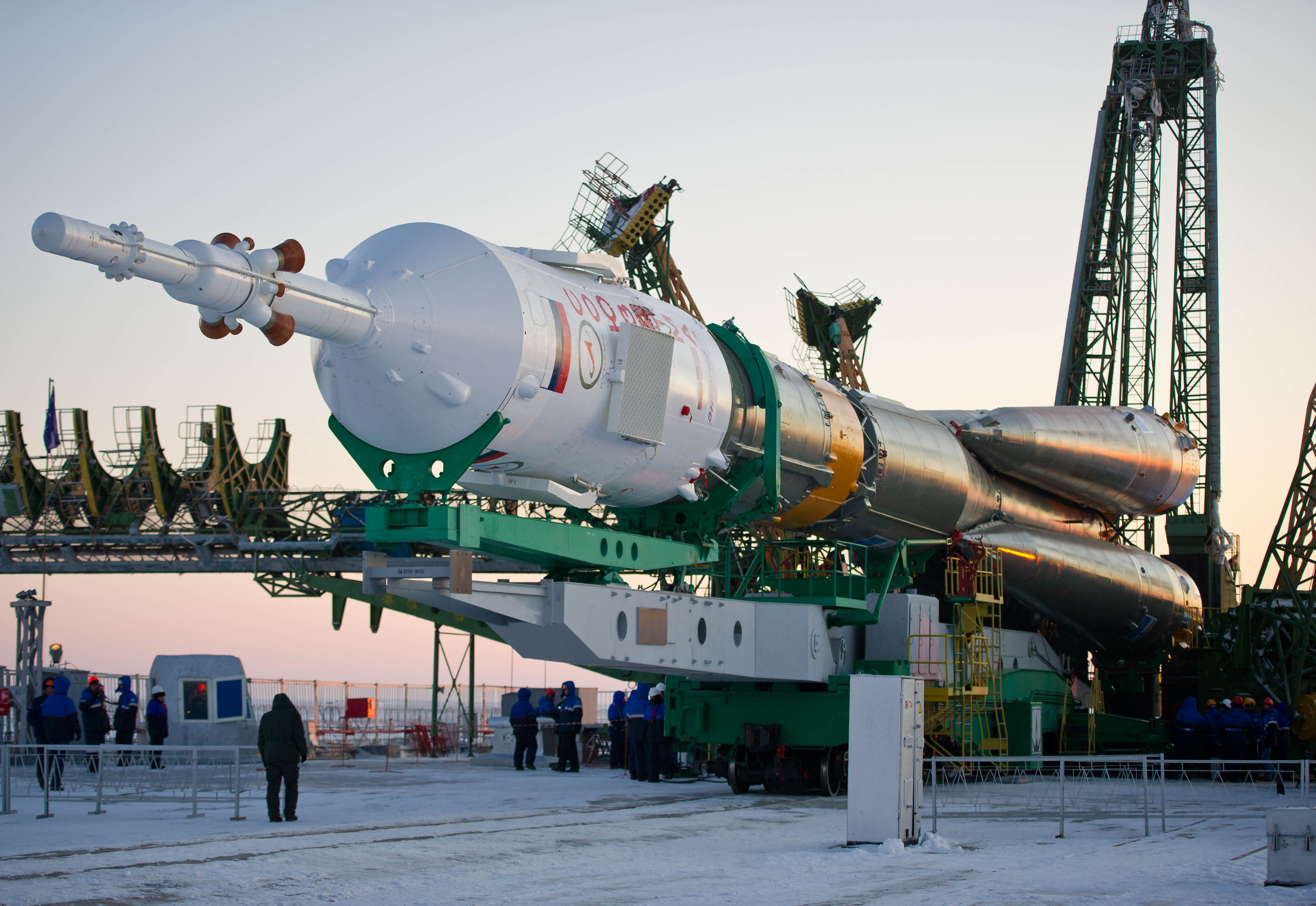
- TMA-03M rollout in Baikonur
- Operator: Roscosmos
- COSPAR ID: 2011-078A
- SATCAT no.: 38036
- Mission duration: 192d, 18h, 58m

Spacecraft properties
- Spacecraft type: Soyuz TMA-M
- Manufacturer: Energia

Crew
- Crew size: 3
- Members: Oleg Kononenko; André Kuipers; Donald Pettit
- Callsign: Antares

Start of mission
- Launch date: 21 December 2011, 13:16 UTC
- Rocket: Soyuz FG
- Launch site: Baikonur, Site 1/5

End of mission
- Landing date: 1 July 2012, 08:14 UTC
- Landing site: 146 km SE of Dzhezkazgan, Kazakhstan 47°20′56.3″N 69°32′47.4″E

Orbital parameters
- Reference system: Geocentric
- Regime: Low Earth

Docking with ISS
- Docking port: Rassvet nadir
- Docking date: 23 December 2011; 15:19 UTC
- Undocking date: 1 July 2012; 04:47 UTC
- Time docked: 190d 13h 28m
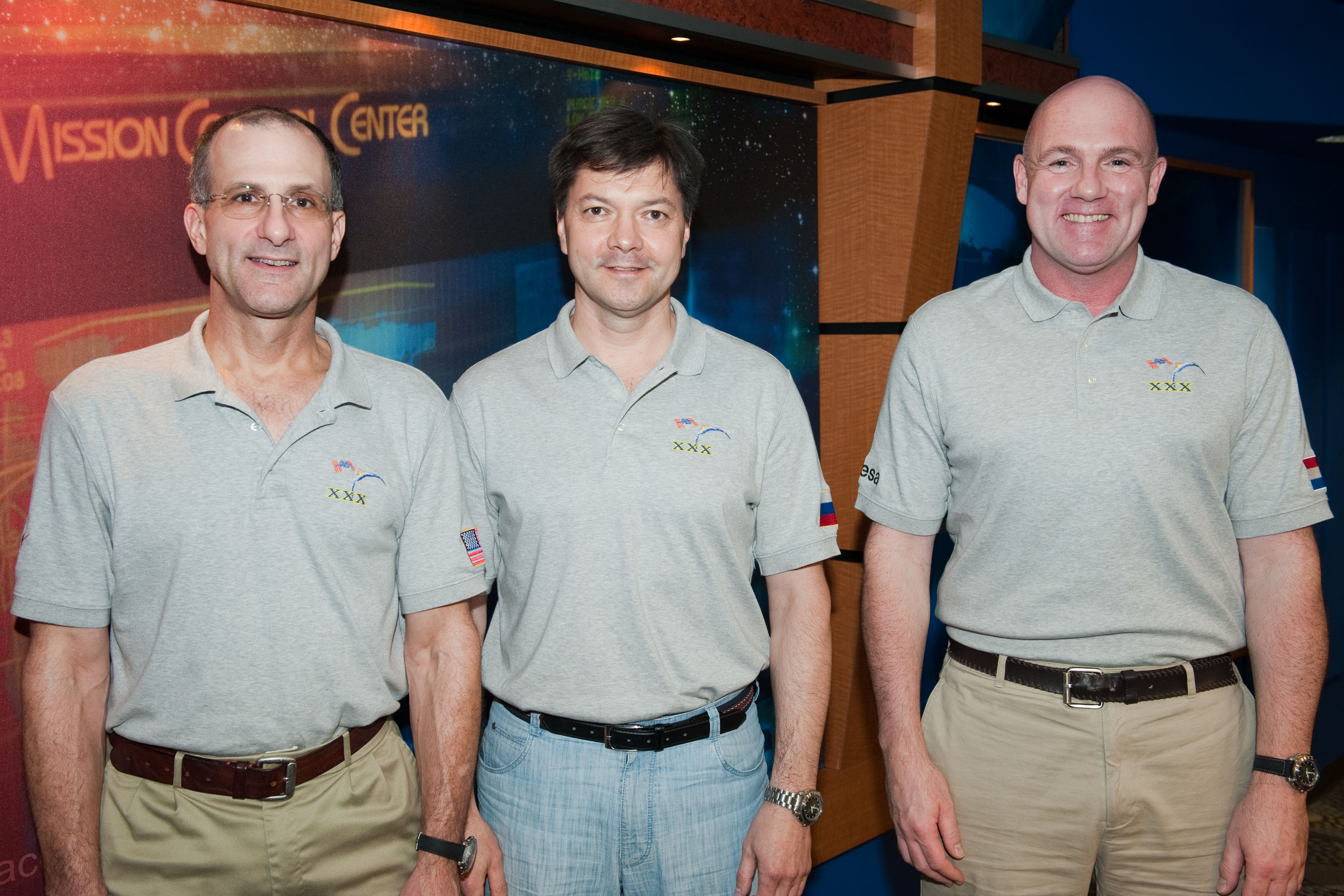
- From left to right: Pettit, Kononenko and Kuipers Soyuz programme (Crewed missions)

Soyuz TMA-03M was a spaceflight to the International Space Station (ISS). It launched on 21 December 2011 from Site One at the Baikonur Cosmodrome, Kazakhstan, carrying three members of Expedition 30 to the ISS. TMA-03M was the 112th flight of a Russian Soyuz spacecraft, since the first in 1967, and the third flight of the modernised Soyuz-TMA-M version.

The docking with the International Space Station took place at 19:19 Moscow Time on 23 December, three minutes ahead of schedule. The Soyuz remained aboard the space station for the Expedition 30 increment to serve as an emergency escape vehicle if needed.

The crew were Oleg Kononenko (Russia, commander), André Kuipers (the Netherlands) and Donald Pettit (United States). The European segment of the mission was called "PromISSe". The capsule used in the mission can be seen at the Space Expo visitors centre at the European Space Research and Technology Centre in Noordwijk, Netherlands.

== Crew ==
Position	Crew Member
Commander	(Russia) Oleg Kononenko, Roscosmos; Expedition 30; Second spaceflight
Flight Engineer 1	(Netherlands) André Kuipers, ESA; Expedition 30; Second and last spaceflight
Flight Engineer 2	(United States) Donald Pettit, NASA; Expedition 30; Third spaceflight

=== Backup crew ===
Position	Crew Member
Commander	(Russia) Yuri Malenchenko, Roscosmos
Flight Engineer 1	(United States) Sunita Williams, NASA
Flight Engineer 2	(Japan) Akihiko Hoshide, JAXA

== Mission insignia ==
The Soyuz TMA-03M mission insignia (or 'patch') was designed by Luc van den Abeelen, partially based on artwork by 11-year-old Alena Gerasimova from Petrozavodsk, Russia. Former Roscosmos head Anatoly Perminov officially approved the patch on 9 March 2011. The Soyuz TMA-03M patch was the final patch based on the children's competition initiated for the Soyuz TMA-14 flight. The children's project had been organized by Roscosmos Public Relations and in mid-2011 the Gagarin Cosmonaut Training Center took over responsibility for the operational aspects of the Soyuz patches.

== Mission details ==
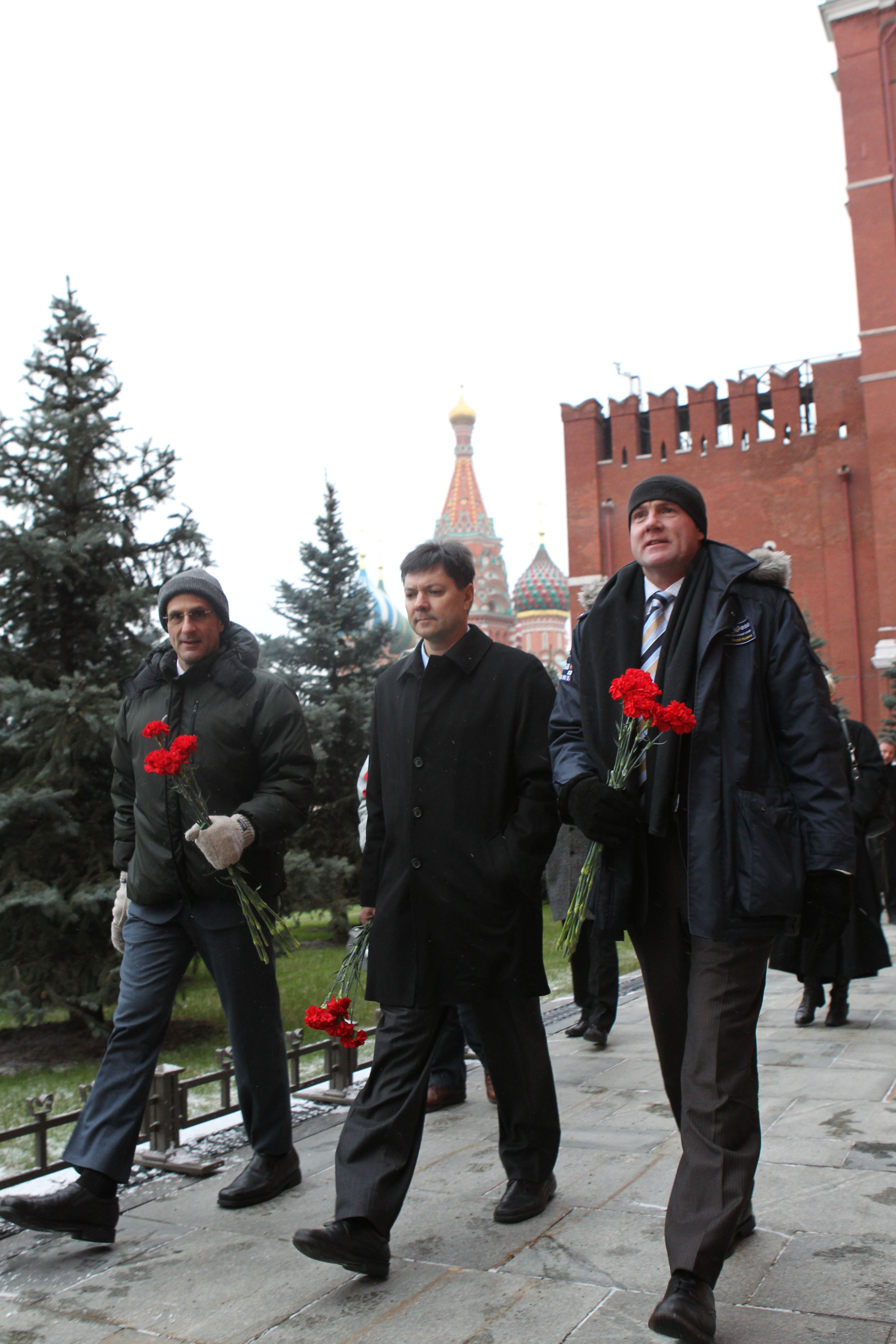
The Soyuz TMA-03M crew members conduct their ceremonial tour of Red Square on 1 December 2011.

The mission launched on 21 December 2011, at 17:16:15 Moscow time (13:16:15 GMT) using the Soyuz-FG rocket system. After a 528-second flight, Soyuz ТМА-03М successfully disconnected from the third stage on a satellite orbit. Soyuz Commander Kononenko was launched from the Soyuz's center seat with flight engineer Donald Pettit strapped in to his right and ESA astronaut Andre Kuipers on his left.

The launch occurred a little more than an hour after sunset at Baikonur in bitterly cold weather with temperatures near -18 degrees Celsius (0 F). Live television footage from inside the spacecraft's showed the crew members looking relaxed as they monitored the automated ascent. Shortly after the Soyuz slipped into a preliminary orbit, the Russian Mission Control said "Congratulations, guys, on a good insertion, (there are) no issues with telemetry or anything at all at this time, We wish you best of luck. You are experienced people, I'm sure everything is going to go very well".

During the next two days after the launch, three major rendezvous burns were performed to put the spacecraft on a refined path to the ISS.

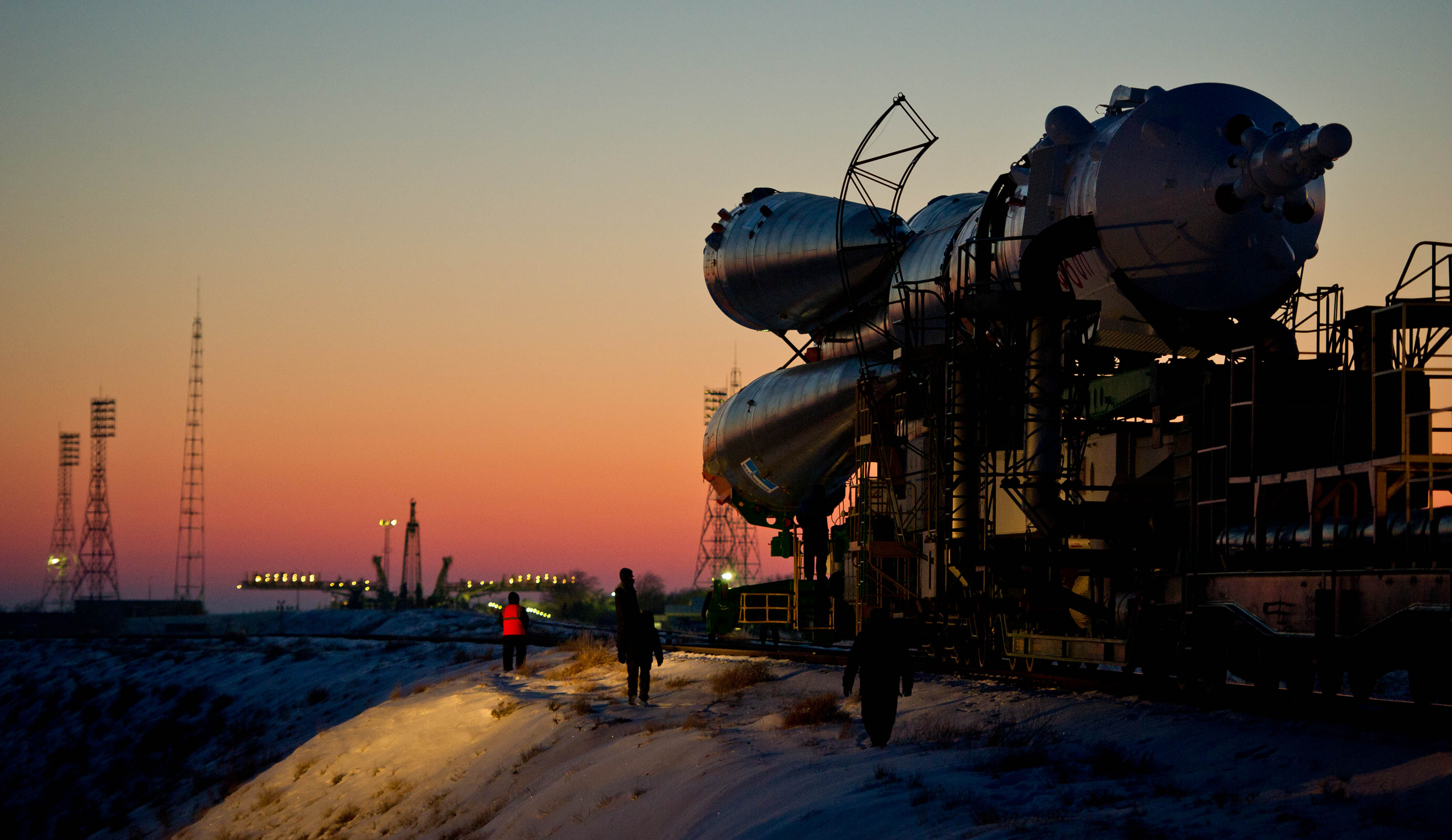
Rolling out to launch pad.

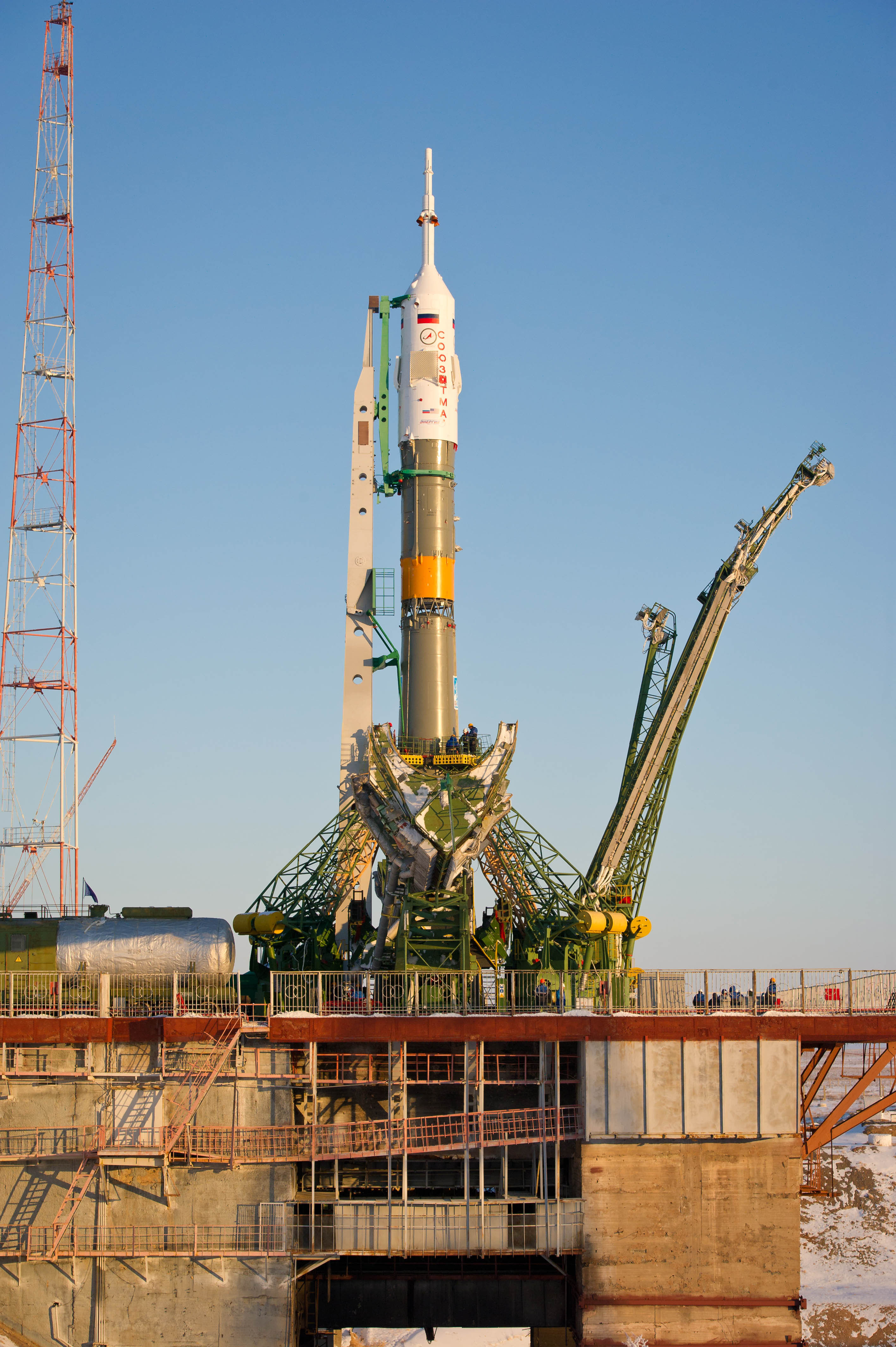
Soyuz TMA-03M spacecraft seen at the launch pad on 19 December 2011.

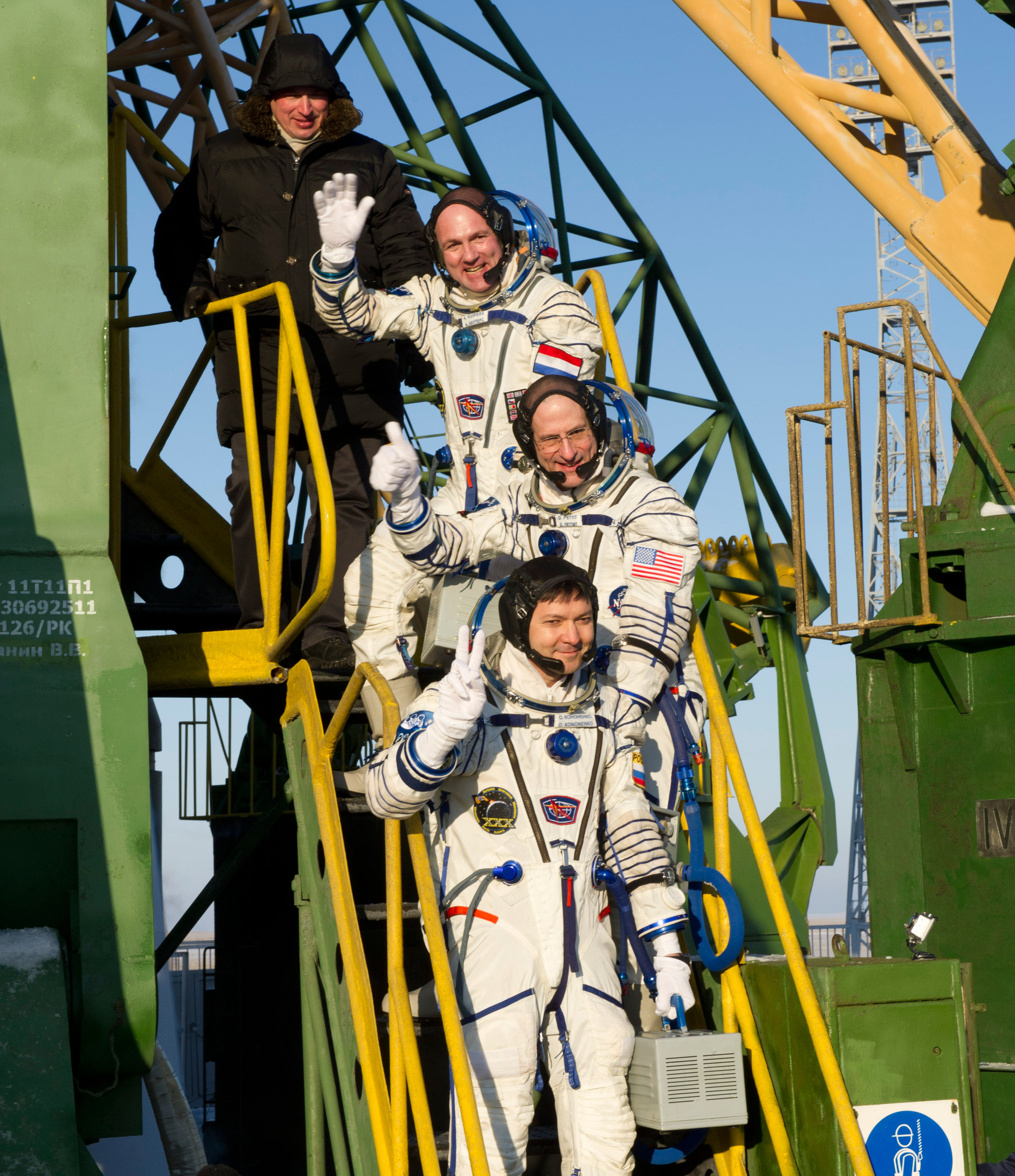
Soyuz TMA-03M crew members wave farewell from the base of the rocket.

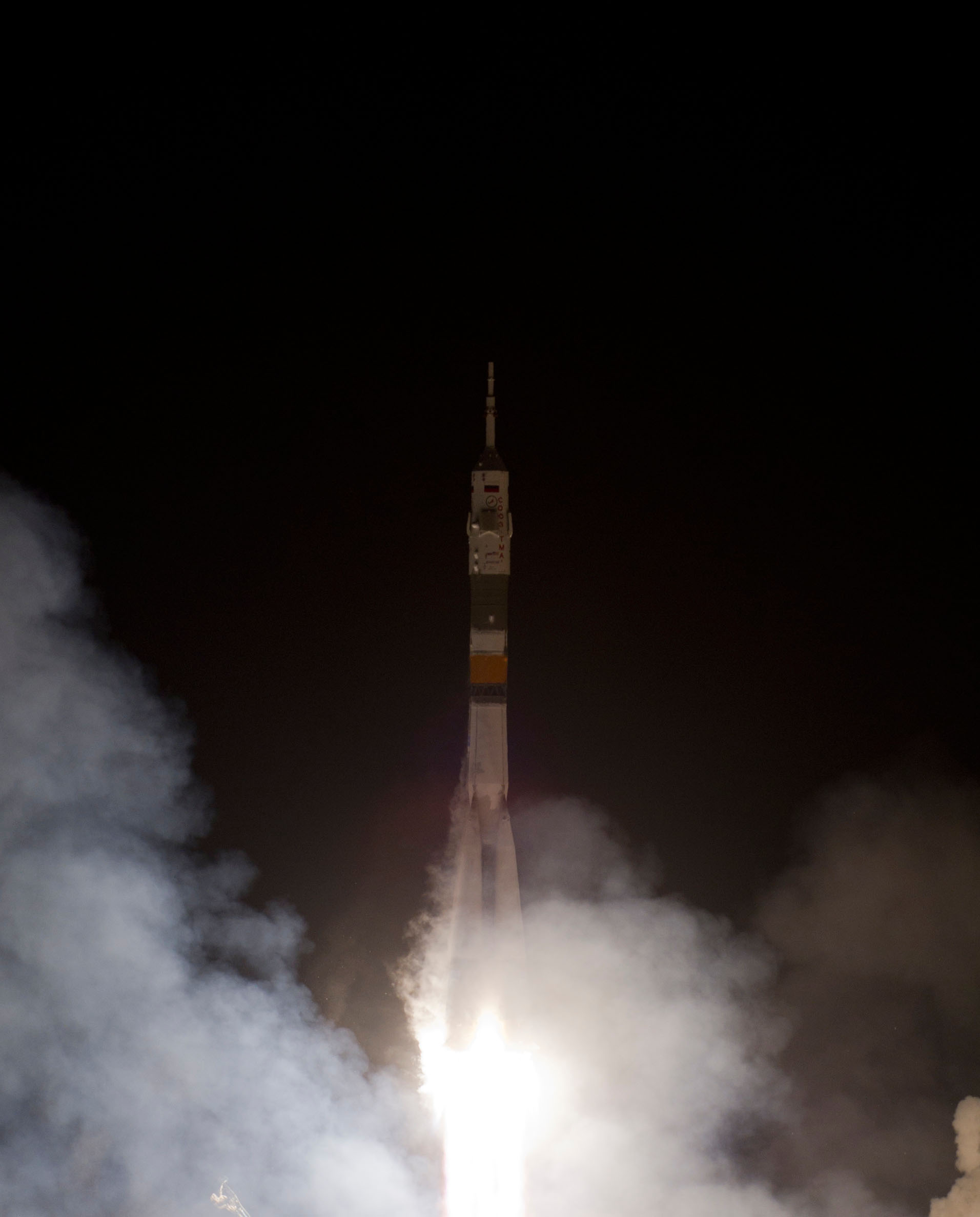
Soyuz TMA-03M lifts off from Baikonur on 21 December 2011.

=== Docking ===
Following the two-day rendezvous, the Soyuz spacecraft successfully docked to the Mini Research Module-1 (MRM-1) "Rassvet" Nadir docking port at 15:19 GMT on 23 December 2011. The port was vacated just over one month earlier by the Soyuz TMA-02M.

The entire process of approaching and docking with the ISS went nominally as planned. After arriving in the vicinity of the ISS, the spacecraft made a short flyaround maneuver to achieve a perfect alignment with the Docking Port on the Rassvet Module. The station keeping started at a distance of 200 meters to the docking target. This gave teams inside the Russian Mission Control adequate time to evaluate systems and alignment. The final GO for approach came after just a few minutes and Soyuz Commander Kononenko sent the command for the final phase of the docking operation. The docking occurred three minutes ahead of previously announced time of 19:22:41 Moscow Time when the Soyuz TMA-03M gently came into contact with the ISS at a relative velocity of less than 0.3 m/s. At the time of docking, the two spacecraft were sailing 240 miles over southern Russia.

Soft Docking was confirmed shortly thereafter and hooks and latches were closed 10 minutes after docking to form a hard-mate between space station and the Soyuz TMA-03M spacecraft. Extensive leak checks and vehicle reconfigurations were made from both sides of the docking system before Mission Control gave a GO to open the hatches between the Soyuz TMA-03M spacecraft and the ISS. Following the hatch opening, the crew members floated aboard the ISS to greet the already-aboard Dan Burbank, Anton Shkaplerov and Anatoli Ivanishin. Together, the two crews formed the full group of Expedition 30 until March 2012.

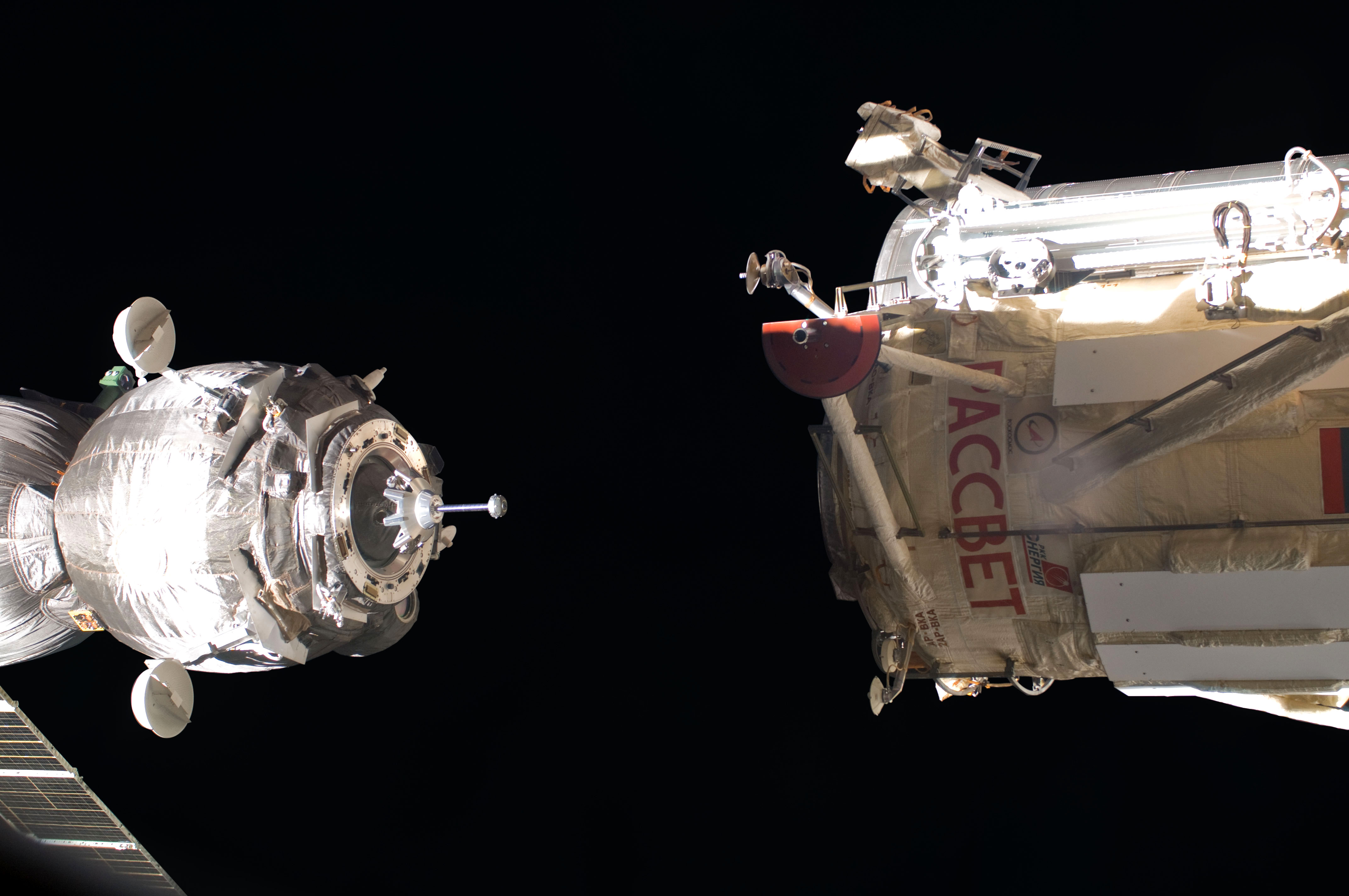
Soyuz TMA-03M approaches the Rassvet module for docking.

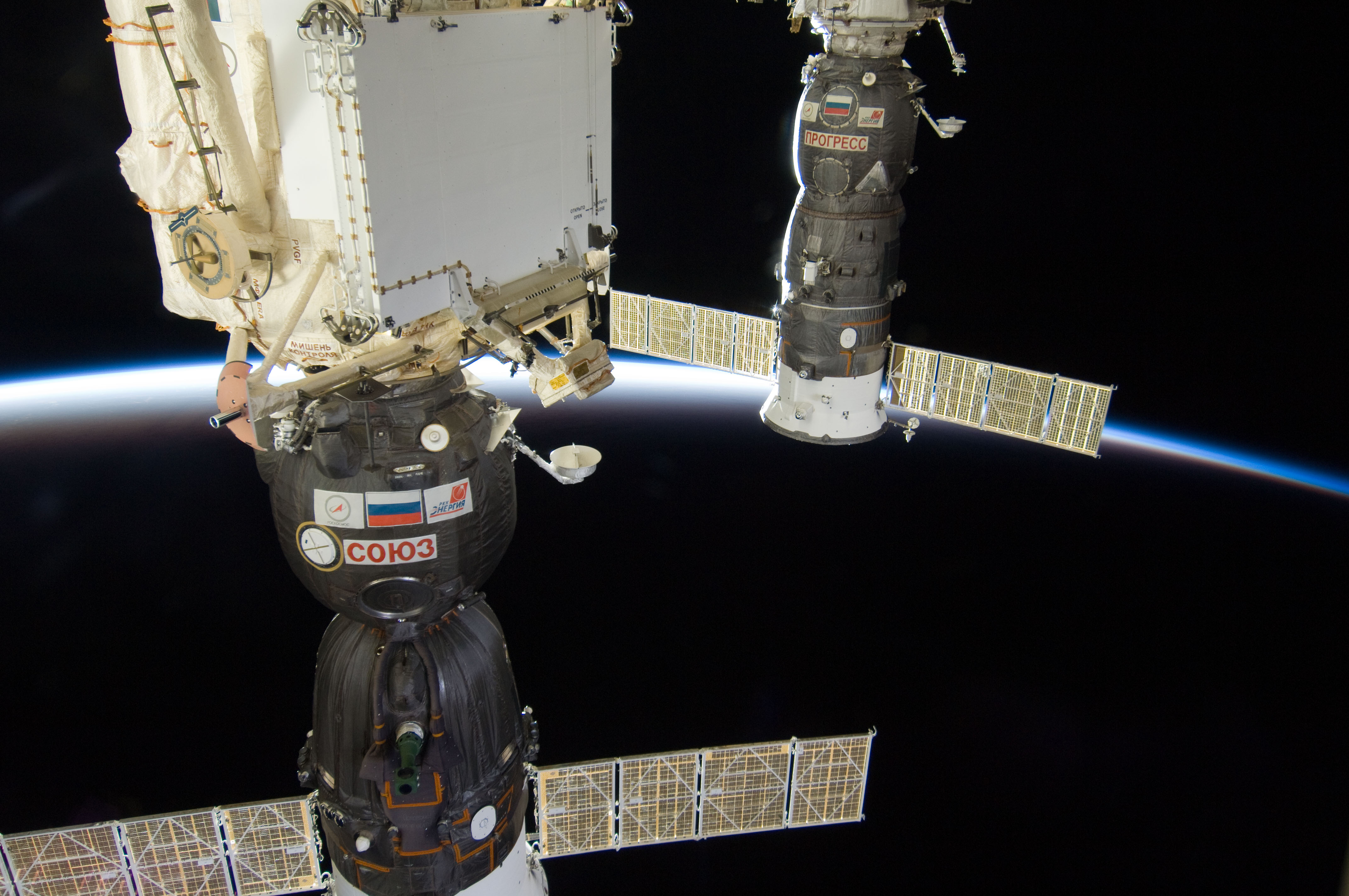
Soyuz TMA-03M docked to Rassvet and Progress M-13M docked to Pirs.

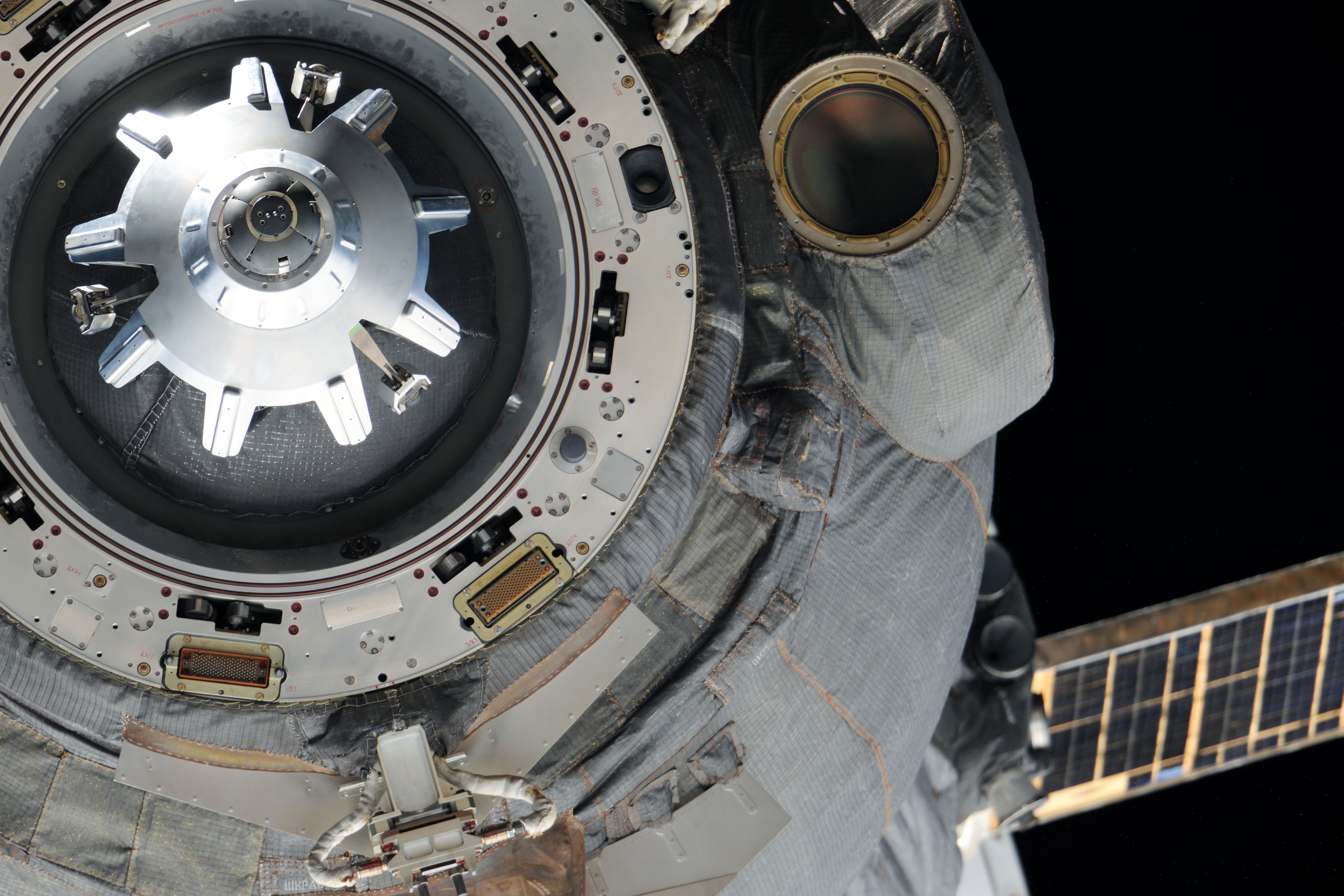
Soyuz TMA-03M undocks from the Rassvet Mini-Research Module.

=== Return to Earth ===
Soyuz TMA-03M undocked from the ISS on 1 July 2012 at 4:47 AM (GMT), carrying Pettit, Kononenko and Kuipers, and landed safely near Zhezkazgan, Kazakhstan, at 8:14 AM the same day. The spacecraft's departure ended Expedition 31, and left astronauts Gennady Padalka, Sergei Revin and Joseph Acaba aboard the station to begin Expedition 32.

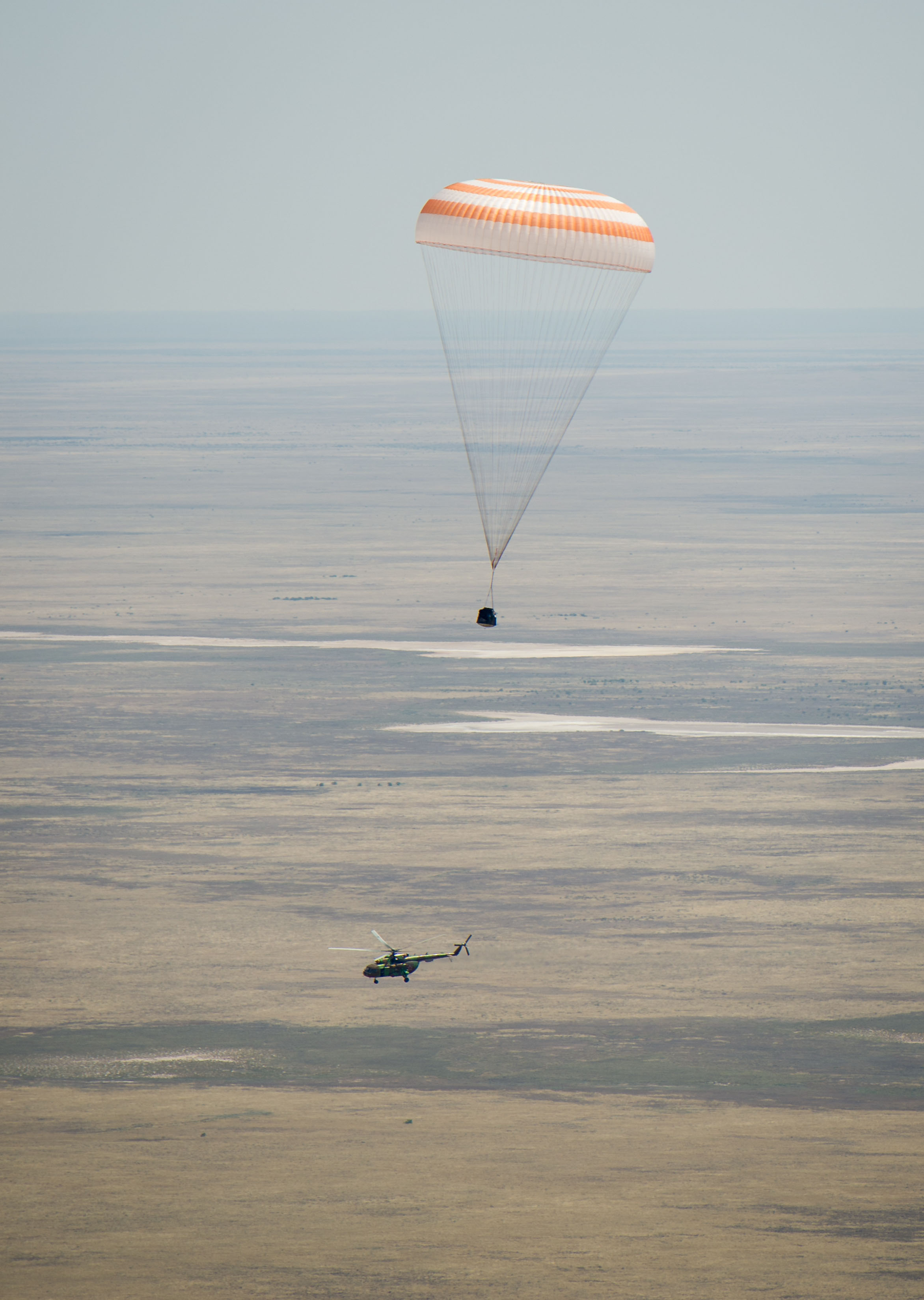
The Soyuz TMA-03M capsule descends past helicopter.

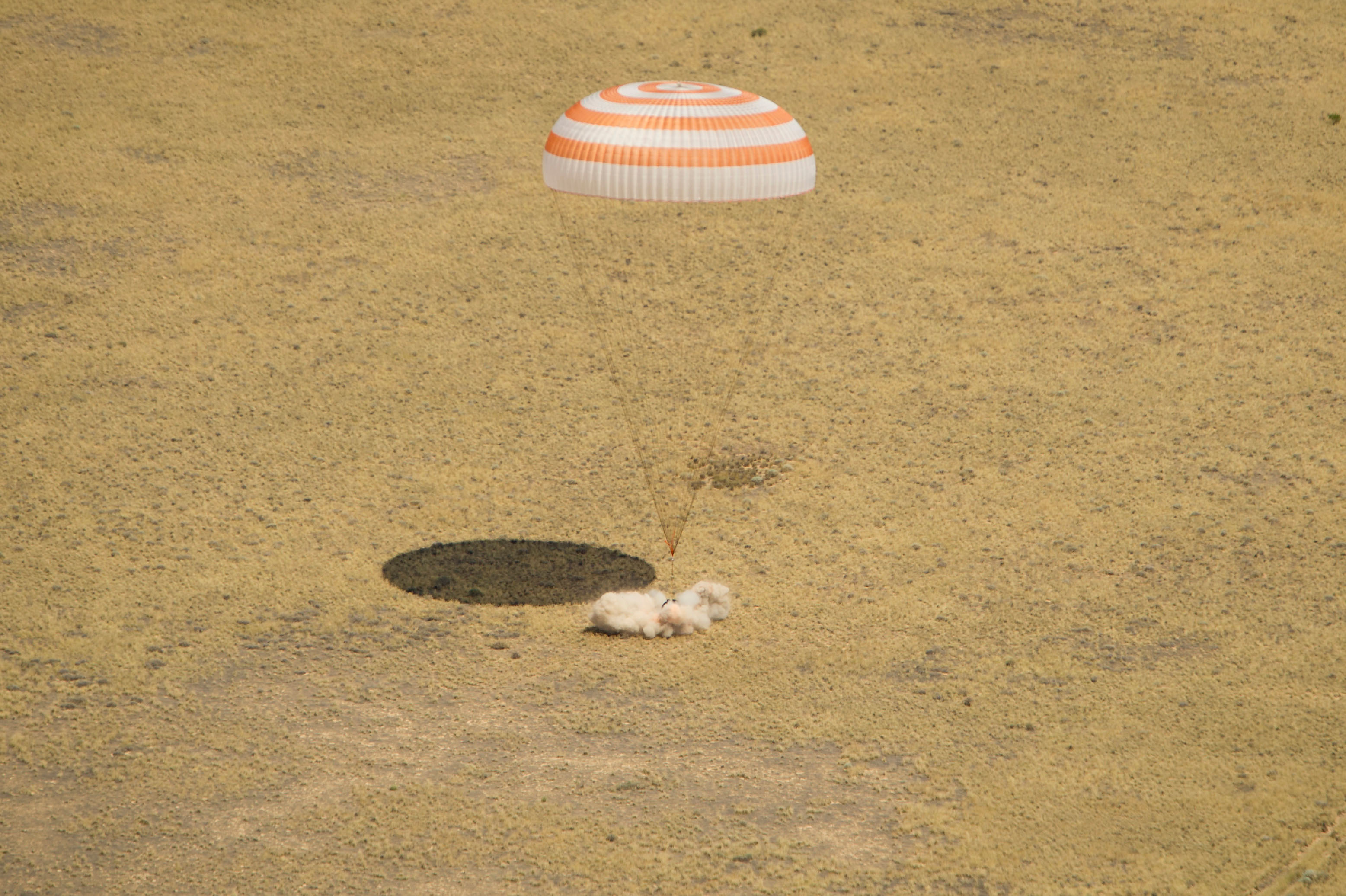
The Soyuz TMA-03M spacecraft lands in central Kazakhstan.

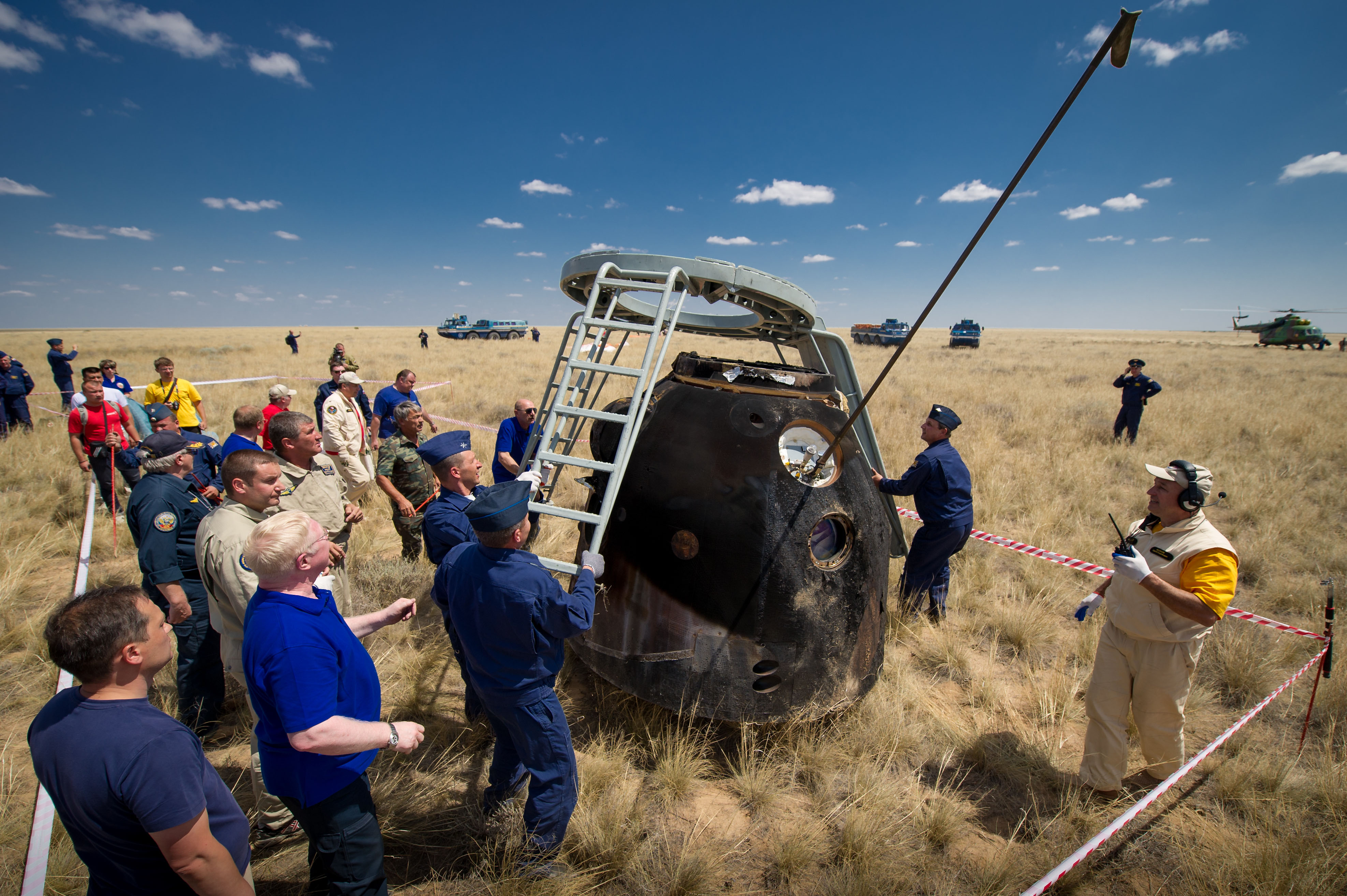
Russian Search and Rescue crews attach ladders and a slide for access to the capsule.

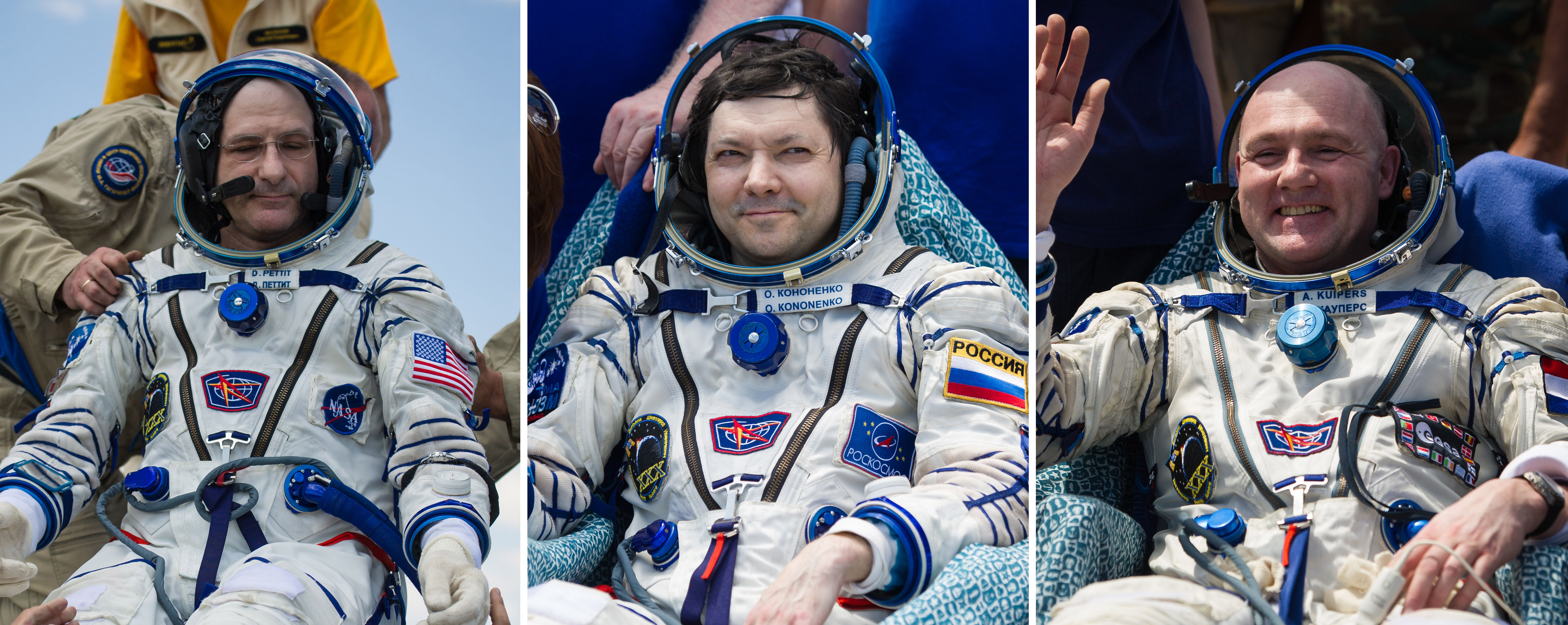
The Soyuz crew is pictured shortly after landing.

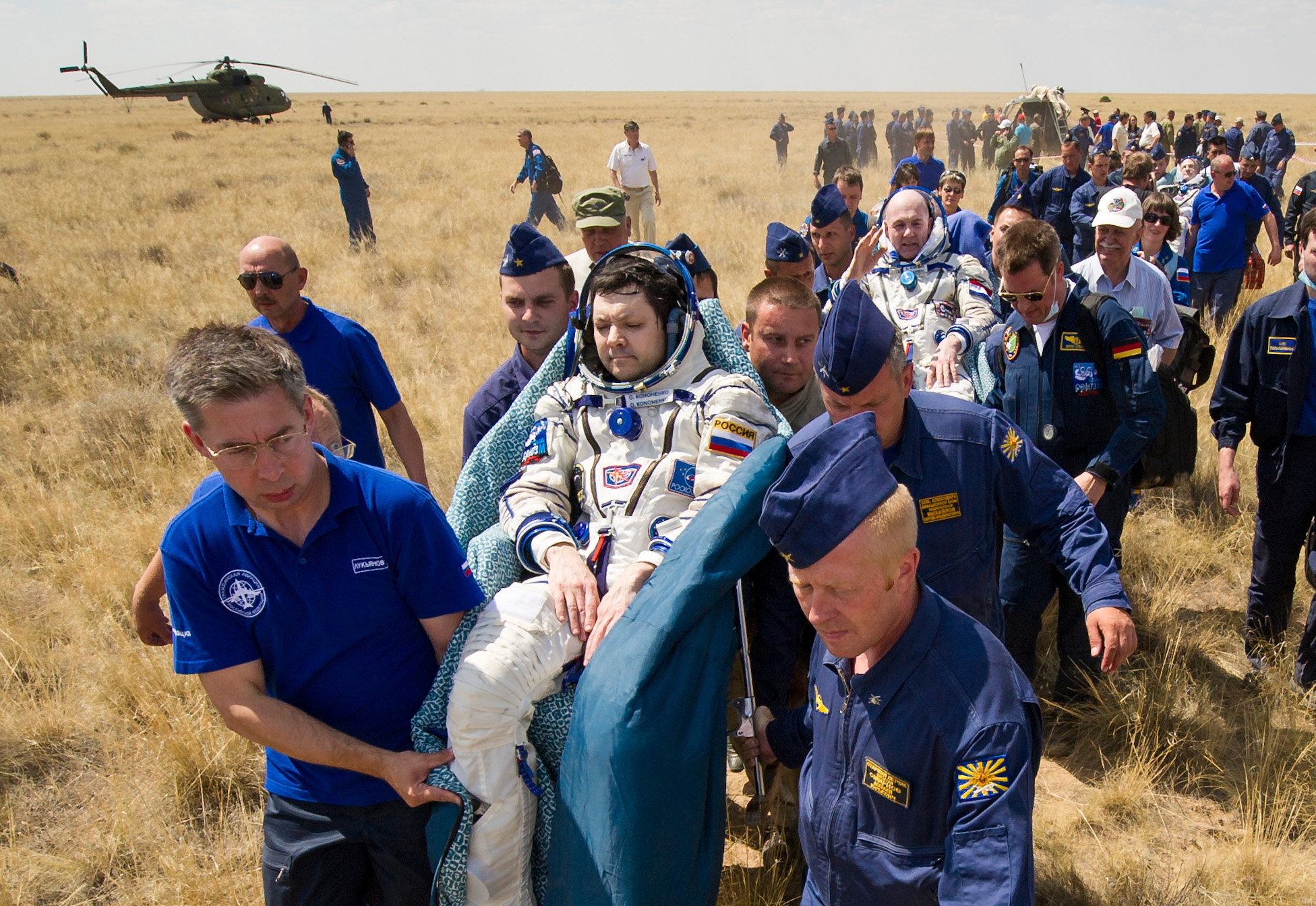
Support and medical personnel carry the crew to the medical tent.

== Spacecraft location ==
The Soyuz TMA-03M capsule is exhibited as a permanent display in Space Expo, the museum and visitor centre of the European Space Research and Technology Centre (ESTEC) in Noordwijk, Netherlands, which is the main technology complex of the European Space Agency. The capsule has been on display there since 19 September 2016, along with the spacesuit that André Kuipers wore for the mission.
