= Progress M-14M =

Russian spacecraft

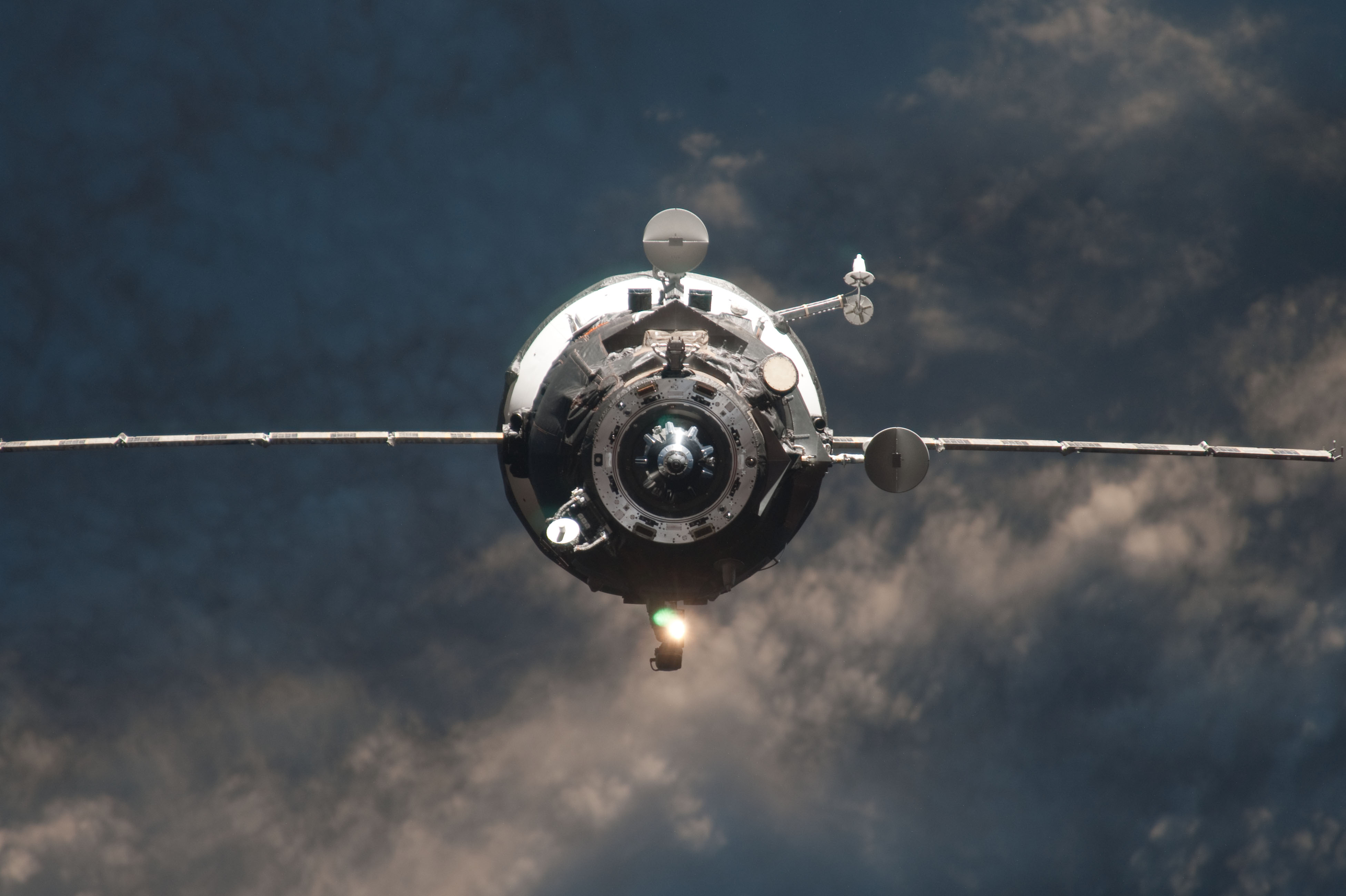
- Progress M-14M approaches the ISS on 27 January 2012.
- Mission type: ISS resupply
- Operator: Roskosmos
- COSPAR ID: 2012-004A
- SATCAT no.: 38073
- Mission duration: 94 days

Spacecraft properties
- Spacecraft type: Progress-M s/n 414
- Manufacturer: RKK Energia

Start of mission
- Launch date: 25 January 2012, 23:06:40 UTC
- Rocket: Soyuz-U
- Launch site: Baikonur, Site 1/5

End of mission
- Disposal: Deorbited
- Decay date: 28 April 2012

Orbital parameters
- Reference system: Geocentric
- Regime: Low Earth
- Perigee altitude: 193 km
- Apogee altitude: 245 km
- Inclination: 51.66°
- Period: 88.59 minutes
- Epoch: 25 January 2012

Docking with ISS
- Docking port: Pirs
- Docking date: 28 January 2012, 00:08:57 UTC
- Undocking date: 19 April 2012, 11:04 UTC
- Time docked: 82 days

Cargo
- Mass: 2669 kg
- Pressurised: 1410 kg (dry cargo)
- Fuel: 930 kg
- Gaseous: 50 kg
- Water: 420 kg
- Progress ISS Resupply

Progress M-14M (Russian: Прогресс М-14М), identified by NASA as Progress 46P, is a Progress spacecraft which was used by Roskosmos to resupply the International Space Station during 2012. The fourteenth Progress-M 11F615A60 spacecraft, it had the serial number 414 and was built by RKK Energia. Upon its arrival in late January 2012, it delivered supplies to the Expedition 30 crew aboard the space station, where it remained docked until 19 April 2012.

== Launch ==
Progress M-14M was launched at 23:06:40 UTC on 25 January 2012. It was launched from Site 1/5 at the Baikonur Cosmodrome, by a Soyuz-U carrier rocket. In preparation for the launch, the spacecraft was fuelled at Site 31 on 18 January 2012, before being moved to Site 254 for final assembly, and mating with the third stage and fairing. This was mated to the lower stages of the carrier rocket at Site 112 on 23 January 2012, and rolled out to the launch pad at 01:00 UTC on 24 January 2012.

== Orbit ==
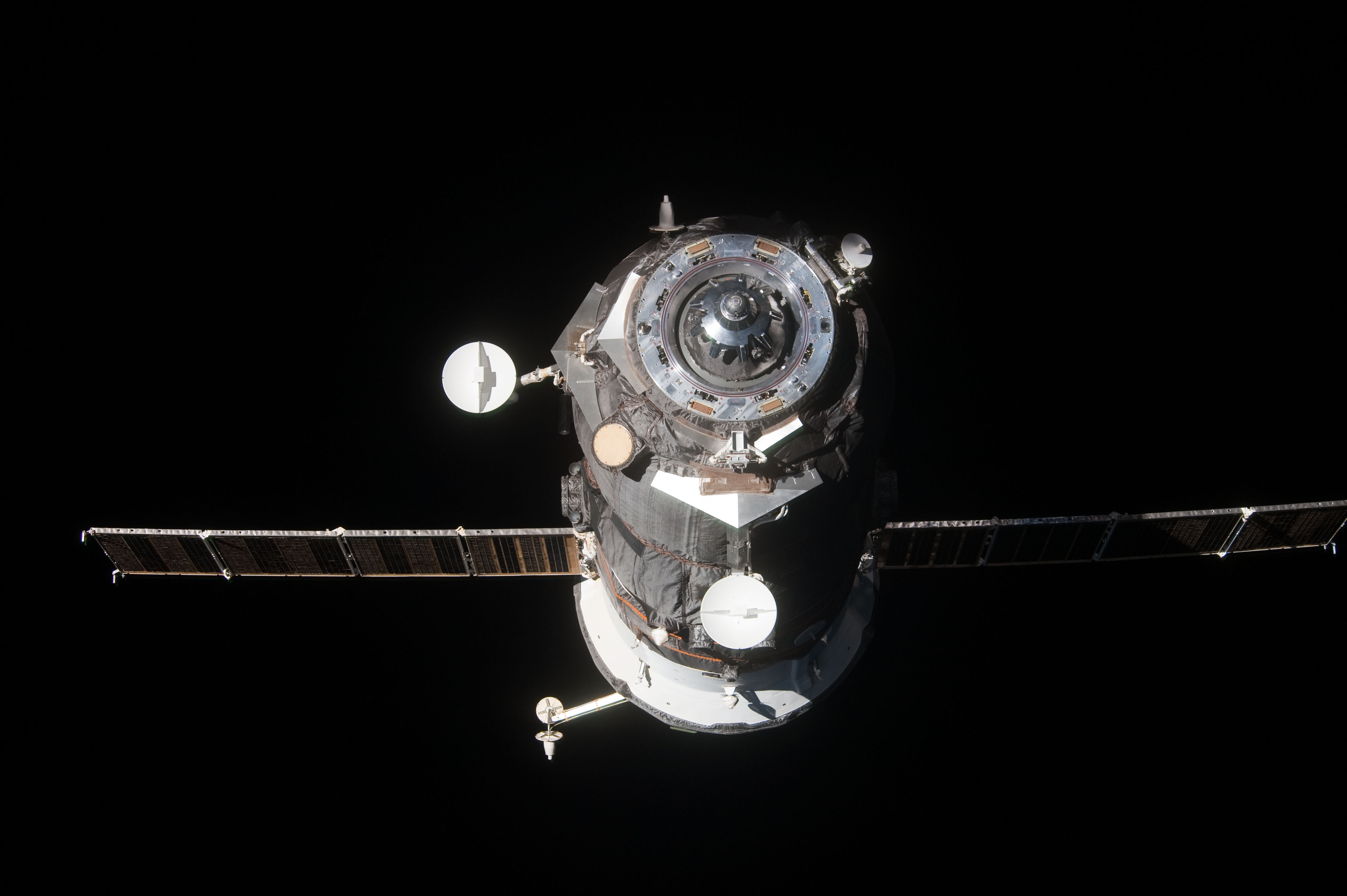
Progress M-14M departs the ISS on 19 April 2012.

About 529 seconds after launch, the spacecraft separated from the Soyuz-U into a low Earth orbit with a target perigee of 193 kilometres (120 mi), apogee of 245 kilometres (152 mi) and 51.66° of Orbital inclination.

It spent a little over two days in free flight, during which time it conducted two main engine burns and a firing of its manoeuvring thrusters to raise its orbit before docking with the Pirs module of the International Space Station on 28 January 2012 at around 00:08:57 UTC; the docking port had been vacated by Progress M-13M on 23 January 2012.

Progress M-14M undocked on 19 April 2012 at 11:04 UTC from the Pirs Module, making way for Progress M-15M. Unlike most Progress departures, Progress M-14M will spend additional time on orbit in order to carry out the "Radar-Progress" experiment, sounding the ionospheric environment as modified by thruster firings. The experiment will be conducted by the Siberian Institute of Solar-Earth Physics of the Russian Academy of Sciences. The radar participating in the experiment is located in the Irkutsk region in southern Siberia.

The Progress M-14M spacecraft deorbited on 28 April 2012 at around 13:46 UTC and sank in the Pacific Ocean upon its reentry.

== See also ==
- 2012 in spaceflight
- List of Progress flights
- Uncrewed spaceflights to the International Space Station
