= ESA Television =

- Broadcast area: Europe

Ownership
- Owner: European Space Agency

Links
- Website: ESA Television

ESA Television is the television network of the European Space Agency. It is a satellite-only broadcast network which periodically transmits programming via Eutelsat's Eutelsat 9A satellite to Europe, North Africa, and the Middle East as part of the Europe by Satellite public information service. In addition, live events are transmitted via different Eutelsat satellites covering the European continent.

In the years leading to 2008, ESA did not broadcast simultaneously over the internet, but did (and does) make programming available for download via an FTP website, which requires users to log in to access material. A username and password is made available by registering for the ESA Television Notification Service.

In 2008, ESA began webstreaming some activities using the Livestream.com platform. The channel aims to provide coverage of launches, astronauts and space exploration, and provides regular webcasts from ESA establishments in Europe, launches from Europe's spaceport in Kourou and from anywhere that ESA missions fly.

== See also ==
- NASA TV
- TV Roskosmos
