= TV Roskosmos =

TV Roskosmos Russian: Телестудия Роскосмоса
- Country: Russia
- Broadcast area: Russia
- Headquarters: Moscow, Russia

Programming
- Language: Russian

Ownership
- Owner: Russian Federal Space Agency

Links
- Website: TVRoscosmos.ru

TV Roskosmos (Russian: Телестудия Роскосмоса - TeleStudio of Roskosmos), or TV Roscosmos, is the television station of the Russian Federal Space Agency, Roscosmos. Both the channel and the studio are managed by Alexander Nikolayevich Ostrovsky (Russian: Александр Николаевич Островский). Unlike its United States counterpart, NASA TV, it does not operate 24 hours a day; it also has a YouTube channel. During coverage related to the International Space Station, NASA TV will sometimes carry Roskosmos TV segments with English voiceovers.

Also affiliated with Roscosmos, Roscosmos TV-Studio produces and promotes documentaries that highlight the most significant historic events in Russia's national space industry and aboard. The studio's films, programmes, and reports focus on cutting-edge space technology and the people involved in space programmes, including scientists, designers, and cosmonauts. Videos on the history of Soviet and Russian cosmonautics also cover topics in astronomy and planetology.

== History ==
Roscosmos TV-Studio, the television studio of Roscosmos, was established on 11 January 2005. Since then, over 100 documentaries have been produced, all of which were broadcast on the Russian national TV channels.

From July 2006 to July 2016, round-the-clock news channel Russia-24 hosted a weekly broadcast of Roscosmos TV-Studio's programme Kosmonavtika (Cosmonautics), which highlighted the latest achievements of Russian cosmonautics.

From September 2008, the programme was anchored by cosmonaut Fyodor Yurchikhin.

From April 2010 to March 2011, the TV-Studio's almanac-programme Russian Space was aired on the educational channel My Planet.

Since March 2008, the studio has provided live broadcasts of launches from Baikonur Cosmodrome and Russian operations on the International Space Station (ISS).

TV-Studio also produces promotional videos about the national space industry for international aerospace shows and exhibitions, as well as commercial films on behalf of Roscosmos enterprises. From March 2007 to March 2009, TV-Studio aired a joint weekly programme devoted to cosmonautics, Poyekhali!, on the radio station Zvezda FM. From November 2009 to July 2011, Voice of Russia (Golos Rossii) broadcast the joint programme Space Wednesday. In 2007, the studio began its regular participation in domestic and international television contests.

On 11 April 2008, Roscosmos TV-Studio's website was officially launched.

== Staff ==
The chief executive of Roscosmos TV-Studio is Alexander Ostrovsky. The studio's staff is composed of editors, correspondents, and cameramen who have professional experience with Russian national central television.

== Films ==
The TV-Studio produces:

- weekly news programme Cosmonautics on the Russian information channel Rossiya 24
- weekly TV-almanac Russian Space on TV-Channel Rossiya 2 and educational satellite channel My Planet
- documentaries
- commercial videos
- space related video presentations

Documentaries	Video Presentations
White Sun of Baikonur (2006, RTR)	60 Years of RNII KP (2006)
The Tsar-Rocket: Interrupted Flight (2006, TVC)	65 Years of FGUP NPP VNIIEM (2006)
Russian Speaking Space (2007, Kultura)	Space Orbits of Samara (2007)
First on Mars: The Unsung Song of Sergey Korolyov (2007, RTR)	Russia's Space: to the Russian Regions (2007)
He Could Have Been the First: The Drama of Cosmonaut Nelyubov (2007, RTR)	Space Information Systems (2007)
Hydrospace: Dive to Fly Up (2007, Vesti)	NII PM: Accuracy as Priority (2007)
Space Visionary (2007, Perviy Kanal)	GLONASS (2007)
Satellite Instead of Bomb (2007, RTR)	Russia's Space: Launching Into the 21st Century (2007)
The Firegod's Last Love (2008, Perviy Kanal)	TsENKI: Labouring for Space (2007)
Launch No. 100: Union of Titans (2008, Perviy Kanal)	50 Years of Space Age (2007)
Stellar Amazons (2008, RenTV)	30 Years of IPK Mashpribor (2007)
The Call of the Abyss (2009, Perviy Kanal)	Space Navigators (2008, Vesti)
Boris Chertok: A Shot Into the Universe (2009, Perviy Kanal)	Land Launch: The First Lift-Off (2008)
Dreams Come True (2010, Perviy Kanal)	Viktor Kuznetsov's Intelligent Devices (2008, Vesti)
Star Wars General (2010, Rossiya)	The First Space Minister (2008)
The Ghost Train: Kolchak's Treasure Mystery (2010, Rossiya)	TsAGI: Relying on the Intellect (2008)
	Space to Earth (2008, Vesti)
	TsENKI: We Are Responsible for Space on the Ground (2009)
	Space for Humankind (2009)
	Waltzing Soyuzes (2009)
	Russia the Space Power (2009)
	Children and Space (2009)
	Samara the Space (2009)
	Proton: My Destiny (2009)

== Awards ==
For the documentary Hydrocosmos: Dive to Take Off, the film crew of Roscosmos TV-Studio was awarded the Minor Gold Dolphin prize at the VI International Festival of Underwater Shooting Gold Dolphin 2007.

In December 2007, the documentary film He Could Have Been the First: The Drama of Cosmonaut Nelyubov won an international competition and received the national award Lavr (Laurel) for documentary cinematography in the category of "Best Popular Science Film".

In May 2008, Roscosmos TV-Studio's film The White Sun of Baikonur placed third in the "For Faith and Fidelity" category at the 3rd International Television Festival Won Together, which was held from 7 to 12 May 2008 in Sevastopol.

In April 2009, the Roscosmos TV-Studio's website won a prize in the Stars of AstroRunet-2008 contest. It placed third in two categories: Breakthrough of the Year, awarded to the best new website, and Best Official Cosmonautics Related Website, alongside the website of the Russian Mission Control Centre (TsUP-M).

The Roscosmos TV-Studio's documentary Launch No. 100: Union of Titans, directed by Alexey Kitaytsev, received a diploma and the special prize "Fruit of Cognition" at the 4th International Festival of Popular Science Films World of Knowledge, which was held from 19 to 23 October 2009 in Saint-Petersburg.

In April 2010, the Roscosmos TV-Studio's website once again placed third in the Stars of AstroRunet-2009 contest in the category of Best Official Cosmonautics Related Website.

== See also ==
- ESA Television — The European Space Agency's TV channel
