= Progress M-15M =

International Space Station spacecraft

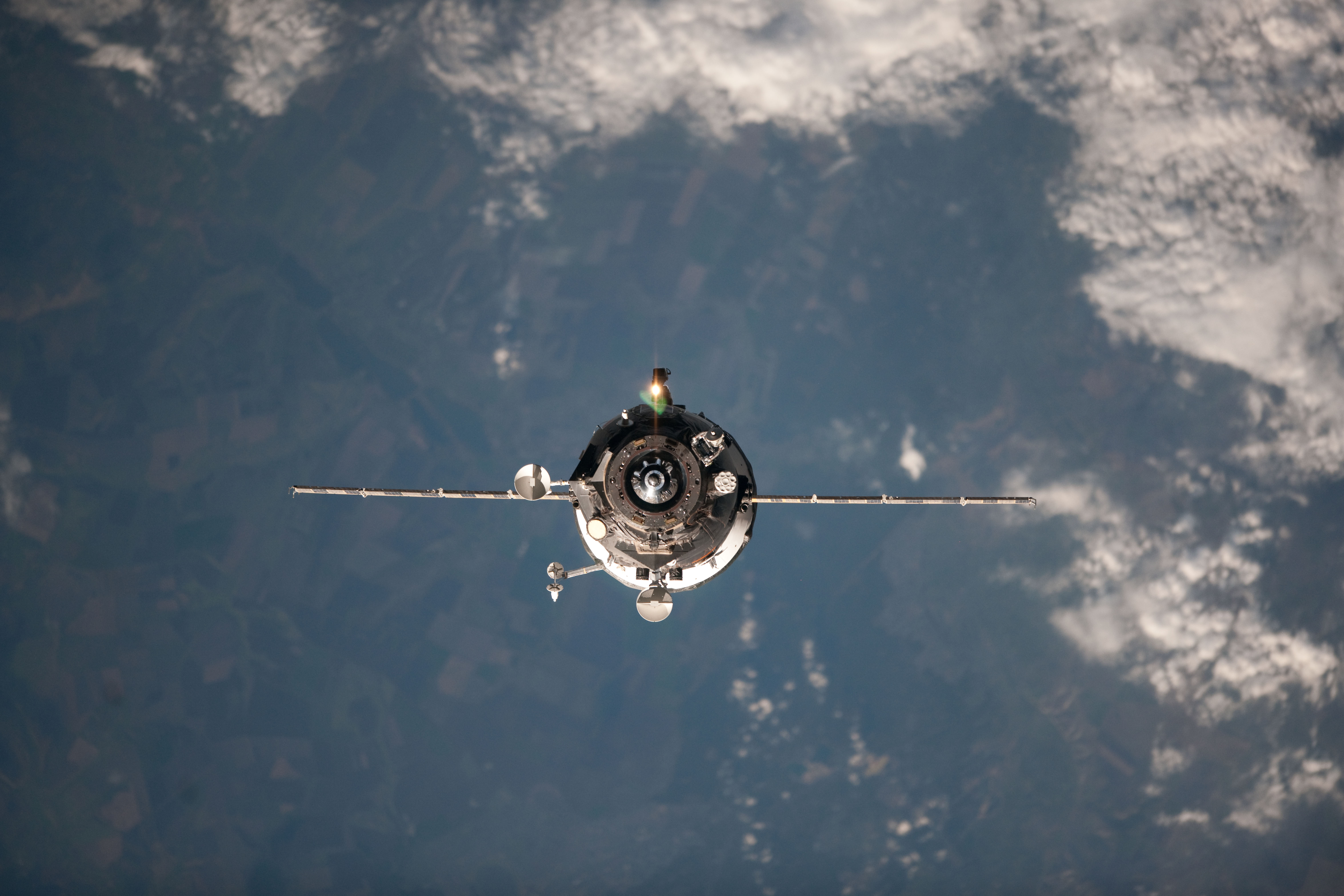
- Progress M-15M approaches the ISS.
- Mission type: ISS resupply
- Operator: Roskosmos
- COSPAR ID: 2012-015A
- SATCAT no.: 38222
- Mission duration: 122 days

Spacecraft properties
- Spacecraft type: Progress-M s/n 415
- Manufacturer: RKK Energia
- Launch mass: 6950 kg

Start of mission
- Launch date: 20 April 2012, 12:50:24 UTC
- Rocket: Soyuz-U
- Launch site: Baikonur, Site 31/6

End of mission
- Disposal: Deorbited
- Decay date: 20 August 2012

Orbital parameters
- Reference system: Geocentric
- Regime: Low Earth
- Perigee altitude: 193.68 km
- Apogee altitude: 245.52 km
- Inclination: 51.66°
- Period: 88.59 minutes
- Epoch: 20 April 2012

Docking with ISS
- Docking port: Pirs
- Docking date: 22 April 2012, 14:40:43 UTC
- Undocking date: 22 July 2012, 20:27 UTC
- Time docked: 91 days

Docking with ISS
- Docking port: Pirs
- Docking date: 29 July 2012, 01:00 UTC
- Undocking date: 30 July 2012, 21:16 UTC
- Time docked: 1 day

Cargo
- Mass: 2356 kg
- Pressurised: 1241 kg
- Fuel: 648 kg
- Gaseous: 47 kg
- Water: 420 kg
- Progress ISS Resupply

Progress M-15M (Russian: Прогресс М-15М), identified by NASA as Progress 47P, is a Progress spacecraft used by Roskosmos to resupply the International Space Station during 2012. The fifteenth Progress-M 11F615A60 spacecraft, it has the serial number 415 and was built by RKK Energia. It arrived at the ISS in late April to deliver supplies to the Expedition 30 crew, and departed the ISS in late July 2012.

It was the 122nd launch to the ISS and the fifth Russian space launch in 2012. It was also the second mission for the Soyuz family of rockets since the beginning of the year.

== Launch ==
The spacecraft was launched on time at 12:50:24 UTC from the Baikonur Cosmodrome in Kazakhstan. Ten minutes after liftoff, the Soyuz-U Rocket carrying Progress M-15M successfully delivered the spacecraft to orbit to begin its International Space Station (ISS) Resupply Mission. Progress M-15M was inserted into a 193.68 x 245.52 km x 51.66° inclination orbit.

== Docking ==
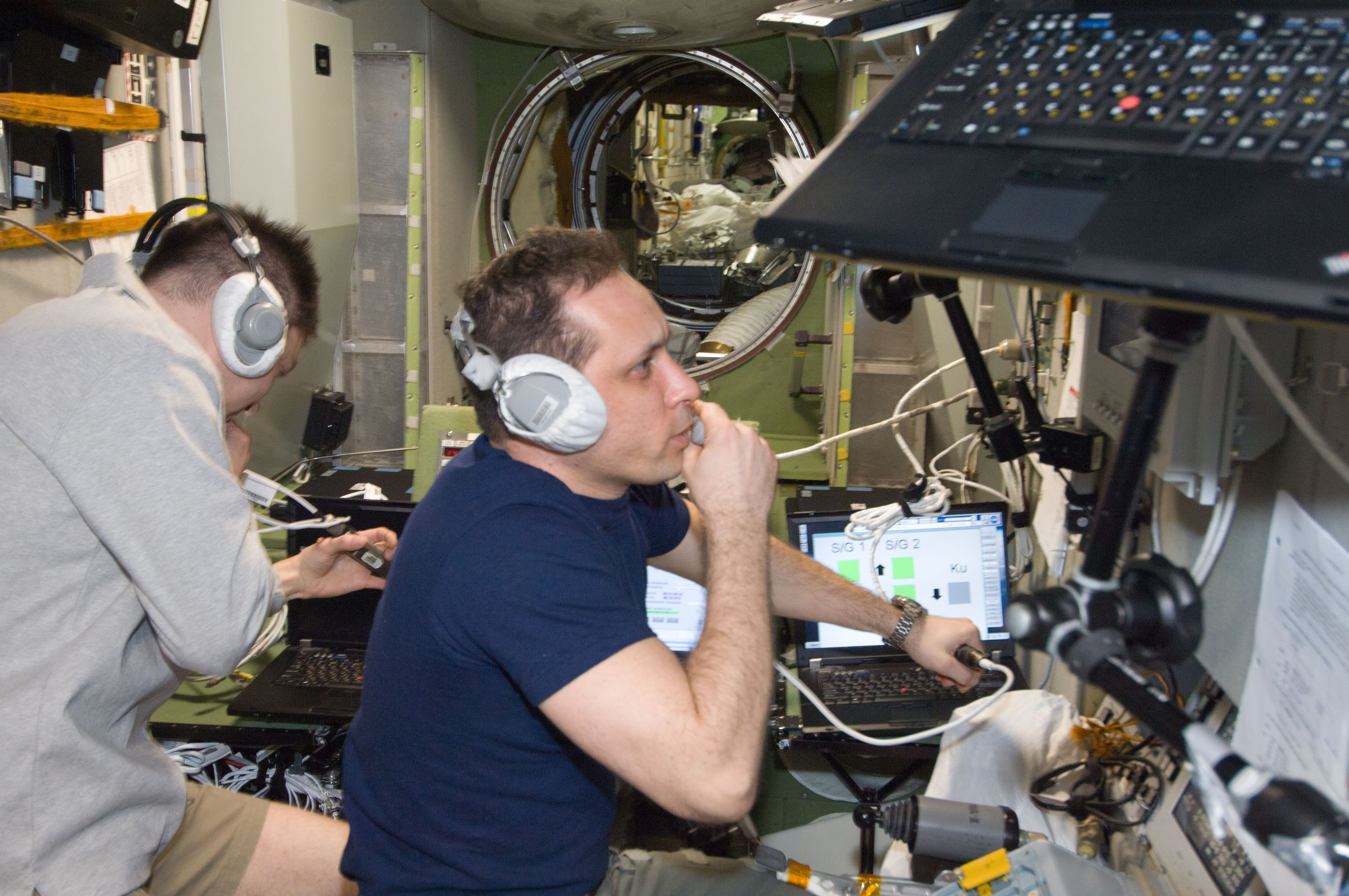
Anton Shkaplerov and Oleg Kononenko monitor data at the TORU controls during the Progress M-15 approach to the ISS.

Five Maneuvers were conducted to refine the orbit of Progress M-15M before rendezvous operations started early on 22 April 2012. Progress M-15M docked with the ISS on 22 April 2012 at 14:39 UTC to the Pirs Docking Compartment nadir port. The port was vacated on 19 April 2012 by Progress M-14M. Fully automated rendezvous and docking operations using the Kurs docking system aboard the ISS and the Progress, drove the spacecraft to the linkup at orbital sunset. During the docking the ISS and Progress M-15M were orbiting 400 km above northern China. Hooks and latches were engaged a few minutes after docking to firmly secure the spacecraft to the ISS. The Expedition 30 crew opened the hatches and entered the Progress later on the day.

== Undocking and decay ==
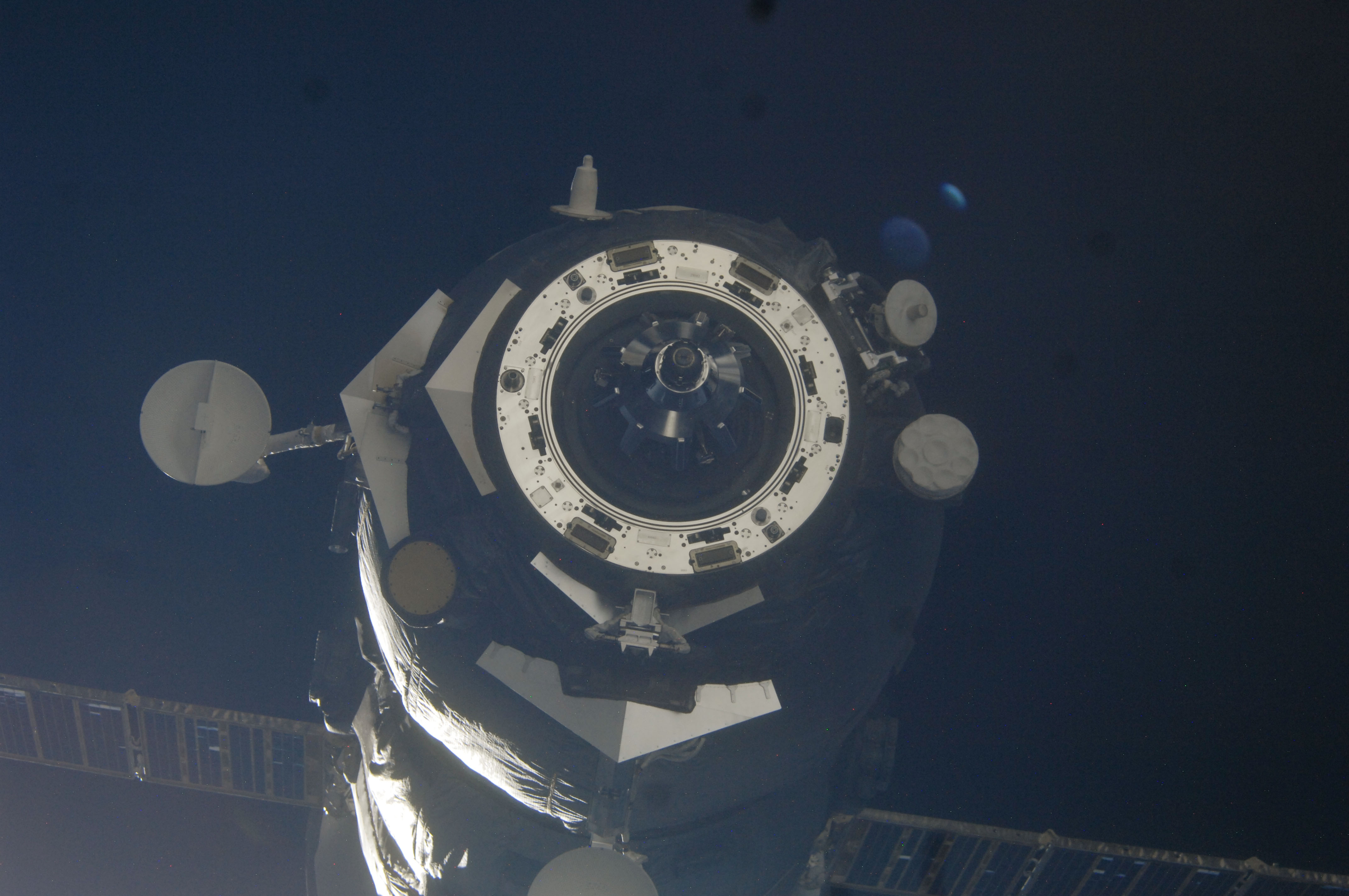
The first undocking on 22 July 2012

The M-15M spacecraft remained docked to the ISS for 91 days. While docked, its cargo will be off loaded to the ISS and be loaded with trash and unwanted items for disposal.

=== Kurs-NA test ===
Kurs is the system used by Progress spacecraft for automated rendezvous and docking with the space station. In addition to its current Kurs-A antennas, Progress M-15M was also fitted with a new antenna system known as Kurs-NA. The first Progress M-15M docking to the space station used the traditional Kurs-A. It was decided as such to ensure that Progress' cargo would not go wasted, should the new Kurs-NA system fail. Kurs-NA system is more power efficient than its predecessor, Kurs-A. It also replaces the function of five existing Kurs-A antennas into one antenna, thus allowing for the removal of four antennas from future Progress and Soyuz spacecraft. Getting rid of these antennas will reduce the risk of a docking failure as some are deployed post-launch and one is retracted prior to docking since it extends forward of the Progress docking interface.

==== First undocking and failed redocking ====
On 22 July 2012, Progress M-15M undocked from the Pirs Docking Compartment and tried to perform a re-rendezvous two days later to test the new Kurs-NA navigation antenna. The undocking from the space station's Pirs compartment occurred around 20:27 UTC. The undocking occurred 410 km over eastern Mongolia. The redocking was scheduled for 01:57 UTC on 24 July 2012. However it was aborted after equipment aboard the Progress spacecraft failed a self-test.

The problem occurred at 01:23 UTC while the KURS-NA system was being activated. The issue forced the spacecraft into a passive abort mode as designed under safety protocols. At the time of the abort ISS and Progress were flying 15 km apart. Two orbits after the abort, Russian flight controllers commanded the automated rendezvous system to re-activate for the collection of data. A second redocking attempt had to be delayed till 28 July 2012 to de-conflict with the arrival of the Japanese Kounotori 3 spacecraft at the ISS on 27 July 2012.

A likely cause for the aborted rendezvous was pointed at lower than expected temperatures on Progress M-15M. As a solution to the issue, Russian engineers turned on all available heaters on the spacecraft, which kept Progress M-15M at a constant 22°, which in turn resulted in Kurs-NA activating successfully, paving the way for the second docking attempt.

==== Second successful dedocking ====
When Kurs-NA was successfully activated at 23:00 UTC on 28 July 2012, it locked on to the passive Kurs-P on the Zvezda service module of the ISS. The re-rendezvous, fly-around and docking to the space station's Pirs compartment successfully occurred at around 01:00 UTC on 29 July 2012. During the time of the docking the ISS and the Progress was flying above the Earth to the west of New Guinea.

=== Final departure from the ISS ===
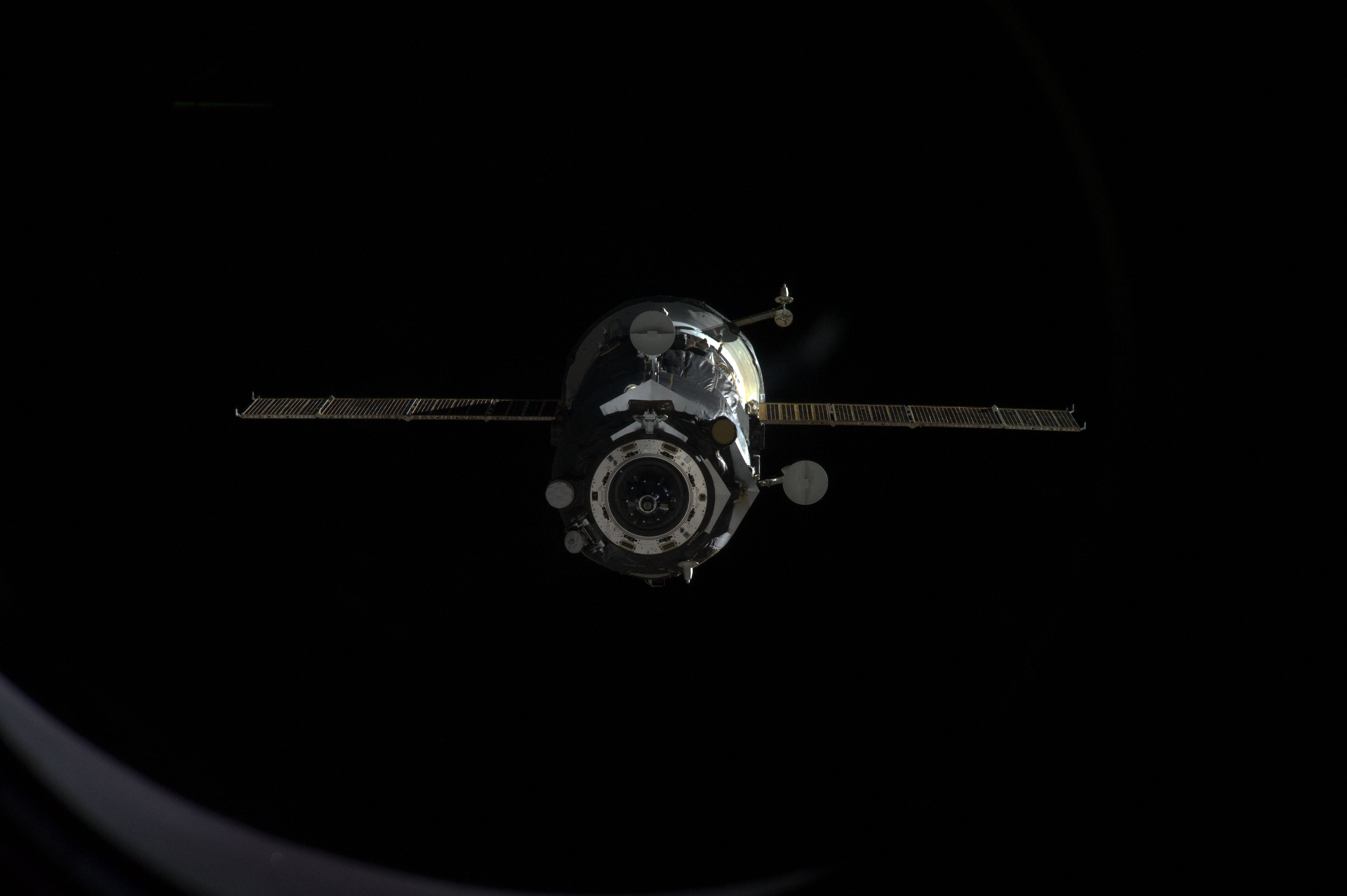
Progress M-15M departs from the space station for the final time on 30 July 2012.

The Progress departed the space station for the second and final time on 30 July 2012 at 21:16 UTC.

=== Experiments ===
Progress M-15M will conduct two experiments: Khlopushka, from 6-14 August 2012, and Radar-Progress, from 15-20 August 2012. At the completion of the Radar-Progress experiment, Progress M-15M will de-orbit for a destructive re-entry over the Pacific Ocean.

== Cargo ==
Progress M-15M was packed with 2703 pounds of equipment, food, clothing, life support system gear (dry cargo), 1988 pounds of propellant to replenish reservoirs that feed the Russian maneuvering thrusters, 926 pounds of water and some 50 kg of oxygen and air.

Among the cargo items inside the Progress, there was a special present for the Russian cosmonaut Gennady Padalka, who arrived at the ISS on 15 May 2012 and is expected to celebrate his 54th birthday in orbit on 21 June 2012.
