= Progress M-13M =

Russian expendable cargo spacecraft

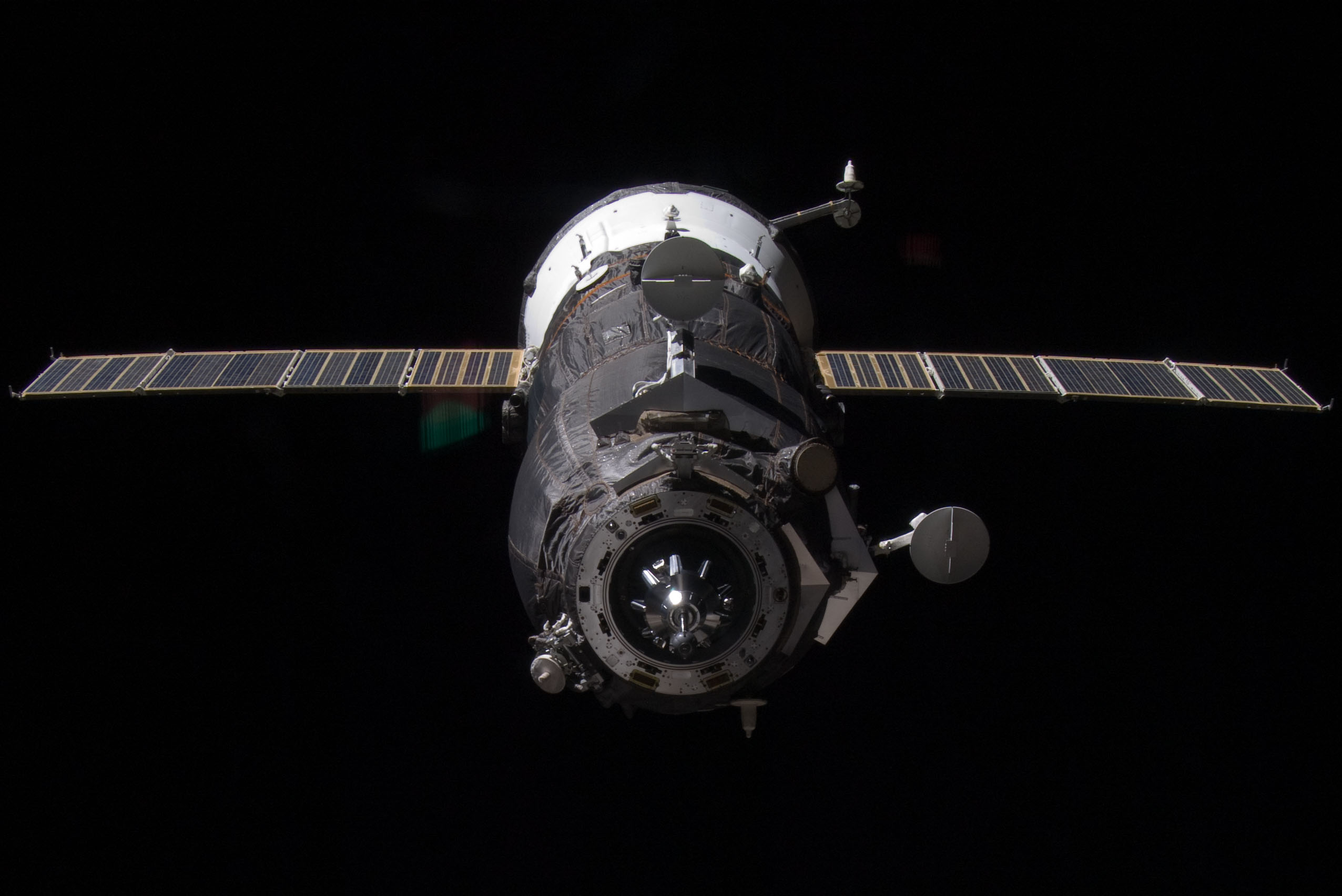
- Progress M-13M approaches the ISS on 2 November 2011.
- Mission type: ISS resupply
- Operator: Roskosmos
- COSPAR ID: 2011-062A
- SATCAT no.: 37857
- Mission duration: 87 days

Spacecraft properties
- Spacecraft type: Progress-M s/n 413
- Manufacturer: RKK Energia

Start of mission
- Launch date: 30 October 2011, 10:11:00 UTC
- Rocket: Soyuz-U
- Launch site: Baikonur, Site 1/5

End of mission
- Disposal: Deorbited
- Decay date: 25 January 2012

Orbital parameters
- Reference system: Geocentric
- Regime: Low Earth
- Inclination: 51.65°
- Epoch: 30 October 2011

Docking with ISS
- Docking port: Pirs nadir
- Docking date: 2 November 2011, 11:41 UTC
- Undocking date: 23 January 2012, 22:10 UTC
- Time docked: 82 days

Cargo
- Mass: 2648 kg
- Pressurised: 1410 kg (dry cargo)
- Fuel: 750 kg
- Gaseous: 50 kg (oxygen)
- Water: 420 kg
- Progress ISS Resupply

Progress M-13M (Russian: Прогресс М-13М), identified by NASA as Progress 45P, is a Progress spacecraft which reached the International Space Station (ISS) on 2 November 2011. The Progress M-13M spacecraft lifted off from the Baikonur Cosmodrome in Kazakhstan at 10:11 UTC on 30 October 2011, starting off the 45th uncrewed Russian space station resupply mission. The spacecraft was manufactured by RKK Energia, and is operated by the Russian Federal Space Agency. The Soyuz-U rocket carrying the cargo ship functioned nominally as advertised. Approximately nine minutes into the launch, Progress M-13M reached its planned preliminary orbit.

== Launch ==
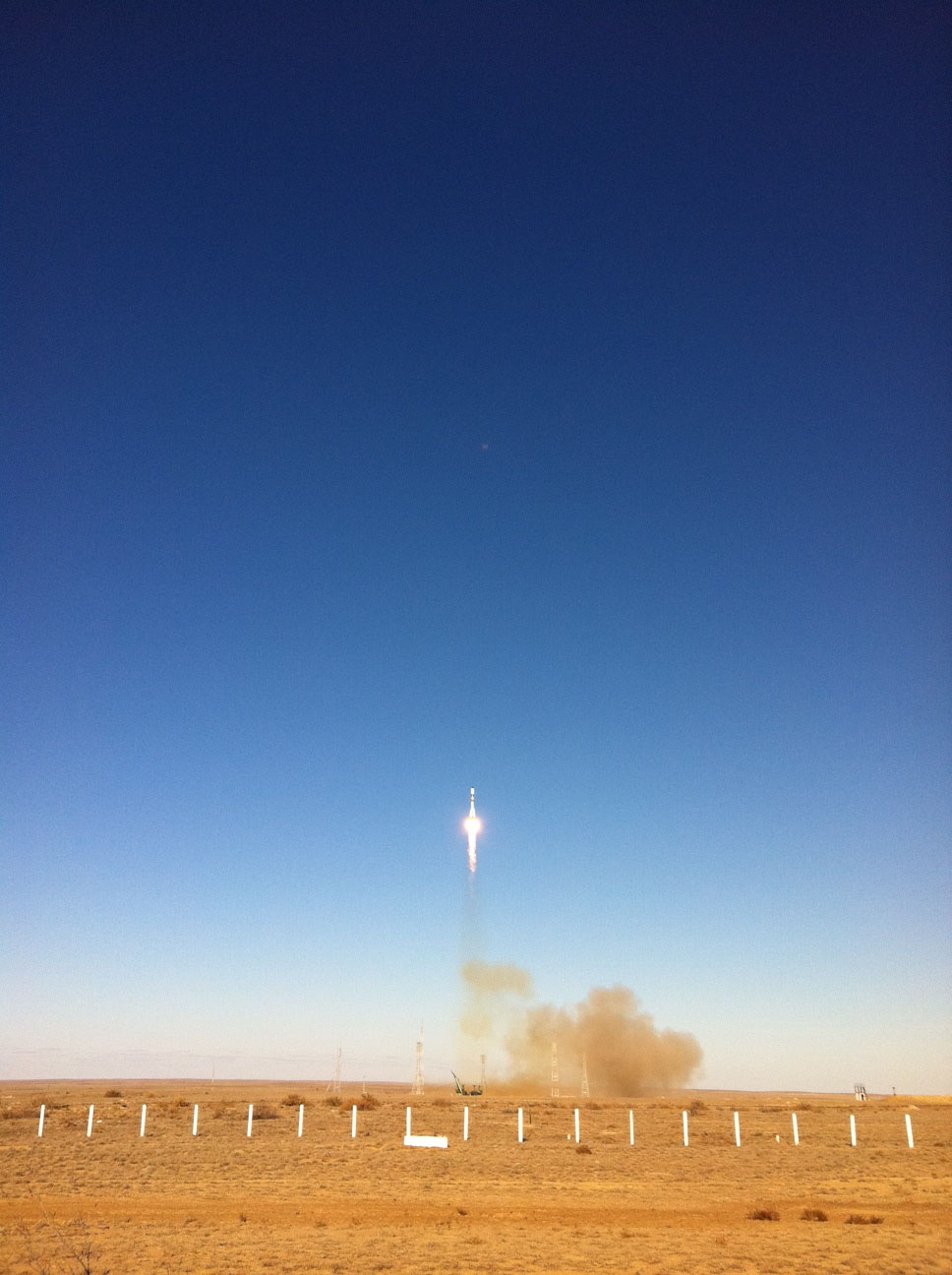
Progress M-13M launches from Baikonur's pad 1 on 30 October 2011.

The launch of the Progress M-13M spacecraft occurred at 10:11 UTC on 30 October 2011. The launch was the first successful Soyuz booster flight to the Space Station since the 24 August 2011 failure of the Soyuz-U booster carrying the Progress M-12M cargo ship. The temperature on the launch day was 4 °C (39 °F). Approximately nine minutes following the liftoff, the Progress M-13M spacecraft successfully reached orbit and deployed its solar arrays and navigation antennas. The spacecraft was inserted into a parking low-Earth orbit with 51.65° of orbital inclination, perigee of 192.98 km minimal altitude, apogee of 252.9 km maximum altitude, 88.66 minutes orbital period.

== Cargo ==
The Progress M-13M spacecraft was packed with 2648 kg of food, fuel and supplies, including 750 kg of propellant, 50 kg of oxygen, 420 kg of water, and 1410 kg of maintenance gear, spare parts and hardware for experiments. It also carried two iPads for personal use by the ISS Russian cosmonauts.

=== Inventory ===
Total cargo mass delivered: 2648 kg

Item description	Mass (kg)
Propellant in the propulsion system tanks for the ISS needs	250
Propellant in the refuelling system tanks	578
Oxygen	50
Water in the Rodnik system tanks	420
Items in the cargo compartment	1350
SOGS gas mixture composition control	15
SVO water supply control	50
SOTR heat exchange control	9
SUBA equipment control	9
SEP electric supply	1
STOR maintenance and repair items	7
Sanitary and hygienic items	125
SIZ Individual protection items	17
Lighting means	7
Food containers, fresh products	316
Medical equipment, linen, personal hygienic and prophylactics items	143
FGB hardware	11
Rassvet hardware	4
"Chibis-M" microsatellite and equipment for scientific experiments "Tipologiya", "Ginseng-2", "Struktura", "Plasma Crystal-3 plus"	51
Onboard documentation, crew parcel, video and photo equipment	24
A special delivery for Russian crewmembers	138
US Orbital Segment hardware	423

== Docking ==
The Progress M-13M rendezvoused with and dock to the ISS at the Nadir port of the Pirs Docking Compartment 2 November 2011 at 11:41 UTC. The spacecraft followed an unusual three days of free flight instead of the usual two. The Pirs nadir port was vacated by the Progress M-10M spacecraft on 29 October 2011, which undocked at 09:04 UTC.

After arriving to the vicinity of the ISS, Progress M-13M began a flyaround maneuver to get lined up with the docking port. It then executed a roll maneuver to properly orient its forward nose probe with the Pirs Docking Compartment. A momentary station keeping hold with about 620 feet (190 m) between the two spacecraft allowed Russian flight controllers at the Moscow Mission Control to check the systems before issuing the approval to begin the 11-minute final approach to the ISS. The automated docking system of the Progress M-13M operated flawlessly and the linkup of Progress M-13M to the Space Station's Pirs docking port occurred just before an orbital sunset while the two spacecraft were orbiting 247 miles (398 km) above northern China.

Following the on time docking, hooks and latches were engaged a few minutes after to secure the cargo ship to the ISS. Narrating about the event, NASA commentator Rob Navias said "On the 11th anniversary of the arrival of the first residents of the International Space Station, supplies have arrived to fortify the station for the Expedition 29 crew and beyond", on NASA TV. The Expedition 29 crew of Michael E. Fossum, Sergey Volkov and Satoshi Furukawa opened the hatches and entered the Progress spacecraft later on the day.

== Undocking and decay ==
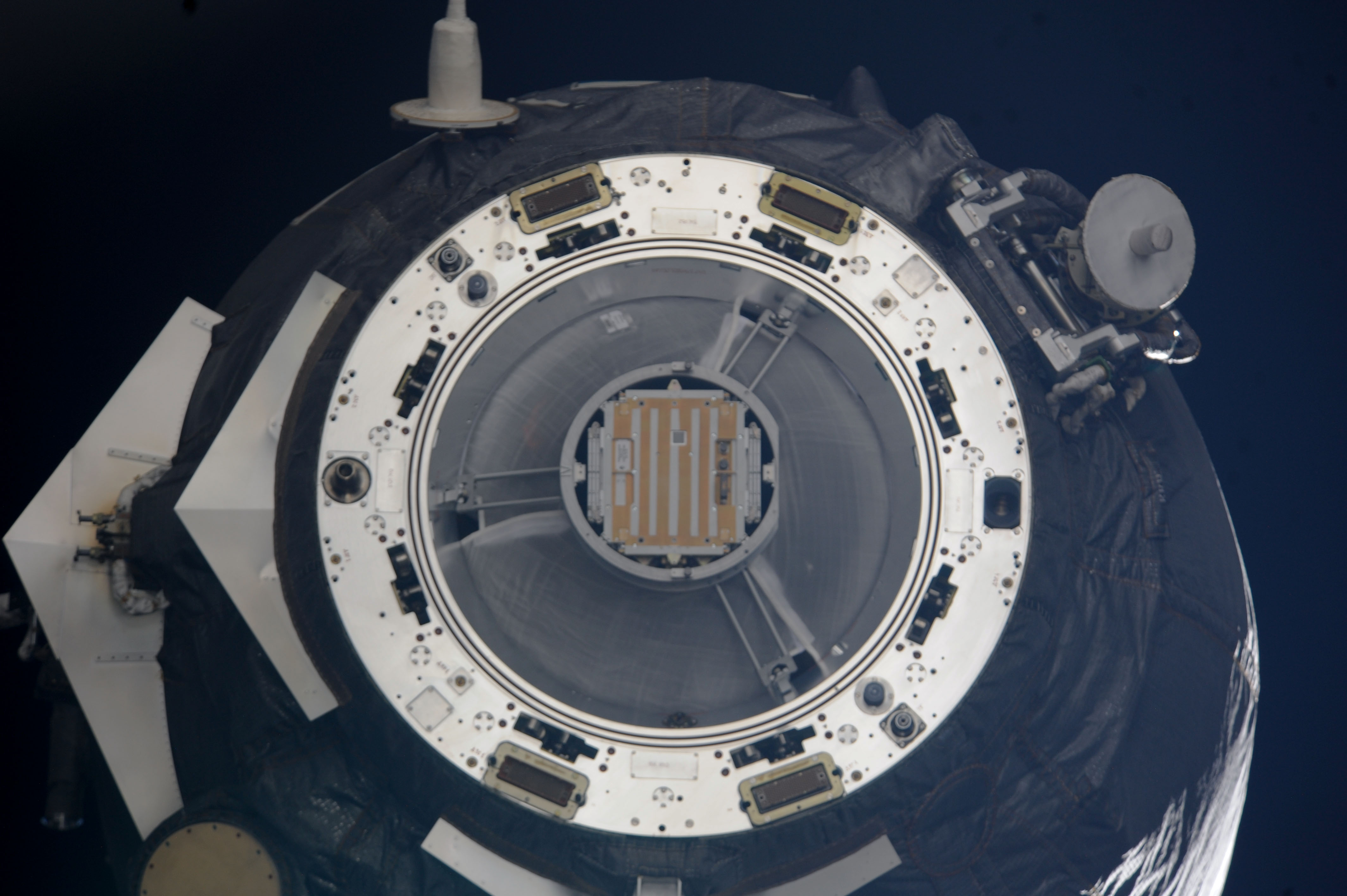
Progress M-13M departs the ISS with the Chibis-M satellite on 23 January 2012.

Progress M-13M remained docked to the Space Station for 82 days. It undocked at 22:10 UTC from Pirs nadir port on 23 January 2012, releasing the Chibis-M satellite which was produced by the Institute of Space Research and the Lebedev Physical Institute (LPI) prior to de-orbiting. Undocking occurred as the ISS crossed into an orbital sunrise 406 kilometres (252 mi) above the Chinese-Russian border. Progress engines performed a pair of posigrade burns later at 01:35 and 02:22 UTC on 24 January 2012. The first burn boosted Progress M-13M by 77.7 mph and the second by 58.7 mph to propel the spacecraft into an orbit more than 60 miles higher than the ISS. From its new altitude, the Progress 13M spacecraft ejected the Chibis-M microsatellite at 23:18 UTC on 24 January 2012.

The 40 kg Chibis-M microsatellite is designed to study gamma radiation in atmospheric lightning. It carries about 12 kg of equipment for the scientific study. Previously, other spacecraft have found that high-altitude thunderstorm are accompanied by powerful pulses of gamma-ray and X-ray and radio pulses of ultrahigh power.

Once the deployment of the Chibis-M microsatellite was successfully accomplished, the mission for Progress M-13M came to an end. The de-orbit braking maneuver for disposal into the South Pacific Ocean was initiated at 02:25 UTC on 25 January 2012 and lasted for three minutes and 56 seconds. The maneuver slowed Progress M-13M by 280 mph to put its trajectory into the atmosphere to burn up. The spacecraft, encountered the upper fringes of the atmosphere at 03:04 UTC and was expected to break up around 03:11 UTC. Any surviving debris was to splash harmlessly into the Pacific Ocean around 03:17 UTC on 25 January 2012. The demise of Progress M-13M in the ocean ended the 86-day, 17-hour voyage that it began with a launch atop a Soyuz booster from Baikonur Cosmodrome in Kazakhstan on 2 November 2011.
