= NASA+ =

Video on demand service by NASA

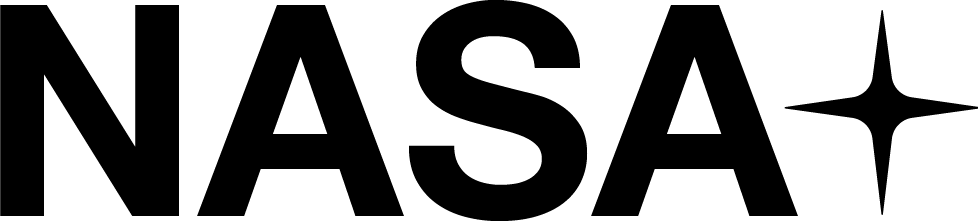

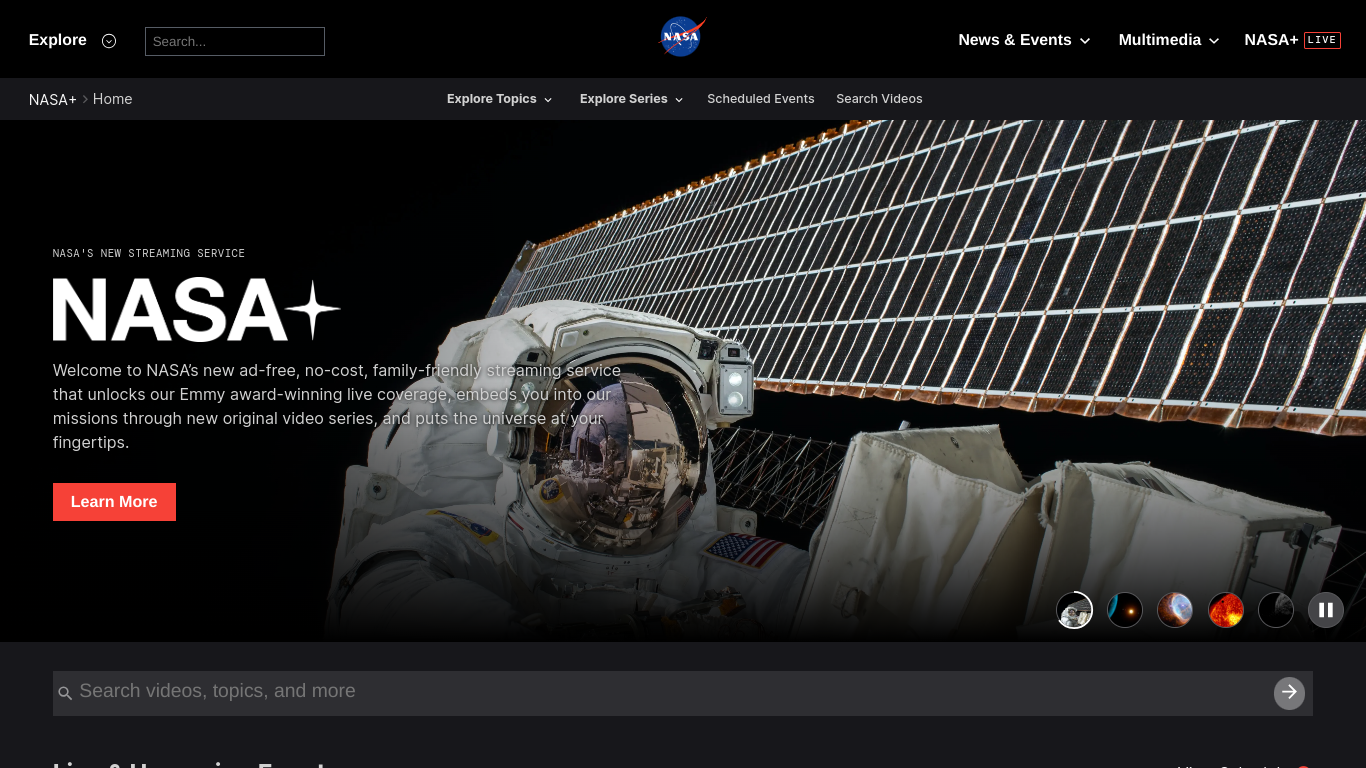
- Website type: Video-on-demand streaming service
- Available in: English
- Owner: NASA
- Website: plus.nasa.gov
- IPv6 support: Yes
- Commercial: No
- Launched: November 8, 2023; 3 years ago
- Current status: Active

NASA+ is an American streaming television service operated by NASA. Launched on November 8, 2023, the service primarily carries video content related to the agency and astronomy, including news, documentary programming, and live streams of NASA activities such as launches and missions.

The service is accessible via the NASA website, as well as apps for mobile platforms and digital media players; it is offered at no cost and is advertising-free. In July 2024, NASA+ succeeded NASA TV as the agency's main broadcasting platform. By that time, the NASA+ streaming app had been downloaded 40 million times. In February 2025, NASA+ began streaming on Twitch, and in August 2025 NASA+ became available through Netflix.

NASA+ won an Emmy Award in the category Outstanding Live News Special for the program titled "2024 Total Solar Eclipse: Through the Eyes of NASA", documenting in real time the solar eclipse of April 8, 2024. The award winners were announced at the 46th News and Documentary Emmy Awards on June 25, 2025.

== History ==
NASA+ was announced to the public in July 2023, and launched on November 8. The platform launched alongside an updated version of NASA's website and apps intended to expand the agency's digital media presence; in addition to the NASA website, NASA+ would be made available via apps on Android, iOS, and various digital media player platforms (including Amazon Fire TV and Roku).

In August 2024, NASA shut down its television network NASA TV, directing its viewers to NASA+. In 2025, NASA began to partner with third-party streaming services to syndicate content from NASA+, including a NASA+ channel for Amazon Prime Video, and an agreement with Netflix to carry NASA+ live events.

== Content ==
Similarly to its linear television predecessor NASA TV, NASA+ primarily carries factual programming relating to astronomy and NASA activities, including live streaming coverage of launches and missions, as well as original documentary-style programming. NASA+ would feature 25 original series at launch, including NASA Explorers (a documentary miniseries chronicling the OSIRIS-REx mission), Other Worlds (a documentary series chronicling discoveries made with the James Webb Space Telescope), and children's programming such as Elmo Visits NASA, Lucy's Journey, and The Traveler. Later series announced in 2024 included Our Alien Earth and Planetary Defenders.

As a service of an independent agency of the US federal government, NASA+ is within the public domain and does not carry commercial advertising.
