= NASA TV =

Television channels of NASA

- Final NASA TV logo
- Country: United States
- Broadcast area: North America, Europe, Middle East, Africa (television); Worldwide (online)
- Headquarters: Washington, D.C.

Programming
- Language: English
- Picture format: 4K (UHDTV); 720p (HDTV); 480i (SDTV)

Ownership
- Owner: NASA

History
- Launched: 1980
- Closed: August 28, 2024
- Former names: NASA Select (1980–1994)

Links
- Website: NASA TV

Availability

Streaming media
- Ustream: NASA Public; NASA Media; Live ISS Stream SD; Live ISS Stream HD
- YouTube: Live streams playlist

NASA TV (originally NASA Select) was the television service of the National Aeronautics and Space Administration (NASA). It was broadcast by satellite with a simulcast over the Internet. Local cable television providers across the United States and amateur television repeaters carried NASA TV at their own discretion, as NASA-created content is considered a work of the U.S. government and is within the public domain. NASA TV was also available via various cable, satellite, and over-the-top media services worldwide. The network was formally created in the early 1980s to provide NASA managers and engineers with real-time video of missions. NASA has operated a television service since the beginning of the space program for archival purposes, and to provide media outlets with video footage.

The network aired a large amount of educational programming and provided live coverage of an array of crewed missions (including the International Space Station), robotic missions, and domestic and international launches. The network completed its conversion from analog to digital transmission in late 2005 following the launch of STS-114, ending a period of dual analog and digital broadcasting. However, some cable television systems may still have transmitted in analog before the U.S. digital television transition. The satellite link used the DVB-S system for transmission.

On July 29, 2024, NASA announced that it would phase out NASA TV in favor of NASA+ due to an increase of viewership on its digital platforms. The linear feeds closed on August 28 of that year, at 11 PM Eastern Daylight Time.

== Channels ==
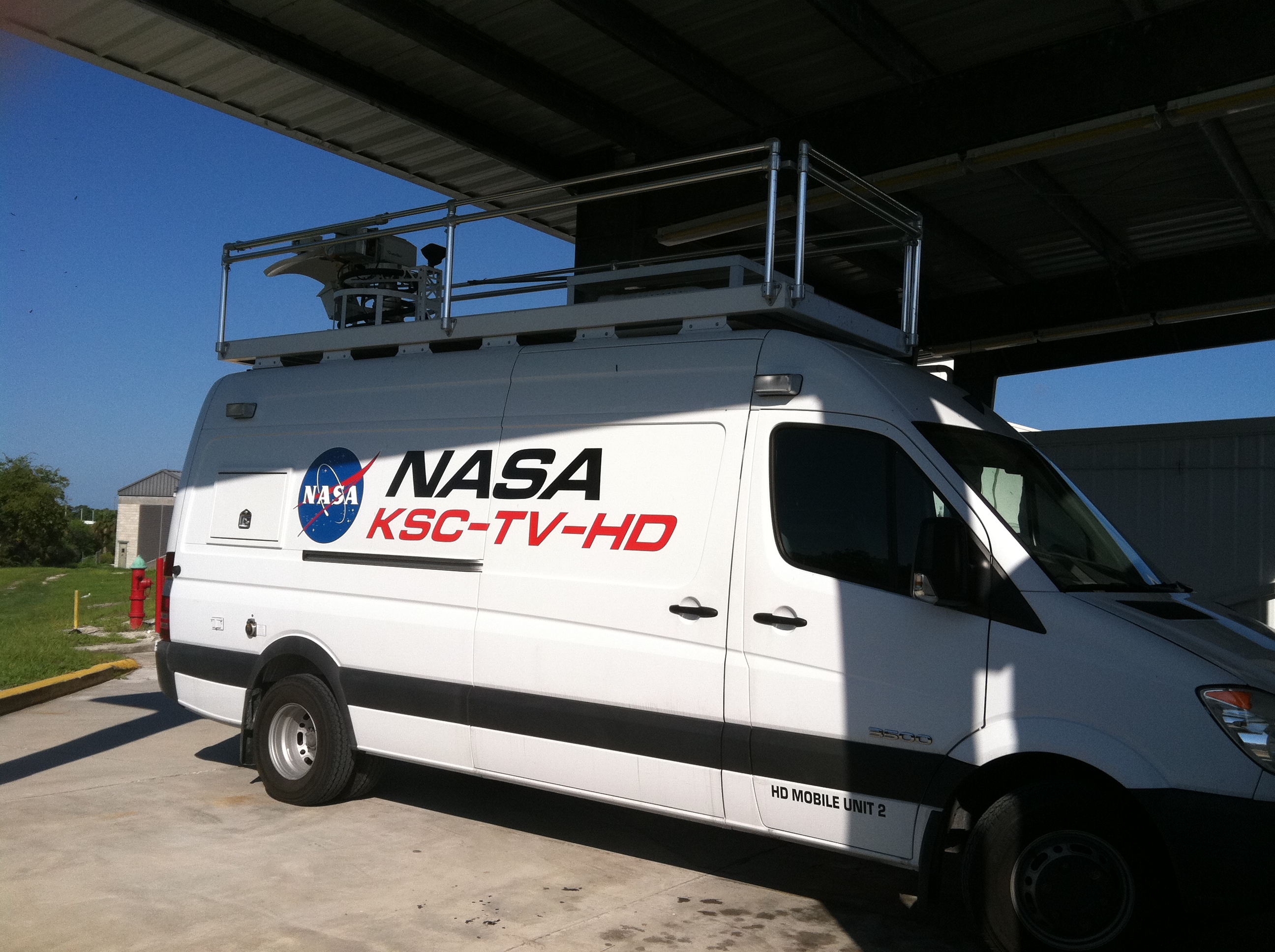
NASA TV broadcasting truck

At the time of closure, NASA TV operated three channels. The "Public Channel" provided 24-hour broadcasting of live and recorded events and documentaries aimed toward the general public, as well as space and science programming for schools, museums, and other educational institutions. The "Media Channel" was dedicated to broadcast news organizations and other members of the press, featuring press release video, interviews, mission press conferences and other services. The final was "NASA TV UHD", an experimental ultra-high-definition television channel created through a Space Act Agreement with Harmonic Inc., featuring content from NASA's archives that takes advantage of the large format, with a musical audio track. A high definition simulcast feed of the "Public Channel" was launched on July 19, 2010. The "Education Channel" was discontinued in 2016, with its programming merged into the main Public Channel. The NASA TV website also provides a channel featuring continuous live footage from inside and outside the ISS, established to celebrate the 10th anniversary of the station in orbit; this feed continues on NASA+.

While NASA distributed NASA TV in high definition, some redistributors, such as Dish Network and DirecTV, downconverted to standard definition before delivering to their customers.

== Programming ==
NASA TV carried various regularly scheduled, pre-recorded educational and public relations programming 24 hours a day on its various channels. Programs included NASA Gallery, which featured photographs and video from NASA's history; Video File, which broadcast b-roll footage for news and media outlets; Education File, which provided special programming for schools; This Week @ NASA, which showed news from NASA centers around the country; and NASA Edge and NASA 360, hosted programs that focused on various projects and activities within NASA. Live ISS coverage and related commentary was aired in hour-long segments throughout the day.

The network also provided an array of live programming, such as ISS events (spacewalks, media interviews, educational broadcasts), press conferences and rocket launches. These often included running commentary by members of the NASA Public Affairs Office who serve as the "voice of Mission Control", including Rob Navias, Nicole Cloutier, Brandi Dean, and formerly, Josh Byerly and the retired George Diller.

== Past issues with Canada's broadcasting authority ==
Before 2007, the Canadian Radio-television and Telecommunications Commission (CRTC) prohibited NASA TV from being aired by local satellite and cable providers within Canada, except for specific broadcast events. Under existing CRTC rules, a cable or satellite provider had to offer a minimum amount of Canadian content from domestic Canadian companies, and the only involvement the equivalent Canadian Space Agency had with space missions involved shared American space shuttle missions at the time, along with the Canadarms. Additionally, CRTC stated in September 2000 that there simply was not enough room left under the analog television frequency allocation plan, and standards for dealing with foreign digital television signals had not been finalized. On April 20, 2007, the Commission issued a notice stating that after receiving an initial request from Mountain Cablevision and support from other Canadian broadcasters and members of the public, NASA TV had been added to the list of foreign television channels available in Canada.

== Broadcast partnerships ==
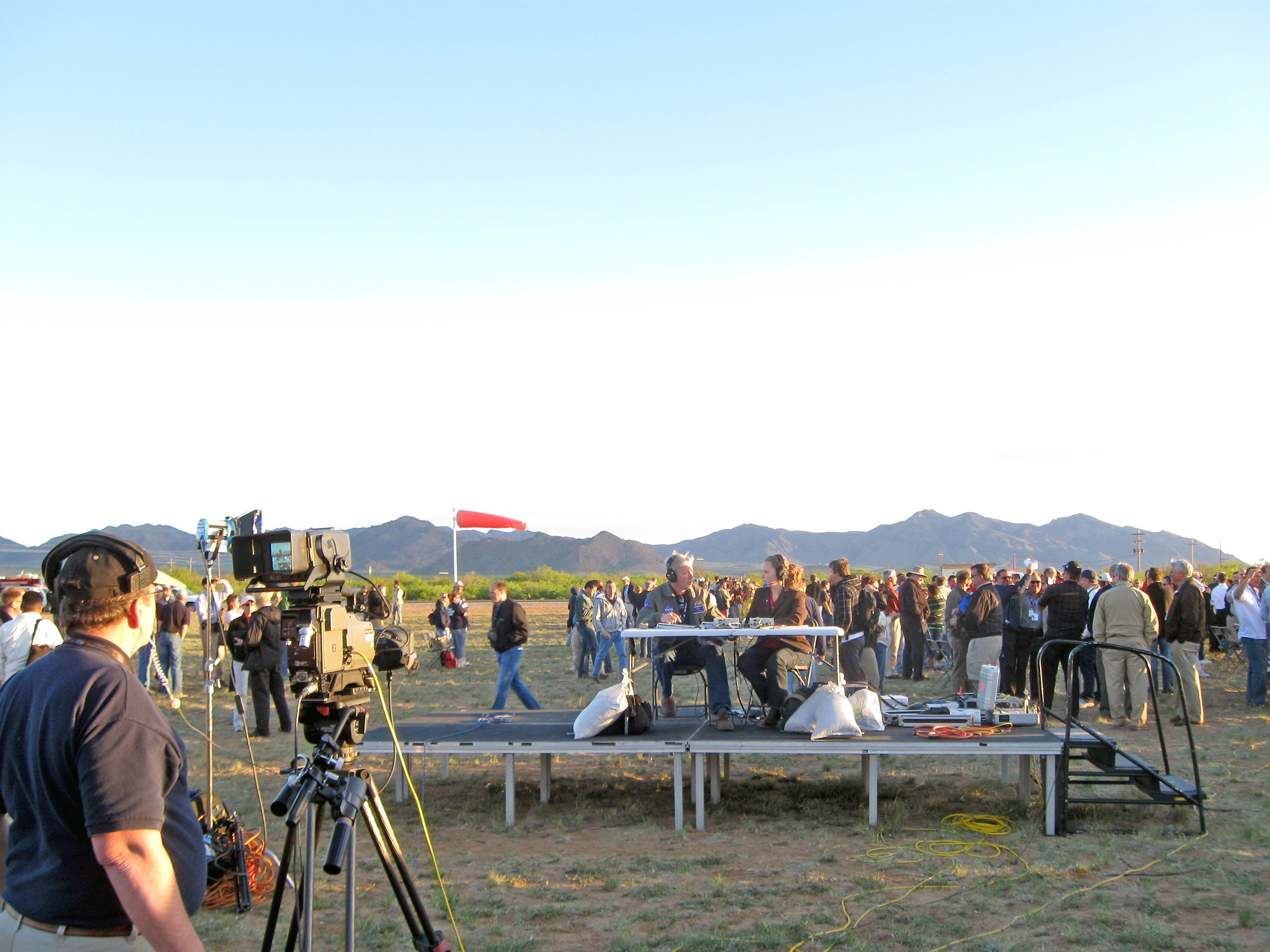
NASA TV broadcasting live from White Sands Missile Range in 2010.

NASA has used external companies to provide streaming services for online viewers, both embedded into NASA's website and through streams branded by those companies. The variety of stream formats used have varied with the available technology and with the popularity of formats, including RealMedia, QuickTime, Windows Media, Flash Video and H.264.

In July 2005, NASA entered into an agreement with Yahoo! and Akamai Technologies to provide streaming services for NASA TV ahead of the STS-114 mission and associated Return to Flight program after the Space Shuttle Columbia disaster. As of 2011, NASA has entered agreements with Ustream to provide high definition streaming of NASA TV and high definition cameras aboard the International Space Station, along with mission audio. Archives of press conferences, NASA Social events, and other events are also made available via UStream. Other NASA TV programs and events are archived via the NASA TV YouTube channel.

In July 2023, NASA announced that it would form a new streaming platform known as NASA+, accessible via the agency's mobile apps and apps for digital media player platforms such as Apple TV and Roku.

== Broadcast television affiliates ==
As NASA TV is a service of the federal government of the United States, its programming is considered in the public domain for any organization or person to use as they see fit; for instance the paid programming network LifehacksDRTV and WMGM-TV uses NASA TV's educational blocks to fulfill their FCC E/I requirements for their individual station or network affiliates. A list of known rebroadcasters is available on the website RabbitEars.

== Awards ==
In 2009, NASA TV received two Emmy Awards. On January 24, the Midsouth Chapter of the Academy of Television Arts & Sciences awarded NASA TV and the Marshall Space Flight Center with the Governor's Award for Lifetime Achievement in recognition of NASA's 50th anniversary. On August 22, NASA TV was awarded a national Primetime Emmy Award, the Philo T. Farnsworth Award, for engineering excellence in recognition of the 40th anniversary of Apollo 11's first television broadcast from the surface of the Moon.

== Closure ==
In July 2023, NASA announced NASA+, an on-demand streaming service that runs content similar to NASA TV. NASA TV ran parallel to NASA+ until July 29, 2024, when NASA announced NASA TV would cease operations on August 28. On August 26, 2024, NASA TV's final schedule was released, with the linear channel's final program scheduled to be "Artemis I: The Documentary".

== See also ==
- ESA Television, the European Space Agency's television service
- TV Roskosmos, the Roscosmos State Corporation's television service
- TLC, co-founded and operated by NASA in the 1970s before being privatized in 1980
