= List of R-7 launches (2005–2009) =

This is a list of launches made by the R-7 Semyorka ICBM and its derivatives between 2005 and 2009. All launches are orbital satellite launches, unless stated otherwise.

Date and time (UTC)	Configuration	Serial number	Launch site	Result	Payload	Remarks
== 2005 ==
28 February 2005, 19:09	Soyuz-U (11A511U)		LC-1/5, Baikonur	Success	Progress M-52 (17P)	ISS Logistics
15 April 2005, 00:46	Soyuz-FG (11A511U-FG)	Zh15000-014	LC-1/5, Baikonur	Success	Soyuz TMA-6	Crewed flight with 3 Cosmonauts; ISS Expedition 11
31 May 2005, 12:00	Soyuz-U (11A511U)		LC-1/5, Baikonur	Success	Foton-M2	
16 June 2005, 23:09	Soyuz-U (11A511U)		LC-1/5, Baikonur	Success	Progress M-53 (18P)	ISS Logistics
21 June 2005, 00:49	Molniya-M (8K78M)		LC-16/2, Plesetsk	Failure	Molniya-3K	Racing fuel regulator in Blok A results in premature propellant depletion, pump overspeed, and engine destruction which resulted in failure of Blok I staging. Blok I starts with the Blok A still attached, resulting in improper flight trajectory and automatic shutoff command T+298 seconds.
13 August 2005, 23:28	Soyuz-FG / Fregat (11A511U-FG)	Zh15000-011/ ST-13	LC-31/6, Baikonur	Success	Galaxy 14	Communications satellite
2 September 2005, 09:50	Soyuz-U (11A511U)		LC-1/5, Baikonur	Success	Kosmos 2415	
8 September 2005, 13:08	Soyuz-U (11A511U)		LC-1/5, Baikonur	Success	Progress M-54 (19P)	ISS Logistics
8 September 2005, 13:08	Soyuz-U (11A511U)		LC-1/5, Baikonur	Success	RadioSkaf	
1 October 2005, 03:54	Soyuz-FG (11A511U-FG)	Zh15000-017	LC-1/5, Baikonur	Success	Soyuz TMA-7	Crewed flight with 3 Cosmonauts; ISS Expedition 12
9 November 2005, 03:33	Soyuz-FG / Fregat (11A511U-FG)	Zh15000-010/ ST-14	LC-31/6, Baikonur	Success	Venus Express	Venus orbiter
21 December 2005, 18:38	Soyuz-U (11A511U)		LC-1/5, Baikonur	Success	Progress M-55 (20P)	ISS Logistics
28 December 2005, 05:19	Soyuz-FG / Fregat (11A511U-FG)	Zh15000-016/ ST-15	LC-31/6, Baikonur	Success	GIOVE-A	Navigation satellite
== 2006 ==
30 March 2006, 02:30	Soyuz-FG (11A511U-FG)	P15000-018	LC-1/5, Baikonur	Success	Soyuz TMA-8	Crewed flight with 3 Cosmonauts; ISS Expedition 13
24 April 2006, 16:03	Soyuz-U (11A511U)		LC-1/5, Baikonur	Success	Progress M-56 (21P)	ISS Logistics
3 May 2006, 17:38	Soyuz-U (11A511U)		LC-16/2, Plesetsk	Success	Kosmos 2420	
15 June 2006, 08:00	Soyuz-U (11A511U)		LC-1/5, Baikonur	Success	Resurs	
24 June 2006, 15:08	Soyuz-U (11A511U)		LC-1/5, Baikonur	Success	Progress M-57 (22P)	ISS Logistics
21 July 2006, 04:20	Molniya-M (8K78M)		LC-16/2, Plesetsk	Success	Kosmos 2422 (Oko)	
14 September 2006, 13:41	Soyuz-U (11A511U)		LC-31/6, Baikonur	Success	Kosmos 2423 (Don)	
18 September 2006, 04:08	Soyuz-FG (11A511U-FG)	?15000-023	LC-1/5, Baikonur	Success	Soyuz TMA-9	Crewed flight with 3 Cosmonauts; ISS Expedition 14
19 October 2006, 17:28	Soyuz-2.1a / Fregat (14A14A)	ST-16	LC-31/6, Baikonur	Success	MetOp-A	Weather satellite
23 October 2006, 13:41	Soyuz-U (11A511U)		LC-1/5, Baikonur	Success	Progress M-58 (23P)	ISS Logistics
24 December 2006, 08:34	Soyuz-2.1a / Fregat (14A14A)		LC-43/4, Plesetsk	Success	Meridian	Communications satellite
27 December 2006, 14:23	Soyuz-2.1b / Fregat (14A14B)	ST-17	LC-31/6, Baikonur	Success	CoRoT	Astronomy satellite Maiden flight of Soyuz-2.1b 14A14B
== 2007 ==
18 January 2007, 02:12	Soyuz-U (11A511U)		LC-1/5, Baikonur	Success	Progress M-59 (24P)	ISS Logistics
7 April 2007, 17:31	Soyuz-FG (11A511U-FG)		LC-1/5, Baikonur	Success	Soyuz TMA-10	Crewed flight with 3 Cosmonauts; ISS Expedition 15
12 May 2007, 03:25:38	Soyuz-U (11A511U)		LC-1/5, Baikonur	Success	Progress M-60 (25P)	ISS Logistics
29 May 2007, 20:31	Soyuz-FG / Fregat (11A511U-FG)	ST-18	LC-31/6, Baikonur	Success	Globalstar 65	Comsat
29 May 2007, 20:31	Soyuz-FG / Fregat (11A511U-FG)	ST-18	LC-31/6, Baikonur	Success	Globalstar 69	Comsat
29 May 2007, 20:31	Soyuz-FG / Fregat (11A511U-FG)	ST-18	LC-31/6, Baikonur	Success	Globalstar 71	Comsat
29 May 2007, 20:31	Soyuz-FG / Fregat (11A511U-FG)	ST-18	LC-31/6, Baikonur	Success	Globalstar 72	Comsat
7 June 2007, 18:00	Soyuz-U (11A511U)		LC-16/2, Plesetsk	Success	Kosmos 2427 (Kobal't-M)	Reconnaissance spacecraft
2 August 2007, 17:33:48	Soyuz-U (11A511U)		LC-1/5, Baikonur	Success	Progress M-61 (26P)	ISS Logistics
14 September 2007, 11:00	Soyuz-U (11A511U)		LC-1/5, Baikonur	Success	Foton-M3 / YES2	Biological research
10 October 2007, 13:22	Soyuz-FG (11A511U-FG)		LC-1/5, Baikonur	Success	Soyuz TMA-11	Crewed flight with 3 Cosmonauts; ISS Expedition 16
20 October 2007, 20:12	Soyuz-FG / Fregat (11A511U-FG)	ST-19	LC-31/6, Baikonur	Success	Globalstar 66	Comsat
20 October 2007, 20:12	Soyuz-FG / Fregat (11A511U-FG)	ST-19	LC-31/6, Baikonur	Success	Globalstar 67	Comsat
20 October 2007, 20:12	Soyuz-FG / Fregat (11A511U-FG)	ST-19	LC-31/6, Baikonur	Success	Globalstar 68	Comsat
20 October 2007, 20:12	Soyuz-FG / Fregat (11A511U-FG)	ST-19	LC-31/6, Baikonur	Success	Globalstar 70	Comsat
23 October 2007, 04:39	Molniya-M / 2BL (8K78M/2BL)		LC-16/2, Plesetsk	Success	Kosmos 2430 (Oko-88)	Missile defence spacecraft
14 December 2007, 13:17:34	Soyuz-FG / Fregat (11A511U-FG)	ST-20	LC-31/6, Baikonur	Success	RADARSAT-2	Radar imaging spacecraft
23 December 2007, 07:12:41	Soyuz-U (11A511U)		LC-1/5, Baikonur	Success	Progress M-62 (27P)	ISS Logistics
== 2008 ==
5 February 2008, 13:02:54	Soyuz-U (11A511U)		LC-1/5, Baikonur	Success	Progress M-63 (28P)	ISS Logistics
8 April 2008, 11:16:39	Soyuz-FG (11A511U-FG)	Sh15000-024	LC-1/5, Baikonur	Success	Soyuz TMA-12	Crewed flight with 3 Cosmonauts; ISS Expedition 17
26 April 2008, 22:16:02	Soyuz-FG / Fregat (11A511U-FG)	ST-21	LC-31/6, Baikonur	Success	GIOVE-B	Navigation satellite
14 May 2008, 20:22:54	Soyuz-U (11A511U)		LC-1/5, Baikonur	Success	Progress M-64 (29P)	ISS Logistics
26 July 2008, 18:31	Soyuz-2.1b (14A14B)		LC-43/4, Plesetsk	Success	Kosmos 2441 (Persona)	Reconnaissance spacecraft
10 September 2008, 19:50:02	Soyuz-U (11A511U)		LC-1/5, Baikonur	Success	Progress M-65 (30P)	ISS Logistics
12 October 2008, 07:01	Soyuz-FG (11A511U-FG)		LC-1/5, Baikonur	Success	Soyuz TMA-13	Crewed flight with 3 Cosmonauts; ISS Expedition 18
14 November 2008, 15:50	Soyuz-U (11A511U)		LC-16/2, Plesetsk	Success	Kosmos 2445 (Kobal't-M)	
26 November 2008, 12:38	Soyuz-U (11A511U)		LC-1/5, Baikonur	Success	Progress M-01M (31P)	ISS Logistics
2 December 2008, 05:00	Molniya-M / 2BL (8K78M/2BL)		LC-16/2, Plesetsk	Success	Kosmos 2446 (Oko)	Missile defence spacecraft
== 2009 ==
10 February 2009, 05:49	Soyuz-U (11A511U)		LC-31/6, Baikonur	Success	Progress M-66 (32P)	ISS Logistics
26 March 2009, 11:49	Soyuz-FG (11A511U-FG)		LC-1/5, Baikonur	Success	Soyuz TMA-14	Crewed flight with 3 Cosmonauts; ISS Expedition 19
29 April 2009, 16:58	Soyuz-U (11A511U)		LC-16/2, Plesetsk	Success	Kosmos 2450 (Kobal't-M)	
7 May 2009, 18:37	Soyuz-U (11A511U)		LC-1/5, Baikonur	Success	Progress M-02M (33P)	ISS Logistics
21 May 2009, 21:53	Soyuz-2.1a / Fregat (14A14A)		LC-43/4, Plesetsk	Partial failure	Meridian 2	Second stage shut down five seconds early, Fregat ran out of fuel during second burn while trying to compensate. The satellite never reached a usable orbit.
27 May 2009, 10:34	Soyuz-FG (11A511U-FG)		LC-1/5, Baikonur	Success	Soyuz TMA-15	Crewed flight with 3 Cosmonauts; ISS Expedition 20
24 July 2009, 10:56	Soyuz-U (11A511U)		LC-1/5, Baikonur	Success	Progress M-67 (34P)	ISS Logistics
15 September 2009, 15:55	Soyuz-2.1b / Fregat (14A14B)		LC-31/6, Baikonur	Success	Meteor M-1	Weather satellite
15 September 2009, 15:55	Soyuz-2.1b / Fregat (14A14B)		LC-31/6, Baikonur	Success	Universitetsky-2	Technology development
15 September 2009, 15:55	Soyuz-2.1b / Fregat (14A14B)		LC-31/6, Baikonur	Success	Sterkh-2	Comsat
15 September 2009, 15:55	Soyuz-2.1b / Fregat (14A14B)		LC-31/6, Baikonur	Success	IRIS	
15 September 2009, 15:55	Soyuz-2.1b / Fregat (14A14B)		LC-31/6, Baikonur	Success	UGATUSAT	Earth observation
15 September 2009, 15:55	Soyuz-2.1b / Fregat (14A14B)		LC-31/6, Baikonur	Success	SumbandilaSat	Technology development
15 September 2009, 15:55	Soyuz-2.1b / Fregat (14A14B)		LC-31/6, Baikonur	Success	BLITS	Radar calibration
30 September 2009, 07:14	Soyuz-FG (11A511U-FG)		LC-1/5, Baikonur	Success	Soyuz TMA-16	Crewed flight with 3 Cosmonauts; ISS Expedition 21
15 October 2009, 01:14	Soyuz-U (11A511U)		LC-1/5, Baikonur	Success	Progress M-03M (35P)	ISS Logistics
10 November 2009, 14:22	Soyuz-U (11A511U)		LC-1/5, Baikonur	Success	Progress M-MIM2	ISS assembly flight
10 November 2009, 14:22	Soyuz-U (11A511U)		LC-1/5, Baikonur	Success	MRM-2 (Poisk)	ISS module
20 November 2009, 10:44	Soyuz-U (11A511U)		LC-16/2, Plesetsk	Success	Kosmos 2455 (Lotos-S)	
20 December 2009, 21:52	Soyuz-FG (11A511U-FG)		LC-1/5, Baikonur	Success	Soyuz TMA-17	Crewed flight with 3 cosmonauts ISS Expedition 22
