= Progress MS-37 =

Russian resupply spaceflight to the ISS

- Names: Progress 98; ISS 98P
- Mission type: ISS resupply
- Operator: Roscosmos

Spacecraft properties
- Spacecraft: Progress MS-37 No. 463
- Spacecraft type: Progress MS
- Manufacturer: Energia
- Launch mass: 7,280 kg (16,050 lb)

Start of mission
- Launch date: February 2027 (planned)
- Rocket: Soyuz-2.1a
- Launch site: Baikonur, Site 31/6
- Contractor: RKTs Progress

End of mission
- Disposal: Deorbited (planned)

Orbital parameters
- Reference system: Geocentric orbit
- Regime: Low Earth orbit
- Inclination: 51.65°

Docking with ISS
- Docking port: Poisk aft

Progress MS-37 (Russian: Прогресс МC-37), Russian production No. 463, identified by NASA as Progress 98, is a Progress cargo spacecraft mission by Roscosmos to resupply the International Space Station (ISS).
