= Uncrewed spaceflights to the International Space Station =

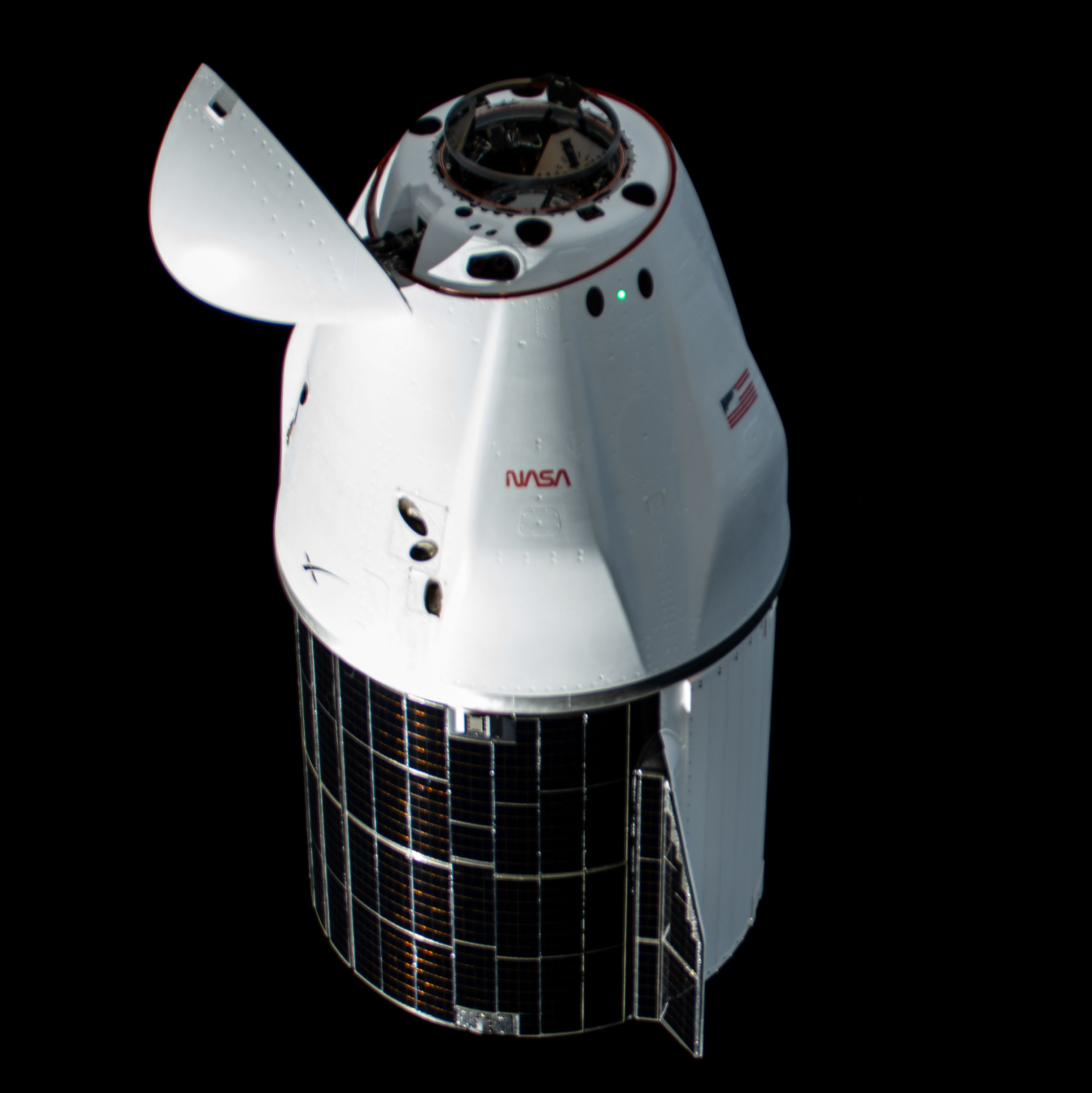
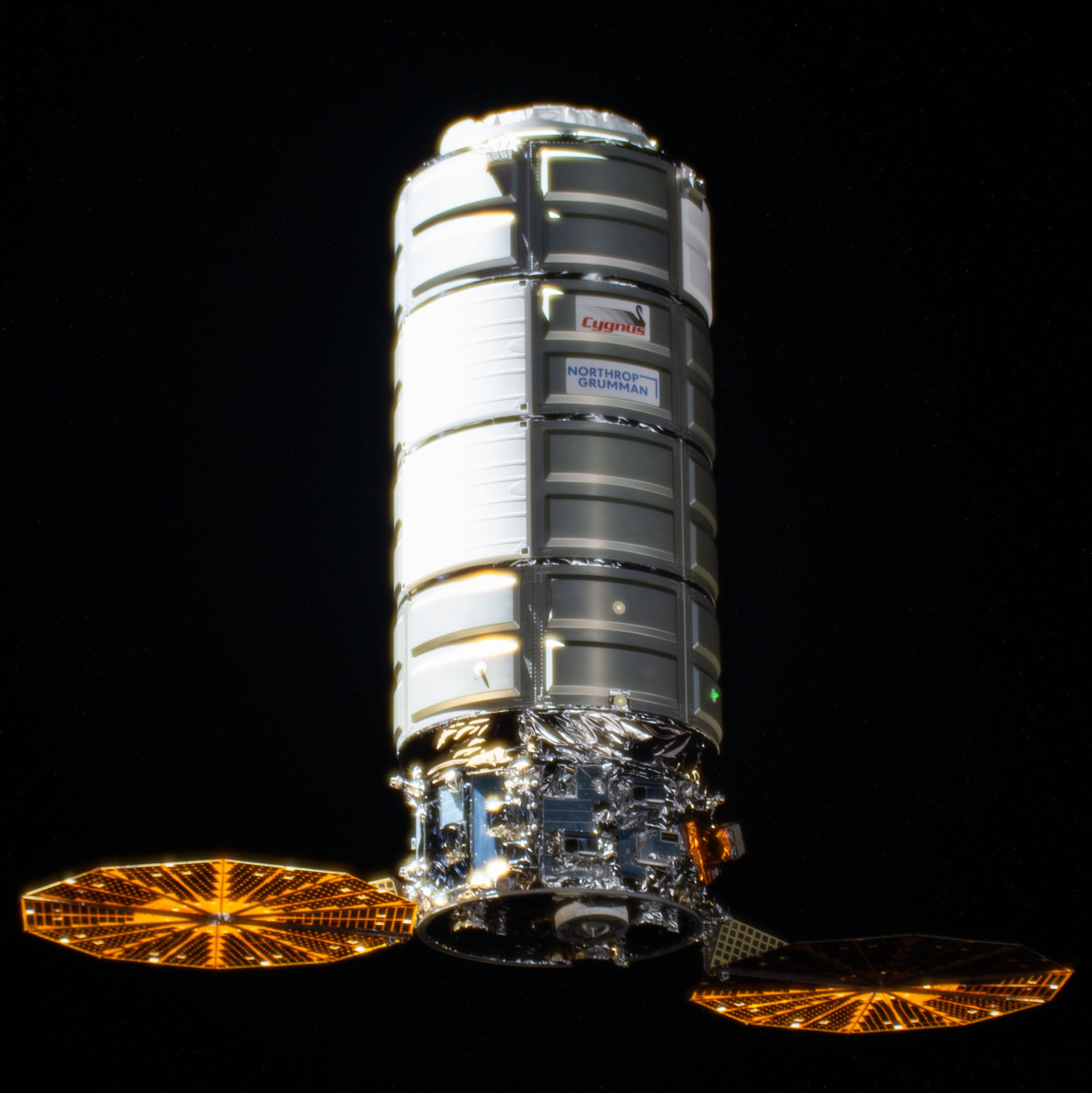
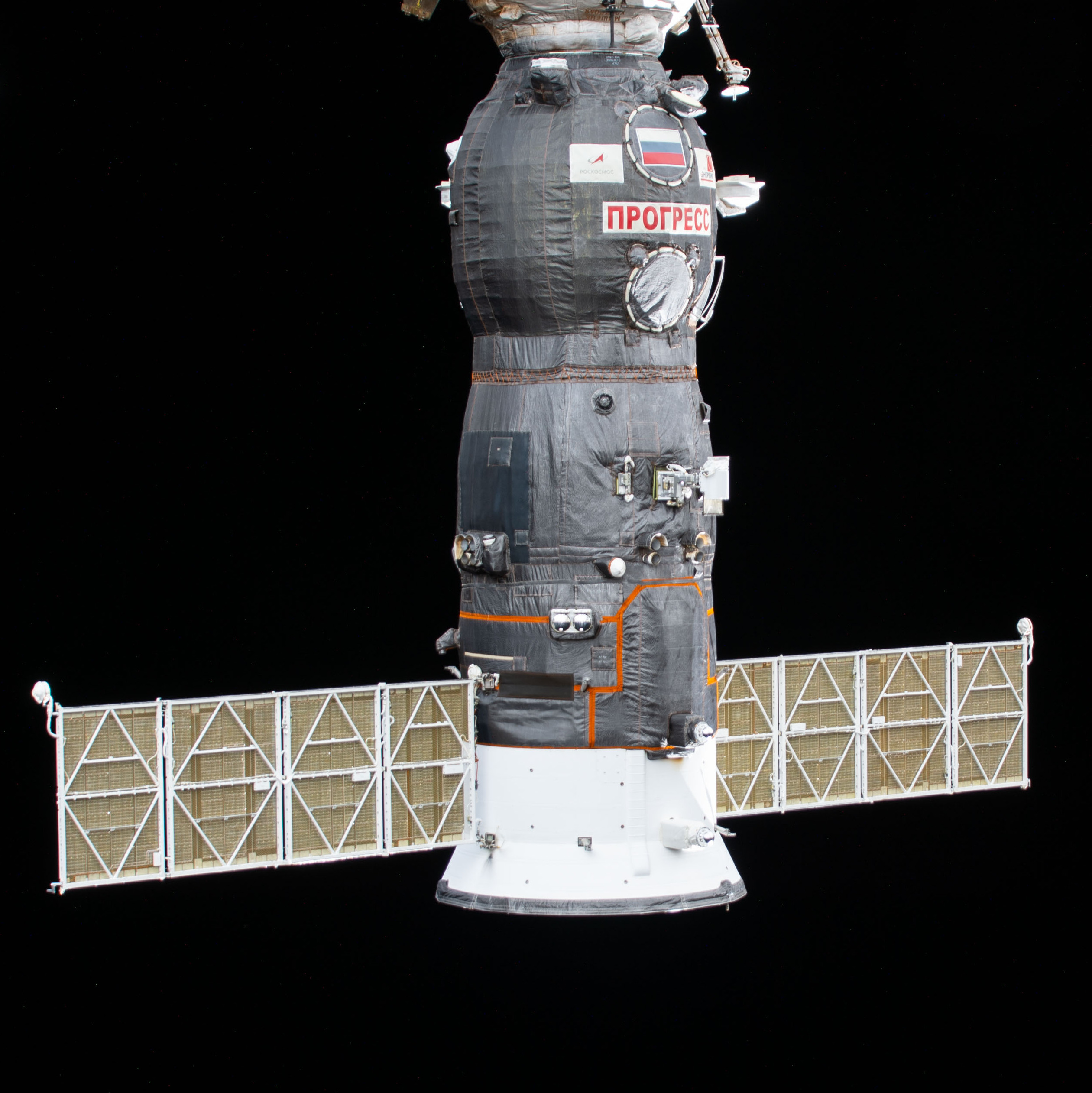
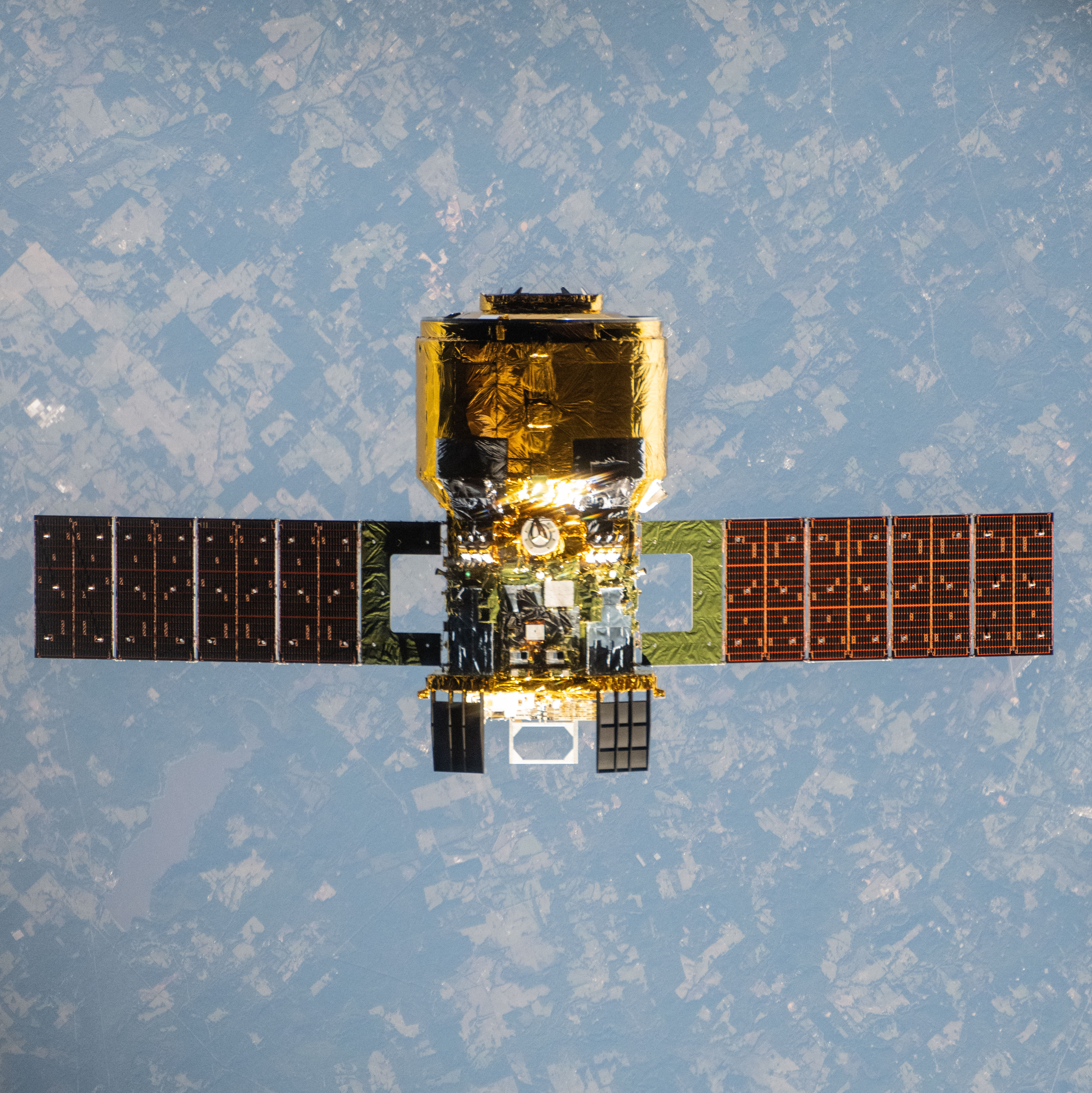
The four active uncrewed spacecraft flying to the ISS clockwise from top left: Cargo Dragon 2, Cygnus XL, HTV-X and Progress MS.

Uncrewed spaceflights to the International Space Station (ISS) are made primarily to deliver cargo, however several Russian modules have also docked to the outpost following uncrewed launches. Resupply missions typically use the Russian Progress spacecraft, i.e., Progress-M (Standard and Modified), Progress-M1 and Progress MS series vehicles, European Automated Transfer Vehicles, Japanese Kounotori vehicles, and the American Dragon 1 and 2 vehicles and Cygnus (Standard, Enhanced and XL series) spacecraft. The primary docking system for Progress spacecraft is the automated Kurs system, with the manual TORU system as a backup. ATVs also use Kurs, however they are not equipped with TORU. The other spacecraft — the Japanese HTVs and HTV-Xs, the SpaceX Dragon (under CRS phase 1) and the Northrop Grumman Cygnus vehicles — rendezvous with the station before being grappled using Canadarm2 and berthed at the nadir port of the Harmony or Unity module for one to two months. Progress, Cygnus and ATV can remain docked for up to six months. Under CRS phase 2, SpaceX Cargo Dragon docks autonomously at IDA-2 or 3 as the case may be. As of November 2026, Progress spacecraft have flown most of the uncrewed missions to the ISS.

To avoid confusion, this list includes Soyuz MS-23, which was launched uncrewed and landed crewed, but does not include Soyuz MS-22 and Boeing Crew Flight Test, both of which launched crewed and landed uncrewed, and are listed at List of human spaceflights to the International Space Station.

== Current and completed spaceflights ==
Graphical representation of history of uncrewed flights, divided by year and rocket family.

This is a list of uncrewed spaceflights to the International Space Station.

Key to box background colors:

- Module launch
- Launch failure, spacecraft did not reach orbit
- Partial failure, spacecraft reached orbit but did not rendezvous with ISS

Note: Russia has delivered cargo via the uncrewed missions of Progress since the launch of the ISS, while the U.S. had used Space Shuttles for hybrid human/cargo missions, resulting in a greater number of Russian uncrewed flights to the ISS. Since the discontinuation of the Space Shuttle program in 2011, the numbers of crewed and uncrewed flights by the U.S. and Russia are more closely matched.

No.	Spacecraft		Flight No.	Mission	Launch vehicle	Launch (UTC)	Docked/Berthed (UTC) ^{†}	Undocked/Unberthed (UTC)	Duration
1	Zarya	(Russia) (United States)	ISS‑1A/R	Cargo storage	Proton-K	20 Nov 1998, 06:40	Reached ISS orbit: 25 Nov 1998	First module of ISS	
2	Zvezda	(Russia)	ISS‑1R	Service module	Proton-K	12 Jul 2000, 04:56	26 Jul 2000, 00:44	attached to ISS	
3	Progress M1-3	(Russia)	ISS‑1P	Logistics	Soyuz‑U	6 Aug 2000, 18:26	8 Aug 2000, 20:12	1 Nov 2000, 04:04	84d 7h 52m
4	Progress M1-4	(Russia)	ISS‑2P	Logistics	Soyuz‑U	16 Nov 2000, 01:32	18 Nov 2000, 03:47	1 Dec 2000, 16:22	13d 12h 35m
4	Progress M1-4	(Russia)	ISS‑2P	Logistics	Soyuz‑U	16 Nov 2000, 01:32	26 Dec 2000, 11:03	8 Feb 2001, 11:26	44d 23m
5	Progress M-44	(Russia)	ISS‑3P	Logistics	Soyuz‑U	26 Feb 2001, 08:09	28 Feb 2001, 09:50	16 Apr 2001, 08:48	46d 22h 58m
6	Progress M1-6	(Russia)	ISS‑4P	Logistics	Soyuz‑FG	20 May 2001, 22:32	23 May 2001, 00:24	22 Aug 2001, 06:02	91d 5h 38m
7	Progress M-45	(Russia)	ISS‑5P	Logistics	Soyuz‑U	21 Aug 2001, 09:24	23 Aug 2001, 09:51	22 Nov 2001, 16:12	91d 6h 21m
8	Pirs	(Russia)	ISS‑4R	Docking/airlock module	Soyuz‑U	14 Sep 2001, 23:35	17 Sep 2001, 01:05	26 Jul 2021, 10:55 with Progress MS-16	7252d 9h 50m
8	Progress DC-1	(Russia)	ISS‑4R	Delivered Pirs	Soyuz‑U	14 Sep 2001, 23:35	17 Sep 2001, 01:05	26 Sep 2001,15:36	9d 14h 31m
9	Progress M1-7	(Russia)	ISS‑6P	Logistics	Soyuz‑FG	26 Nov 2001, 18:24	28 Nov 2001, 19:43	19 Mar 2002, 17:43	110d 22 h
10	Progress M1-8	(Russia)	ISS‑7P	Logistics	Soyuz‑U	21 Mar 2002, 20:13	24 Mar 2002, 20:57	25 Jun 2002, 08:26	92d 11h 29m
11	Progress M-46	(Russia)	ISS‑8P	Logistics	Soyuz‑U	26 Jun 2002, 05:36	29 Jun 2002, 06:23	24 Sep 2002, 13:59	87d 7h 36m
12	Progress M1-9	(Russia)	ISS‑9P	Logistics	Soyuz‑FG	25 Sep 2002, 16:58	29 Sep 2002, 17:00	1 Feb 2003, 16:00	124d 23 h
13	Progress M-47	(Russia)	ISS‑10P	Logistics	Soyuz‑U	2 Feb 2003, 12:59	4 Feb 2003, 14:49	28 Aug 2003, 22:48	205d 7h 59m
14	Progress M1-10	(Russia)	ISS‑11P	Logistics	Soyuz‑U	8 Jun 2003, 10:34	11 Jun 2003, 11:15	4 Sep 2003, 19:41	85d 8h 26m
15	Progress M-48	(Russia)	ISS‑12P	Logistics	Soyuz‑U	29 Aug 2003, 01:48	31 Aug 2003, 03:40	28 Jan 2004, 08:35	150d 4h 55m
16	Progress M1-11	(Russia)	ISS‑13P	Logistics	Soyuz‑U	29 Jan 2004, 11:58	31 Jan 2004, 13:13	24 May 2004, 09:19	113d 20h 6m
17	Progress M-49	(Russia)	ISS‑14P	Logistics	Soyuz‑U	25 May 2004, 12:34	27 May 2004, 13:54	30 Jul 2004, 06:05	63d 16h 11m
18	Progress M-50	(Russia)	ISS‑15P	Logistics	Soyuz‑U	11 Aug 2004, 05:03	14 Aug 2004, 05:03	22 Dec 2004, 18:37	130d 13h 34m
19	Progress M-51	(Russia)	ISS‑16P	Logistics	Soyuz‑U	23 Dec 2004, 22:19	25 Dec 2004, 23:58	27 Feb 2005, 16:07	63d 16h 9m
20	Progress M-52	(Russia)	ISS‑17P	Logistics	Soyuz‑U	28 Feb 2005, 19:09	2 Mar 2005, 19:10	16 Jun 2005, 20:15	106d 1h 5m
21	Progress M-53	(Russia)	ISS‑18P	Logistics	Soyuz‑U	16 Jun 2005, 23:09	19 Jun 2005, 00:45	7 Sep 2005, 06:26	80d 5h 41m
22	Progress M-54	(Russia)	ISS‑19P	Logistics	Soyuz‑U	8 Sep 2005, 09:08	10 Sep 2005, 10:42	3 Mar 2006, 10:06	173d 23h 24m
23	Progress M-55	(Russia)	ISS‑20P	Logistics	Soyuz‑U	21 Dec 2005, 18:38	23 Dec 2005, 19:46	19 Jun 2006, 14:06	177d 18h 21m
24	Progress M-56	(Russia)	ISS‑21P	Logistics	Soyuz‑U	24 Apr 2006, 16:03	26 Apr 2006, 16:12	19 Sep 2006, 00:28	145d 6h 47m
25	Progress M-57	(Russia)	ISS‑22P	Logistics	Soyuz‑U	24 Jun 2006, 15:08	26 Jun 2006, 16:24	16 Jan 2007, 23:32	204d 7h 8m
26	Progress M-58	(Russia)	ISS‑23P	Logistics	Soyuz‑U	23 Oct 2006, 13:41	26 Oct 2006, 14:28	27 Mar 2007, 18:00	152d 3h 32m
27	Progress M-59	(Russia)	ISS‑24P	Logistics	Soyuz‑U	18 Jan 2007, 02:12	20 Jan 2007, 03:58	1 Aug 2007, 14:07	193d 10h 9m
28	Progress M-60	(Russia)	ISS‑25P	Logistics	Soyuz‑U	12 May 2007, 03:25	15 May 2007, 05:10	19 Sep 2007, 00:37	126d 19h 27m
29	Progress M-61	(Russia)	ISS‑26P	Logistics	Soyuz‑U	2 Aug 2007, 17:34	5 Aug 2007, 18:40	22 Dec 2007, 04:00	138d 9h 20m
30	Progress M-62	(Russia)	ISS‑27P	Logistics	Soyuz‑U	23 Dec 2007, 07:12	26 Dec 2007, 08:14	4 Feb 2008, 10:32	40d 2h 18m
31	Progress M-63	(Russia)	ISS‑28P	Logistics	Soyuz‑U	5 Feb 2008, 13:02	7 Feb 2008, 14:30	7 Apr 2008, 08:49	59d 18h 19m
32	Jules Verne	(European Union)	ATV‑1	Flight test, logistics	Ariane 5ES	9 Mar 2008, 04:03	3 Apr 2008, 14:45	5 Sep 2008, 21:29	155d 6h 44m
33	Progress M-64	(Russia)	ISS‑29P	Logistics	Soyuz‑U	14 May 2008, 20:22	16 May 2008, 21:39	1 Sep 2008, 19:47	107d 22h 8m
34	Progress M-65	(Russia)	ISS‑30P	Logistics	Soyuz‑U	10 Sep 2008, 19:50	17 Sep 2008, 18:43	14 Nov 2008, 16:19	57d 21h 36m
35	Progress M-01M	(Russia)	ISS‑31P	Logistics	Soyuz‑U	26 Nov 2008, 12:38	30 Nov 2008, 12:28	6 Feb 2009, 04:10	67d 15h 42m
36	Progress M-66	(Russia)	ISS‑32P	Logistics	Soyuz‑U	10 Feb 2009, 05:49:46	13 Feb 2009, 07:18	6 May 2009, 15:17	82d 7h 59m
37	Progress M-02M	(Russia)	ISS‑33P	Logistics	Soyuz‑U	7 May 2009, 18:37:09	12 May 2009, 19:24:23	30 Jun 2009, 18:29:43	53d 23h 52m
38	Progress M-67	(Russia)	ISS‑34P	Logistics	Soyuz‑U	24 Jul 2009, 10:56:53	29 Jul 2009, 11:12	21 Sep 2009, 07:25	53d 20h 13m
39	HTV-1	(Japan)	HTV‑1	Flight test, logistics	H-IIB	10 Sep 2009, 17:01:56	17 Sep 2009, 22:12	30 Oct 2009, 15:18	42d 17h 6m
40	Progress M-03M	(Russia)	ISS‑35P	Logistics	Soyuz‑U	15 Oct 2009, 01:14:37	18 Oct 2009, 01:40	22 Apr 2010, 16:32	186d 14h 52m
41	Poisk	(Russia)	ISS‑5R	Airlock	Soyuz‑U	10 Nov 2009, 14:22:04	12 Nov 2009, 15:44	attached to ISS	
41	Progress M-MIM2	(Russia)	ISS‑5R	Delivered Poisk	Soyuz‑U	10 Nov 2009, 14:22:04	12 Nov 2009, 15:44	8 Dec 2009, 00:16	25d 8h 32m
42	Progress M-04M	(Russia)	ISS‑36P	Logistics	Soyuz‑U	3 Feb 2010, 03:45:31	5 Feb 2010, 04:26	10 May 2010, 11:16	94d 6h 50m
43	Progress M-05M	(Russia)	ISS‑37P	Logistics	Soyuz‑U	28 Apr 2010, 17:15:09	1 May 2010, 18:32	25 Oct 2010, 14:22	176d 19h 50m
44	Progress M-06M	(Russia)	ISS‑38P	Logistics	Soyuz‑U	30 Jun 2010, 15:35:15	4 Jul 2010, 16:17	31 Aug 2010, 11:21	57d 19h 4m
45	Progress M-07M	(Russia)	ISS‑39P	Logistics	Soyuz‑U	10 Sep 2010, 10:22:58	12 Sep 2010, 11:57	20 Feb 2011, 13:12	161d 1h 15m
46	Progress M-08M	(Russia)	ISS‑40P	Logistics	Soyuz‑U	27 Oct 2010, 15:11:50	30 Oct 2010, 16:36	24 Jan 2011, 00:42	85d 8h 6m
47	Kounotori 2	(Japan)	HTV‑2	Logistics	H-IIB	22 Jan 2011, 05:37:57	27 Jan 2011, 14:51	28 Mar 2011, 13:43	59d 22h 52m
48	Progress M-09M	(Russia)	ISS‑41P	Logistics	Soyuz‑U	28 Jan 2011, 01:31:39	30 Jan 2011, 02:39	22 Apr 2011, 11:41	82d 9h 2m
49	Johannes Kepler	(European Union)	ATV‑2	Logistics	Ariane 5ES	16 Feb 2011, 21:50:55	24 Feb 2011, 15:59	20 Jun 2011, 14:46	115d 22h 47m
50	Progress M-10M	(Russia)	ISS‑42P	Logistics	Soyuz‑U	27 Apr 2011, 13:05:22	29 Apr 2011, 14:28	29 Oct 2011, 09:04	182d 18h 36m
51	Progress M-11M	(Russia)	ISS‑43P	Logistics	Soyuz‑U	21 Jun 2011, 14:38:15	23 Jun 2011, 16:37	23 Aug 2011, 09:34	60d 17h 0m
52	Progress M-12M	(Russia)	ISS‑44P	Logistics	Soyuz‑U	24 Aug 2011, 13:00:08	Failed to reach orbit		
53	Progress M-13M	(Russia)	ISS‑45P	Logistics	Soyuz‑U	30 Oct 2011, 10:11:13	2 Nov 2011, 11:41	23 Jan 2012, 22:09	82d 10h 28m
54	Progress M-14M	(Russia)	ISS‑46P	Logistics	Soyuz‑U	25 Jan 2012, 23:06:40	28 Jan 2012, 00:09	19 Apr 2012, 11:04	82d 10h 55m
55	Edoardo Amaldi	(European Union)	ATV‑3	Logistics	Ariane 5ES	23 Mar 2012, 04:34:04	28 Mar 2012, 22:31	28 Sep 2012, 21:44	183d 23h 13m
56	Progress M-15M	(Russia)	ISS‑47P	Logistics	Soyuz‑U	20 Apr 2012, 12:50:24	22 Apr 2012, 14:36	22 Jul 2012, 20:26	91d 5h 50m
56	Progress M-15M	(Russia)	ISS‑47P	Logistics	Soyuz‑U	20 Apr 2012, 12:50:24	29 Jul 2012, 01:01	30 Jul 2012, 21:19	1 day, 20h 18m
57	Dragon C2+	(United States)	CRS SpX‑D	Flight test, logistics	Falcon 9	22 May 2012, 07:44:38	25 May 2012, 16:02	31 May 2012, 08:07	5d 16h 5m
58	Kounotori 3	(Japan)	HTV‑3	Logistics	H-IIB	21 Jul 2012, 02:06:18	27 Jul 2012, 14:34	12 Sep 2012, 11:50	46d 21h 16m
59	Progress M-16M	(Russia)	ISS‑48P	Logistics	Soyuz‑U	1 Aug 2012, 19:35:13	2 Aug 2012, 01:18	9 Feb 2013, 13:15	191d 11h 57m
60	SpaceX CRS-1	(United States)	CRS SpX‑1	Logistics	Falcon 9	7 Oct 2012, 00:35:00	10 Oct 2012, 13:03	28 Oct 2012, 11:19	17d 22h 16m
61	Progress M-17M	(Russia)	ISS‑49P	Logistics	Soyuz‑U	31 Oct 2012, 07:41:19	31 Oct 2012, 13:33	15 Apr 2013, 12:02	165d 22h 29m
62	Progress M-18M	(Russia)	ISS‑50P	Logistics	Soyuz‑U	11 Feb 2013, 14:41:46	11 Feb 2013, 20:35	25 Jul 2013, 20:43	164d 8m
63	SpaceX CRS-2	(United States)	CRS SpX‑2	Logistics	Falcon 9	1 Mar 2013, 15:10:13	3 Mar 2013, 13:56	26 Mar 2013, 08:10	22d 18h 14m
64	Progress M-19M	(Russia)	ISS‑51P	Logistics	Soyuz‑U	24 Apr 2013, 10:12:16	26 Apr 2013, 12:25	11 Jun 2013, 13:58	46d 1h 33m
65	Albert Einstein	(European Union)	ATV‑4	Logistics	Ariane 5ES	5 Jun 2013, 21:52:11	15 Jun 2013, 14:07	28 Oct 2013, 08:55	134d 18h 48m
66	Progress M-20M	(Russia)	ISS‑52P	Logistics	Soyuz‑U	27 Jul 2013, 20:45:08	28 Jul 2013, 02:26	3 Feb 2014, 16:21	190d 13h 55m
67	Kounotori 4	(Japan)	HTV‑4	Logistics	H-IIB	3 Aug 2013, 19:48:46	9 Aug 2013, 15:38	4 Sep 2013, 12:07	25d 20h 29m
68	Cygnus Orb-D1	(United States)	CRS Orb-D	Flight test, logistics	Antares 110	18 Sep 2013, 14:58:02	29 Sep 2013, 12:44	22 Oct 2013, 10:04	22d 21h 20m
69	Progress M-21M	(Russia)	ISS‑53P	Logistics	Soyuz‑U	25 Nov 2013, 20:53:06	29 Nov 2013, 22:30	23 Apr 2014, 08:58	144d 10h 28m
69	Progress M-21M	(Russia)	ISS‑53P	Logistics	Soyuz‑U	25 Nov 2013, 20:53:06	25 Apr 2014, 12:13	9 Jun 2014, 13:29	46d 1h 16m
70	Cygnus CRS Orb-1	(United States)	CRS Orb-1	Logistics	Antares 120	9 Jan 2014, 18:07:05	12 Jan 2014, 13:05	18 Feb 2014, 10:25	36d 21h 20m
71	Progress M-22M	(Russia)	ISS‑54P	Logistics	Soyuz‑U	5 Feb 2014, 16:23:32	5 Feb 2014, 22:22	7 Apr 2014, 13:58	60d 15h 36m
72	Progress M-23M	(Russia)	ISS‑55P	Logistics	Soyuz‑U	9 Apr 2014, 15:26:27	9 Apr 2014, 21:14	21 Jul 2014, 21:44	103d 0h 30m
73	SpaceX CRS-3	(United States)	CRS SpX‑3	Logistics	Falcon 9	18 Apr 2014, 19:25:22	20 Apr 2014, 14:06	18 May 2014, 11:55	27d 21h 49m
74	Cygnus CRS Orb-2	(United States)	CRS Orb-2	Logistics	Antares 120	13 Jul 2014, 16:52:14	16 Jul 2014, 12:53	15 Aug 2014, 09:14	29d 20h 21m
75	Progress M-24M	(Russia)	ISS‑56P	Logistics	Soyuz‑U	23 Jul 2014, 21:44:44	24 Jul 2014, 03:31	27 Oct 2014, 05:38	95d 2h 7m
76	Georges Lemaître	(European Union)	ATV‑5	Logistics	Ariane 5ES	29 Jul 2014, 23:47:38	12 Aug 2014, 13:30	14 Feb 2015, 13:42	186d 12m
77	SpaceX CRS-4	(United States)	CRS SpX‑4	Logistics	Falcon 9	21 Sep 2014, 05:52:03	23 Sep 2014, 13:21	25 Oct 2014, 12:02	31d 22h 41m
78	Cygnus CRS Orb-3	(United States)	CRS Orb-3	Logistics	Antares 130	28 Oct 2014, 22:22:38	Failed to reach orbit		
79	Progress M-25M	(Russia)	ISS‑57P	Logistics	Soyuz‑2.1a	29 Oct 2014, 07:09:43	29 Oct 2014, 13:08	25 Apr 2015, 06:41	177d 17h 33m
80	SpaceX CRS-5	(United States)	CRS SpX‑5	Logistics	Falcon 9	10 Jan 2015, 09:47:10	12 Jan 2015, 13:54	10 Feb 2015, 17:11	29d 3h 17m
81	Progress M-26M	(Russia)	ISS‑58P	Logistics	Soyuz‑U	17 Feb 2015, 11:00:17	17 Feb 2015, 16:57	14 Aug 2015, 10:19	177d 17h 22m
82	SpaceX CRS-6	(United States)	CRS SpX‑6	Logistics	Falcon 9	14 Apr 2015, 20:10:41	17 Apr 2015, 13:29	21 May 2015, 09:29	33d 20h
83	Progress M-27M	(Russia)	ISS‑59P	Logistics	Soyuz‑2.1a	28 Apr 2015, 07:09:50	Spacecraft control failed before reaching ISS; loss of mission		
84	SpaceX CRS-7	(United States)	CRS SpX‑7	Logistics, docking adapter delivery	Falcon 9	28 Jun 2015, 14:21:11	Failed to reach orbit		
85	Progress M-28M	(Russia)	ISS‑60P	Logistics	Soyuz‑U	3 Jul 2015, 04:55:48	5 Jul 2015, 07:11	19 Dec 2015, 07:35	167d 24m
86	Kounotori 5	(Japan)	HTV‑5	Logistics	H-IIB	19 Aug 2015, 11:50:49	24 Aug 2015, 17:28	28 Sep 2015, 11:12	34d 17h 44m
87	Progress M-29M	(Russia)	ISS‑61P	Logistics	Soyuz‑U	1 Oct 2015, 16:49:48	1 Oct 2015, 22:52	30 Mar 2016, 14:14	180d 15h 22m
88	Cygnus CRS OA-4	(United States)	CRS OA-4	Logistics	Atlas V 401	6 Dec 2015, 21:44:57	9 Dec 2015, 14:14	19 Feb 2016, 10:38	71d 20h 24m
89	Progress MS-01	(Russia)	ISS‑62P	Logistics	Soyuz‑2.1a	21 Dec 2015, 08:44:39	23 Dec 2015, 10:27	3 Jul 2016, 03:48	192d 17h 21m
90	Cygnus CRS OA-6	(United States)	CRS OA-6	Logistics	Atlas V 401	22 Mar 2016, 03:05:52	26 Mar 2016, 14:52	14 Jun 2016, 11:43	79d 20h 51m
91	Progress MS-02	(Russia)	ISS‑63P	Logistics	Soyuz‑2.1a	31 Mar 2016, 16:23:58	2 Apr 2016, 17:58	14 Oct 2016, 09:37	194d 15h 39m
92	SpaceX CRS-8	(United States)	CRS SpX‑8	Logistics, delivered Bigelow Expandable Activity Module	Falcon 9	8 Apr 2016, 20:43:00	10 Apr 2016, 13:57	11 May 2016, 11:00	30d 23h 22m
93	Progress MS-03	(Russia)	ISS‑64P	Logistics	Soyuz‑U	16 Jul 2016, 21:41:45	19 Jul 2016, 00:20	31 Jan 2017, 14:25	196d 14h 5m
94	SpaceX CRS-9	(United States)	CRS SpX‑9	Logistics, docking adapter delivery	Falcon 9	18 Jul 2016, 04:45:29	20 Jul 2016, 14:00	25 Aug 2016, 21:00	36d 7h
95	Cygnus CRS OA-5	(United States)	CRS OA-5	Logistics	Antares 230	17 Oct 2016, 23:45:40	23 Oct 2016, 14:53	21 Nov 2016, 11:25	28d 20h 32m
96	Progress MS-04	(Russia)	ISS‑65P	Logistics	Soyuz‑U	1 Dec 2016, 14:51:45	Spacecraft separated from third stage before reaching orbit; loss of mission		
97	Kounotori 6	(Japan)	HTV‑6	Logistics	H-IIB	9 Dec 2016, 13:26:47	13 Dec 2016, 13:57	27 Jan 2017, 10:59	44d 21h 2m
98	SpaceX CRS-10	(United States)	CRS SpX‑10	Logistics	Falcon 9	19 Feb 2017, 09:38:58	23 Feb 2017 13:12	18 Mar 2017, 21:20	23d 8h 8m
99	Progress MS-05	(Russia)	ISS‑66P	Logistics	Soyuz‑U	22 Feb 2017, 05:58:33	24 Feb 2017, 08:30	20 Jul 2017, 12:00	146d 3h 30m
100	Cygnus CRS OA-7	(United States)	CRS OA-7	Logistics	Atlas V 401	18 Apr 2017, 15:11:26	22 Apr 2017, 12:39	4 Jun 2017, 11:05	42d 22h 26m
101	SpaceX CRS-11	(United States)	CRS SpX‑11	Logistics	Falcon 9	3 Jun 2017, 21:07:17	5 Jun 2017, 16:07	2 Jul 2017, 18:00	27d 1h 53m
102	Progress MS-06	(Russia)	ISS‑67P	Logistics	Soyuz‑2.1a	14 Jun 2017, 09:20:13	16 Jun 2017, 11:37	28 Dec 2017, 01:03:30	194d 13h 26m
103	SpaceX CRS-12	(United States)	CRS SpX‑12	Logistics	Falcon 9	14 Aug 2017, 16:31:00	16 Aug 2017, 10:52	17 Sep 2017, 08:40	31d 21h 48m
104	Progress MS-07	(Russia)	ISS‑68P	Logistics	Soyuz‑2.1a	14 Oct 2017, 08:47:11	16 Oct 2017, 00:00	28 Mar 2018, 13:50	163d 13h 50m
105	Cygnus CRS OA-8E	(United States)	CRS OA-8E	Logistics	Antares 230	12 Nov 2017, 12:20:26	14 Nov 2017, 12:15	5 Dec 2017, 17:52	21d 5h 37m
106	SpaceX CRS-13	(United States)	CRS SpX‑13	Logistics	Falcon 9	15 Dec 2017, 15:36:00	17 Dec 2017, 13:26	12 Jan 2018, 10:47	25d 21h 21m
107	Progress MS-08	(Russia)	ISS‑69P	Logistics	Soyuz‑2.1a	13 Feb 2018, 08:13:33	15 Feb 2018, 10:38	23 Aug 2018, 02:16	188d 15h 38m
108	SpaceX CRS-14	(United States)	CRS SpX‑14	Logistics	Falcon 9	2 Apr 2018, 20:30:38	4 Apr 2018, 13:00	5 May 2018 05:30	30d 16h 30m
109	Cygnus CRS OA-9E	(United States)	CRS OA-9E	Logistics	Antares 230	21 May 2018, 08:44:06	24 May 2018, 12:13	15 Jul 2018, 10:20	51d 22h 7m
110	SpaceX CRS-15	(United States)	CRS SpX‑15	Logistics	Falcon 9	29 Jun 2018, 09:42:42	2 Jul 2018, 10:54	3 Aug 2018, 16:38	32d 5h 44m
111	Progress MS-09	(Russia)	ISS‑70P	Logistics	Soyuz‑2.1a	9 Jul 2018, 21:51:33	10 Jul 2018, 01:31	25 Jan 2019, 12:55	199d 11h 24m
112	Kounotori 7	(Japan)	HTV‑7	Logistics	H-IIB	22 Sep 2018, 17:52:27	27 Sep 2018, 12:00	6 Nov 2018, 23:32	40d 11h 32m
113	Progress MS-10	(Russia)	ISS‑71P	Logistics	Soyuz‑FG	16 Nov 2018, 18:14:08	18 Nov 2018, 19:28	4 Jun 2019, 08:40	197d 13h 12m
114	Cygnus NG-10	(United States)	CRS NG-10E	Logistics	Antares 230	17 Nov 2018, 09:01:31	19 Nov 2018, 12:31	8 Feb 2019, 14:37	81d 2h 6m
115	SpaceX CRS-16	(United States)	CRS SpX‑16	Logistics	Falcon 9 Block 5	5 Dec 2018, 18:16	8 Dec 2018, 15:36	13 Jan 2019, 23:33	36d 7h 57m
116	SpaceX Demo-1	(United States)	SpX‑DM1	Uncrewed flight test of crewed capsule	Falcon 9 Block 5	2 Mar 2019, 07:49	3 Mar 2019, 10:51	8 Mar 2019, 07:30	4d 20h 39m
117	Progress MS-11	(Russia)	ISS‑72P	Logistics	Soyuz‑2.1a	4 Apr 2019, 11:01:35	4 Apr 2019, 14:22	29 Jul 2019, 10:44	115d 20h 22m
118	Cygnus NG-11	(United States)	CRS NG-11	Logistics	Antares 230	17 Apr 2019, 20:46:07	19 Apr 2019, 11:31	6 Aug 2019, 13:30	109d 1h 59m
119	SpaceX CRS-17	(United States)	CRS SpX‑17	Logistics	Falcon 9 Block 5	4 May 2019, 06:48	6 May 2019, 13:33	3 Jun 2019, 16:01	28d 2h 28m
120	SpaceX CRS-18	(United States)	CRS SpX‑18	Logistics, docking adapter delivery	Falcon 9 Block 5	25 Jul 2019, 22:01:56	27 Jul 2019, 16:01	27 Aug 2019, 12:25	30d 20h 24m
121	Progress MS-12	(Russia)	ISS‑73P	Logistics	Soyuz‑2.1a	31 Jul 2019, 12:10:46	31 Jul 2019, 15:29	29 Nov 2019, 10:25	120d 18h 56m
122	Soyuz MS-14	(Russia)	ISS‑60S	Flight test	Soyuz‑2.1a	22 Aug 2019, 03:38:32	27 Aug 2019, 03:08	6 Sep 2019, 18:14	10d 15h 6m
123	Kounotori 8	(Japan)	HTV‑8	Logistics	H-IIB	24 Sep 2019, 16:05:05	28 Sep 2019, 14:09	1 Nov 2019, 13:45	33d 23h 36m
124	Cygnus NG-12	(United States)	CRS NG-12	Logistics	Antares 230+	2 Nov 2019, 13:59:47	4 Nov 2019, 11:21	31 Jan 2020, 13:10	88d 4h
125	SpaceX CRS-19	(United States)	CRS SpX‑19	Logistics	Falcon 9 Block 5	5 Dec 2019, 17:29:24	8 Dec 2019, 12:47	7 Jan 2020, 08:41	29d 19h 54m
126	Progress MS-13	(Russia)	ISS‑74P	Logistics	Soyuz‑2.1a	6 Dec 2019, 09:34:24	9 Dec 2019, 10:35	8 July 2020, 18:22	212d 7h 48m
127	Boeing Orbital Flight Test	(United States)	Boe-OFT	Flight test	Atlas V N22	20 Dec 2019, 11:36:43	Issue with spacecraft's mission elapsed time (MET) clock caused the spacecraft to burn into an incorrect orbit, preventing a rendezvous with the ISS		
128	Cygnus NG-13	(United States)	CRS NG-13	Logistics	Antares 230+	15 Feb 2020, 20:21:01	18 Feb 2020, 11:16	11 May 2020, 13:00	83d 1h 44m
129	SpaceX CRS-20	(United States)	CRS SpX‑20	Logistics	Falcon 9 Block 5	7 Mar 2020, 04:52:46	9 Mar 2020, 12:18	7 Apr 2020, 10:30	28d 22h 12m
130	Progress MS-14	(Russia)	ISS‑75P	Logistics	Soyuz‑2.1a	25 Apr 2020, 01:51:41	25 Apr 2020, 05:12	27 Apr 2021, 23:11	367d 17h 59m
131	Kounotori 9	(Japan)	HTV‑9	Logistics	H-IIB	20 May 2020, 17:31:05	25 May 2020, 14:46	18 Aug 2020, 13:51	85d 1h 38m
132	Progress MS-15	(Russia)	ISS‑76P	Logistics	Soyuz‑2.1a	23 Jul 2020, 14:26:21	23 Jul 2020, 17:45	9 Feb 2021, 05:21	200d 11h 36m
133	Cygnus NG-14	(United States)	CRS NG-14	Logistics	Antares 230+	3 Oct 2020, 01:16:14	5 Oct 2020, 12:01	6 Jan 2021, 12:15	93d 14m
134	SpaceX CRS-21	(United States)	CRS SpX‑21	Logistics, delivered Nanoracks Bishop Airlock	Falcon 9 Block 5	6 Dec 2020, 16:17:46	7 Dec 2020, 18:40	12 Jan 2021, 14:05	35d 19h 25m
135	Progress MS-16	(Russia)	ISS‑77P	Logistics	Soyuz‑2.1a	15 Feb 2021, 04:45:06	17 Feb 2021, 06:27	26 Jul 2021, 10:55	159d 4h 28m
136	Cygnus NG-15	(United States)	CRS NG-15	Logistics	Antares 230+	20 Feb 2021, 17:36:50	22 Feb 2021, 12:16	29 Jun 2021, 13:20	127d 1h 4m
137	SpaceX CRS-22	(United States)	CRS SpX‑22	Logistics, delivered iROSA 2B/4B solar arrays	Falcon 9 Block 5	3 Jun 2021, 17:29:15	5 Jun 2021, 09:09	8 Jul 2021, 14:45	33d 5h 36m
138	Progress MS-17	(Russia)	ISS‑78P	Logistics	Soyuz‑2.1a	29 Jun 2021, 23:27:20	2 Jul 2021, 00:59	25 Nov 2021, 11:22 with Nauka's nadir passive port adapter	146d 10h 23m
139	Nauka	(Russia)	ISS‑3R	Multipurpose Laboratory module	Proton-M	21 Jul 2021, 14:58	29 Jul 2021, 13:29	attached to ISS	
140	Cygnus NG-16	(United States)	CRS NG-16	Logistics	Antares 230+	10 Aug 2021, 22:01:05	12 Aug 2021, 10:07	20 Nov 2021, 13:40	100d 3h 33m
141	SpaceX CRS-23	(United States)	CRS SpX‑23	Logistics	Falcon 9 Block 5	29 Aug 2021, 07:14:49	30 Aug 2021, 14:30	30 Sep 2021, 13:12	30d 22h 42m
142	Progress MS-18	(Russia)	ISS‑79P	Logistics, delivered equipment for Nauka module	Soyuz‑2.1a	28 Oct 2021, 00:00:32	30 Oct 2021, 01:31	1 Jun 2022, 08:03	214d 6h 32m
143	Prichal	(Russia)	ISS‑6R	Docking module	Soyuz‑2.1b	24 Nov 2021, 13:06:35	26 Nov 2021, 15:19	attached to ISS	
143	Progress M-UM	(Russia)	ISS‑6R	Delivered Prichal	Soyuz‑2.1b	24 Nov 2021, 13:06:35	26 Nov 2021, 15:19	22 Dec 2021, 23:03	26d 7h 44m
144	SpaceX CRS-24	(United States)	CRS SpX‑24	Logistics	Falcon 9 Block 5	21 Dec 2021, 10:07:08	22 Dec 2021, 08:41	23 Jan 2022, 15:40	32d 6h 59m
145	Progress MS-19	(Russia)	ISS‑80P	Logistics	Soyuz‑2.1a	15 Feb 2022, 04:25:40	17 Feb 2022, 07:03	23 Oct 2022, 22:45:34	248d 3h 42m
146	Cygnus NG-17	(United States)	CRS NG-17	Logistics	Antares 230+	19 Feb 2022, 17:40:07	21 Feb 2022, 12:02	28 Jun 2022, 07:00	126d 18h 58m
147	Boeing Orbital Flight Test 2	(United States)	Boe-OFT2	Flight test	Atlas V N22	19 May 2022, 22:54:47	21 May 2022, 00:28	25 May 2022, 18:36	4d 18h 8m
148	Progress MS-20	(Russia)	ISS‑81P	Logistics	Soyuz‑2.1a	3 Jun 2022, 09:32:00	3 Jun 2022, 13:02	7 Feb 2023, 04:56	248d 15h 54m
149	SpaceX CRS-25	(United States)	CRS SpX‑25	Logistics	Falcon 9 Block 5	15 Jul 2022, 00:44:20	16 Jul 2022, 15:21	19 Aug 2022, 15:05	33d 23h 44m
150	Progress MS-21	(Russia)	ISS‑82P	Logistics, delivered equipment for Nauka module	Soyuz‑2.1a	26 Oct 2022, 00:20:09	28 Oct 2022, 02:49	18 Feb 2023, 02:26	112d 23h 37m
151	Cygnus NG-18	(United States)	CRS NG-18	Logistics	Antares 230+	7 Nov 2022, 10:32:42	9 Nov 2022, 13:05	21 Apr 2023, 08:37	162d 19h 32m
152	SpaceX CRS-26	(United States)	CRS SpX‑26	Logistics, delivered iROSA 3A/4A solar arrays	Falcon 9 Block 5	26 Nov 2022, 19:20:42	27 Nov 2022, 12:39	9 Jan 2023, 22:05	43d 9h 26m
153	Progress MS-22	(Russia)	ISS‑83P	Logistics	Soyuz‑2.1a	9 Feb 2023, 06:15:36	11 Feb 2023, 08:45	20 Aug 2023 23:50	190d 15h 5m
154	Soyuz MS-23	(Russia)	ISS‑69S	Replacement crew return vehicle (launched uncrewed, landed crewed)	Soyuz‑2.1a	24 Feb 2023, 00:24:29	26 Feb 2023, 00:58	27 Sep 2023, 07:15	213d 6h 17m
155	SpaceX CRS-27	(United States)	CRS SpX‑27	Logistics	Falcon 9 Block 5	15 Mar 2023, 00:30	16 Mar 2023, 11:52	15 April 2023, 15:05	30d 3h 34m
156	Progress MS-23	(Russia)	ISS‑84P	Logistics	Soyuz‑2.1a	24 May 2023, 12:56	24 May 2023, 16:19	29 Nov 2023, 07:55	188d 15h 36m
157	SpaceX CRS-28	(United States)	CRS SpX‑28	Logistics	Falcon 9 Block 5	5 Jun 2023, 15:47	6 Jun 2023, 09:54	29 Jun 2023, 16:30	23d 6h 36m
158	Cygnus NG-19	(United States)	CRS NG-19	Logistics	Antares 230+	2 Aug 2023, 00:31:14	4 Aug 2023, 12:28	22 Dec 2023, 10:00	139d 21h 32m
159	Progress MS-24	(Russia)	ISS‑85P	Logistics	Soyuz‑2.1a	23 Aug 2023, 01:08	25 Aug 2023, 03:50	13 Feb 2024, 02:09	171d 22h 19m
160	SpaceX CRS-29	(United States)	CRS SpX‑29	Logistics	Falcon 9 Block 5	10 Nov 2023, 01:28	11 Nov 2023, 10:07	21 Dec 2023, 22:05	40d 11h 58m
161	Progress MS-25	(Russia)	ISS‑86P	Logistics	Soyuz‑2.1a	1 Dec 2023, 09:25	3 Dec 2023, 11:15	29 May 2024, 08:39	177d 21h 24m
162	Cygnus NG-20	(United States)	CRS NG-20	Logistics	Falcon 9 Block 5	30 Jan 2024, 17:07:13	1 Feb 2024, 12:14	12 Jul 2024, 08:00	161d 18h 30m
163	Progress MS-26	(Russia)	ISS‑87P	Logistics	Soyuz‑2.1a	15 Feb 2024, 03:25	17 Feb 2024, 06:12	13 Aug 2024, 02:00	177d 19h 48m
164	SpaceX CRS-30	(United States)	CRS SpX‑30	Logistics	Falcon 9 Block 5	21 Mar 2024, 20:55	23 Mar 2024, 11:30	28 Apr 2024, 17:10	36d 5h 40m
165	Progress MS-27	(Russia)	ISS‑88P	Logistics	Soyuz‑2.1a	30 May 2024, 09:42	1 Jun 2024, 11:43	19 Nov 2024, 12:53	171d 1h 10m
166	Cygnus NG-21	(United States)	CRS NG-21	Logistics	Falcon 9 Block 5	4 Aug 2024, 11:02:53	6 Aug 2024, 09:33	28 Mar 2025, 08:50	233d 23h 17m
167	Progress MS-28	(Russia)	ISS‑89P	Logistics	Soyuz‑2.1a	15 Aug 2024, 03:20:17	17 Aug 2024, 05:53	25 Feb 2025, 23:23	192d 17h 30m
168	SpaceX CRS-31	(United States)	CRS SpX‑31	Logistics	Falcon 9 Block 5	5 Nov 2024, 02:29:31	5 Nov 2024, 14:52:11	17 Dec 2024, 18:05	42d 3h 12m
169	Progress MS-29	(Russia)	ISS‑90P	Logistics	Soyuz‑2.1a	21 Nov 2024, 12:22	23 Nov 2024, 14:40	1 Jul 2025, 18:43	222d 6h 21m
170	Progress MS-30	(Russia)	ISS‑91P	Logistics	Soyuz‑2.1a	27 Feb 2025, 21:54	1 Mar 2025, 23:02:30	9 Sep 2025, 15:45:30	191d 16h 43m
171	SpaceX CRS-32	(United States)	CRS SpX‑32	Logistics	Falcon 9 Block 5	21 Apr 2025, 08:15:45	22 Apr 2025, 12:20	23 May 2025, 16:05	31d 3h 45m
172	Progress MS-31	(Russia)	ISS‑92P	Logistics	Soyuz‑2.1a	3 July 2025, 19:32:40	5 July 2025, 21:25	16 Mar 2026, 13:24	253d 15h 59m
173	SpaceX CRS-33	(United States)	CRS SpX‑33	Logistics	Falcon 9 Block 5	24 Aug 2025, 06:45	25 Aug 2025, 11:30	27 Feb 2026, 07:44	185d 20h 14m
174	Progress MS-32	(Russia)	ISS‑93P	Logistics	Soyuz‑2.1a	11 Sep 2025, 15:54:06	13 Sep 2025, 20:23	20 Apr 2026, 22:08:30	219d 1h 45m
175	Cygnus NG-23	(United States)	CRS NG‑23	Logistics	Falcon 9 Block 5	14 Sep 2025, 22:11:49	18 Sep 2025, 14:10	12 Mar 2026, 04:00	174d 13h 50m
176	HTV-X1	(Japan)	HTV‑X1	Logistics	H3-24W	26 Oct 2025, 00:00:15	29 Oct 2025, 15:50	5 Mar 2026, 19:26	127d 3h 36m
177	Progress MS-33	(Russia)	ISS‑94P	Logistics	Soyuz‑2.1a	22 Mar 2026, 11:59:51	24 Mar 2026, 13:40:47	7 Sep 2026, 15:18	167d 1h 37m
178	Cygnus NG-24	(United States)	CRS NG-24	Logistics	Falcon 9 Block 5	11 Apr 2026, 11:41:21	13 Apr 2026, 20:00	9 Oct 2026	178d 4h
179	Progress MS-34	(Russia)	ISS‑95P	Logistics	Soyuz‑2.1a	25 Apr 2026, 22:21:47	28 Apr 2026, 00:00:46	22 Nov 2026 (planned)	206d 17h 46m
180	SpaceX CRS-34	(United States)	CRS SpX‑34	Logistics	Falcon 9 Block 5	15 May 2026, 22:05:41	17 May 2026, 10:37	16 Jun 2026, 16:25	30d 5h 48m
181	Progress MS-35	(Russia)	ISS‑96P	Logistics	Soyuz‑2.1a	16 Sep 2026, 13:33	19 Sep 2026, 13:44	Feb 2027 (planned)	62d 4h 3m
182	SpaceX CRS-35	(United States)	CRS SpX‑35	Logistics	Falcon 9 Block 5	13 Oct 2026, 10:33:44	15 Oct 2026, 14:27	20 Nov 2026, 17:05	36d 2h 38m

For vehicles that are berthed to the station using the Space Station Remote Manipulator System (SSRMS), the times of berthing and unberthing are given. For those vehicles whose berthing and unberthing time is not sure is not provided, SSRMS capture and release is taken. This is because these vehicles remain physically attached to the station longer than indicated when counting the time between initial SSRMS capture and release. Formerly, the Japanese HTV and the SpaceX Dragon and currently, the Cygnus are the visiting vehicles to attach in this manner. For all other vehicles, the times of docking and undocking are given.

== Future spaceflights ==
Manifested future flights are shown below:

Spacecraft		ISS Flight No.	Mission	Launch vehicle	Scheduled date (UTC)
Progress MS-36	(Russia)	ISS‑97P	Logistics	Soyuz‑2.1a	24 November 2026
Cygnus NG-25	(United States)	CRS NG‑25	Logistics	Falcon 9	29 November 2026
Boeing Starliner-1	(United States)	TBA	Uncrewed cargo flight	Atlas V N22	December 2026
Progress MS-37	(Russia)	ISS‑98P	Logistics	Soyuz‑2.1a	February 2027
Cygnus NG-22	(United States)	CRS NG‑22	Logistics	?	TBA
HTV-X2	(Japan)	HTV‑X2	Logistics	H3-24W	2027
Gaganyaan 2 or 3	(India)	TBA	Rendezvous, Docking, Logistics	HLVM-3	2027
US Deorbit Vehicle	(United States)	?	Deorbit	?	2030

== Spaceports ==
=== Baikonur Cosmodrome ===
Baikonur Cosmodrome in Kazakhstan is the oldest and busiest spaceport. The first module of the ISS was launched from Baikonur Cosmodrome Site 81 as the uncrewed spacecraft Zarya in 1998 and flew uncrewed for about two years before the first crew arrived. The Progress spacecraft is the most frequent cargo ship sent from Baikonur to the station, bringing supplies such as food, fuel, gas, experiments, and parts. Its light payload is offset by its ability to deliver critical replacement parts at short notice. Fresh fruit and vegetables from the earth are an important part of the crew's diet.

=== Tanegashima Space Center ===
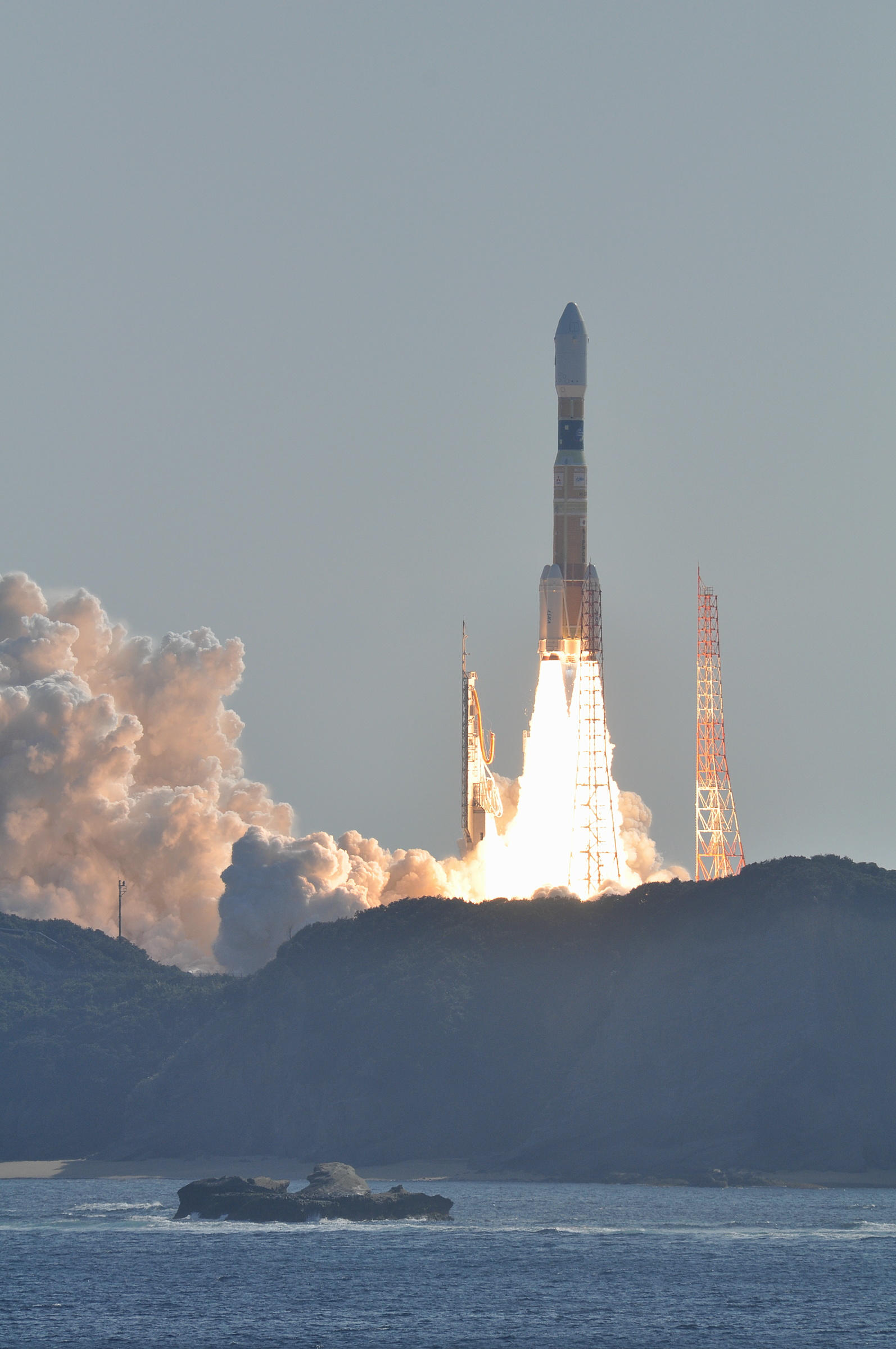
A Kounotori departing Tanegashima Space Center bound for the International Space Station.

Located in Japan on an island 115 kilometres (71 mi) south of Kyūshū, the Tanegashima Space Center (TCS) is the launch site for H-II Transfer Vehicle (HTV), called Kounotori (こうのとり, Oriental stork or white stork) and HTV-X, used to resupply the Kibō Japanese Experiment Module (JEM) and the ISS. The name Kounotori was chosen for the HTV by JAXA because "a white stork carries an image of conveying an important thing (a baby, happiness, and other joyful things), therefore, it precisely expresses the HTV's mission to transport essential materials to the ISS".

White Kounotori can carry 6,000 kilograms (13,000 lb) of cargo in total, about 3,500–4,500 kilograms (7,700–9,900 lb) of which is accessible by the crew in the pressurized section, the remainder is unpressurised cargo on Exposed Pallet to be handled by the ISS's robotic arm.

=== Guiana Space Centre ===
The European Space Agency (ESA) uses the Guiana Space Centre near Kourou in French Guiana. Operational since 1968, it is particularly suitable as a location for a spaceport due to its proximity to the equator, and that launches are in a favorable direction over water. The near-equatorial launch location provides an advantage for launches to low-inclination (or geostationary) Earth orbits compared to launches from spaceports at higher latitude, the eastward boost provided by the Earth's rotation is about 463 metres per second (1,520 ft/s; 1,040 mph) at this spaceport.

The ESA's Automated Transfer Vehicle weighs 20,700 kilograms (45,600 lb) at launch and has a cargo capacity of 8,000 kilograms (18,000 lb) including 1,500 to 5,500 kilograms (3,300 to 12,100 lb) of dry cargo, up to 1,000 kilograms (2,200 lb) of gases (water, nitrogen, oxygen, air), with up to two gases per flight, and up to 4,700 kilograms (10,400 lb) of propellant for boosting and refueling the station.

=== Cape Canaveral Space Force Station ===
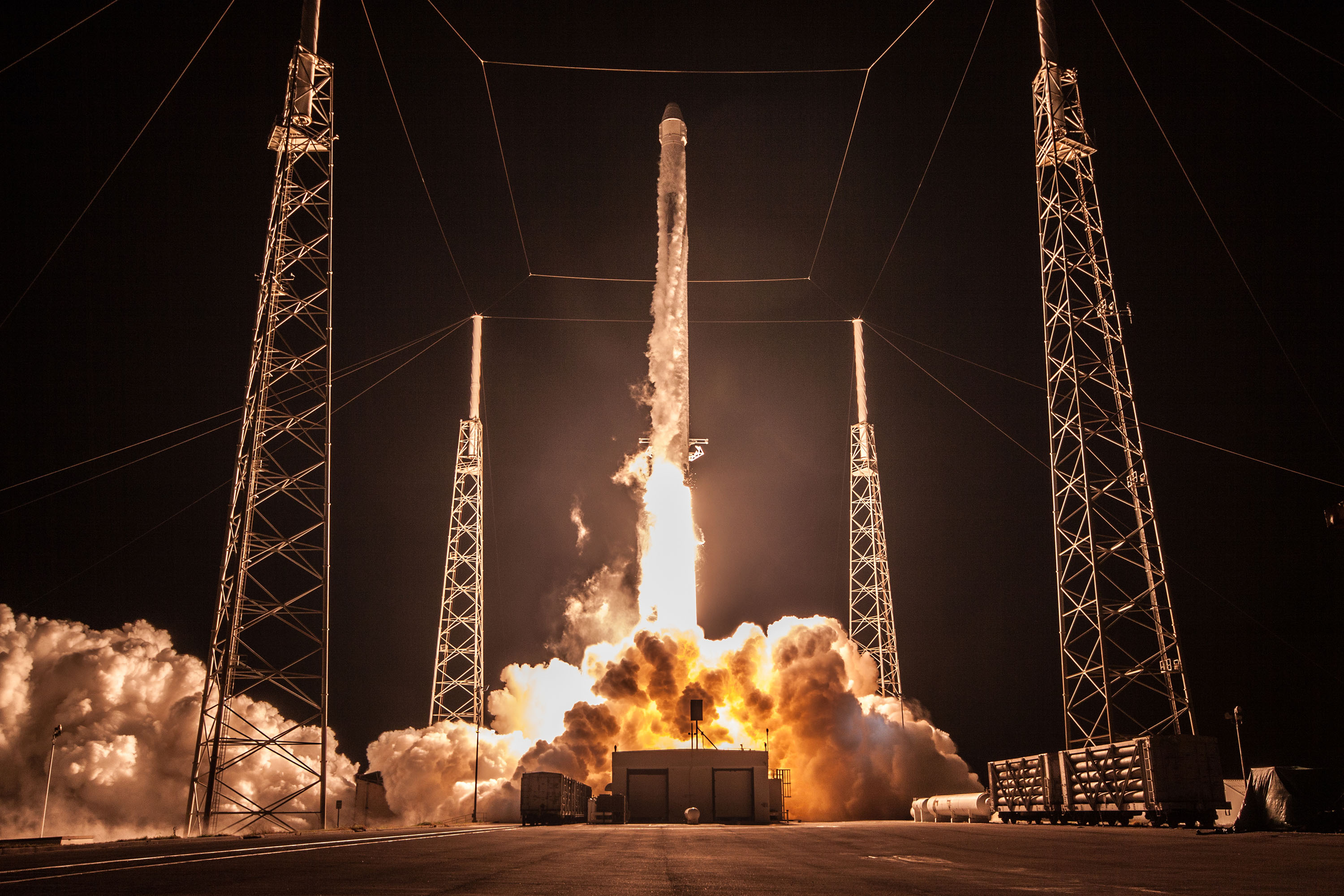
A SpaceX Dragon cargo launch to ISS aboard a Falcon 9.

Cape Canaveral Space Force Station, located in Florida, United States, has been operational since 1950 with its first orbital launch occurring in 1958. All of NASA's crewed Mercury and Gemini missions were launched from the Cape, along with some of the earlier Apollo missions. Cape Canaveral is adjacent to the Kennedy Space Center, where the majority of Apollo missions and all the Space Shuttle missions were launched from. Under contract with NASA, SpaceX launches the Dragon 2 Cargo variant spacecraft to resupply the American portion of the ISS. The Dragon can transport 6,000 kilograms (13,000 lb) of pressurized and unpressurized cargo and can return 3,000 kilograms (6,600 lb) to Earth. It is the only uncrewed resupply vehicle capable of returning a payload.

=== Mid-Atlantic Regional Spaceport ===
The Mid-Atlantic Regional Spaceport, located at Wallops Island, Virginia, United States, is the launch site for the Northrop Grumman Cygnus spacecraft for resupplying the American portion of the ISS.

==== Future ====
- Satish Dhawan Space Centre, located in Sriharikota, an island in Tirupati district of Andhra Pradesh, India, for the upcoming Gaganyaan mission which will send one of the uncrewed vehicle to the ISS in late 2026 or 2027 for rendezvous, docking and logistics purpose.

== See also ==
- List of spaceflights to the International Space Station
- List of human spaceflights to the International Space Station
- List of International Space Station spacewalks
- List of International Space Station visitors
- List of Progress flights
- Comparison of space station cargo vehicles
- Cargo spacecraft
