= Kosmos 2430 =

Russian military satellite

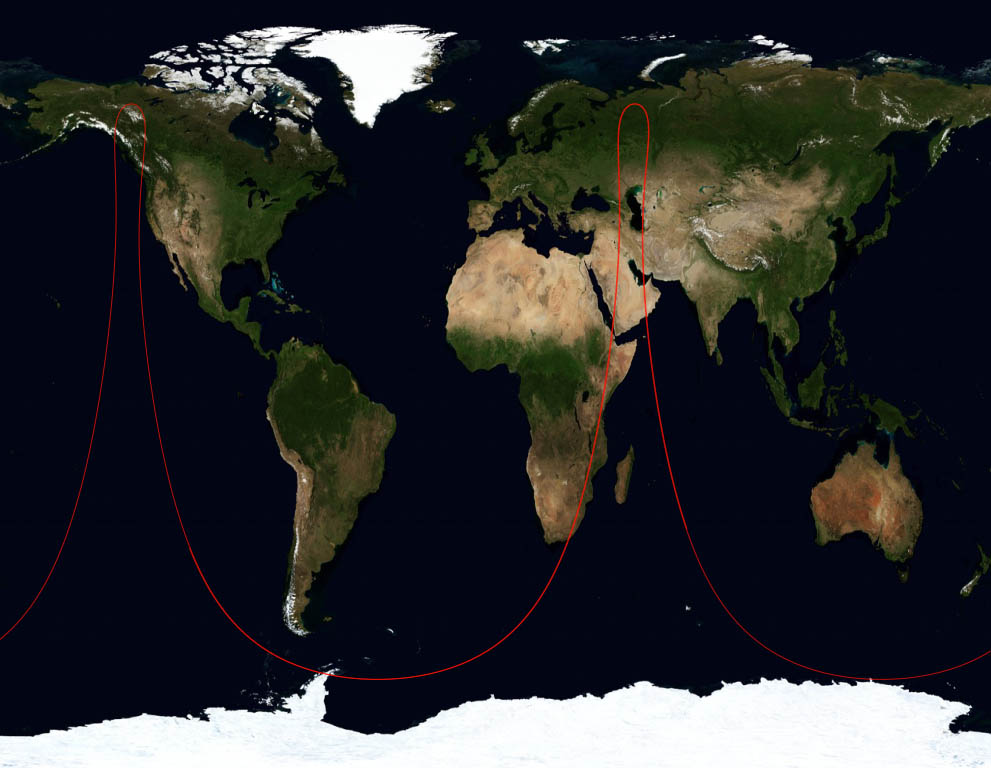
- Ground track of Kosmos 2430 (as of June 5, 2012)
- Mission type: Early warning
- COSPAR ID: 2007-049A
- SATCAT no.: 32268
- Mission duration: 4 years

Spacecraft properties
- Spacecraft type: US-K
- Launch mass: 1,900 kilograms (4,200 lb)

Start of mission
- Launch date: 23 October 2007, 04:39 UTC
- Rocket: Molniya-M/2BL
- Launch site: Plesetsk Cosmodrome

End of mission
- Deactivated: May 2012?
- Decay date: 5 January 2019, 07:58:00 UTC

Orbital parameters
- Reference system: Geocentric
- Regime: Molniya
- Perigee altitude: 519 kilometres (322 mi)
- Apogee altitude: 39,175 kilometres (24,342 mi)
- Inclination: 62.8 degrees
- Period: 704.44 minutes

Kosmos 2430 (Russian: Космос 2430 meaning Cosmos 2430) was a Russian US-K missile early warning satellite which was launched in 2007 as part of the Russian Space Forces' Oko programme. The satellite was designed to identify missile launches using optical telescopes and infrared sensors.

Kosmos 2430 was launched from Site 16/2 at Plesetsk Cosmodrome in Russia. A Molniya-M carrier rocket with a 2BL upper stage was used to perform the launch, which took place at 04:39 UTC on 23 October 2007. The launch successfully placed the satellite into a molniya orbit. It subsequently received its Kosmos designation, and the international designator 2007-049A. The United States Space Command assigned it the Satellite Catalog Number 32268.

In May 2012, it did not perform a manoeuvre and drifted off station.

On 5 January 2019, it was caught on video as it de-orbited over the North Island of New Zealand.

== See also ==
- List of Kosmos satellites (2251–2500)
- List of R-7 launches (2005–2009)
- 2007 in spaceflight
- List of Oko satellites
