= Progress M-52 =

Russian cargo spacecraft

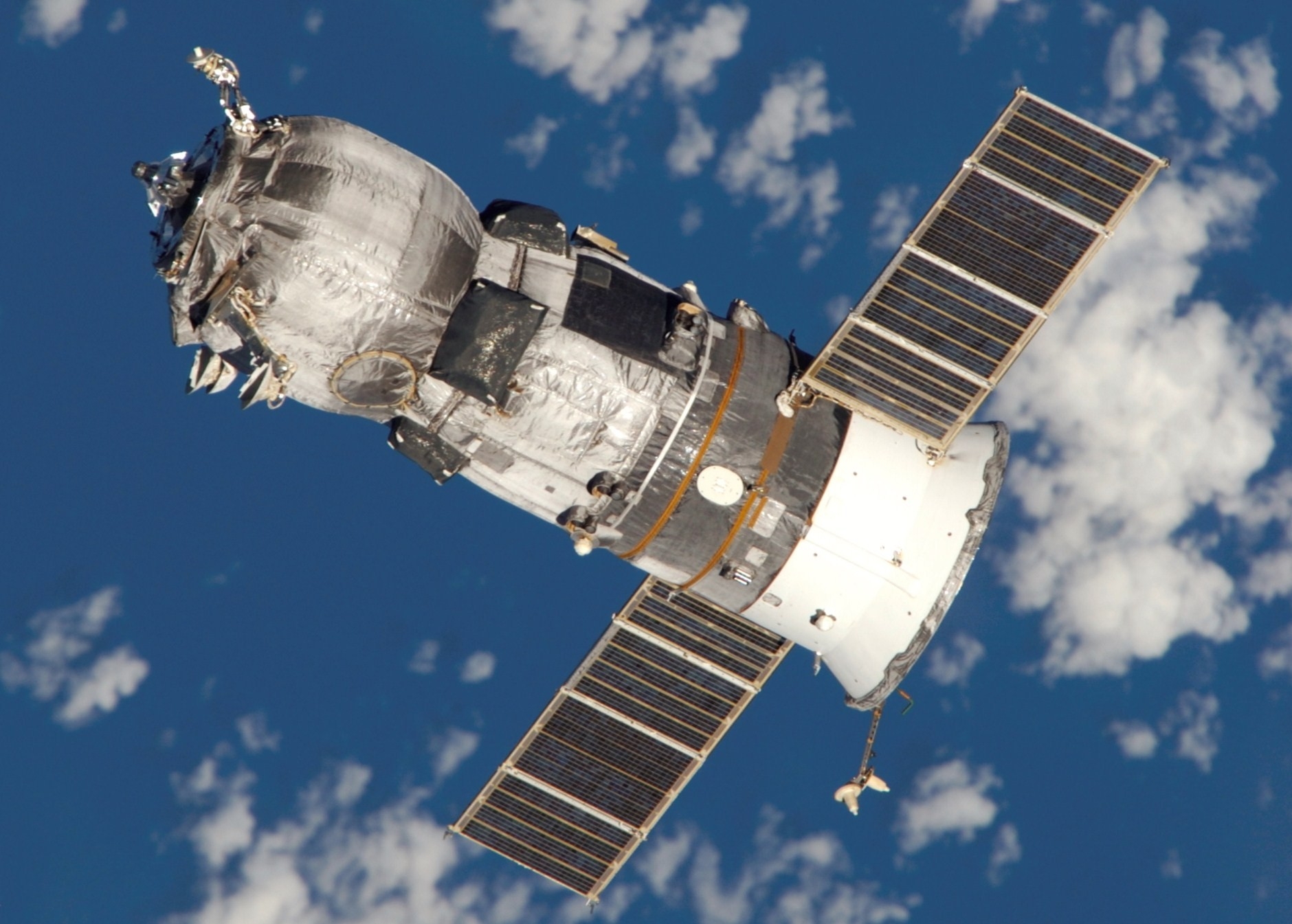
- Progress M-52 departing the ISS.
- Mission type: ISS resupply
- Operator: Roskosmos
- COSPAR ID: 2005-007A
- SATCAT no.: 28624
- Mission duration: 108 days

Spacecraft properties
- Spacecraft type: Progress-M s/n 352
- Manufacturer: RKK Energia

Start of mission
- Launch date: 28 February 2005, 19:09:18 UTC
- Rocket: Soyuz-U
- Launch site: Baikonur, Site 1/5

End of mission
- Disposal: Deorbited
- Decay date: 16 June 2005, 00:02:41 UTC

Orbital parameters
- Reference system: Geocentric
- Regime: Low Earth
- Perigee altitude: 193 km
- Apogee altitude: 245 km
- Inclination: 51.7°
- Period: 88.6 minutes
- Epoch: 28 February 2005

Docking with ISS
- Docking port: Zvezda aft
- Docking date: 2 March 2005, 20:10:08 UTC
- Undocking date: 15 June 2005, 20:16:10 UTC
- Time docked: 105 days

Cargo
- Mass: 2500 kg
- Progress ISS Resupply

Progress M-52 (Russian: Прогресс М-52), identified by NASA as Progress 17P, was a Progress spacecraft used to resupply the International Space Station. It was a Progress-M 11F615A55 spacecraft, with the serial number 352.

== Launch ==
Progress M-52 was launched by a Soyuz-U carrier rocket from Site 1/5 at the Baikonur Cosmodrome. Launch occurred at 19:09:18 UTC on 28 February 2005.

== Docking ==
The spacecraft docked with the port of the Zvezda aft module at 20:10:08 UTC on 2 March 2005. It remained docked for 105 days before undocking at 20:16:10 UTC on 15 June 2005 to make way for Progress M-53. It was deorbited at 23:16:00 UTC on 15 June 2005. The spacecraft burned up in the atmosphere over the Pacific Ocean, with any remaining debris landing in the ocean at around 00:02:41 UTC on 16 June 2005.

Progress M-52 carried supplies to the International Space Station, including food, water and oxygen for the crew and equipment for conducting scientific research. It also carried the TNS-0 (2005-007C) nanosatellite, which was deployed from the ISS on 28 February 2005 at 19:09:18 UTC.

== See also ==
- List of Progress flights
- Uncrewed spaceflights to the International Space Station
