= Progress M-66 =

Spacecraft

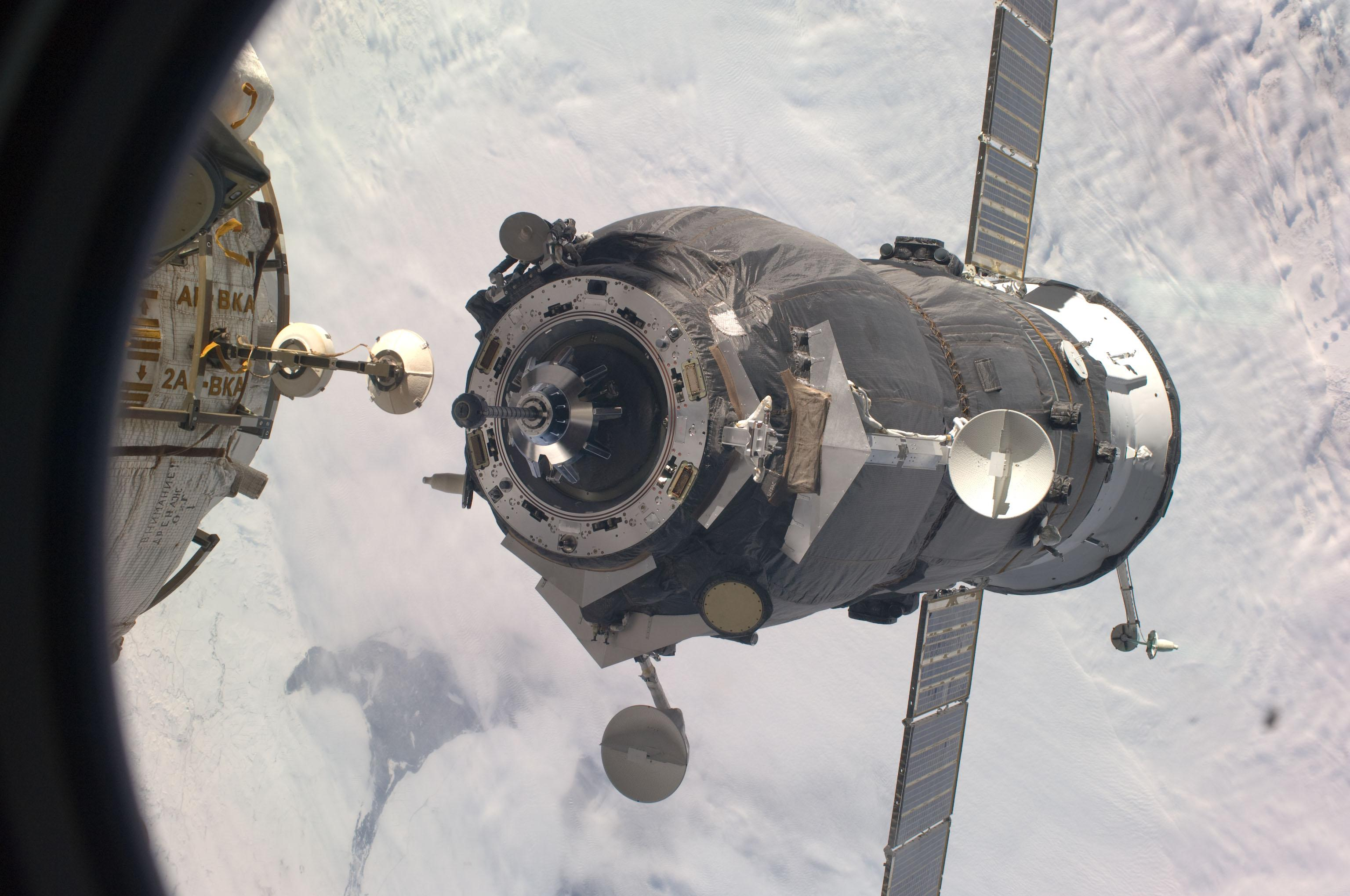
- Progress M-66 docking with the ISS.
- Mission type: ISS resupply
- Operator: Roskosmos
- COSPAR ID: 2009-006A
- SATCAT no.: 33593
- Mission duration: 97 days

Spacecraft properties
- Spacecraft type: Progress-M s/n 366
- Manufacturer: RKK Energia

Start of mission
- Launch date: 10 February 2009, 05:49 UTC
- Rocket: Soyuz-U
- Launch site: Baikonur, Site 31/6

End of mission
- Disposal: Deorbited
- Decay date: 18 May 2009, 15:14:45 UTC

Orbital parameters
- Reference system: Geocentric
- Regime: Low Earth
- Inclination: 51.6°
- Epoch: 10 February 2009

Docking with ISS
- Docking port: Pirs
- Docking date: 13 February 2009, 07:18 UTC
- Undocking date: 6 May 2009, 15:18 UTC
- Time docked: 82 days

Cargo
- Pressurised: 1300 kg (dry cargo)
- Fuel: 870 kg
- Gaseous: 50 kg (oxygen) and air
- Progress ISS Resupply

Progress M-66 (Russian: Прогресс М-66), identified by NASA as Progress 32P, was a Progress spacecraft used to resupply the International Space Station. It was the penultimate flight of the Progress-M 11F615A55 spacecraft, using the spacecraft with the serial number 366.

== Launch ==
Progress M-66 was launched at 05:49 UTC on 10 February 2009, by a Soyuz-U carrier rocket flying from Site 31/6 at the Baikonur Cosmodrome. This was the first time Site 31 had been used for a Progress launch since Progress M-15 in 1992.

== Docking ==
The spacecraft docked with the Pirs module of the ISS at 07:18 UTC on 13 February 2009. It undocked at 15:18 UTC on 6 May 2009, to make way for Progress M-02M. It was deorbited at 14:28:30 UTC on 18 May 2009 following twelve days of free flight, during which it conducted experiments as part of the Plazma-Progress programme. Any debris from Progress M-66 that survived re-entry landed in the Pacific Ocean at around 15:14:45 UTC.

== Cargo ==
Progress M-66 delivered supplies to the International Space Station, including fuel, food and water for the crew, and equipment for conducting scientific research and establishing a 6-man crew capacity aboard the ISS. It also carried a new Orlan-MK spacesuit to replace one of the older Orlan-M suits previously used for EVAs from the station.

== See also ==
- List of Progress flights
- Uncrewed spaceflights to the International Space Station
