= Progress M-60 =

Russian cargo spacecraft

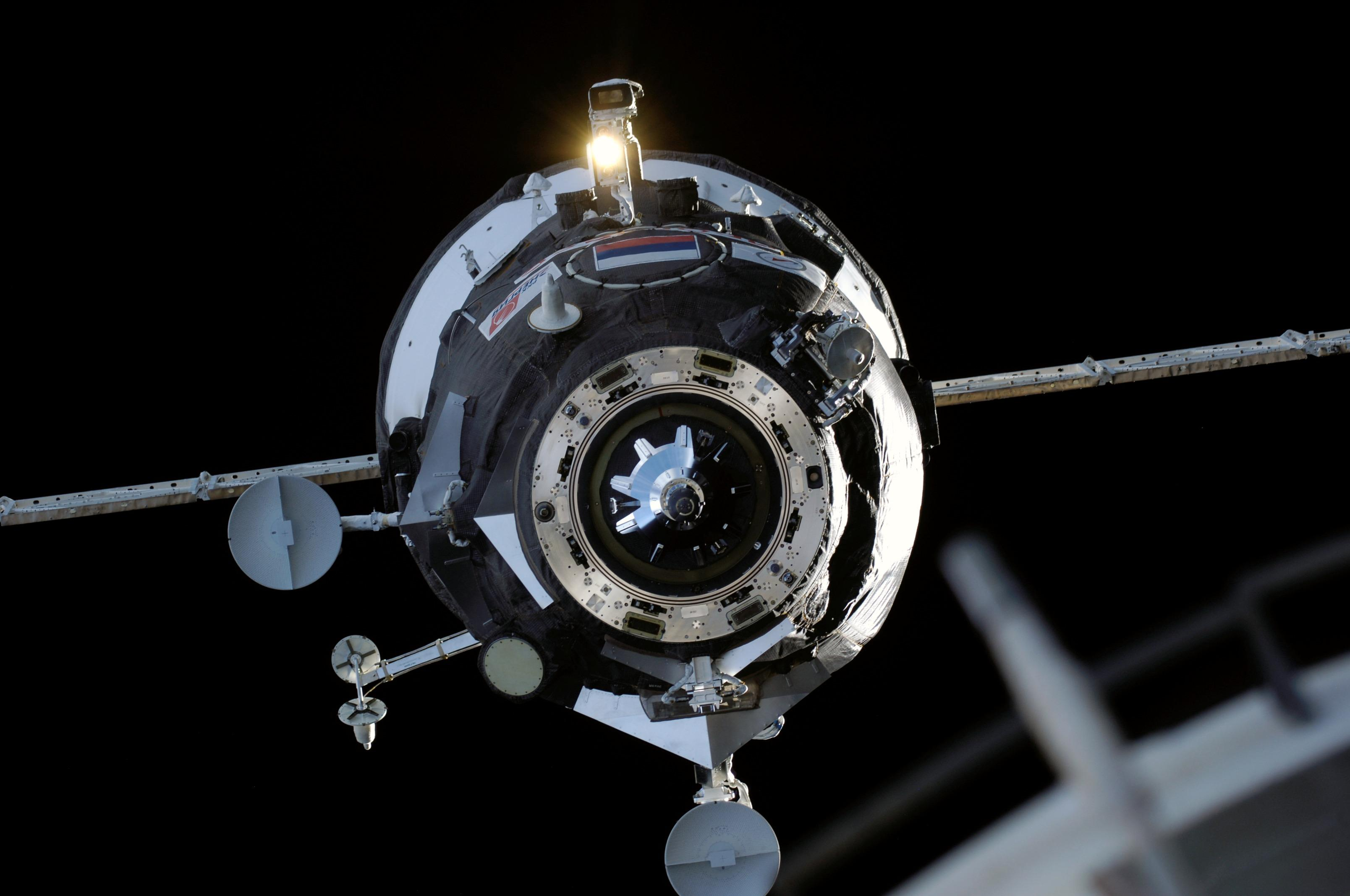
- Progress M-60 approaching the ISS
- Mission type: ISS resupply
- Operator: Roskosmos
- COSPAR ID: 2007-017A
- SATCAT no.: 31393
- Mission duration: 136 days

Spacecraft properties
- Spacecraft type: Progress-M s/n 360
- Manufacturer: RKK Energia

Start of mission
- Launch date: 12 May 2007, 03:25:36 UTC
- Rocket: Soyuz-U
- Launch site: Baikonur, Site 1/5

End of mission
- Disposal: Deorbited
- Decay date: 25 September 2007, 19:47 UTC

Orbital parameters
- Reference system: Geocentric
- Regime: Low Earth
- Inclination: 51.6°
- Epoch: 12 May 2007

Docking with ISS
- Docking port: Zvezda aft
- Docking date: 15 May 2007, 05:10 UTC
- Undocking date: 19 September 2007, 00:36:51 UTC
- Time docked: 127 days

Cargo
- Mass: 1400 kg (dry cargo)
- Pressurised: 241 kg (fruits and vegetables)
- Fuel: 136 kg (medical equipment)
- Gaseous: 45 kg (air)
- Water: 419 kg
- Progress ISS Resupply

Progress M-60 (Russian: Прогресс М-60), identified by NASA as Progress 25P, was a Progress spacecraft used to resupply the International Space Station. It was a Progress-M 11F615A55 spacecraft, with the serial number 360.

== Launch ==
Progress M-60 was launched by a Soyuz-U carrier rocket from Site 1/5 at the Baikonur Cosmodrome. Launch occurred at 03:25:36 UTC on 12 May 2007.

== Docking ==
The spacecraft docked with the Aft port of the Zvezda module at 05:10 UTC on 15 May. It remained docked for 127 days before undocking at 00:36:51 UTC on 19 September 2007. Following undocking it conducted research as part of the Plazma-Progress programme for a week prior to being deorbited. It was deorbited at 19:01 UTC on 25 September 2007. The spacecraft burned up in the atmosphere over the Pacific Ocean, with any remaining debris landing in the ocean at around 19:47 UTC.

Progress M-60 carried supplies to the International Space Station, including food, water and oxygen for the crew and equipment for conducting scientific research.

== See also ==
- List of Progress flights
- Uncrewed spaceflights to the International Space Station
