= Progress M-58 =

Russian cargo spacecraft

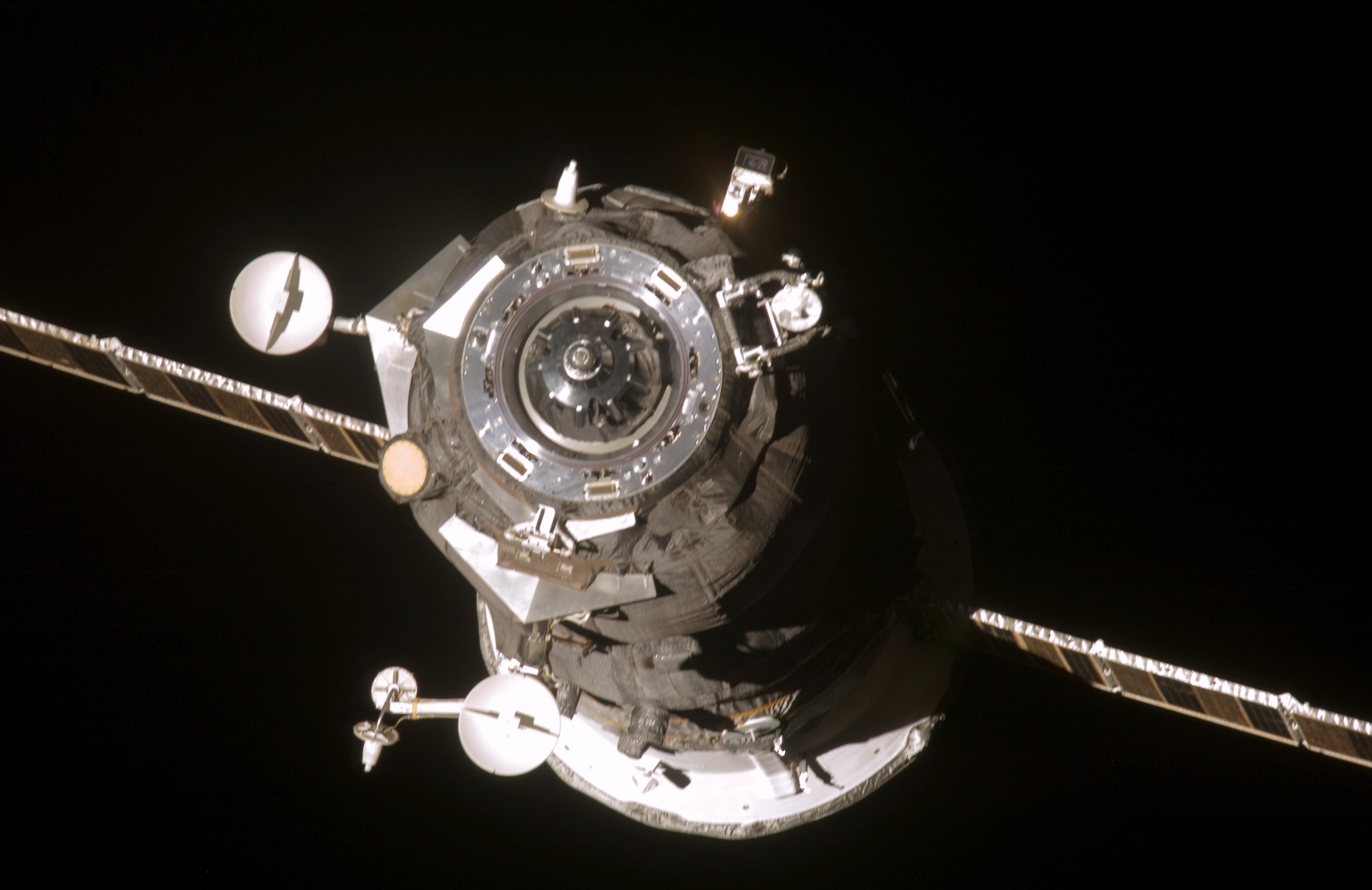
- Progress M-58 undocking from the ISS.
- Mission type: ISS resupply
- Operator: Roskosmos
- COSPAR ID: 2006-045A
- SATCAT no.: 29503
- Mission duration: 155 days

Spacecraft properties
- Spacecraft type: Progress-M s/n 358
- Manufacturer: RKK Energia

Start of mission
- Launch date: 23 October 2006, 13:40:36 UTC
- Rocket: Soyuz-U
- Launch site: Baikonur, Site 1/5

End of mission
- Disposal: Deorbited
- Decay date: 27 March 2007, 23:30:22 UTC

Orbital parameters
- Reference system: Geocentric
- Regime: Low Earth
- Perigee altitude: km
- Apogee altitude: km
- Inclination: 51.6°
- Period: minutes
- Epoch: 23 October 2006

Docking with ISS
- Docking port: Zvezda aft
- Docking date: 26 October 2006, 14:28:46 UTC
- Undocking date: 27 March 2007, 18:11 UTC
- Time docked: 152 days

Cargo
- Mass: 2200 kg
- Fuel: 870 kg
- Progress ISS Resupply

Progress M-58 (Russian: Прогресс М-58), identified by NASA as Progress 23P, was a Progress spacecraft used to resupply the International Space Station. It was a Progress-M 11F615A55 spacecraft, with the serial number 358.

== Launch ==
Progress M-58 was launched by a Soyuz-U carrier rocket from Site 1/5 at the Baikonur Cosmodrome. Launch occurred at 13:40:36 UTC on 23 October 2006.

== Docking ==
The spacecraft docked with the aft port of the Zvezda module at 14:28:46 UTC on 26 October 2006. During docking a problem with the spacecraft's telemetry system produced a false reading that an antenna associated with its Kurs docking system had failed to retract, complicating the docking procedure. It remained docked for 152 days before undocking at 18:11 UTC on 27 March 2007. It was deorbited at 22:44:30 UTC on 27 March 2007. The spacecraft burned up in the atmosphere over the Pacific Ocean, with any remaining debris landing in the ocean at around 23:30:22 GMT.

Progress M-58 carried supplies to the International Space Station, including food, water and oxygen for the crew and equipment for conducting scientific research.

== See also ==
- List of Progress flights
- Uncrewed spaceflights to the International Space Station
