= Progress M-65 =

Russian spacecraft

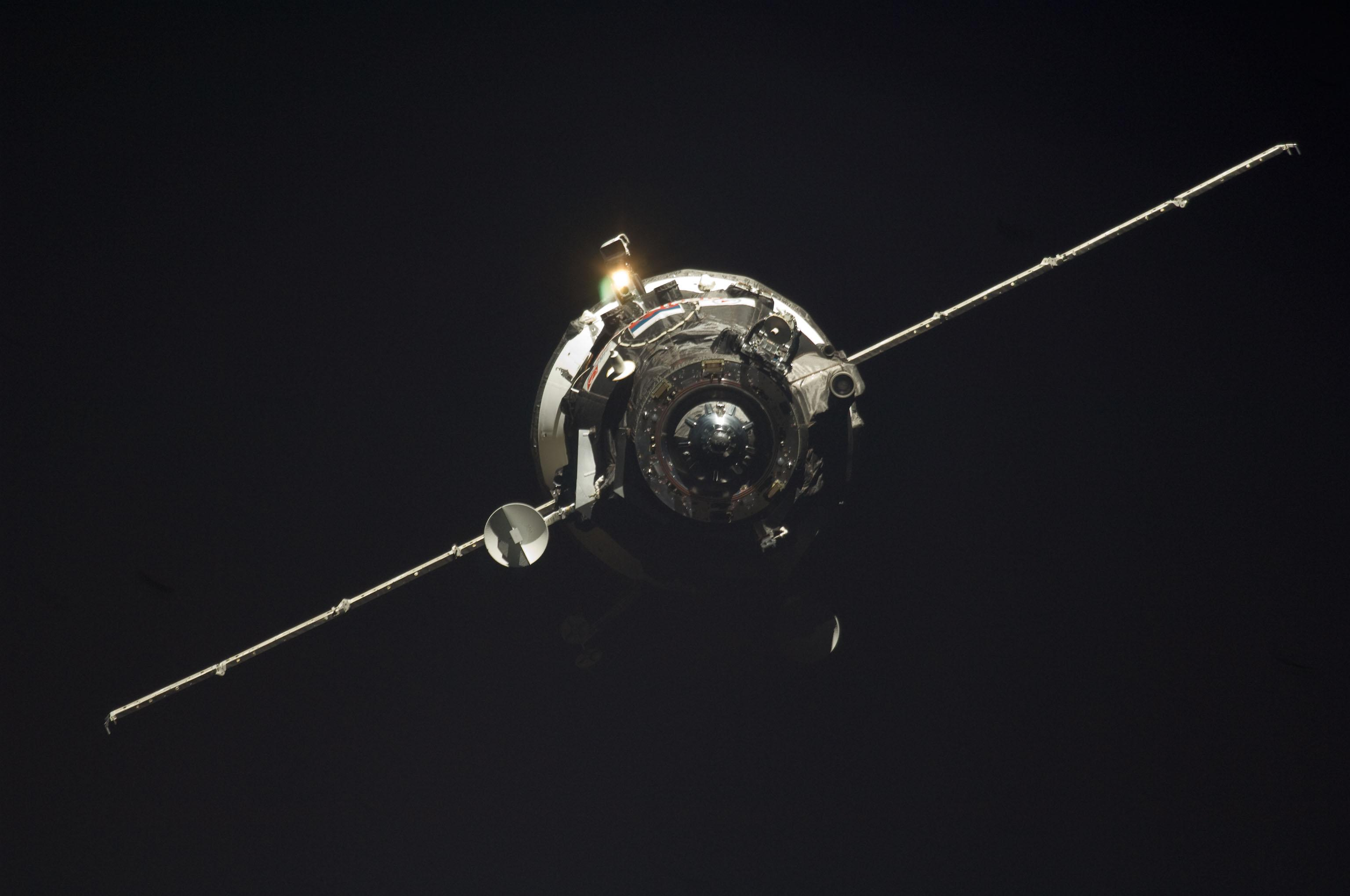
- Progress M-65 approaching the ISS.
- Mission type: ISS resupply
- Operator: Roskosmos
- COSPAR ID: 2008-043A
- SATCAT no.: 33340
- Mission duration: 89 days

Spacecraft properties
- Spacecraft type: Progress-M s/n 365
- Manufacturer: RKK Energia

Start of mission
- Launch date: 10 September 2008, 19:50 UTC
- Rocket: Soyuz-U
- Launch site: Baikonur, Site 1/5

End of mission
- Disposal: Deorbited
- Decay date: 8 December 2008, 08:49 UTC

Orbital parameters
- Reference system: Geocentric
- Regime: Low Earth
- Perigee altitude: 348 km
- Apogee altitude: 357 km
- Inclination: 51.6°
- Period: 91.6 minutes
- Epoch: 10 September 2008

Docking with ISS
- Docking port: Zvezda aft
- Docking date: 17 September 2008, 18:43 UTC
- Undocking date: 15 November 2008, 16:19 UTC
- Time docked: 59 days

Cargo
- Mass: 2800 kg
- Progress ISS Resupply

Progress M-65 (Russian: Прогресс М-65), identified by NASA as Progress 30P, was a Progress spacecraft used to resupply the International Space Station. It was a Progress-M 11F615A55 spacecraft, with the serial number 365.

== Launch ==
Progress M-65 was launched by a Soyuz-U carrier rocket from Site 1/5 at the Baikonur Cosmodrome. Launch occurred at 19:50 UTC on 10 September 2008.

== Docking ==
The spacecraft docked with the aft port of the Zvezda module at 18:43 UTC on 17 September 2008. Docking had originally been scheduled for 21:01 GMT on 12 September 2008, but was delayed after Hurricane Ike forced NASA to close the Johnson Space Center, which houses the US mission control centre for the ISS. A backup facility at the Marshall Space Flight Center was used during the docking. Following undocking at 16:19 UTC on 15 November 2008, it conducted a Plazma-Progress experiment. It was deorbited on 8 December 2008, with the 142 second deorbit burn beginning at 08:02 UTC. The spacecraft burned up in the atmosphere over the Pacific Ocean, with any remaining debris landing in the ocean at around 08:49 UTC.

== Cargo ==
Progress M-65 carried supplies to the International Space Station, including food, water and oxygen for the crew and equipment for conducting scientific research. It also carried a new Orlan-MK spacesuit to replace one of the older Orlan-M suits previously used for EVAs from the station.

== See also ==
- List of Progress flights
- Uncrewed spaceflights to the International Space Station
