= Progress M-03M =

Spacecraft

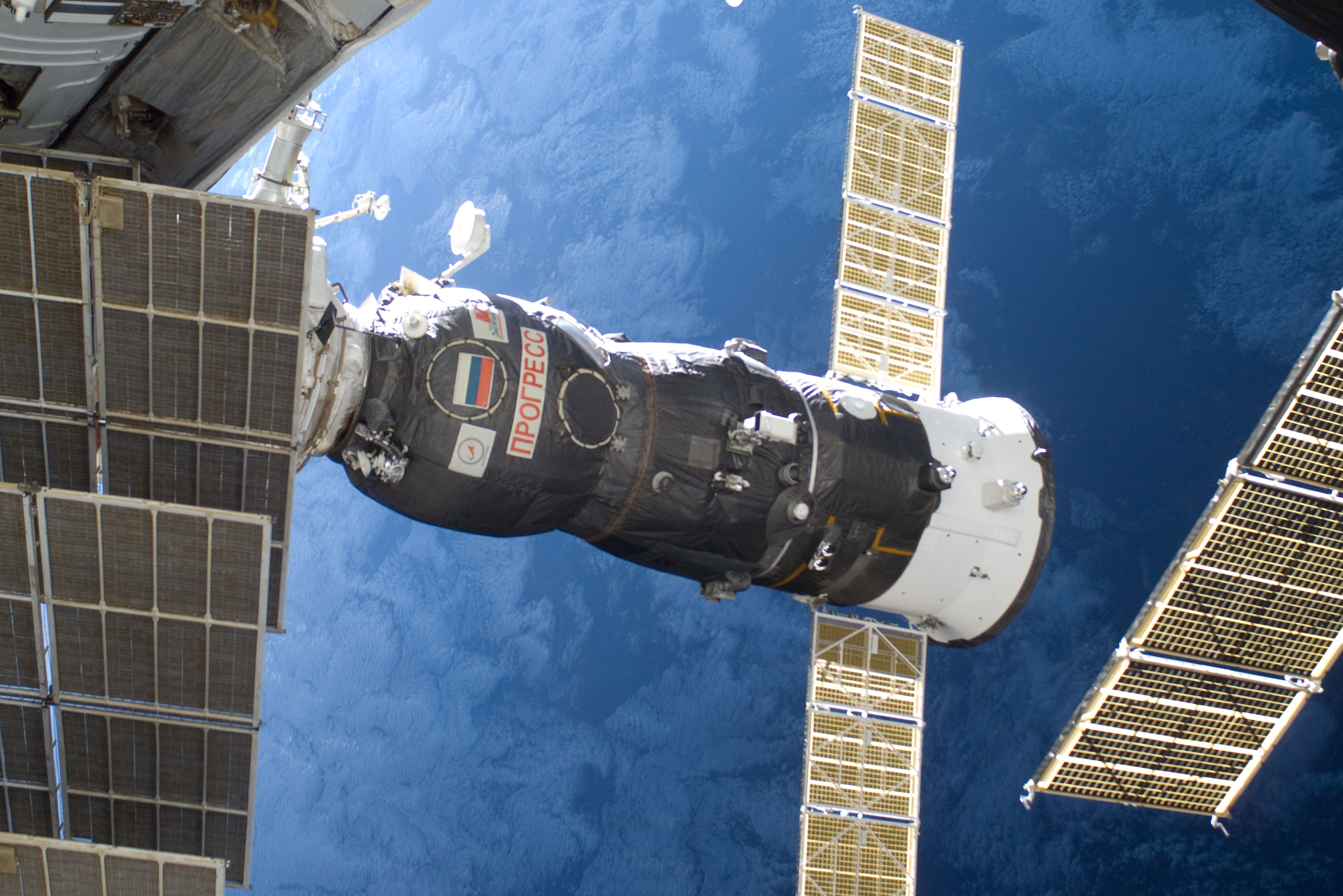
- Progress M-03M is docked to the ISS.
- Mission type: ISS resupply
- Operator: Roskosmos
- COSPAR ID: 2009-056A
- SATCAT no.: 35948
- Mission duration: 194 days

Spacecraft properties
- Spacecraft type: Progress-M s/n 403
- Manufacturer: RKK Energia

Start of mission
- Launch date: 15 October 2009, 01:14 UTC
- Rocket: Soyuz-U
- Launch site: Baikonur, Site 1/5

End of mission
- Disposal: Deorbited
- Decay date: 27 April 2010

Orbital parameters
- Reference system: Geocentric
- Regime: Low Earth
- Perigee altitude: 291 km
- Apogee altitude: 336 km
- Inclination: 51.6°
- Period: 90.79 minutes
- Epoch: 15 October 2009

Docking with ISS
- Docking port: Pirs
- Docking date: 18 October 2009, 01:40 UTC
- Undocking date: 22 April 2010, 16:32 UTC
- Time docked: 186 days

Cargo
- Mass: 2000 kg
- Pressurised: 790 kg
- Fuel: 870 kg
- Water: 420 kg
- Progress ISS Resupply

Progress M-03M (Russian: Прогресс М-03М), identified by NASA as Progress 35P, was a Progress spacecraft used by the Russian Federal Space Agency to resupply the International Space Station (ISS).

== Launch ==
Progress M-03M launched on a Soyuz-U carrier rocket, flying from Site 1/5 at the Baikonur Cosmodrome. Liftoff took place at 01:14 UTC on 15 October 2009.

== Docking ==
Docking with the Pirs module of the ISS took place on 18 October 2009 at 01:40 UTC.

== Cargo ==
Progress M-03M delivered 790 kg (1750 lb) of dry cargo, 870 kg (1918 lb) of propellant and 420 kg (926 lb) of water.

== Undocking ==
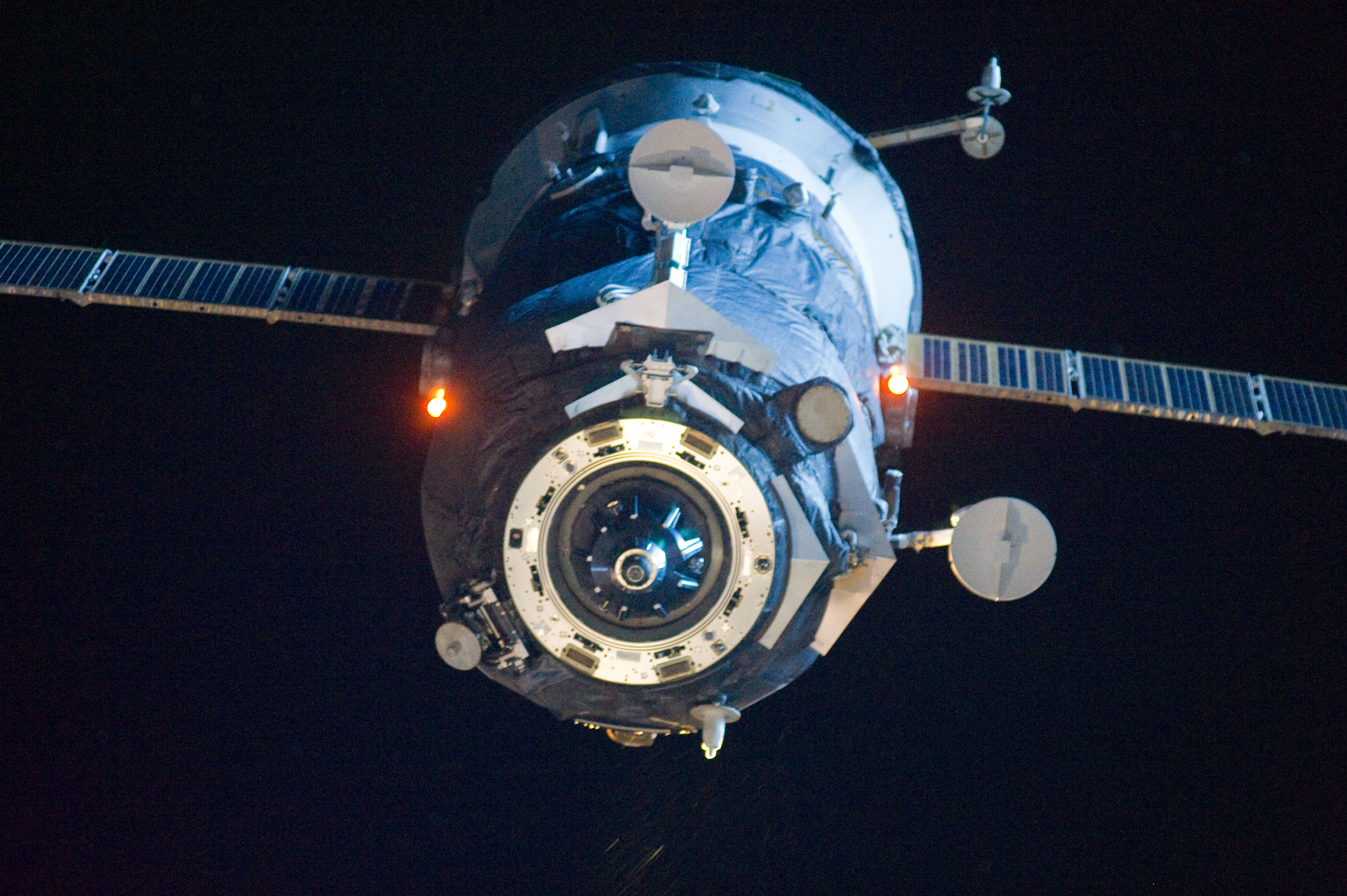
Progress M-03M departs the ISS.

The spacecraft undocked from Pirs on 22 April 2010. Filled with trash and discarded space station items, the Progress ship was used for scientific experiments until it was deorbited, entering the Earth's atmosphere and burning up over the Pacific Ocean. The deorbit burn occurred at 18:07 UTC on 27 April 2010.

== See also ==
- List of Progress flights
- Uncrewed spaceflights to the International Space Station
