= Progress M-53 =

Russian spacecraft

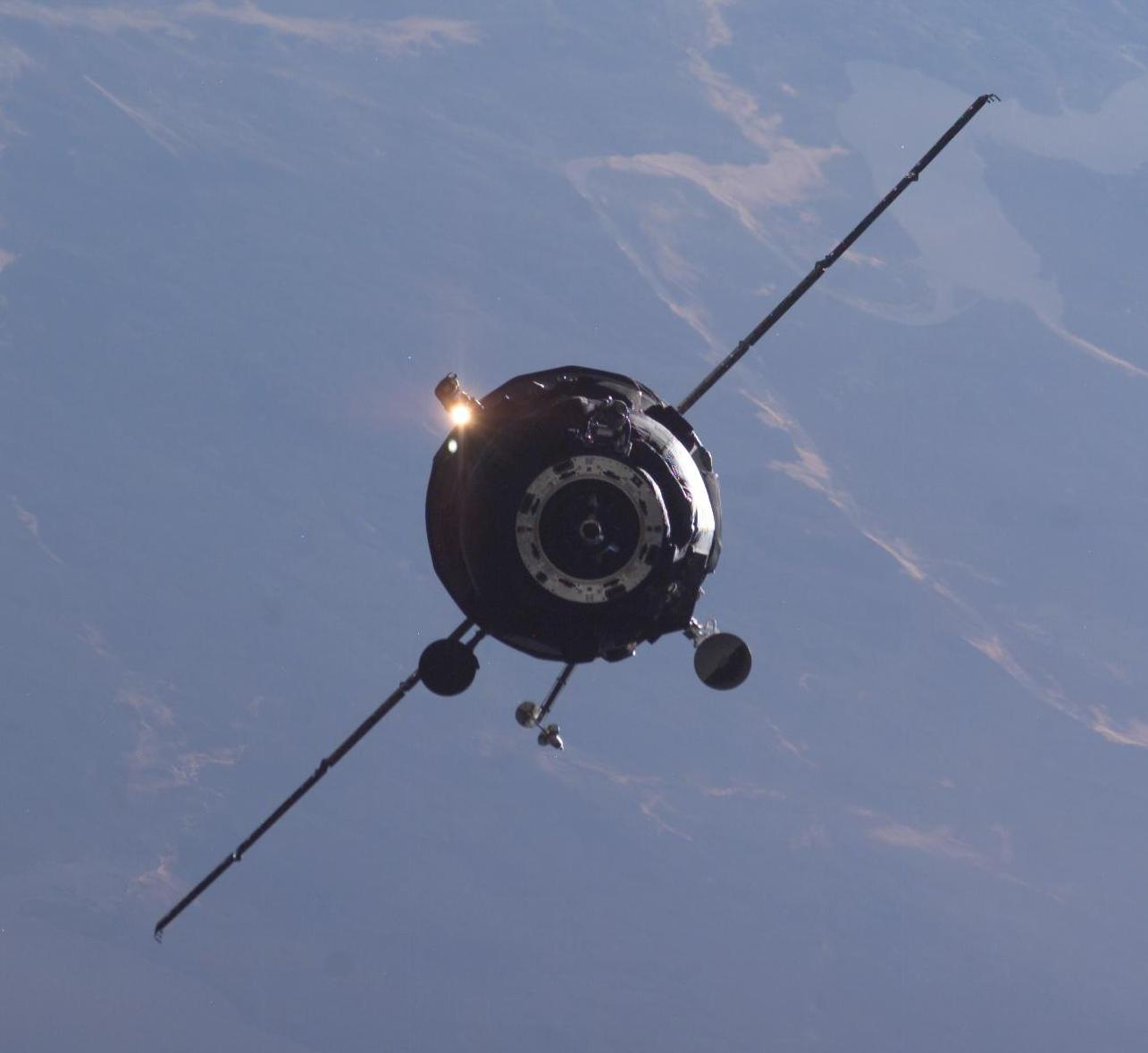
- Progress M-53 approaching the ISS.
- Mission type: ISS resupply
- Operator: Roskosmos
- COSPAR ID: 2005-021A
- SATCAT no.: 28700
- Mission duration: 83 days

Spacecraft properties
- Spacecraft type: Progress-M s/n 353
- Manufacturer: RKK Energia

Start of mission
- Launch date: 16 June 2005, 23:09:34 UTC
- Rocket: Soyuz-U
- Launch site: Baikonur, Site 1/5

End of mission
- Disposal: Deorbited
- Decay date: 7 September 2005, 14:12:40 UTC

Orbital parameters
- Reference system: Geocentric
- Regime: Low Earth
- Perigee altitude: 351 km
- Apogee altitude: 353 km
- Inclination: 51.6°
- Period: 91.0 minutes

Docking with ISS
- Docking port: Zvezda aft
- Docking date: 19 June 2005, 00:41:31 UTC
- Undocking date: 7 September 2005, 10:25:57 UTC
- Time docked: 80 days

Cargo
- Mass: 2500 kg
- Progress ISS Resupply

Progress M-53 (Russian: Прогресс М-53), identified by NASA as Progress 18P, was a Progress spacecraft used to resupply the International Space Station. It was a Progress-M 11F615A55 spacecraft, with the serial number 353.

== Launch ==
Progress M-53 was launched by a Soyuz-U carrier rocket from Site 1/5 at the Baikonur Cosmodrome. Launch occurred at 23:09:34 UTC on 16 June 2005.

== Docking ==
The spacecraft docked with the aft port of the Zvezda module at 00:41:31 UTC on 19 June 2005. The docking was conducted using the backup TORU system, under the control of cosmonaut Sergei Krikalev, due to a power failure at one of the spacecraft's ground control stations. It remained docked for 80 days before undocking at 10:25:57 UTC on 7 September 2005 to make way for Progress M-54. It was deorbited at 13:26:00 UTC on 7 September 2005. The spacecraft burned up in the atmosphere over the Pacific Ocean, with any remaining debris landing in the ocean at around 14:12:40 UTC.

Progress M-53 carried supplies to the International Space Station, including food, water and oxygen for the crew and equipment for conducting scientific research.

== See also ==
- List of Progress flights
- Uncrewed spaceflights to the International Space Station
