= Progress M-02M =

Cargo spacecraft

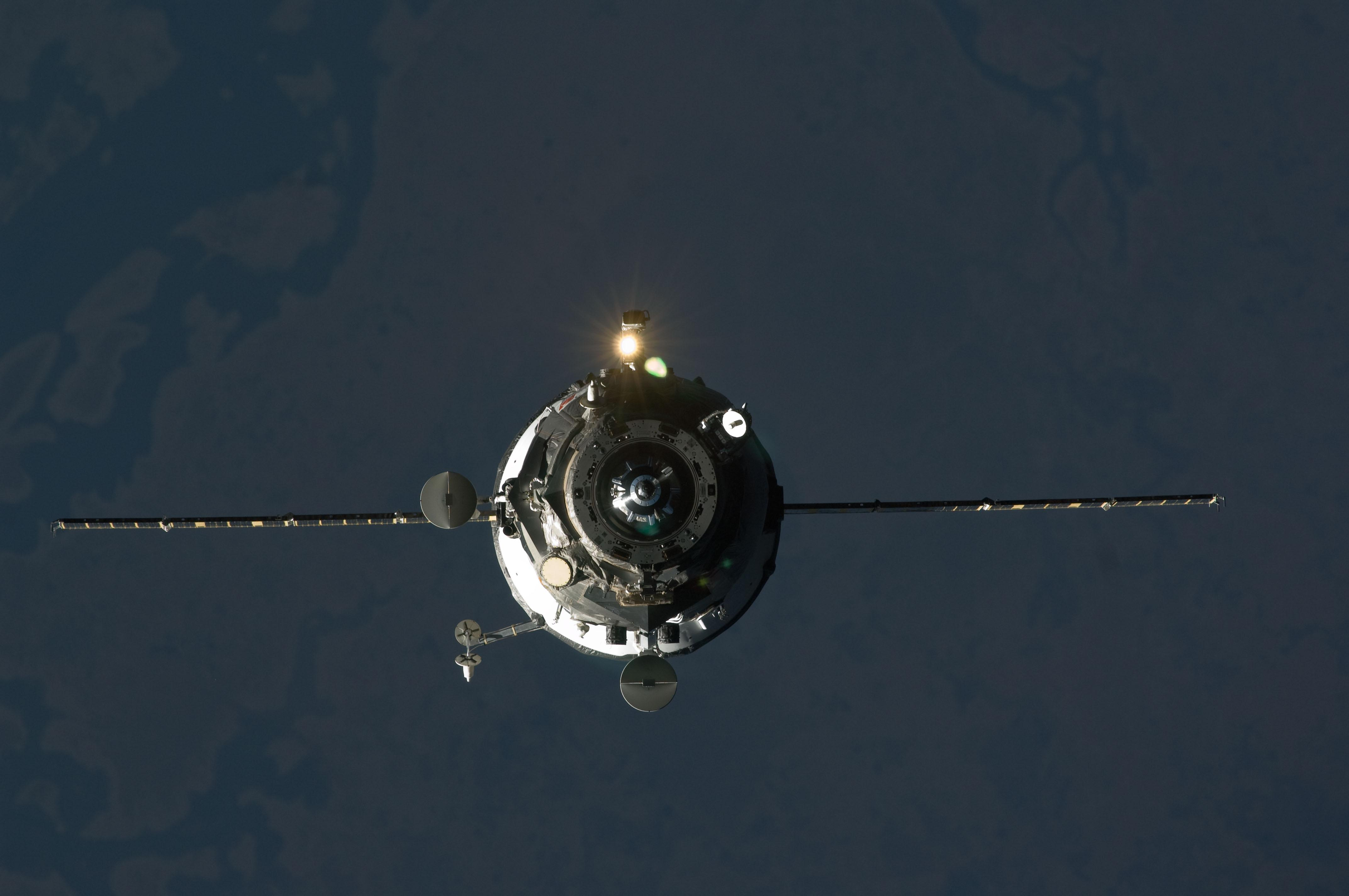
- Progress M-02M approaching the ISS.
- Mission type: ISS resupply
- Operator: Roskosmos
- COSPAR ID: 2009-024A
- SATCAT no.: 34905
- Mission duration: 67 days

Spacecraft properties
- Spacecraft type: Progress-M s/n 402
- Manufacturer: RKK Energia

Start of mission
- Launch date: 7 May 2009, 18:37:09 UTC
- Rocket: Soyuz-U
- Launch site: Baikonur, Site 1/5

End of mission
- Disposal: Deorbited
- Decay date: 13 July 2009, 16:28:47 UTC

Orbital parameters
- Reference system: Geocentric
- Regime: Low Earth
- Perigee altitude: 291 km
- Apogee altitude: 336 km
- Inclination: 51.6°
- Period: 90.79 minutes
- Epoch: 7 May 2009

Docking with ISS
- Docking port: Pirs
- Docking date: 12 May 2009, 19:24:23 UTC
- Undocking date: 30 June 2009, 18:29:43 UTC
- Time docked: 54 days
- Progress ISS Resupply

Progress M-02M (Russian: Прогресс М-02М), identified by NASA as Progress 33P, was a Progress spacecraft which was used to resupply the International Space Station during 2009. It was the second Progress-M 11F615A60 spacecraft, and had the serial number 402.

== Launch ==
Progress M-02M was launched by a Soyuz-U carrier rocket, flying from Site 1/5 at the Baikonur Cosmodrome. The launch occurred at 18:37 UTC on 7 May 2009.

== Docking ==
Docking with the Pirs module of the ISS occurred at 19:24 UTC on 12 May 2009. On 30 June 2009, it undocked from the Station to begin a series of scientific experiments, having first been loaded with cargo for disposal, including two Orlan-M spacesuits. It subsequently performed a second rendezvous with the ISS on 12 July 2009 to test docking systems installed for the arrival of Mini-Research Module 2. It approached to a distance of 10–12 metres (33–39 ft) from the zenith port of the Zvezda module, with the closest approach occurring at 17:15 UTC. Following this test, it backed away from the station. At 15:43 UTC on 13 July 2009 it performed its deorbit burn, and it burned up in the atmosphere over the Pacific Ocean at 16:28:47 UTC.

== See also ==
- List of Progress flights
- Uncrewed spaceflights to the International Space Station
