= Progress M-54 =

Russian spacecraft

- Mission type: ISS resupply
- Operator: Roskosmos
- COSPAR ID: 2005-035A
- SATCAT no.: 28866
- Mission duration: 177 days

Spacecraft properties
- Spacecraft type: Progress-M s/n 354
- Manufacturer: RKK Energia

Start of mission
- Launch date: 8 September 2005, 13:07:54 UTC
- Rocket: Soyuz-U
- Launch site: Baikonur, Site 1/5

End of mission
- Disposal: Deorbited
- Decay date: 3 March 2006, 13:52:18 UTC

Orbital parameters
- Reference system: Geocentric
- Regime: Low Earth
- Perigee altitude: 348 km
- Apogee altitude: 350 km
- Inclination: 51.6°
- Period: 91.5 minutes
- Epoch: 8 September 2005

Docking with ISS
- Docking port: Zvezda aft
- Docking date: 10 September 2005, 14:42:03 UTC
- Undocking date: 3 March 2006, 10:06:10 UTC
- Time docked: 175 days

Cargo
- Mass: 2400 kg
- Progress ISS Resupply

Progress M-54 (Russian: Прогресс М-54), identified by NASA as Progress 19P, was a Progress spacecraft used to resupply the International Space Station. It was a Progress-M 11F615A55 spacecraft, with the serial number 354.

== Launch ==
Progress M-54 was launched by a Soyuz-U carrier rocket from Site 1/5 at the Baikonur Cosmodrome. Launch occurred at 13:07:54 UTC on 8 September 2005.

== Docking ==
The spacecraft docked with the aft port of the Zvezda module at 14:42:03 UTC on 10 September 2005. It remained docked for 175 days before undocking at 10:06:10 UTC on 3 March 2006. It was deorbited at 13:05:00 UTC on 3 March 2006. The spacecraft burned up in the atmosphere over the Pacific Ocean, with any remaining debris landing in the ocean at around 13:52:18 UTC.

Progress M-54 carried supplies to the International Space Station, including food, water and oxygen for the crew and equipment for conducting scientific research. It also carried the radio transmitter for the RadioSkaf satellite, which was assembled aboard the ISS using a retired Orlan spacesuit.

== See also ==
- List of Progress flights
- Uncrewed spaceflights to the International Space Station
