= 2013 in spaceflight =

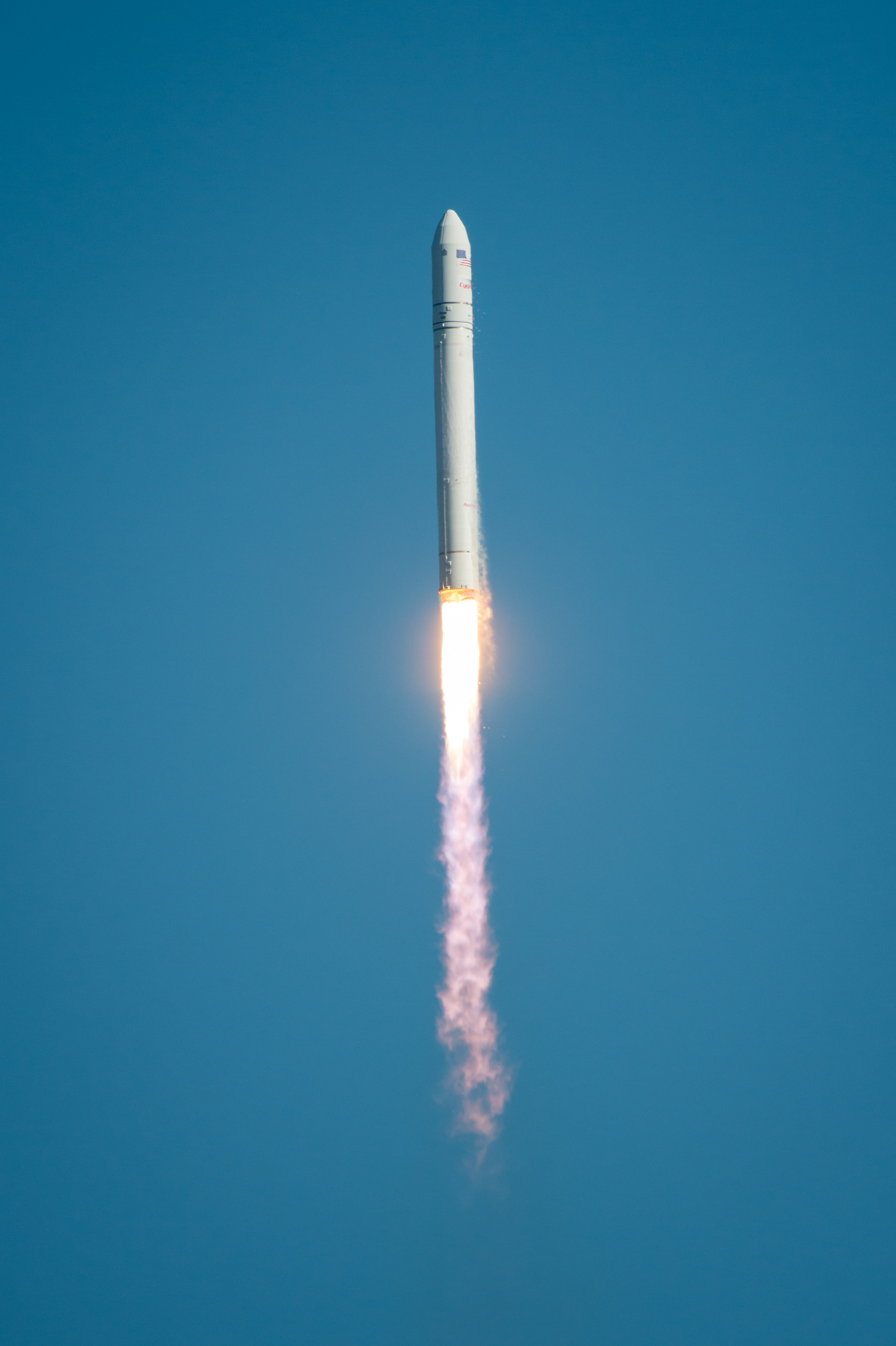
- The first launch of the Antares rocket occurred on 21 April 2013.

Orbital launches
- First: 15 January
- Last: 28 December
- Total: 81
- Successes: 77
- Failures: 3
- Partial failures: 1
- Catalogued: 78

National firsts
- Satellite: Azerbaijan; Austria; Ecuador; Estonia; Jersey; Qatar; Peru; Bolivia
- Orbital launch: South Korea (with assistance from Russia)

Rockets
- Maiden flights: Antares 110 (April); Minotaur V (September); Epsilon (September); Kuaizhou (September); Falcon 9 v1.1 (September); Soyuz-2-1v (December)
- Retirements: Naro-1 (January); Falcon 9 v1.0 (March); Antares 110 (April)

Crewed flights
- Orbital: 5
- Total travellers: 15
- EVAs: 11

2013 in spaceflight

In 2013, the maiden spaceflight of the Orbital Sciences' Antares launch vehicle, designated A-ONE, took place on 13 April. Orbital Science also launched its first spacecraft, Cygnus, that docked with the International Space Station in late September 2013.

A total of 81 orbital launches were attempted in 2013, of which 77 were successful, one was partially successful and three were failures. The year also saw eleven EVAs by ISS astronauts. The majority of the year's orbital launches were conducted by Russia, the United States and China, with 31, 19 and 15 launches respectively.

== Overview ==
India's Indian Space Research Organisation launched its first mission to Mars with the Mars Orbiter Mission that successfully reached Mars orbit on 23 September 2014.

Numerous significant milestones in robotic spaceflight occurred in 2013, including the landing of China's Chang'e 3 lander at Moon's Mare Imbrium on 14 December; it is China's first attempt and first successful soft landing by its spacecraft on an extraterrestrial surface.

Five crewed orbital launches were conducted during 2013, all successfully, carrying a total of 15 astronauts into orbit. Four of these missions were flown with the Russian Soyuz spacecraft and one with the Chinese Shenzhou.

== Orbital launches ==
- ← Jan
- Feb
- Mar
- Apr
- May
- Jun
- Jul
- Aug
- Sep
- Oct
- Nov
- Dec →

Date and time (UTC)	Rocket	Flight number	Launch site		LSP	
Date and time (UTC)	Payload (⚀ = CubeSat)	Operator	Orbit	Function	Decay (UTC)	Outcome
Date and time (UTC)	Remarks					
=== January ===
15 January; 16:24:59	(Russia) Rokot / Briz-KM		(Russia) Plesetsk Site 133/3		(Russia) VKO	
15 January; 16:24:59	(Russia) Kosmos 2482 (Strela-3M)	VKO	Low Earth	Communications	In orbit	Operational
15 January; 16:24:59	(Russia) Kosmos 2483 (Strela-3M)	VKO	Low Earth	Communications	In orbit	Launch Failure
15 January; 16:24:59	(Russia) Kosmos 2484 (Strela-3M)	VKO	Low Earth	Communications	In orbit	Operational
15 January; 16:24:59	Briz-KM failed around the time of spacecraft separation, resulting in the loss of one satellite.					
27 January; 04:40:00	(Japan) H-IIA 202		(Japan) Tanegashima LA-Y1		(Japan) Mitsubishi	
27 January; 04:40:00	(Japan) IGS Radar 4	CSIC	Low Earth (SSO)	Reconnaissance	In orbit	Operational
27 January; 04:40:00	(Japan) IGS Optical 5V	CSIC	Low Earth (SSO)	Technology demonstration	20 February 2019	Successful
30 January; 07:00:00	(Russia) (South Korea) Naro-1		(South Korea) Naro LC-1		(Russia) (South Korea) Khrunichev / KARI	
30 January; 07:00:00	(South Korea) STSAT-2C	KARI	Low Earth	Technology demonstration	13 November 2019	Successful
30 January; 07:00:00	First successful launch of Naro-1; first successful South Korean launch with Russian assistance; final flight of Naro-1.					
31 January; 01:48:00	(United States) Atlas V 401		(United States) Cape Canaveral SLC-41		(United States) United Launch Alliance	
31 January; 01:48:00	(United States) TDRS-K (TDRS-11)	NASA	Geosynchronous	Communications	In orbit	Operational
← Jan; Feb; Mar; Apr; May; Jun; Jul; Aug; Sep; Oct; Nov; Dec →; === February ===
1 February; 06:56:00	(Ukraine) Zenit-3SL		(Norway) Odyssey		(United Nations) Sea Launch	
1 February; 06:56:00	(United States) Intelsat 27	Intelsat	Intended: Geosynchronous	Communications	+40 seconds	Launch failure
1 February; 06:56:00	First stage failure, impacted ocean at 40 seconds after launch. Accident caused by failure of the first stage hydraulic power supply unit pump at T+3.9s, which lead to loss of engine gimbal control.					
6 February; 16:04:24	(Russia) Soyuz-2.1a / Fregat		(Kazakhstan) Baikonur Site 31/6		(France) (Russia) Starsem	
6 February; 16:04:24	(United States) Globalstar M078	Globalstar	Low Earth	Communications	In orbit	Operational
6 February; 16:04:24	(United States) Globalstar M093	Globalstar	Low Earth	Communications	In orbit	Operational
6 February; 16:04:24	(United States) Globalstar M094	Globalstar	Low Earth	Communications	In orbit	Operational
6 February; 16:04:24	(United States) Globalstar M095	Globalstar	Low Earth	Communications	In orbit	Operational
6 February; 16:04:24	(United States) Globalstar M096	Globalstar	Low Earth	Communications	In orbit	Operational
6 February; 16:04:24	(United States) Globalstar M097	Globalstar	Low Earth	Communications	In orbit	Operational
7 February; 21:36:07	(France) Ariane 5 ECA		(France) Kourou ELA-3		(France) Arianespace	
7 February; 21:36:07	(Azerbaijan) Azerspace-1/Africasat-1a	AMAKA	Geosynchronous	Communications	In orbit	Operational
7 February; 21:36:07	(Spain) Amazonas 3	Hispasat	Geosynchronous	Communications	In orbit	Operational
11 February; 14:41:46	(Russia) Soyuz-U		(Kazakhstan) Baikonur Site 1/5		(Russia) Roscosmos	
11 February; 14:41:46	(Russia) Progress M-18M / 50P	Roscosmos	Low Earth (ISS)	ISS logistics	26 July	Successful
11 February; 18:02:00	(United States) Atlas V 401		(United States) Vandenberg SLC-3E		(United States) United Launch Alliance	
11 February; 18:02:00	(United States) Landsat DCM	USGS	Low Earth (SSO)	Remote sensing	In orbit	Operational
25 February; 12:31	(India) PSLV-CA		(India) Satish Dhawan FLP		(India) ISRO	
25 February; 12:31	(India) (France) SARAL	ISRO / CNES	Low Earth (SSO)	Oceanography	In orbit	Operational
25 February; 12:31	(Canada) Sapphire	DND	Low Earth (SSO)	Space surveillance	In orbit	Operational
25 February; 12:31	(Canada) NEOSSat	CSA	Low Earth (SSO)	Asteroid detection	In orbit	Operational
25 February; 12:31	(Austria) UniBRITE-1	University of Vienna	Low Earth (SSO)	Optical astronomy	In orbit	Operational
25 February; 12:31	(Austria) TUGSAT-1	TU Graz	Low Earth (SSO)	Optical astronomy	In orbit	Operational
25 February; 12:31	⚀ (Denmark) AAUSAT3	Aalborg	Low Earth (SSO)	Technology demonstration	In orbit	Operational
25 February; 12:31	⚀ (United Kingdom) STRaND-1	SSTL	Low Earth (SSO)	Technology demonstration	In orbit	Operational
25 February; 12:31	TUGSAT-1 is the first Austrian satellite.					
← Jan; Feb; Mar; Apr; May; Jun; Jul; Aug; Sep; Oct; Nov; Dec →; === March ===
1 March; 15:10:13	(United States) Falcon 9 v1.0		(United States) Cape Canaveral SLC-40		(United States) SpaceX	
1 March; 15:10:13	(United States) SpaceX CRS-2	NASA	Low Earth (ISS)	ISS logistics	26 March; 16:34	Successful
1 March; 15:10:13	Final flight of Falcon 9 v1.0					
19 March; 21:21:00	(United States) Atlas V 401		(United States) Cape Canaveral SLC-41		(United States) United Launch Alliance	
19 March; 21:21:00	(United States) USA-241 (SBIRS-GEO 2)	US Air Force	Geosynchronous	Missile defense	In orbit	Operational
26 March; 19:06:48	(Russia) Proton-M / Briz-M		(Kazakhstan) Baikonur Site 200/39		(Russia) (United States) International Launch Services	
26 March; 19:06:48	(Mexico) Satmex 8	Satmex	Geosynchronous	Communications	In orbit	Operational
28 March; 20:43:20	(Russia) Soyuz-FG		(Kazakhstan) Baikonur Site 1/5		(Russia) Roscosmos	
28 March; 20:43:20	(Russia) Soyuz TMA-08M	Roscosmos	Low Earth (ISS)	Expedition 35/36	11 September; 02:58	Successful
28 March; 20:43:20	Crewed flight					
← Jan; Feb; Mar; Apr; May; Jun; Jul; Aug; Sep; Oct; Nov; Dec →; === April ===
15 April; 18:36:00	(Russia) Proton-M / Briz-M		(Kazakhstan) Baikonur Site 200/39		(Russia) (United States) International Launch Services	
15 April; 18:36:00	(Canada) Anik G1	Telesat	Geosynchronous	Communications	In orbit	Operational
19 April; 10:00:00	(Russia) Soyuz-2.1a		(Kazakhstan) Baikonur Site 31/6		(Russia) Roscosmos	
19 April; 10:00:00	(Russia) Bion-M No.1	Roscosmos	Low Earth	Biological science	19 May; 03:12	Successful
19 April; 10:00:00	(Russia) AIST No.2	SSAU	Low Earth	Technology demonstration	In orbit	Operational
19 April; 10:00:00	⚀ (United States) Dove 2	Cosmogia	Low Earth	Technology demonstration	In orbit	Operational
19 April; 10:00:00	⚀ (Germany) BeeSat 2	TU Berlin	Low Earth	Technology demonstration	In orbit	Operational
19 April; 10:00:00	⚀ (Germany) BeeSat 3	TU Berlin	Low Earth	Technology demonstration	In orbit	Operational
19 April; 10:00:00	⚀ (Germany) SOMP	TU Dresden	Low Earth	Technology demonstration	In orbit	Operational
19 April; 10:00:00	⚀ (South Korea) OSSI-1	OSSI	Low Earth	Amateur radio	8 July	Successful
21 April; 21:00:02	(United States) Antares 110		(United States) MARS LP-0A		(United States) Orbital Sciences	
21 April; 21:00:02	(United States) Cygnus Mass Simulator	NASA	Low Earth	Test flight	10 May	Successful
21 April; 21:00:02	⚀ (United States) Alexander (PhoneSat-2.0)	NASA	Low Earth	Technology demonstration	27 April	Successful
21 April; 21:00:02	⚀ (United States) Graham (PhoneSat-1.0)	NASA	Low Earth	Technology demonstration	27 April	Successful
21 April; 21:00:02	⚀ (United States) Bell (PhoneSat-1.0)	NASA	Low Earth	Technology demonstration	27 April	Successful
21 April; 21:00:02	⚀ (United States) Dove 1	Cosmogia	Low Earth	Technology demonstration	27 April	Successful
21 April; 21:00:02	Maiden flight of Antares, COTS risk reduction flight.					
24 April; 10:12:16	(Russia) Soyuz-U		(Kazakhstan) Baikonur Site 1/5		(Russia) Roscosmos	
24 April; 10:12:16	(Russia) Progress M-19M / 51P	Roscosmos	Low Earth (ISS)	ISS logistics	19 June	Successful
26 April; 04:13:04	(China) Long March 2D		(China) Jiuquan SLS-2		(China) SAST	
26 April; 04:13:04	(China) Gaofen 1	CNSA	Low Earth (SSO)	Earth observation	In orbit	Operational
26 April; 04:13:04	⚀ (Turkey) TurkSat-3USat	ITU	Low Earth (SSO)	Technology demonstration	In orbit	Operational
26 April; 04:13:04	⚀ (Ecuador) NEE-01 Pegaso	EXA	Low Earth (SSO)	Technology demonstration	In orbit	Operational
26 April; 04:13:04	⚀ (Argentina) CubeBug-1	INVAP	Low Earth (SSO)]	Technology demonstration	In orbit	Operational
26 April; 04:13:04	NEE-01 Pegaso is the first Ecuadorian satellite.					
26 April; 05:23:41	(Russia) Soyuz-2.1b / Fregat		(Russia) Plesetsk Site 43/4		(Russia) RVSN RF	
26 April; 05:23:41	(Russia) Kosmos 2485 (GLONASS-M 747)	VKO	Medium Earth	Navigation	In orbit	Operational
← Jan; Feb; Mar; Apr; May; Jun; Jul; Aug; Sep; Oct; Nov; Dec →; === May ===
1 May; 16:06:04	(China) Long March 3B/E		(China) Xichang LC-2		(China) CALT	
1 May; 16:06:04	(China) ChinaSat 11	China Satcom	Geosynchronous	Communications	In orbit	Operational
7 May; 02:06:31	(Italy) Vega		(France) Kourou ELV		(France) Arianespace	
7 May; 02:06:31	Proba-V	ESA	Low Earth (SSO)	Technology demonstration	In orbit	Operational
7 May; 02:06:31	(Vietnam) VNREDSat 1A	VAST	Low Earth (SSO)	Earth observation	In orbit	Operational
7 May; 02:06:31	⚀ (Estonia) ESTCube-1	Tartu	Low Earth (SSO)	Technology demonstration	In orbit	Operational
7 May; 02:06:31	ESTCube-1 is the first Estonian satellite.					
14 May; 16:02:00	(Russia) Proton-M / Briz-M		(Kazakhstan) Baikonur Site 200/39		(Russia) (United States) International Launch Services	
14 May; 16:02:00	(France) Eutelsat 3D	Eutelsat	Geosynchronous	Communications	In orbit	Operational
15 May; 21:38:00	(United States) Atlas V 401		(United States) Cape Canaveral SLC-41		(United States) United Launch Alliance	
15 May; 21:38:00	(United States) USA-242 (GPS IIF-4)	U.S. Air Force	Medium Earth	Navigation	In orbit	Operational
15 May; 21:38:00	Named after Star Vega.					
25 May; 00:27:00	(United States) Delta IV-M+ (5,4)		(United States) Cape Canaveral SLC-37B		(United States) United Launch Alliance	
25 May; 00:27:00	(United States) USA-243 (WGS-5)	U.S. Air Force	Geosynchronous	Communications	In orbit	Operational
28 May; 20:31:24	(Russia) Soyuz-FG		(Kazakhstan) Baikonur Site 1/5		(Russia) Roscosmos	
28 May; 20:31:24	(Russia) Soyuz TMA-09M	Roscosmos	Low Earth (ISS)	Expedition 36/37	11 November; 02:49	Successful
28 May; 20:31:24	Crewed flight					
← Jan; Feb; Mar; Apr; May; Jun; Jul; Aug; Sep; Oct; Nov; Dec →; === June ===
3 June; 09:18:31	(Russia) Proton-M / Briz-M		(Kazakhstan) Baikonur Site 200/39		(Russia) (United States) International Launch Services	
3 June; 09:18:31	(France) SES-6	SES S.A.	Geosynchronous	Communications	In orbit	Operational
5 June; 21:52:11	(France) Ariane 5 ES		(France) Kourou ELA-3		(France) Arianespace	
5 June; 21:52:11	Albert Einstein ATV	ESA	Low Earth (ISS)	ISS logistics	28 October	Successful
7 June; 18:37:59	(Russia) Soyuz-2.1b		(Russia) Plesetsk Site 43/4		(Russia) VKO	
7 June; 18:37:59	(Russia) Kosmos 2486 (Persona №2)	VKO	Low Earth (SSO)	Optical reconnaissance	In orbit	Operational
11 June; 09:38:02	(China) Long March 2F	Y10	(China) Jiuquan SLS-1		(China) CALT	
11 June; 09:38:02	(China) Shenzhou 10	CMSA	Low Earth (Tiangong-1)	Technology demonstration	26 June; 00:07	Successful
11 June; 09:38:02	China's fifth crewed spaceflight mission (2 men, 1 woman astronaut) to Tiangong-1 space lab.					
25 June; 17:28:48	(Russia) Soyuz-2.1b		(Kazakhstan) Baikonur Site 31/6		(Russia) Roscosmos	
25 June; 17:28:48	(Russia) Resurs-P No.1	Roscosmos	Low Earth (SSO)	Remote sensing	In orbit	Successful
25 June; 17:28:48	On 26 June 2024 the satellite was involved in a debris-generating event, with more than 100 debris identified as a result of the incident.					
25 June; 19:27:03	(Russia) Soyuz-STB / Fregat		(France) Kourou ELS		(France) Arianespace	
25 June; 19:27:03	(Jersey) O3b PFM	O3b Networks	Medium Earth	Communications	In orbit	Operational
25 June; 19:27:03	(Jersey) O3b FM2	O3b Networks	Medium Earth	Communications	In orbit	Operational
25 June; 19:27:03	(Jersey) O3b FM4	O3b Networks	Medium Earth	Communications	In orbit	Operational
25 June; 19:27:03	(Jersey) O3b FM5	O3b Networks	Medium Earth	Communications	In orbit	Operational
27 June; 16:53:00	(Russia) Strela		(Kazakhstan) Baikonur Site 175/59		(Russia) Roscosmos	
27 June; 16:53:00	(Russia) Kosmos 2487 (Kondor No.202)	Roscosmos	Low Earth	Radar imaging	29 November 2022	Successful
28 June; 02:27:46	(United States) Pegasus-XL		(United States) Stargazer, Vandenberg		(United States) Orbital Sciences	
28 June; 02:27:46	(United States) IRIS	NASA	Low Earth (SSO)	Heliophysics	In orbit	Operational
← Jan; Feb; Mar; Apr; May; Jun; Jul; Aug; Sep; Oct; Nov; Dec →; === July ===
1 July; 18:11	(India) PSLV-XL		(India) Satish Dhawan FLP		(India) ISRO	
1 July; 18:11	(India) IRNSS-1A	ISRO	Geosynchronous	Navigation	In orbit	Operational
2 July; 02:38:22	(Russia) Proton-M / DM-03 Enhanced		(Kazakhstan) Baikonur Site 81/24		(Russia) RVSN RF	
2 July; 02:38:22	(Russia) GLONASS-M 748	VKO	Intended: Medium Earth	Navigation	2 July	Launch failure
2 July; 02:38:22	(Russia) GLONASS-M 749	VKO	Intended: Medium Earth	Navigation	2 July	Launch failure
2 July; 02:38:22	(Russia) GLONASS-M 750	VKO	Intended: Medium Earth	Navigation	2 July	Launch failure
2 July; 02:38:22	First stage guidance failure due to angular velocity sensors installed upside down, rocket crashed near launch pad.					
15 July; 09:27:03	(China) Long March 2C		(China) Jiuquan SLS-2		(China) CALT	
15 July; 09:27:03	(China) Shijian 11-05	CNSA	Low Earth (SSO)	Technology demonstration	In orbit	Operational
19 July; 13:00:00	(United States) Atlas V 551		(United States) Cape Canaveral SLC-41		(United States) United Launch Alliance	
19 July; 13:00:00	(United States) MUOS-2	U.S. Navy	Geosynchronous	Communications	In orbit	Operational
19 July; 23:37:55	(China) Long March 4C		(China) Taiyuan LC-9		(China) SAST	
19 July; 23:37:55	(China) Shijian 15	CNSA	Low Earth (SSO)	Technology demonstration	In orbit	Operational
19 July; 23:37:55	(China) Shiyan 7	CNSA	Low Earth (SSO)	Technology demonstration	In orbit	Operational
19 July; 23:37:55	(China) Chuang Xin 3	CNSA	Low Earth (SSO)	Technology demonstration	In orbit	Operational
25 July; 19:54:07	(France) Ariane 5 ECA		(France) Kourou ELA-3		(France) Arianespace	
25 July; 19:54:07	(United Kingdom) Alphasat I-XL (Inmarsat-XL)	ESA / Inmarsat	Geosynchronous	Technology demonstration / Communications	In orbit	Operational
25 July; 19:54:07	(India) INSAT-3D	ISRO	Geosynchronous	Meteorology	In orbit	Operational
25 July; 19:54:07	First Alphabus satellite.					
27 July; 20:45:08	(Russia) Soyuz-U		(Kazakhstan) Baikonur Site 31/6		(Russia) Roscosmos	
27 July; 20:45:08	(Russia) Progress M-20M / 52P	Roscosmos	Low Earth (ISS)	ISS logistics	11 February 2014	Successful
← Jan; Feb; Mar; Apr; May; Jun; Jul; Aug; Sep; Oct; Nov; Dec →; === August ===
3 August; 19:48:46	(Japan) H-IIB		(Japan) Tanegashima LA-Y2		(Japan) MHI	
3 August; 19:48:46	(Japan) Kounotori 4	JAXA	Low Earth (ISS)	ISS logistics	7 September	Successful
3 August; 19:48:46	⚀ (United States) TechEdSat-3p	NASA Ames	Low Earth	Technology demonstration	16 January 2014	Successful
3 August; 19:48:46	⚀ (Vietnam) PicoDragon	VNSC	Low Earth	Technology demonstration	28 February 2014	Successful
3 August; 19:48:46	⚀ (United States) ArduSat-1	NanoSatisfi	Low Earth	Technology demonstration	16 April 2014	Successful
3 August; 19:48:46	⚀ (United States) ArduSat-X	NanoSatisfi	Low Earth	Technology demonstration	15 April 2014	Successful
8 August; 00:29:00	(United States) Delta IV-M+ (5,4)		(United States) Cape Canaveral SLC-37B		(United States) United Launch Alliance	
8 August; 00:29:00	(United States) USA-244 (WGS-6)	U.S. Air Force	Geosynchronous	Communications	In orbit	Operational
22 August; 14:39:13	(Ukraine) Dnepr		(Russia) Dombarovsky Site 13		(Russia) ISC Kosmotras	
22 August; 14:39:13	(South Korea) KOMPSat-5 (Arirang-5)	KARI	Low Earth (SSO)	Remote sensing	In orbit	Operational
28 August; 18:03:00	(United States) Delta IV Heavy		(United States) Vandenberg SLC-6		(United States) United Launch Alliance	
28 August; 18:03:00	(United States) USA-245 (KH-11)	NRO	Low Earth (SSO)	Optical Imaging	In orbit	Operational
28 August; 18:03:00	NRO Launch 65; final KH-11 satellite.					
29 August; 20:30:07	(France) Ariane 5 ECA		(France) Kourou ELA-3		(France) Arianespace	
29 August; 20:30:07	(France) (Qatar) Eutelsat 25B/Es'hail 1	Eutelsat / Es'hailSat	Geosynchronous	Communications	In orbit	Operational
29 August; 20:30:07	(India) GSAT-7	ISRO	Geosynchronous	Communications	In orbit	Operational
31 August; 20:05:00	(Ukraine) (Russia) Zenit-3SLB		(Kazakhstan) Baikonur Site 45/1		(Russia) SIS	
31 August; 20:05:00	(Israel) Amos-4	SCL	Geosynchronous	Communications	In orbit	Operational
← Jan; Feb; Mar; Apr; May; Jun; Jul; Aug; Sep; Oct; Nov; Dec →; === September ===
1 September; 19:16	(China) Long March 4C		(China) Jiuquan SLS-2		(China) SAST	
1 September; 19:16	(China) Yaogan 17A	CNSA	Low Earth	ELINT	In orbit	Operational
1 September; 19:16	(China) Yaogan 17B	CNSA	Low Earth	ELINT	In orbit	Operational
1 September; 19:16	(China) Yaogan 17C	CNSA	Low Earth	ELINT	In orbit	Operational
7 September; 03:27:00	(United States) Minotaur V		(United States) MARS LP-0B		(United States) Orbital Sciences	
7 September; 03:27:00	(United States) LADEE	NASA	Selenocentric	Lunar orbiter	18 April 2014; 04:30	Successful
7 September; 03:27:00	Maiden flight of Minotaur V, first Lunar launch from MARS.					
11 September; 23:23:04	(Russia) Rokot / Briz-KM		(Russia) Plesetsk Site 133/3		(Russia) VKO	
11 September; 23:23:04	(Russia) Gonets-M 5	Gonets Satellite System	Low Earth	Communications	In orbit	Operational
11 September; 23:23:04	(Russia) Gonets-M 6	Gonets Satellite System	Low Earth	Communications	In orbit	Operational
11 September; 23:23:04	(Russia) Gonets-M 7	Gonets Satellite System	Low Earth	Communications	In orbit	Operational
14 September; 05:00:00	(Japan) Epsilon	Epsilon-1	(Japan) Uchinoura		(Japan) JAXA	
14 September; 05:00:00	(Japan) Hisaki (SPRINT-A)	JAXA	Low Earth	Ultraviolet astronomy	In orbit	Successful
14 September; 05:00:00	Maiden flight of the Epsilon rocket.					
18 September; 08:10:00	(United States) Atlas V 531		(United States) Cape Canaveral SLC-41		(United States) United Launch Alliance	
18 September; 08:10:00	(United States) USA-246 (AEHF-3)	U.S. Air Force	Geosynchronous	Communications	In orbit	Operational
18 September; 14:58:02	(United States) Antares 110		(United States) MARS LP-0A		(United States) Orbital Sciences	
18 September; 14:58:02	(United States) Cygnus 1 S.S. G. David Low	NASA	Low Earth (ISS)	ISS logistics / Test flight	23 October; 18:16	Successful
18 September; 14:58:02	Maiden flight of Cygnus; COTS demonstration flight; final flight of Antares 110.					
23 September; 03:07:11	(China) Long March 4C		(China) Taiyuan LC-9		(China) SAST	
23 September; 03:07:11	(China) Fengyun 3C	CMA	Low Earth (SSO)	Meteorology	In orbit	Operational
25 September; 04:37	(China) Kuaizhou		(China) Jiuquan LS-95A		(China) CASIC	
25 September; 04:37	(China) Kuaizhou-1	CAS	Low Earth (SSO)	Optical imaging	1 September 2015	Successful
25 September; 04:37	Maiden flight of Kuaizhou.					
25 September; 20:58:50	(Russia) Soyuz-FG		(Kazakhstan) Baikonur Site 1/5		(Russia) Roscosmos	
25 September; 20:58:50	(Russia) Soyuz TMA-10M	Roscosmos	Low Earth (ISS)	Expedition 37/38	11 March 2014; 03:24	Successful
25 September; 20:58:50	Crewed flight					
29 September; 16:00:00	(United States) Falcon 9 v1.1		(United States) Vandenberg SLC-4E		(United States) SpaceX	
29 September; 16:00:00	(Canada) CASSIOPE	MDA Corporation	Low Earth	Communications/science	In orbit	Operational
29 September; 16:00:00	(United States) CUSat	Cornell	Low Earth	Technology demonstration	In orbit	Operational
29 September; 16:00:00	(United States) DANDE	CU-Boulder	Low Earth	Technology demonstration	In orbit	Operational
29 September; 16:00:00	⚀ (United States) POPACS-1	Drexel	Low Earth	Atmospheric research	In orbit	Operational
29 September; 16:00:00	⚀ (United States) POPACS-2	Drexel	Low Earth	Atmospheric research	In orbit	Operational
29 September; 16:00:00	⚀ (United States) POPACS-3	Drexel	Low Earth	Atmospheric research	In orbit	Operational
29 September; 16:00:00	Maiden flight of Falcon 9 v1.1.					
29 September; 21:38:10	(Russia) Proton-M / Briz-M		(Kazakhstan) Baikonur Site 200/39		(Russia) (United States) International Launch Services	
29 September; 21:38:10	(Luxembourg) Astra 2E	SES S.A.	Geosynchronous	Communications	In orbit	Operational
← Jan; Feb; Mar; Apr; May; Jun; Jul; Aug; Sep; Oct; Nov; Dec →; === October ===
25 October; 03:50:03	(China) Long March 4B		(China) Jiuquan SLS-2		(China) SAST	
25 October; 03:50:03	(China) Shijian 16-01	CNSA	Low Earth	Technology demonstration	In orbit	Operational
25 October; 18:08:54	(Russia) Proton-M / Briz-M		(Kazakhstan) Baikonur Site 200/39		(Russia) (United States) International Launch Services	
25 October; 18:08:54	(United States) Sirius FM-6	Sirius Satellite Radio	Geosynchronous	Communications	In orbit	Operational
29 October; 02:50:04	(China) Long March 2C		(China) Taiyuan LC-9		(China) CALT	
29 October; 02:50:04	(China) Yaogan 18	CNSA	Low Earth (SSO)	Reconnaissance	7 April 2021; 00:35	Successful
← Jan; Feb; Mar; Apr; May; Jun; Jul; Aug; Sep; Oct; Nov; Dec →; === November ===
5 November; 09:08	(India) PSLV-XL		(India) Satish Dhawan FLP		(India) ISRO	
5 November; 09:08	(India) Mars Orbiter Mission (Mangalyaan)	ISRO	Areocentric	Mars orbiter	In orbit	Successful
5 November; 09:08	India's first interplanetary mission. Last contact with orbiter in April 2022.					
7 November; 04:14:15	(Russia) Soyuz-FG		(Kazakhstan) Baikonur Site 1/5		(Russia) Roscosmos	
7 November; 04:14:15	(Russia) Soyuz TMA-11M	Roscosmos	Low Earth (ISS)	Expedition 38/39	14 May 2014; 01:58	Successful
7 November; 04:14:15	Crewed flight					
11 November; 23:46:00	(Russia) Proton-M / Briz-M		(Kazakhstan) Baikonur Site 81/24		(Russia) RVSN RF	
11 November; 23:46:00	(Russia) Raduga-1M 3	VKO	Geosynchronous	Communications	In orbit	Operational
18 November; 18:28:00	(United States) Atlas V 401		(United States) Cape Canaveral SLC-41		(United States) United Launch Alliance	
18 November; 18:28:00	(United States) MAVEN	NASA	Areocentric	Mars orbiter	In orbit	Successful
18 November; 18:28:00	NASA space probe to study the Martian atmosphere. Last contact with orbiter in December 2025.					
20 November; 01:15:00	(United States) Minotaur I		(United States) MARS LP-0B		(United States) Orbital Sciences	
20 November; 01:15:00	(United States) ORS-3	ORS	Low Earth	Technology demonstration	25 December 2015	Successful
20 November; 01:15:00	(United States) STPSat 3	USAF STP	Low Earth	Technology demonstration	11 March 2023	Successful
20 November; 01:15:00	⚀ (United States) ORSES	ORS	Low Earth	Technology demonstration	3 January 2016	Successful
20 November; 01:15:00	⚀ (United States) ORS Tech 1	ORS	Low Earth	Technology demonstration	23 March 2015	Successful
20 November; 01:15:00	⚀ (United States) ORS Tech 2	ORS	Low Earth	Technology demonstration	3 April 2015	Successful
20 November; 01:15:00	⚀ (United States) Prometheus 1A	SOCOM	Low Earth	Technology demonstration	12 December 2015	Successful
20 November; 01:15:00	⚀ (United States) Prometheus 1B	SOCOM	Low Earth	Technology demonstration	10 December 2015	Successful
20 November; 01:15:00	⚀ (United States) Prometheus 2A	SOCOM	Low Earth	Technology demonstration	8 December 2015	Successful
20 November; 01:15:00	⚀ (United States) Prometheus 2B	SOCOM	Low Earth	Technology demonstration	13 December 2015	Successful
20 November; 01:15:00	⚀ (United States) Prometheus 3A	SOCOM	Low Earth	Technology demonstration	29 November 2015	Successful
20 November; 01:15:00	⚀ (United States) Prometheus 3B	SOCOM	Low Earth	Technology demonstration	10 December 2015	Successful
20 November; 01:15:00	⚀ (United States) Prometheus 4A	SOCOM	Low Earth	Technology demonstration	5 December 2015	Successful
20 November; 01:15:00	⚀ (United States) Prometheus 4B	SOCOM	Low Earth	Technology demonstration	1 December 2015	Successful
20 November; 01:15:00	⚀ (United States) SENSE-1	USAF SMC	Low Earth	Technology demonstration	21 March 2015	Successful
20 November; 01:15:00	⚀ (United States) SENSE-2	USAF SMC	Low Earth	Technology demonstration	28 October 2019	Successful
20 November; 01:15:00	⚀ (United States) Firefly	NASA / NRO	Low Earth	Atmospheric science	1 November 2017	Successful
20 November; 01:15:00	⚀ (United States) Horus (STARE-B)	LLNL	Low Earth	Technology demonstration	26 April 2018	Successful
20 November; 01:15:00	⚀ (United States) Black Knight	West Point	Low Earth	Technology demonstration	16 July 2015	Successful
20 November; 01:15:00	⚀ (United States) NPS-SCAT	NPS	Low Earth	Technology demonstration	28 October 2015	Successful
20 November; 01:15:00	⚀ (United States) DragonSat-1	Drexel	Low Earth	Technology demonstration	31 August 2016	Successful
20 November; 01:15:00	⚀ (United States) COPPER	St. Louis	Low Earth	Technology demonstration	4 February 2016	Successful
20 November; 01:15:00	⚀ (United States) ChargerSat-1	UAH	Low Earth	Technology demonstration	19 March 2016	Successful
20 November; 01:15:00	⚀ (United States) TJ^{3}Sat	TJHSST	Low Earth	Technology demonstration	17 September 2015	Successful
20 November; 01:15:00	⚀ (United States) Trailblazer 1	UNM	Low Earth	Technology demonstration	22 May 2016	Successful
20 November; 01:15:00	⚀ (United States) Vermont Lunar CubeSat	Vermont	Low Earth	Technology demonstration	21 November 2015	Successful
20 November; 01:15:00	⚀ (United States) SwampSat	UFL	Low Earth	Technology demonstration	13 December 2015	Successful
20 November; 01:15:00	⚀ (United States) CAPE-2	ULL	Low Earth	Technology demonstration	23 October 2014	Successful
20 November; 01:15:00	⚀ (United States) Ho'oponopono 2	UH	Low Earth	Technology demonstration	26 August 2021	Successful
20 November; 01:15:00	⚀ (United States) KySat-2	Kentucky/Morehead	Low Earth	Technology demonstration	12 February 2015	Successful
20 November; 01:15:00	⚀ (United States) PhoneSat-2.4	NASA Ames	Low Earth	Technology demonstration	31 January 2017	Successful
20 November; 01:15:00	Largest number of satellites launched on a single rocket (31). ORS-3 will remain attached to upper stage.					
20 November; 03:31:04	(China) Long March 4C		(China) Taiyuan LC-9		(China) SAST	
20 November; 03:31:04	(China) Yaogan 19	CNSA	Low Earth	Reconnaissance	In orbit	Operational
21 November; 07:10:16	(Ukraine) Dnepr		(Russia) Dombarovsky Site 370/13		(Russia) ISC Kosmotras	
21 November; 07:10:16	(United Arab Emirates) DubaiSat-2	EIAST	Low Earth (SSO)	Technology demonstration	In orbit	Operational
21 November; 07:10:16	(South Korea) STSAT-3	KARI	Low Earth (SSO)	Technology demonstration	In orbit	Operational
21 November; 07:10:16	(United States) SkySat-1	Skybox Imaging	Low Earth (SSO)	Earth observation	In orbit	Operational
21 November; 07:10:16	⚀ (Japan) WNISAT-1	Weather News Inc.	Low Earth (SSO)	Meteorology	In orbit	Operational
21 November; 07:10:16	⚀ (Poland) Lem (BRITE-PL)	PAS	Low Earth (SSO)	Photometric astrometry	In orbit	Operational
21 November; 07:10:16	(United States) AprizeSat-7	AprizeSat	Low Earth (SSO)	Communications	In orbit	Operational
21 November; 07:10:16	(United States) AprizeSat-8	AprizeSat	Low Earth (SSO)	Communications	In orbit	Operational
21 November; 07:10:16	(Italy) UniSat-5	La Sapienza	Low Earth (SSO)	Technology demonstration, CubeSat deployment	In orbit	Operational
21 November; 07:10:16	⚀ (Netherlands) Delfi-n3Xt	TU-Delft	Low Earth (SSO)	Technology demonstration	In orbit	Operational
21 November; 07:10:16	⚀ (United States) Dove 3	Planet Labs	Low Earth (SSO)	Technology demonstration	In orbit	Operational
21 November; 07:10:16	⚀ (United States) Dove 4	Planet Labs	Low Earth (SSO)	Technology demonstration	In orbit	Operational
21 November; 07:10:16	⚀ (Netherlands) Triton 1	ISIS-BV	Low Earth (SSO)	Technology demonstration	In orbit	Operational
21 November; 07:10:16	⚀ (South Korea) KHUSat-1 (CINEMA-2)	KHU	Low Earth (SSO)	Space weather	In orbit	Operational
21 November; 07:10:16	⚀ (South Korea) KHUSat-2 (CINEMA-3)	KHU	Low Earth (SSO)	Space weather	In orbit	Operational
21 November; 07:10:16	⚀ (Argentina) CubeBug-2	INVAP	Low Earth (SSO)	Technology demonstration	In orbit	Operational
21 November; 07:10:16	⚀ (Denmark) GOMX-1	GOMSpace	Low Earth (SSO)	Technology demonstration	In orbit	Operational
21 November; 07:10:16	⚀ (Ecuador) NEE-02 Krysaor	EXA	Low Earth (SSO)	Technology demonstration	In orbit	Operational
21 November; 07:10:16	⚀ (United Kingdom) (Netherlands) FUNCube-1	AMSAT-UK/NL	Low Earth (SSO)	Technology demonstration	In orbit	Operational
21 November; 07:10:16	⚀ (Norway) HiNCube	Narvik	Low Earth (SSO)	Technology demonstration	In orbit	Operational
21 November; 07:10:16	⚀ (South Africa) ZACUBE-1	CPUT	Low Earth (SSO)	Technology demonstration	In orbit	Operational
21 November; 07:10:16	⚀ (Pakistan) ICube-1	PIST	Low Earth (SSO)	Technology demonstration	In orbit	Operational
21 November; 07:10:16	⚀ (Spain) HumSat-D	Vigo	Low Earth (SSO)	Technology demonstration	In orbit	Operational
21 November; 07:10:16	⚀ (Peru) PUCPSat-1	PUCP	Low Earth (SSO)	Technology demonstration	In orbit	Operational
21 November; 07:10:16	(Peru) Pocket-PUCP	PUCP	Low Earth (SSO)	Technology demonstration	In orbit	Operational
21 November; 07:10:16	⚀ (Germany) UWE-3	Würzburg	Low Earth (SSO)	Technology demonstration	In orbit	Operational
21 November; 07:10:16	▫ (United States) BeakerSat-1	Morehead	Low Earth (SSO)	Technology demonstration	13 February 2019	Successful
21 November; 07:10:16	▫ (United States) QubeScout-1	UMBC	Low Earth (SSO)	Technology demonstration	In orbit	Operational
21 November; 07:10:16	▫ (Germany) WREN	STADOKO UG	Low Earth (SSO)	Technology demonstration	In orbit	Operational
21 November; 07:10:16	▫ (United States) $50SAT	Morehead	Low Earth (SSO)	Technology demonstration	19 May 2018	Successful
21 November; 07:10:16	⚀ (Germany) First-MOVE	TU-Munich	Low Earth (SSO)	Technology demonstration	In orbit	Operational
21 November; 07:10:16	⚀ (Singapore) Velox-P2	NTU	Low Earth (SSO)	Technology demonstration	In orbit	Operational
21 November; 07:10:16	⚀ (Spain) OPTOS	INTA	Low Earth (SSO)	Technology demonstration	In orbit	Operational
21 November; 07:10:16	(Ukraine) BPA-3	Hartron-Arkos	Low Earth (SSO)	Technology demonstration	In orbit	Operational
21 November; 07:10:16	Largest number of satellites launched on a single rocket (32).					
22 November; 12:02:29	(Russia) Rokot / Briz-KM		(Russia) Plesetsk Site 133/3		(France) (Russia) Eurockot	
22 November; 12:02:29	Swarm A	ESA	Low Earth	Magnetospheric	In orbit	Operational
22 November; 12:02:29	Swarm B	ESA	Low Earth	Magnetospheric	In orbit	Operational
22 November; 12:02:29	Swarm C	ESA	Low Earth	Magnetospheric	In orbit	Operational
25 November; 02:12:04	(China) Long March 2D		(China) Jiuquan SLS-2		(China) SAST	
25 November; 02:12:04	(China) Shiyan 5	CNSA	Low Earth (SSO)	Technology demonstration	In orbit	Operational
25 November; 20:53:06	(Russia) Soyuz-U		(Kazakhstan) Baikonur Site 31/6		(Russia) Roscosmos	
25 November; 20:53:06	(Russia) Progress M-21M / 53P	Roscosmos	Low Earth (ISS)	ISS logistics	9 June 2014	Successful
← Jan; Feb; Mar; Apr; May; Jun; Jul; Aug; Sep; Oct; Nov; Dec →; === December ===
1 December; 17:30:00	(China) Long March 3B		(China) Xichang LC-2		(China) CALT	
1 December; 17:30:00	(China) Chang'e 3	CNSA	Selenocentric	Lunar lander	14 December; 13:12	Operational
1 December; 17:30:00	(China) Yutu	CNSA	Selenocentric	Lunar rover	14 December; 13:12	Operational
1 December; 17:30:00	China's first lunar rover, and the first spacecraft to make a soft landing on the Moon since the Soviet Luna 24 mission in 1976.					
3 December; 22:41:00	(United States) Falcon 9 v1.1		(United States) Cape Canaveral SLC-40		(United States) SpaceX	
3 December; 22:41:00	(Luxembourg) SES-8	SES World Skies	Geosynchronous	Communications	In orbit	Operational
3 December; 22:41:00	First launch of Falcon 9 v1.1 from CCAFS; first SpaceX launch targeting GEO.					
6 December; 07:14:30	(United States) Atlas V 501		(United States) Vandenberg SLC-3E		(United States) United Launch Alliance	
6 December; 07:14:30	(United States) USA-247 (Topaz)	NRO	Low Earth	Reconnaissance	In orbit	Operational
6 December; 07:14:30	⚀ (United States) AeroCube-5A	The Aerospace Corporation	Low Earth	Technology demonstration	19 April 2023	Successful
6 December; 07:14:30	⚀ (United States) AeroCube-5B	The Aerospace Corporation	Low Earth	Technology demonstration	23 November 2022	Successful
6 December; 07:14:30	⚀ (United States) ALICE	AFIT	Low Earth	Technology demonstration	In orbit	Operational
6 December; 07:14:30	⚀ (United States) CUNYSAT 1	CUNY	Low Earth	Technology demonstration	In orbit	Operational
6 December; 07:14:30	⚀ (United States) FIREBIRD A	Montana State	Low Earth	Technology demonstration	In orbit	Operational
6 December; 07:14:30	⚀ (United States) FIREBIRD B	Montana State	Low Earth	Technology demonstration	In orbit	Operational
6 December; 07:14:30	⚀ (United States) IPEX	NASA JPL	Low Earth	Technology demonstration	In orbit	Operational
6 December; 07:14:30	⚀ (United States) M-Cubed 2	Michigan	Low Earth	Technology demonstration	In orbit	Operational
6 December; 07:14:30	⚀ (United States) SMDC-ONE 2.3	U.S. Army	Low Earth	Technology demonstration	In orbit	Operational
6 December; 07:14:30	⚀ (United States) SMDC-ONE 2.4	U.S. Army	Low Earth	Technology demonstration	In orbit	Operational
6 December; 07:14:30	⚀ (United States) SNaP	U.S. Army	Low Earth	Technology demonstration	In orbit	Operational
6 December; 07:14:30	⚀ (United States) TacSat-6	ORS	Low Earth	Technology demonstration	In orbit	Operational
6 December; 07:14:30	NROL-39 mission.					
8 December; 12:12:00	(Russia) Proton-M / Briz-M		(Kazakhstan) Baikonur Site 200/39		(Russia) (United States) International Launch Services	
8 December; 12:12:00	(United Kingdom) Inmarsat 5-F1	Inmarsat	Geosynchronous	Communications	In orbit	Operational
9 December; 03:26	(China) Long March 4B		(China) Taiyuan LC-9		(China) SAST	
9 December; 03:26	(China) (Brazil) CBERS-3	CASC/INPE	Intended: Low Earth (SSO)	Remote sensing	9 December	Launch failure
9 December; 03:26	Third stage shutdown 11 seconds too early.					
19 December; 09:12:19	(Russia) Soyuz ST-B / Fregat-MT		(France) Kourou ELS		(France) Arianespace	
19 December; 09:12:19	Gaia	ESA	Sun–Earth L_{2}	Astrometric observatory	In orbit	Operational
20 December; 16:42:04	(China) Long March 3B/E		(China) Xichang LC-2		(China) CALT	
20 December; 16:42:04	(Bolivia) Túpac Katari 1	Agencia Boliviana Espacial	Geosynchronous	Communications	In orbit	Operational
25 December; 00:31:55	(Russia) Rokot / Briz-KM		(Russia) Plesetsk Site 133/3		(Russia) VKO	
25 December; 00:31:55	(Russia) Kosmos 2488 (Strela-3M 7)	VKO	Low Earth	Communications	In orbit	Operational
25 December; 00:31:55	(Russia) Kosmos 2489 (Strela-3M 8)	VKO	Low Earth	Communications	In orbit	Operational
25 December; 00:31:55	(Russia) Kosmos 2490 (Strela-3M 9)	VKO	Low Earth	Communications	In orbit	Operational
25 December; 00:31:55	(Russia) Kosmos 2491	VKO	Low Earth	Technology demonstration/Satellite inspection (?)	In orbit	Destroyed
25 December; 00:31:55	Kosmos 2491 broke up in orbit on 23 December 2019.					
26 December; 10:49:56	(Russia) Proton-M / Briz-M		(Kazakhstan) Baikonur Site 81/24		(Russia) Khrunichev	
26 December; 10:49:56	(Russia) Ekspress AM5	RSCC	Geosynchronous	Communications	In orbit	Operational
28 December; 12:30:00	(Russia) Soyuz-2-1v / Volga		(Russia) Plesetsk Site 43/4		(Russia) RVSN RF	
28 December; 12:30:00	(Russia) Aist 1	SSAU	Low Earth	Technology demonstration	In orbit	Operational
28 December; 12:30:00	(Russia) Kosmos 2492 (SKRL-756-1)	RVSN RF	Low Earth	Radar calibration	In orbit	Operational
28 December; 12:30:00	(Russia) Kosmos 2493 (SKRL-756-2)	RVSN RF	Low Earth	Radar calibration	In orbit	Operational
28 December; 12:30:00	Maiden flight of Soyuz-2-1v.					

- ← Jan
- Feb
- Mar
- Apr
- May
- Jun
- Jul
- Aug
- Sep
- Oct
- Nov
- Dec →

== Suborbital flights ==
Date and time (UTC)	Rocket	Flight number	Launch site		LSP	
Date and time (UTC)	Payload (⚀ = CubeSat)	Operator	Orbit	Function	Decay (UTC)	Outcome
Date and time (UTC)	Remarks					
26 January; 22:00	(United States) Ground Based Interceptor		(United States) Vandenberg LF-23		(United States) Missile Defense Agency	
26 January; 22:00	(United States) EKV	MDA	Suborbital	Anti-ballistic missile test	26 January	Successful
26 January; 22:00	Non-intercept flight test.					
27 January; ~12:10	(China) B-611		(China) Shuangchengzi		(China) PLA	
27 January; ~12:10		PLA	Suborbital	ABM target	11 January	Successful
27 January; ~12:10	Target					
27 January; ~12:10	(China) SC-19		(China) Korla		(China) PLA	
27 January; ~12:10		PLA	Suborbital	ABM test	11 January	Successful
27 January; ~12:10	Interceptor, successful intercept					
28 January	(Iran) Kavoshgar (Zelzal-based)		(Iran) Semnan		(Iran) ISA	
28 January	(Iran) Pishgam	ISA	Suborbital	Biological	28 January	Successful
28 January	Apogee: 116 kilometres (72 miles), carried a rhesus monkey					
29 January; 22:50	(United States) Terrier Improved Orion		(United States) Wallops Island		(United States) NASA	
29 January; 22:50	(United States) Lithium Release Experiments	NASA GSFC	Suborbital	Atmospheric experiments	29 January	Successful
29 January; 22:50	Apogee: ~130 kilometres (81 mi)					
7 February; 08:21	(United States) Talos Terrier Oriole Nihka		(United States) Poker Flat		(United States) NASA	
7 February; 08:21	(United States) VISIONS	NASA GSFC	Suborbital	Auroral research	7 February	Successful
13 February; 09:10	(United States) MRBTM	FTM-20	(United States) Kauai		(United States) MDA	
13 February; 09:10		MDA	Suborbital	ABM target	13 February	Successful
13 February; 09:10	SM-3 Block 1A target					
13 February; 09:15	(United States) RIM-161C SM-3 Block 1A	FTM-20	(United States) USS Lake Erie, Pacific Ocean		(United States) US Navy	
13 February; 09:15		US Navy	Suborbital	ABM test	13 February	Successful
13 February; 09:15	MRBTM interceptor, successful intercept					
15 February; 16:34	(United States) Terrier Improved Orion		(United States) White Sands		(United States) NASA	
15 February; 16:34	(United States) Technology Experiments	NASA GSFC/WFF	Suborbital	Technology demonstration	15 February	Successful
15 February; 16:34	Apogee: ~130 kilometres (81 mi) ?					
25 February; 05:52:31	(Israel) Arrow III		(Israel) Negev		(Israel) IAI	
25 February; 05:52:31		IAI/IDF	Suborbital	ABM Test	25 February	Successful
25 February; 05:52:31	Test flight of the Arrow-III					
11 March; 06:10	(United States) Terrier-Lynx		(United States) Wallops Island		(United States) DoD	
11 March; 06:10	(United States) Shark	DoD	Suborbital	Radar target	11 March	Successful
11 March; 06:10	Apogee: ~300 kilometres (190 mi)					
4 April; 21:55	(China) Tianying 3E		(China) Hainan		(China) CNSA	
4 April; 21:55	(China) Kunpeng-1	CSSAR	Suborbital	Environment monitoring	4 April	Successful
4 April; 21:55	Apogee: 191 kilometres (119 mi)					
7 April; 04:55	(India) Agni-II		(India) ITR IC-4		(India) Indian Army	
7 April; 04:55		Indian Army	Suborbital	Missile test	7 April	Successful
7 April; 04:55	Apogee: 200 kilometres (120 mi)					
10 April	(Pakistan) Shaheen-IA		(Pakistan) Sonmiani		(Pakistan) ASFC	
10 April		ASFC	Suborbital	Test flight	10 April	Successful
10 April	Apogee: 100 kilometres (62 mi)					
12 April; 04:25	(Brazil) VSB-30		(Sweden) Esrange		(Europe) EuroLaunch	
12 April; 04:25	(Germany) TEXUS-50	DLR/ESA	Suborbital	Microgravity	12 April	Successful
12 April; 04:25	Apogee: 261 kilometres (162 mi)					
21 April; 08:00	(Canada) Black Brant IX		(United States) White Sands		(United States) NASA	
21 April; 08:00	(United States) SLICE	CU Boulder	Suborbital	Astronomy	21 April	Successful
21 April; 08:00	Apogee: 318 kilometres (198 mi)?					
23 April; 17:30	(Canada) Black Brant IX		(United States) White Sands		(United States) NASA	
23 April; 17:30	(United States) EUNIS	NASA GSFC	Suborbital	Solar research	23 April	Successful
23 April; 17:30	Apogee: 320 kilometres (200 mi)?					
1 May; 07:38	(United States) Terrier Improved Orion		(United States) Roi-Namur		(United States) NASA	
1 May; 07:38	(United States) MOSC	NASA/Air Force Research Lab	Suborbital	Ionospheric research	1 May	Successful
1 May; 07:38	Apogee: ~189 kilometres (117 mi)					
5 May; 08:30	(France) M51		(France) Le Vigilant, Audierne Bay		(France) DGA/Marine nationale	
5 May; 08:30		DGA/Marine nationale	Suborbital	Test flight	5 May	Launch failure
7 May; 07:39:00	(United States) Terrier-Oriole		(United States) Roi-Namur		(United States) NASA	
7 May; 07:39:00	(United States) EVEX	University of Illinois	Suborbital	Atmospheric	7 May	Successful
7 May; 07:39:00	Apogee: ~350 kilometres (220 mi) ?					
7 May; 07:40:30	(United States) Terrier-Improved Malemute		(United States) Roi-Namur		(United States) NASA	
7 May; 07:40:30	(United States) EVEX	University of Illinois	Suborbital	Atmospheric	7 May	Successful
7 May; 07:40:30	Apogee: ~350 kilometres (220 mi) ?					
9 May; 07:23	(United States) Terrier Improved Orion		(United States) Roi-Namur		(United States) NASA	
9 May; 07:23	(United States) MOSC	NASA/Air Force Research Lab	Suborbital	Ionospheric research	9 May	Successful
9 May; 07:23	Apogee: ~189 kilometres (117 mi)					
11 May; 05:00	(Canada) Black Brant IX		(United States) White Sands		(United States) NASA	
11 May; 05:00	(United States) FORTIS	JHU	Suborbital	Astronomy	11 May	Successful
11 May; 05:00	Apogee: 280 kilometres (170 mi)?					
13 May; 12:58	(China) DF-21		(China) Xichang		(China)	
13 May; 12:58	(China) Kunpeng-7	CNSA	Suborbital	Magnetospheric research	13 May	Successful
13 May; 12:58	Apogee: 10,000 kilometres (6,200 mi)					
16 May; 03:25	(United States) ARAV-C	FTM-19	(United States) Kauai		(United States) MDA	
16 May; 03:25		MDA	Suborbital	ABM target	16 May	Successful
16 May; 03:25	SM-3 Block 1B target					
16 May; 03:30	(United States) RIM-161C SM-3 Block 1B	FTM-19	(United States) USS Lake Erie, Pacific Ocean		(United States) US Navy	
16 May; 03:30		US Navy	Suborbital	ABM test	16 May	Successful
16 May; 03:30	ARAV-C interceptor, successful intercept					
22 May; 13:27	(United States) LGM-30G Minuteman III		(United States) Vandenberg LF-04		(United States) U.S. Air Force	
22 May; 13:27		U.S. Air Force	Suborbital	Test flight	22 May	Successful
22 May; 13:27	GT207GM, Apogee: ~1,300 kilometres (810 mi) ?					
5 June; 07:00	Taiwan Sounding Rocket	Sounding Rocket VIII	(Taiwan) Jiu Peng Air Base		(Taiwan) NSPO	
5 June; 07:00	(Taiwan) Reaction control system, recovery capsule	NSPO/NCU	Suborbital	Technology test	5 June	Successful
5 June; 07:00	Apogee: 279 kilometres (173 mi)					
6 June; 03:05	(Canada) Black Brant XII		(United States) Wallops Island		(United States) NASA	
6 June; 03:05	(United States) CIBER	Caltech	Suborbital	Astronomy	6 June	Successful
6 June; 03:05	Apogee: 577 kilometres (359 mi)					
6 June; 17:45	(Russia) RS-26 Rubezh		(Russia) Kapustin Yar		(Russia) RVSN	
6 June; 17:45		RVSN	Suborbital	Missile test	6 June	Successful
20 June; 09:30	(United States) Terrier-Improved Orion		(United States) Wallops Island		(United States) NASA	
20 June; 09:30	(United States) RockOn	CU Boulder	Suborbital	Student experiments	20 June	Successful
20 June; 09:30	Apogee: 118 kilometres (73 mi)					
21 June; 13:57	(United States) SpaceLoft XL		(United States) Spaceport America		(United States) UP Aerospace	
21 June; 13:57	(United States) FOP-1	NASA	Suborbital	Student experiments	21 June	Successful
21 June; 13:57	Mission SL-7, Apogee: 119 kilometres (74 mi), successfully recovered					
27 June; 23:52	(Brazil) VS-30		(Norway) Andøya		(Germany) DLR	
27 June; 23:52	(Germany) WADIS-1	DLR	Suborbital	Atmospheric	27 June	Successful
27 June; 23:52	Apogee: 115 kilometres (71 mi), 12 Super Loki meteorological rockets were also launched					
4 July; 14:31:00	(Canada) Black Brant VB		(United States) Wallops LA-2		(United States) NASA	
4 July; 14:31:00	(United States) Daytime Dynamo	NASA GSFC	Suborbital	Geospace	4 July	Successful
4 July; 14:31:00	Apogee: 135 kilometres (84 mi)					
4 July; 14:31:15	(United States) Terrier Improved Orion		(United States) Wallops LA-2		(United States) NASA	
4 July; 14:31:15	(United States) Daytime Dynamo	NASA GSFC	Suborbital	Geospace	4 July	Successful
4 July; 14:31:15	Apogee: 160 kilometres (99 mi)					
5 July; 18:29	(United States) UGM-96 Trident I C4 (LV-2)	FTG-07	(Marshall Islands) Meck		(United States) MDA	
5 July; 18:29		MDA	Suborbital	ABM target	5 July	Successful
5 July; 18:35	(United States) Ground Based Interceptor	FTG-07	(United States) Vandenberg LF-23		(United States) MDA	
5 July; 18:35		MDA	Suborbital	ABM test	5 July	Spacecraft failure
5 July; 18:35	UMG-96 Trident I interceptor, intercept failed, EKV likely failed to separate from booster					
12 July	(Israel) Jericho III		(Israel) Palmachim		(Israel) Israeli Air Force	
12 July		Israeli Air Force	Suborbital	Missile test	12 July	Successful
15 July; 05:53	(Brazil) VS-30		(Sweden) Esrange		(Europe) EuroLaunch	
15 July; 05:53	(Germany) MAPHEUS-4	DLR	Suborbital	Technology demonstration	15 July	Successful
15 July; 05:53	Apogee: 151 kilometres (94 mi)					
20 July; 14:00:00	(Japan) S-310		(Japan) Uchinoura		(Japan) JAXA	
20 July; 14:00:00		JAXA/KU/HU/KUT/TU/TPU/ TU/UT/NU/CU/GSFC	Suborbital	Ionospheric research	20 July	Successful
20 July; 14:00:00	Apogee: 139 kilometres (86 mi)					
20 July; 14:57:00	(Japan) S-520		(Japan) Uchinoura		(Japan) JAXA	
20 July; 14:57:00		JAXA/KU/HU/KUT/TU/TPU/ TU/UT/NU/CU/GSFC	Suborbital	Ionospheric research	20 July	Successful
20 July; 14:57:00	Apogee: 316 kilometres (196 mi)					
8 August; 18:10	(Canada) Black Brant IX		(United States) White Sands		(United States) NASA	
8 August; 18:10	(United States) VERIS	NRL	Suborbital	Solar research	8 August	Successful
8 August; 18:10	Apogee: 280 kilometres (170 mi)?					
12 August; 03:45	(India) Prithvi II		(India) Integrated Test Range Launch Complex 3		(India) DRDO	
12 August; 03:45		DRDO	Suborbital	Missile test	12 August	Successful
12 August; 03:45	Apogee: ~100 kilometres (62 mi)					
13 August; 10:00	(United States) Terrier-Improved Malemute		(United States) Wallops Island		(United States) NASA	
13 August; 10:00	(United States) RockSat-X	NASA	Suborbital	Student experiments	13 August	Successful
13 August; 10:00	Apogee: 151 kilometres (94 mi)?					
3 September; 06:16	(Israel) Silver Sparrow		F-15 Eagle, Israel		(Israel) IAF	
3 September; 06:16		Israeli Air Force	Suborbital	ABM target	3 September	Successful
3 September; 06:16	Arrow-3 tracking target, Apogee: ~150 kilometres (93 mi)					
6 September; 05:20	(Russia) RSM-56 Bulava		(Russia) K-550 Aleksandr Nevskiy, White Sea		(Russia) VMF	
6 September; 05:20		VMF	Suborbital	Missile test	6 September	Launch failure
6 September; 05:20	Second stage failure					
10 September	(United States) UGM-133 Trident II D5		(United States) USS Tennessee, ETR		(United States) U.S. Navy	
10 September		US Navy	Suborbital	Test flight	10 September	Successful
10 September	Follow-on Commander's Evaluation Test ?					
10 September	(United States) UGM-133 Trident II D5		(United States) USS Tennessee, ETR		(United States) U.S. Navy	
10 September		US Navy	Suborbital	Test flight	10 September	Successful
10 September	Follow-on Commander's Evaluation Test ?					
10 September	(United States) eMRBM		C-17 Globemaster III, Pacific Ocean		(United States) MDA	
10 September		MDA/IMDO	Suborbital	ABM target	10 September	Successful
10 September	Target for THAAD, successful intercept					
10 September	(United States) MRBM		(United States) Wake Island		(United States) MDA	
10 September		MDA/IMDO	Suborbital	ABM target	10 September	Successful
10 September	Target for SM-3, successful intercept					
10 September	(United States) SM-3 Block 1A	FTO-01	(United States) USS Decatur (DDG-73), Pacific Ocean		(United States) US Navy	
10 September		US Navy	Suborbital	ABM test	10 September	Successful
10 September	Intercepted target missile					
10 September	(United States) THAAD	FTO-01	(Marshall Islands) Meck Island		(United States) US Army	
10 September		US Army/MDA	Suborbital	ABM test	10 September	Successful
10 September	Intercepted target missile					
10 September	(United States) THAAD	FTO-01	(Marshall Islands) Meck Island		(United States) US Army	
10 September		US Army/MDA	Suborbital	ABM test	10 September	Successful
10 September	Back-up interceptor for SM-3					
12 September	(United States) UGM-133 Trident II D5		(United States) USS Tennessee, ETR		(United States) U.S. Navy	
12 September		US Navy	Suborbital	Test flight	12 September	Successful
12 September	Follow-on Commander's Evaluation Test ?					
12 September	(United States) UGM-133 Trident II D5		(United States) USS Tennessee, ETR		(United States) U.S. Navy	
12 September		US Navy	Suborbital	Test flight	12 September	Successful
12 September	Follow-on Commander's Evaluation Test ?					
15 September; 09:20	(India) Agni-V		(India) Integrated Test Range		(India) DRDO	
15 September; 09:20		DRDO	Suborbital	Test flight	15 September	Successful
15 September; 09:20	Apogee: 800 kilometres (500 mi), second flight of Agni-V					
18 September; 11:15	(Brazil) (United States) VS-30/Improved Orion		(Norway) Andøya		(Germany) DLR	
18 September; 11:15	(Australia) Scramspace	University of Queensland	Suborbital	Technology demonstration	18 September	Launch failure
18 September; 11:15	Hypersonic research experiment, first stage failure of launch vehicle					
19 September; 00:30	(United States) ARAV-C++	FTM-21	(United States) Kauai		(United States) MDA	
19 September; 00:30		MDA	Suborbital	ABM target	19 September	Successful
19 September; 00:30	SM-3 Block 1B target					
19 September; 00:32 ?	(United States) RIM-161C SM-3 Block 1B	FTM-21	(United States) USS Lake Erie, Pacific Ocean		(United States) US Navy	
19 September; 00:32 ?		US Navy	Suborbital	ABM test	19 September	Successful
19 September; 00:32 ?	ARAV-C++ interceptor, successful intercept					
19 September; 00:32 ?	(United States) RIM-161C SM-3 Block 1B	FTM-21	(United States) USS Lake Erie, Pacific Ocean		(United States) US Navy	
19 September; 00:32 ?		US Navy	Suborbital	ABM test	19 September	Successful
19 September; 00:32 ?	ARAV-C++ back-up interceptor					
22 September; 10:01	(United States) LGM-30G Minuteman III		(United States) Vandenberg LF-10		(United States) US Air Force	
22 September; 10:01		US Air Force	Suborbital	Test flight	22 September	Successful
22 September; 10:01	GT209GM, Apogee: ~1,300 kilometres (810 mi) ?					
26 September; 10:33	(United States) LGM-30G Minuteman III		(United States) Vandenberg LF-09		(United States) US Air Force	
26 September; 10:33		U.S. Air Force	Suborbital	Test flight	26 September	Successful
26 September; 10:33	GT208GM, Apogee: ~1,300 kilometres (810 mi) ?					
4 October; 05:33	(United States) ARAV-ER	FTM-22	(United States) Kauai		(United States) MDA	
4 October; 05:33		MDA	Suborbital	ABM target	4 October	Successful
4 October; 05:33	SM-3 Block 1B target					
4 October; 05:37 ?	(United States) RIM-161C SM-3 Block 1B	FTM-22	(United States) USS Lake Erie, Pacific Ocean		(United States) US Navy	
4 October; 05:37 ?		US Navy	Suborbital	ABM test	4 October	Successful
4 October; 05:37 ?	ARAV-ER interceptor, successful intercept					
7 October; 03:45	(India) Prithvi II		(India) Integrated Test Range Launch Complex 3		(India) DRDO	
7 October; 03:45		DRDO	Suborbital	Missile test	7 October	Successful
7 October; 03:45	Apogee: ~100 kilometres (62 mi)					
8 October; 06:50	(India) Prithvi II		(India) Integrated Test Range Launch Complex 3		(India) DRDO	
8 October; 06:50		DRDO	Suborbital	Missile test	8 October	Successful
8 October; 06:50	Apogee: ~100 kilometres (62 mi)					
10 October; 13:39	(Russia) RS-12M Topol		(Russia) Kapustin Yar		(Russia) RVSN	
10 October; 13:39		RVSN	Suborbital	Missile test	10 October	Successful
10 October; 13:39	Test of a new experimental reentry vehicle					
21 October; 10:00	(Canada) Black Brant IX		(United States) White Sands		(United States) NASA	
21 October; 10:00	(United States) EVE	CU Boulder	Suborbital	SDO calibration	21 October	Successful
21 October; 10:00	Apogee: 273 kilometres (170 mi)					
30 October	(Russia) RT-2PM Topol		(Russia) Plesetsk		(Russia) RVSN	
30 October		RVSN	Suborbital	Missile test	30 October	Successful
30 October	(Russia) R-36M2 Voyevoda		(Russia) Dombarovsky		(Russia) RVSN	
30 October		RVSN	Suborbital	Missile test	30 October	Successful
30 October	(Russia) R-29RMU Sineva		(Russia) K-117 Bryansk, Barents Sea		(Russia) VMF	
30 October		VMF	Suborbital	Missile test	30 October	Successful
30 October	(Russia) R-29R Volna		(Russia) K-433 Svyatoy Georgiy Pobedonosets, Sea of Okhotsk		(Russia) VMF	
30 October		VMF	Suborbital	Missile test	30 October	Successful
3 November; 09:25	(Canada) Black Brant IX		(United States) White Sands		(United States) NASA	
3 November; 09:25	X-ray Quantum Calorimeter	UW-Madison	Suborbital	X-ray astronomy	3 November	Successful
3 November; 09:25	Apogee: 278 kilometres (173 mi)					
8 November	(India) Agni-I		(India) Integrated Test Range		(India) IDRDL	
8 November		IDRDL	Suborbital	Missile test	8 November	Successful
8 November	Apogee: ~500 kilometres (310 mi)?					
12 November; 16:15	(United States) SpaceLoft XL		(United States) Spaceport America		(United States) UP Aerospace	
12 November; 16:15	(United States) FOP-2	NASA	Suborbital	Six technology experiments	12 November	Successful
12 November; 16:15	Mission SL-8, Apogee: 116 kilometres (72 mi), successfully recovered					
20 November; 11:40	(Canada) Black Brant IX		(United States) White Sands		(United States) NASA	
20 November; 11:40	(United States) FORTIS	JHU	Suborbital	UV astronomy	20 November	Successful
20 November; 11:40	Studied spectra of comet ISON, apogee: 277 kilometres (172 mi)					
27 November; 03:50	(Canada) Black Brant IX		(United States) White Sands		(United States) NASA	
27 November; 03:50	(United States) VeSpR	Boston University	Suborbital	UV astronomy	27 November	Successful
27 November; 03:50	Venus Spectral Rocket Experiment, apogee: 280 kilometres (170 mi)					
3 December	(India) Prithvi II		(India) Integrated Test Range Launch Complex 3		(India) DRDO	
3 December		DRDO	Suborbital	Missile test	3 December	Successful
3 December	Apogee: ~100 kilometres (62 mi)					
14 December	(Iran) Shahab-1		(Iran) Semnan		(Iran) ISA	
14 December	(Iran) Kavoshgar Pazhuhesh	ISA	Suborbital	Biological	14 December	Successful
14 December	Apogee: 120 kilometres (72 miles), carried a rhesus monkey					
17 December; 12:36	(United States) LGM-30G Minuteman III		(United States) Vandenberg LF-04		(United States) US Air Force	
17 December; 12:36		US Air Force	Suborbital	Test flight	17 December	Successful
17 December; 12:36	GT210GM, Apogee: ~1,300 kilometres (810 mi) ?					
23 December; 11:28	(India) Agni-III		(India) ITR IC-4		(India) Indian Army	
23 December; 11:28		Indian Army	Suborbital	Missile test	23 December	Successful
23 December; 11:28	Apogee: 350 kilometres (220 mi)					
24 December; 07:00	(Russia) RS-24 Yars		(Russia) Plesetsk		(Russia) RVSN	
24 December; 07:00		RVSN	Suborbital	Missile test	24 December	Successful
27 December; 17:30	(Russia) RS-12M Topol		(Russia) Kapustin Yar		(Russia) RVSN	
27 December; 17:30		RVSN	Suborbital	Missile test	27 December	Successful

== Deep space rendezvous ==
Date (UTC)	Spacecraft	Event	Remarks
16 February	Cassini	90th flyby of Titan	Closest approach: 1,978 kilometres (1,229 mi).
9 March	Cassini	4th flyby of Rhea	Closest approach: 997 kilometres (620 mi). Last Cassini flyby of Rhea.
5 April	Cassini	91st flyby of Titan	Closest approach: 1,400 kilometres (870 mi).
12 April	Cassini	Flyby of Polydeuces	Closest approach: 115,000 kilometres (71,000 mi).
23 May	Cassini	92nd flyby of Titan	Closest approach: 970 kilometres (600 mi).
10 July	Cassini	93rd flyby of Titan	Closest approach: 964 kilometres (599 mi).
26 July	Cassini	94th flyby of Titan	Closest approach: 1,400 kilometres (870 mi).
12 September	Cassini	95th flyby of Titan	Closest approach: 1,400 kilometres (870 mi).
6 October	LADEE	Injection into Selenocentric orbit	Preliminary orbit was 269 kilometres (167 mi) x 15,772 kilometres (9,800 mi), inclined 157 deg to the equator.
9 October	Juno	Flyby of Earth	Gravity assist, closest approach: 552 kilometres (343 mi).
13 October	Cassini	96th flyby of Titan	Closest approach: 961 kilometres (597 mi).
30 November	Cassini	97th flyby of Titan	Closest approach: 870 kilometres (540 mi).
6 December	Chang'e 3	Injection into Selenocentric orbit	Preliminary orbit was 100 kilometres (62 mi), reduced to 15 kilometres (9.3 mi) on 10 December.
14 December	Chang'e 3	Landing at Mare Imbrium	First Chinese lunar soft lander and rover, coordinates 44.1214°N 19.5116°W.
28 December	Mars Express	Flyby of Phobos	Closest approach: 45 kilometres (28 mi).

== Extra-Vehicular Activity (EVAs) ==
Start Date/Time	Duration	End Time	Spacecraft	Crew	Remarks
19 April; 14:03	6 hours 38 minutes	20:41	Expedition 35/36 ISS Pirs	(Russia) Pavel Vinogradov (Russia) Roman Romanenko	Installed the Obstanovka plasma waves and ionosphere experiment to the exterior of the Zvezda service module. Also replaced a faulty retro-reflector device used as navigational aids for the Automatic Transfer Vehicle and retrieved the Biorisk microbe exposure experiment. An attempt to retrieve the Vinoslivost materials sample experiment failed when it was accidentally dropped while being taken back to the Pirs module airlock.
11 May; 12:44	5 hours 30 minutes	18:14	Expedition 35/36 ISS Quest	(United States) Christopher Cassidy (United States) Thomas Marshburn	Replaced the 2B Pump Flow Control Subassembly (PFCS) on the Port 6 truss in attempting to locate the source of an ammonia coolant leak on the Port 6 truss Photo Voltaic Thermal Control System (PVTCS).
24 June; 13:32	6 hours 34 minutes	20:06	Expedition 36/37 ISS Pirs	(Russia) Fyodor Yurchikhin (Russia) Aleksandr Misurkin	Replaced a fluid flow regulator on the Zarya module, testing of the Kurs docking system on the station ahead of the arrival of a new Russian module, installing the "Indicator" experiment, installing gap spanners on to the outside of the station and photographing the multilayer insulation (MLI) protecting the Russian segment from micrometeoroids and taking samples from the exterior surface of the pressure hull underneath the MLI to identify signs of pressure hull material microscopic deterioration.
9 July; 12:02	6 hours 7 minutes	18:09	Expedition 36/37 ISS Quest	(United States) Christopher Cassidy (Italy) Luca Parmitano	Replaced a failed Space-to-Ground Transmitter Receiver Controller and the Mobile Base Camera Light Pan-Tilt Assembly, retrieved the MISSE-8 and ORMatE-III experiments, photographed the AMS-02, moved two Radiator Grapple Bars to either sides of the truss, routed power cables to support the addition of the new Russian MLM and installed a multi-layer insulation cover to protect the docking interface of PMA-2.
16 July; 11:57	1 hours 32 minutes	13:29	Expedition 36/37 ISS Quest	(United States) Christopher Cassidy (Italy) Luca Parmitano	Installed a Y-bypass jumper on power lines on the Z1 truss, routing 1553 data cables for a grapple fixture and Ethernet cables for a future Russian station module. The spacewalk was then cut short after Parmitano reported excess water leaking inside his helmet.
16 August; 14:36	7 hours 29 minutes	22:05	Expedition 36/37 ISS Pirs	(Russia) Fyodor Yurchikhin (Russia) Aleksandr Misurkin	Routed power and Ethernet cables for later attachment to the future Nauka module. Also installed connectors between modules and a material science experiment.
22 August; 11:34	5 hours 58 minutes	17:32	Expedition 36/37 ISS Pirs	(Russia) Fyodor Yurchikhin (Russia) Aleksandr Misurkin	Removed a laser communication and installed an EVA work station and camera pointing platform outside the Zvezda service module, inspection and tightening of various antenna covers on Zvezda, and installed new spacewalk aids.
9 November; 14:34	5 hours 50 minutes	20:24	Expedition 37/38 ISS Pirs	(Russia) Oleg Kotov (Russia) Sergey Ryazansky	Took the Olympic torch for the 2014 Winter Olympic Games to the outside of ISS. They also continued work on an extravehicular activity workstation and biaxial pointing platform by removing launch brackets and bolts, as well as retrieving an experimental package. The planned installation of a foot restraint on the mounting seat of the workstation was deferred to a future spacewalk after the spacewalkers noticed some issues with its alignment.
21 December; 12:01	5 hours 28 minutes	17:29	Expedition 38/39 ISS Quest	(United States) Richard Mastracchio (United States) Michael S. Hopkins	Removed ammonia fluid lines from Active Thermal Control System pump module; removed pump module from starboard truss and stowed it on Payload Orbital Replacement Unit Accommodation.
24 December; 11:53	7 hours 30 minutes	19:23	Expedition 38/39 ISS Quest	(United States) Richard Mastracchio (United States) Michael S. Hopkins	Retrieved spare ammonia pump module, installed it on starboard truss, and connected it to Loop A of Active Thermal Control System.
27 December; 13:00	8 hours 7 minutes	21:07	Expedition 38/39 ISS Pirs	(Russia) Oleg Kotov (Russia) Sergey Ryazansky	Attempted installation of 2 HD cameras for commercial Earth observation on the outside of the Zvezda module, cancelled after one of the cameras failed to provide data to the ground during testing. Also installed and jettisoned experimental equipment outside the Russian segment. Longest Russian EVA in history.

== Orbital launch statistics ==
=== By country ===
For the purposes of this section, the yearly tally of orbital launches by country assigns each flight to the country of origin of the rocket, not to the launch services provider or the spaceport. For example, Soyuz launches by Arianespace in Kourou are counted under Russia because Soyuz-2 is a Russian rocket.

Country	Launches	Successes	Failures	Partial failures
China	15	14	1	0
France	4	4	0	0
India	3	3	0	0
Italy	1	1	0	0
Japan	3	3	0	0
Russia	31 (Note: Includes two European Soyuz launches from Kourou, French Guiana by Arianespace)	28	2	1
South Korea	1 (Note: With Russian assistance)	1	0	0
Ukraine	4	4	0	0
United States	19	19	0	0
World	81	77	3	1

=== By rocket ===
- Antares 100
- Ariane 5
- Atlas V
- Delta II
- Delta IV
- Delta IV Heavy
- Falcon 9
- H-IIA
- H-IIB
- Long March 2
- Long March 3
- Long March 4
- Minotaur I
- Minotaur V
- PSLV
- Soyuz-U
- Soyuz-FG
- Soyuz-2 (Russia)
- Soyuz ST (Europe)
- Dnepr
- Proton-M
- Rokot
- Strela
- Zenit-3SL/SLB
- Others

==== By family ====
Family	Country	Launches	Successes	Failures	Partial failures	Remarks
Angara	Russia	1	1	0	0	
Antares	United States	2	2	0	0	Maiden flight
Ariane	France	4	4	0	0	
Atlas	United States	8	8	0	0	
Delta	United States	3	3	0	0	
Epsilon	Japan	1	1	0	0	Maiden flight
Falcon	United States	3	3	0	0	
H-II	Japan	2	2	0	0	
Kuaizhou	China	1	1	0	0	Maiden flight
Long March	China	14	13	1	0	
Minotaur	United States	2	2	0	0	
Pegasus	United States	1	1	0	0	
PSLV	India	3	3	0	0	
R-7	Russia	16	16	0	0	
R-36	Ukraine	2	2	0	0	
Universal Rocket	Russia	15	13	1	1	
Vega	Italy	1	1	0	0	
Zenit	Ukraine	2	1	1	0	

==== By type ====
Rocket	Country	Family	Launches	Successes	Failures	Partial failures	Remarks
Antares 100	United States	Antares	2	2	0	0	Maiden flight
Ariane 5	France	Ariane	4	4	0	0	
Atlas V	United States	Atlas	8	8	0	0	
Delta IV	United States	Delta	3	3	0	0	
Dnepr	Ukraine	R-36	2	2	0	0	
Epsilon	Japan	Epsilon	1	1	0	0	Maiden flight
Falcon 9	United States	Falcon	3	3	0	0	
H-IIA	Japan	H-II	1	1	0	0	
H-IIB	Japan	H-II	1	1	0	0	
Kuaizhou 1	China	Kuaizhou	1	1	0	0	Maiden flight
Long March 2	China	Long March	5	5	0	0	
Long March 3	China	Long March	3	3	0	0	
Long March 4	China	Long March	6	5	1	0	
Minotaur I	United States	Minotaur	1	1	0	0	
Minotaur V	United States	Minotaur	1	1	0	0	
Naro	Russia / South Korea	Angara	1	1	0	0	Final flight
Pegasus	United States	Pegasus	1	1	0	0	
PSLV	India	PSLV	3	3	0	0	
Proton	Russia	Universal Rocket	10	9	1	0	
Soyuz	Russia	R-7	8	8	0	0	
Soyuz-2	Russia	R-7	8	8	0	0	
UR-100	Russia	Universal Rocket	5	4	0	1	
Vega	Italy	Vega	1	1	0	0	
Zenit	Ukraine	Zenit	2	1	1	0	

==== By configuration ====
Rocket	Country	Type	Launches	Successes	Failures	Partial failures	Remarks
Antares 110	United States	Antares	2	2	0	0	Maiden flight
Ariane 5 ECA	France	Ariane 5	3	3	0	0	
Ariane 5 ES	France	Ariane 5	1	1	0	0	
Atlas V 401	United States	Atlas V	5	5	0	0	
Atlas V 501	United States	Atlas V	1	1	0	0	
Atlas V 531	United States	Atlas V	1	1	0	0	
Atlas V 551	United States	Atlas V	1	1	0	0	
Delta IV Medium+ (5,4)	United States	Delta IV	2	2	0	0	
Delta IV Heavy	United States	Delta IV	1	1	0	0	
Dnepr	Ukraine	Dnepr	2	2	0	0	
Epsilon	Japan	Epsilon	1	1	0	0	Maiden flight
Falcon 9 v1.0	United States	Falcon 9	1	1	0	0	Final flight
Falcon 9 v1.1	United States	Falcon 9	2	2	0	0	Maiden flight
H-IIA 202	Japan	H-IIA	1	1	0	0	
H-IIB	Japan	H-IIB	1	1	0	0	
Kuaizhou 1	China	Kuaizhou 1	1	1	0	0	Maiden flight
Long March 2C	China	Long March 2	2	2	0	0	
Long March 2D	China	Long March 2	2	2	0	0	
Long March 2F	China	Long March 2	1	1	0	0	
Long March 3B/E	China	Long March 3	3	3	0	0	
Long March 4B	China	Long March 4	2	1	1	0	
Long March 4C	China	Long March 4	4	4	0	0	
Minotaur I	United States	Minotaur I	1	1	0	0	
Minotaur V	United States	Minotaur V	1	1	0	0	Maiden flight
Naro-1	Russia / South Korea	Naro	1	1	0	0	Final flight
Pegasus-XL	United States	Pegasus	1	1	0	0	
PSLV-CA	India	PSLV	1	1	0	0	
PSLV-XL	India	PSLV	2	2	0	0	
Proton-M / Briz-M	Russia	Proton	9	9	0	0	
Proton-M / Blok DM-03	Russia	Proton	1	0	1	0	
Rokot / Briz-KM	Russia	UR-100	4	3	0	1	
Soyuz-2.1a	Russia	Soyuz-2	1	1	0	0	
Soyuz-2.1a / Fregat-M	Russia	Soyuz-2	1	1	0	0	
Soyuz-2.1b	Russia	Soyuz-2	2	2	0	0	
Soyuz-2.1b / Fregat-M	Russia	Soyuz-2	1	1	0	0	
Soyuz ST-B / Fregat-MT	Russia	Soyuz-2	2	2	0	0	
Soyuz-2-1v / Volga	Russia	Soyuz-2	1	1	0	0	Maiden flight
Soyuz-FG	Russia	Soyuz	4	4	0	0	
Soyuz-U	Russia	Soyuz	4	4	0	0	
Strela	Russia	UR-100	1	1	0	0	
Vega	Italy	Vega	1	1	0	0	
Zenit-3SL	Ukraine	Zenit	1	0	1	0	
Zenit-3SLB	Ukraine	Zenit	1	1	0	0	

=== By spaceport ===
- Jiuquan
- Taiyuan
- Xichang
- Kourou
- Satish Dhawan
- Ocean Odyssey
- Tanegashima
- Uchinoura
- Baikonur
- Naro
- Dombarovsky
- Plesetsk
- Cape Canaveral
- Kennedy
- MARS
- Vandenberg

Site	Country	Launches	Successes	Failures	Partial failures	Remarks
Baikonur	Kazakhstan	23	22	1	0	
Cape Canaveral	United States	10	10	0	0	
Dombarovsky	Russia	2	2	0	0	
Kourou	France	7	7	0	0	
Jiuquan	China	7	7	0	0	
MARS	United States	4	4	0	0	
Naro	South Korea	1	1	0	0	
Ocean Odyssey	(United Nations) International waters	1	0	1	0	
Plesetsk	Russia	7	6	0	1	
Satish Dhawan	India	3	3	0	0	
Tanegashima	Japan	2	2	0	0	
Taiyuan	China	5	4	1	0	
Uchinoura	Japan	1	1	0	0	
Vandenberg	United States	5	5	0	0	Includes Pegasus-XL launch whose carrier aircraft took off from Vandenberg
Xichang	China	3	3	0	0	
Total		81	77	3	1	

=== By orbit ===
- Transatmospheric
- Low Earth
- Low Earth (ISS)
- Low Earth (SSO)
- Low Earth (retrograde)
- Medium Earth
- Geosychronous
  (transfer)
- Inclined GSO
- High Earth
- Heliocentric

Orbital regime	Launches	Successes	Failures	Accidentally achieved	Remarks
Transatmospheric	0	0	0	0	
Low Earth	48	47	1	0	12 to ISS, 1 to Tiangong-1
Medium Earth / Molniya	4	3	1	0	
Geosynchronous / GTO	24	23	1	0	
High Earth / Lunar transfer	3	3	0	0	MOM was initially placed in a highly elliptical Earth orbit and performed Trans-Mars injection under its own power
Heliocentric / Planetary transfer	2	2	0	0	
Total	81	78	3	0	
