= USA-246 =

United States Space Force military communications satellite constellation

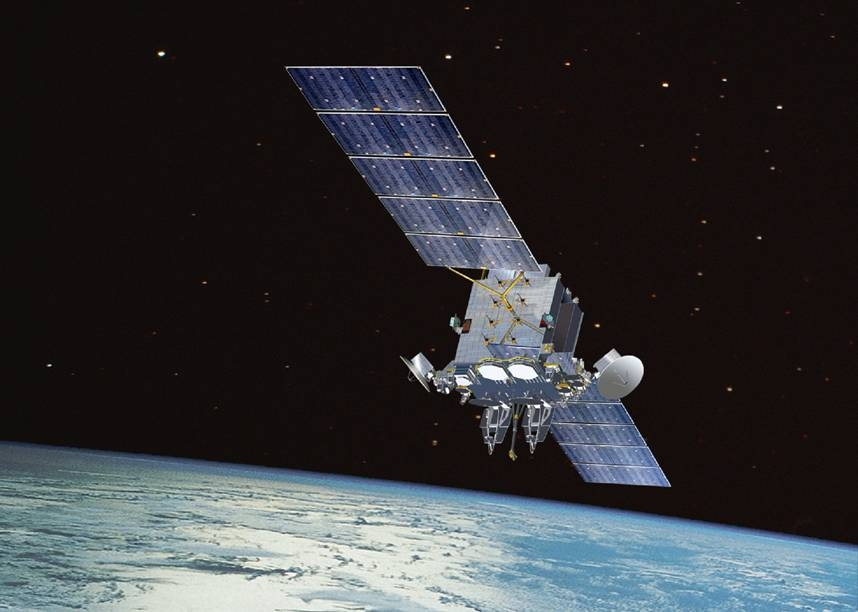
- Artist's impression of an AEHF-3 satellite
- Names: AEHF-3; Advanced Extremely High Frequency-3
- Mission type: Military communications
- Operator: United States Air Force / United States Space Force
- COSPAR ID: 2013-050A
- SATCAT no.: 39256
- Website: https://www.spaceforce.mil/
- Mission duration: 14 years (planned); 11 years, 6 months and 8 days (in progress)

Spacecraft properties
- Spacecraft: AEHF-3
- Bus: A2100M
- Manufacturer: Lockheed Martin Space
- Launch mass: 6,168 kg (13,598 lb)

Start of mission
- Launch date: 18 September 2013, 08:10:00 UTC
- Rocket: Atlas V 531 (AV-041)
- Launch site: Cape Canaveral, SLC-41
- Contractor: United Launch Alliance

Orbital parameters
- Reference system: Geocentric orbit
- Regime: Geosynchronous orbit

USA-246, also known as Advanced Extremely High Frequency 3 or AEHF-3, is a military communications satellite operated by the United States Air Force. It is the third of six satellites to be launched as part of the Advanced Extremely High Frequency program, which replaced the earlier Milstar system.

== Satellite ==
The USA-246 satellite was constructed by Lockheed Martin Space, and is based on the A2100 satellite bus. The satellite has a mass of 6,168 kg (13,598 lb) and a design life of 14 years. It will be used to provide super high frequency (SHF) and extremely high frequency (EHF) communications for the United States Armed Forces, as well as those of the United Kingdom, the Netherlands, and Canada.

== Launch ==
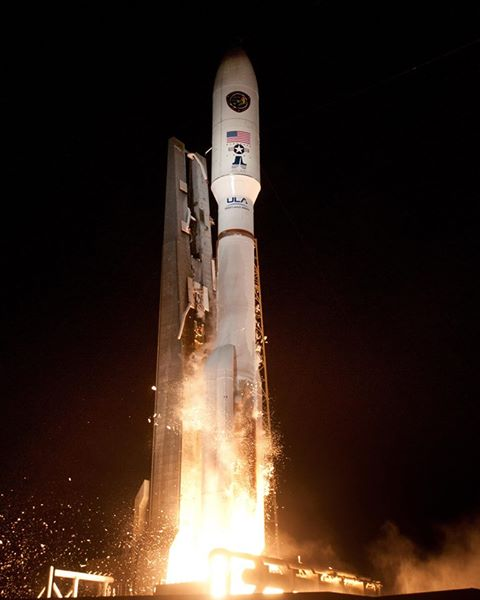
Launch of AEHF-3 on an Atlas V

USA-246 was launched by United Launch Alliance, aboard an Atlas V 531 flying from Space Launch Complex 41 (SLC-41) at the Cape Canaveral Air Force Station (CCAFS). After a number of weather-related delays, the launch occurred at 08:10:00 UTC on 18 September 2013, placing the satellite in a parking orbit of 178 kilometers by 1,041 kilometers. A second burn placed the satellite into a geostationary transfer orbit (GTO) with a perigee of 225 km (140 mi), an apogee of 50,051 km (31,100 mi), and 20.52° inclination. The satellite was successfully deployed in this orbit 50 minutes after launch.

== See also ==
- 2013 in spaceflight
