= Progress M-18M =

Spacecraft that resupplied the International Space Station in 2013

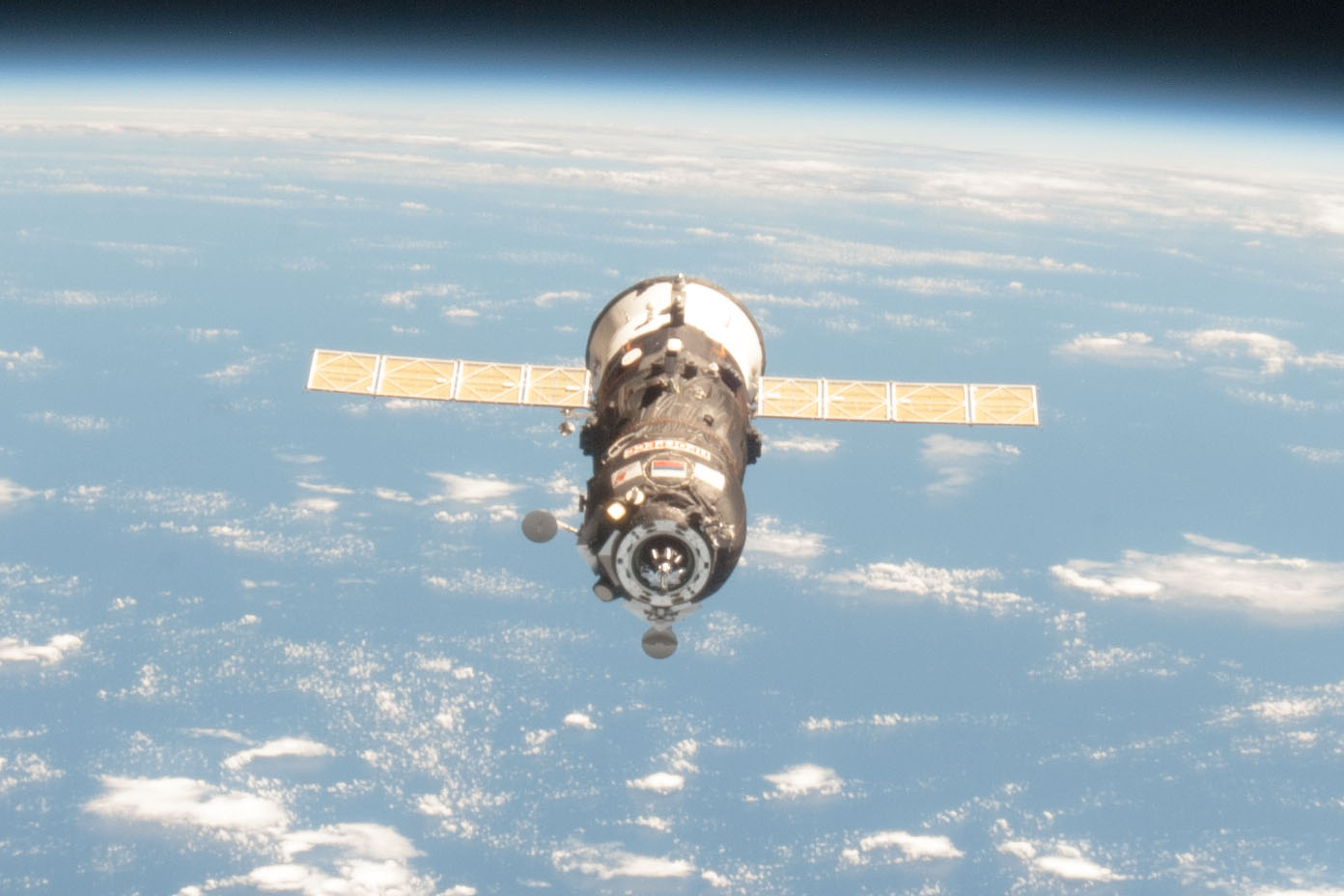
- Progress M-18M approaches the ISS on 11 February 2013.
- Mission type: ISS resupply
- Operator: Roskosmos
- COSPAR ID: 2013-007A
- SATCAT no.: 39082
- Mission duration: 165 days

Spacecraft properties
- Spacecraft type: Progress-M s/n 418
- Manufacturer: RKK Energia
- Launch mass: 6950 kg

Start of mission
- Launch date: 11 February 2013, 14:41:46 UTC
- Rocket: Soyuz-U
- Launch site: Baikonur, Site 1/5

End of mission
- Disposal: Deorbited
- Decay date: 26 July 2013, 00:42 UTC

Orbital parameters
- Reference system: Geocentric
- Regime: Low Earth
- Perigee altitude: 401 km
- Apogee altitude: 417 km
- Inclination: 51.6°
- Period: 92.74 minutes
- Epoch: 11 February 2013

Docking with ISS
- Docking port: Pirs
- Docking date: 12 February 2013, 20:35 UTC
- Undocking date: 25 July 2013, 20:43 UTC
- Time docked: 164 days

Cargo
- Mass: 2638 kg
- Pressurised: 1368 kg (dry cargo)
- Fuel: 346 kg
- Gaseous: 50 kg
- Water: 420 kg
- Progress ISS Resupply

Progress M-18M (Russian: Прогресс М-18М), identified by NASA as Progress 50P, is a Progress spacecraft used by Roskosmos to resupply the International Space Station during 2013. Progress M-18M was sent on a four-orbit rendezvous profile that was already demonstrated by the Progress M-16M and Progress M-17M spacecraft in 2012.

== Launch ==
The spacecraft was launched on time at 14:41:46 UTC on 11 February 2013 from the Baikonur Cosmodrome in Kazakhstan.

== Docking ==
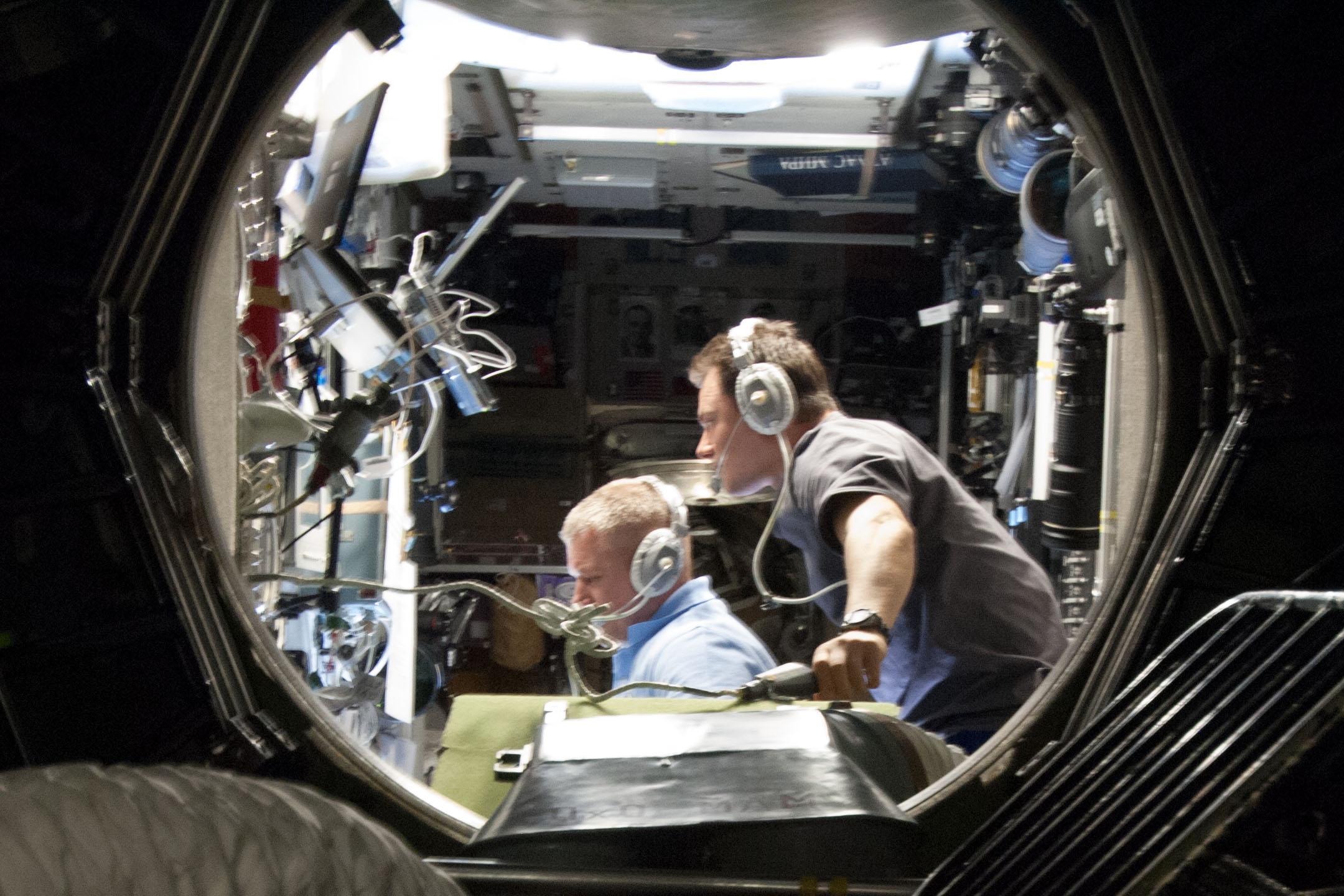
Oleg Novitsky and Roman Romanenko monitor data at the TORU controls during the Progress M-18M approach to the ISS.

Progress M-18M docked with the Pirs at 20:35 UTC less than six hours after the launch. The successful docking climaxed the third successful Same-Day-Rendezvous in the International Space Station history.

== Cargo ==
Progress M-18M delivered about 346 kilograms (763 lb) of propellant, 50 kilograms (110 lb) of oxygen and air, 420 kilograms (930 lb) of water and about 1,368 kilograms (3,016 lb) of spare parts, science gear and other supplies (dry cargo) to the Space Station.

== Undocking and reentry ==
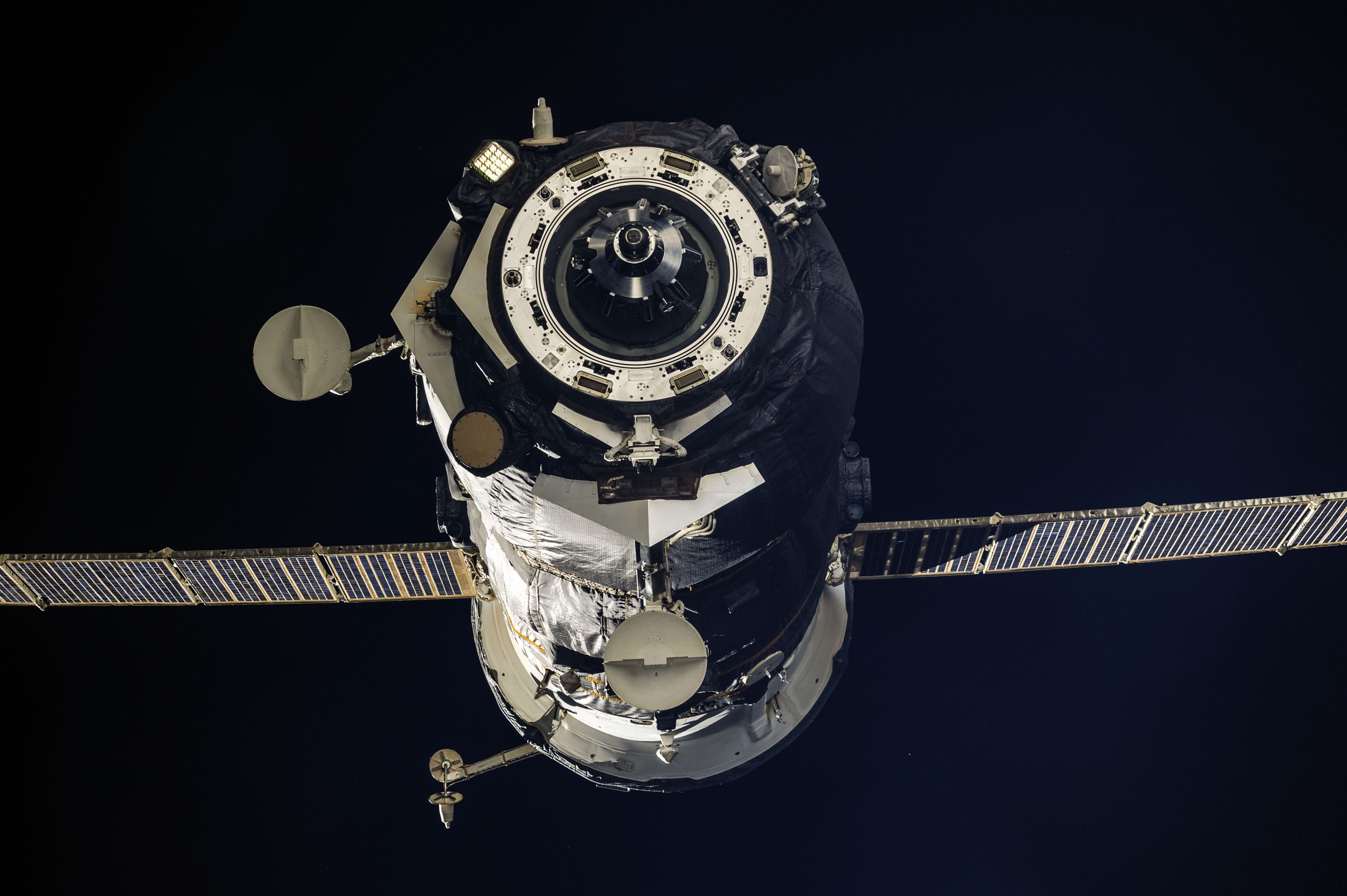
Progress M-18M departs the ISS on 25 July 2013.

Progress M-18M undocked from the ISS on 25 July 2013. The re-entry procedure started around 23:53 UTC, on 25 July 2013. The destruction occurred at 00:42 UTC, on 26 July 2013 in the Pacific Ocean.
