= Progress M-17M =

Russian spacecraft

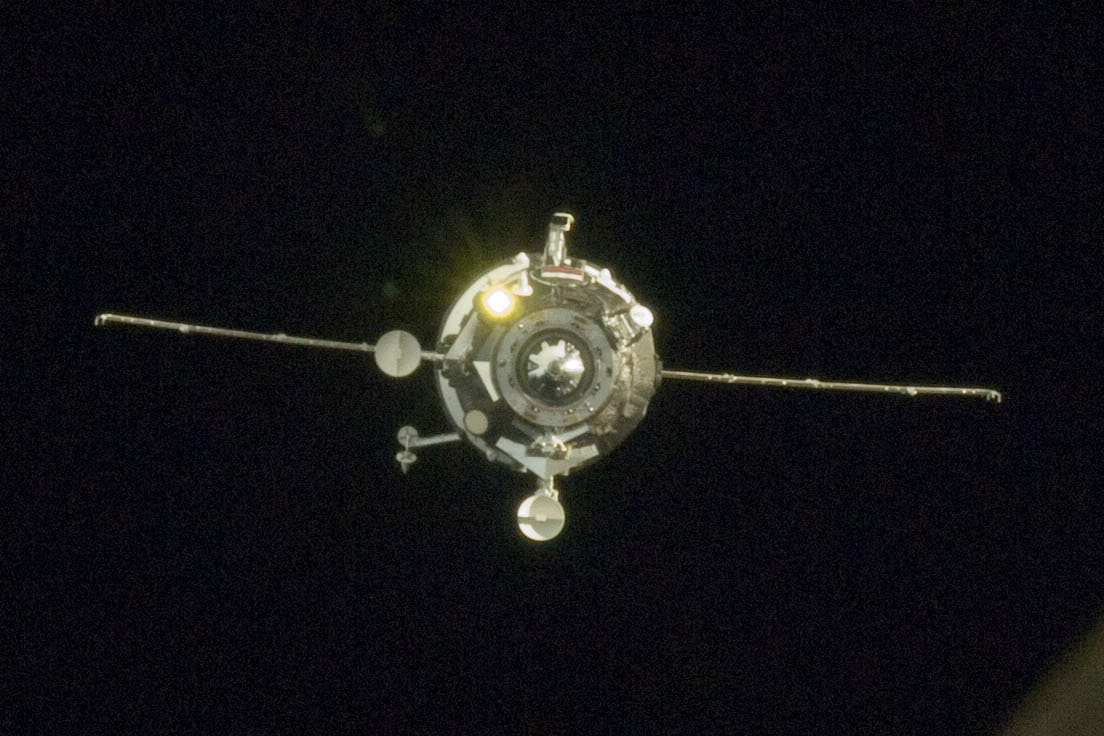
- Progress M-17M approaches the aft docking port of the Zvezda Module.
- Mission type: ISS resupply
- Operator: Roskosmos
- COSPAR ID: 2012-060A
- SATCAT no.: 38975
- Mission duration: 192 days

Spacecraft properties
- Spacecraft type: Progress-M s/n 417
- Manufacturer: RKK Energia
- Launch mass: 6950 kg

Start of mission
- Launch date: 31 October 2012, 07:41:19 UTC
- Rocket: Soyuz-U
- Launch site: Baikonur, Site 1/5

End of mission
- Disposal: Deorbited
- Decay date: 21 April 2013, 15:02:00 UTC

Orbital parameters
- Reference system: Geocentric
- Regime: Low Earth
- Perigee altitude: 193.0 km
- Apogee altitude: 245.0 km
- Inclination: 51.66°
- Period: 88.58 minutes
- Epoch: 31 October 2012

Docking with ISS
- Docking port: Zvezda
- Docking date: 31 October 2012, 13:40:00 UTC
- Undocking date: 15 April 2013, 12:02 UTC
- Time docked: 166 days

Cargo
- Mass: 2397 kg
- Pressurised: 1247 kg (dry cargo)
- Fuel: 683 kg
- Gaseous: 47 kg (oxygen and air)
- Water: 420 kg
- Progress ISS Resupply

Progress M-17M (Russian: Прогресс М-17М), identified by NASA as Progress 49P, was a Progress spacecraft used by Roskosmos to resupply the International Space Station during 2012. The seventeenth Progress-M 11F615A60 spacecraft to launch, it had the serial number 417 and was built by RKK Energia. It was the 130th launch to the ISS and the twentieth Russian space launch in 2012. It was also the eleventh mission for the R-7 family of rockets since the beginning of the year.

On 15 April 2013, Progress M-17M cargo ship undocked from the Space Station. It was disposed six days later and fell into the Pacific Ocean on 21 April 2013.

== Launch ==
The spacecraft was launched on time at 07:41:19 UTC on 31 October 2012 from Site 1/5 of the Baikonur Cosmodrome in Kazakhstan, atop a Soyuz-U carrier rocket. It was successfully deployed into low Earth orbit ten minutes later. At the time of launch, the ISS was about 1,550 kilometres (960 mi) ahead of the launch site. At the time of orbital insertion Progress was 3,610 kilometres (2,240 mi) behind the ISS.

== Docking ==
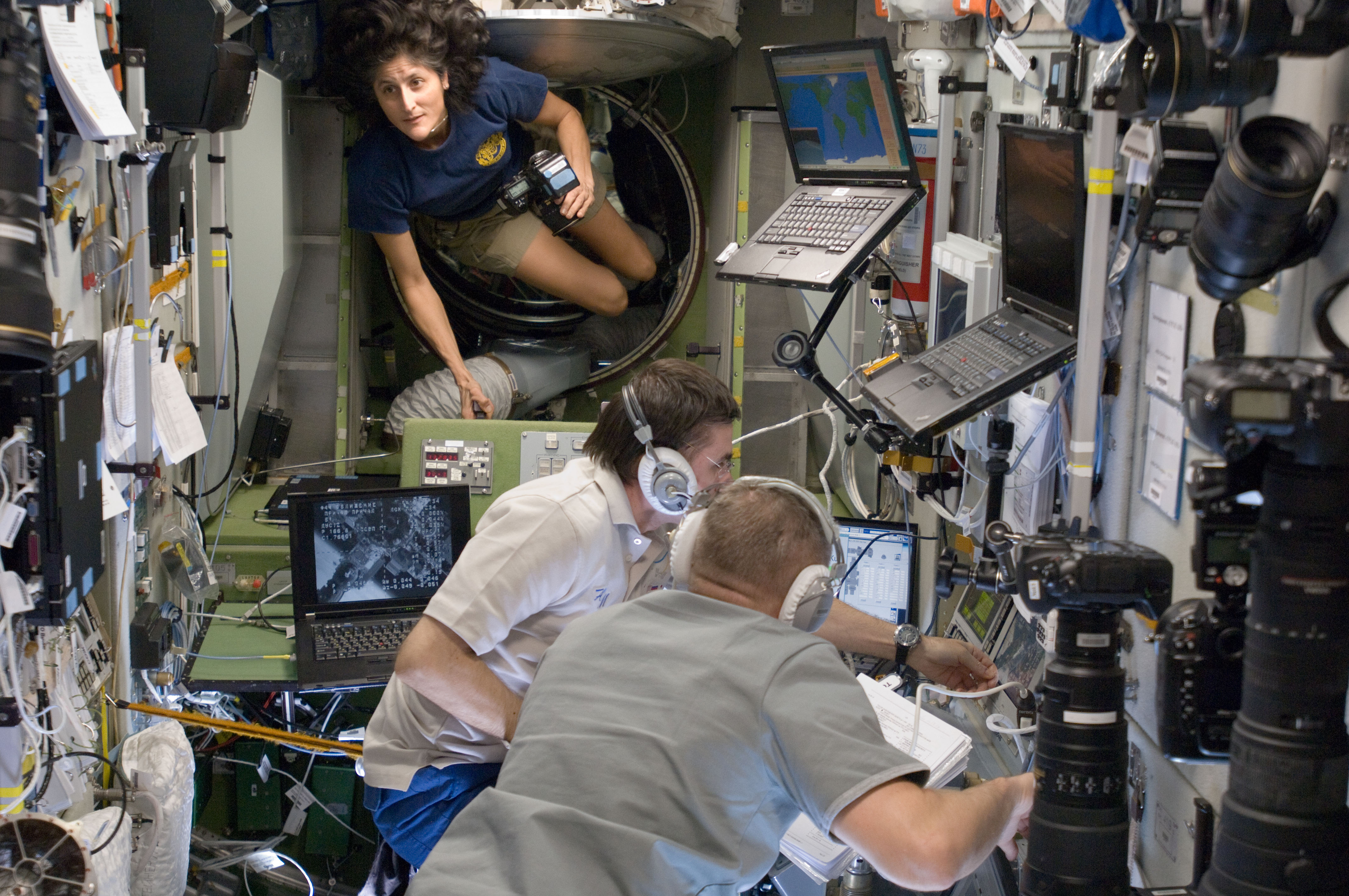
Yuri Malenchenko and Oleg Novitsky monitor data at the TORU controls during the Progress M-17 approach to the ISS. Commander Sunita Williams was there.

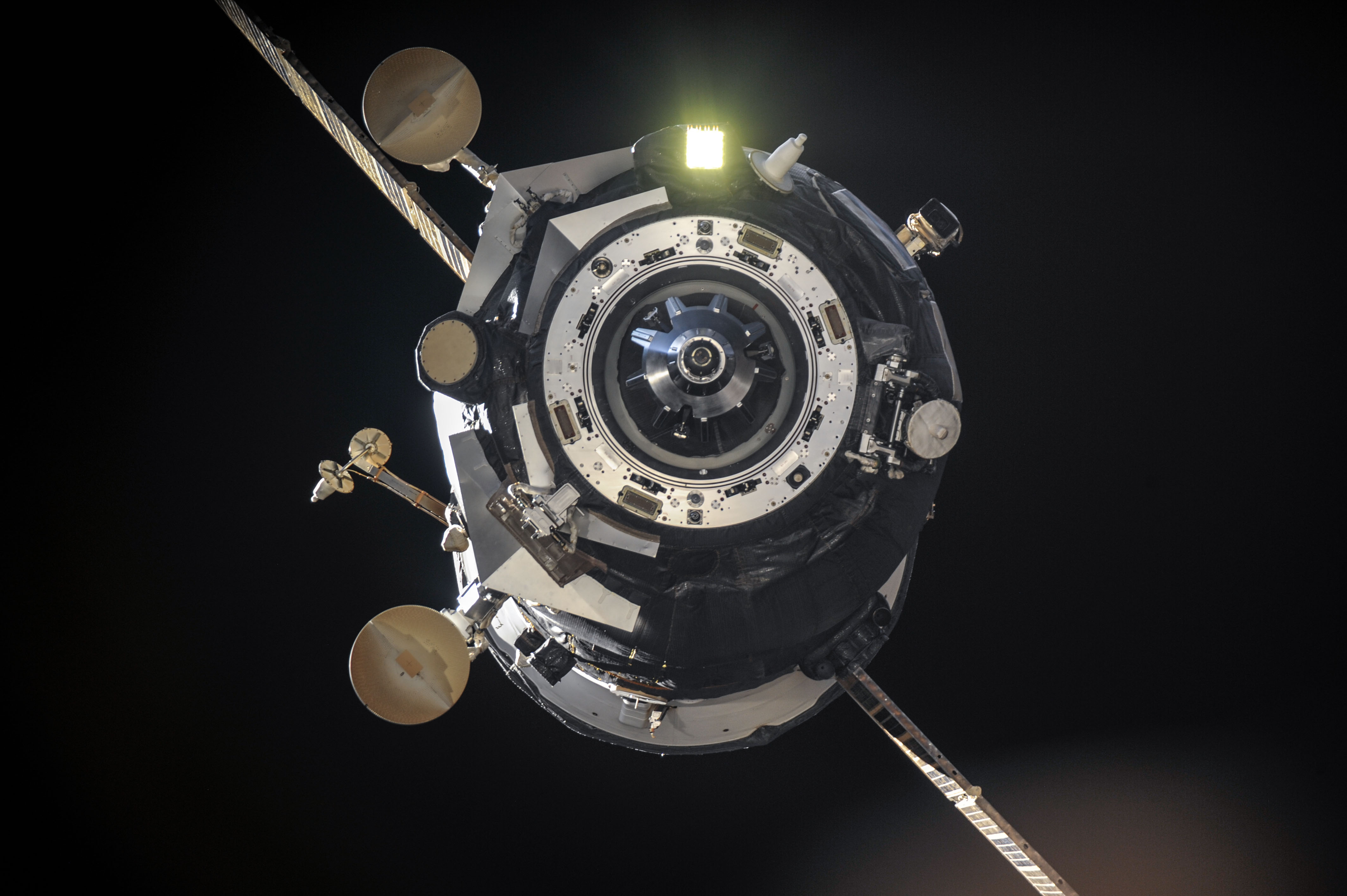
Progress M-17M leaves the aft docking port of the Zvezda Module on 15 April 2013.

Like the previous mission, Progress M-16M, Progress M-17M used a fast approach profile to the ISS, rendezvousing and docking on its fourth orbit, by opposition to 50 hours after the launch on most previous Progress flights. This profile allowed the transportation of critical biological payloads to the ISS. Following testing on Progress flights, the same rendezvous profile was introduced for crewed Soyuz flights in 2013 to reduce crew fatigue.

During the rendezvous sequence, the spacecraft performed several burns and rendezvous impulses to enter the proximity of the International Space Station. The KURS system on board the ISS as well as the Progress was activated for navigational purposes. The TV system was activated at a range of 8 kilometres (5.0 mi) as Progress M-17M continued its approach. Aboard the International Space Station, cosmonaut Yuri Malenchenko was standing by at the TORU system as Progress further came close to Space Station to assume manual control over the spacecraft if an issue with the automated docking was to be spotted. The other two cosmonauts Oleg Novitsky and Evgeny Tarelkin of Expedition 33 members were assisting Malenchenko and acquired engineering footage of the Progress spacecraft.

Progress M-17M initiated its flyaround, upon reaching a distance of 300 metres (980 ft) to Space Station. Then Progress M-17M entered stationkeeping at a range of 180 metres (590 ft). Russian Mission Controllers in Korolev, just outside Moscow verified that all systems on the spacecraft were performing nominally as well as the alignment with the docking port in the Zvezda module. With the final command approach issued, Progress fired its thrusters and followed a nominal approach profile. The docking to the Zvezda module occurred at 13:40 UTC on 31 October 2012, five hours fifty-nine minutes after launch. At the time of docking, the space station and the Progress were flying above Bogotá, Colombia.

== Undocking and decay ==
Progress M-17M undocked from the Space Station on 15 April 2013. The departure of the spacecraft cleared a docking port on the Zvezda module for the Progress M-19M resupply vehicle which was subsequently launched on 24 April 2013. In the following six days, the Progress M-17M spacecraft operated in an autonomous mode conducting a series of scientific experiments under the Radar-Progress project. At the end of the mission, Progress M-17M re-entered the Earth's atmosphere and fragments fell into the Pacific Ocean at 15:02 UTC on 21 April 2013.

== Cargo ==
Progress M-17M was packed with 1,247 kilograms (2,749 lb) of equipment, food, clothing, life support system gear (dry cargo), 683 kilograms (1,506 lb) of propellant to replenish reservoirs that feed the Russian maneuvering thrusters, 420 kilograms (930 lb) of water and 47 kilograms (104 lb) of oxygen and air.
