= Narvik University College =

Third level educational institution in Norway

Coordinates: 68°26′10″N 17°26′05″E

Logo

Narvik University College merged with the University of Tromsø (Norwegian: UiT - Norges arktiske universitet or UiT) from 1 January 2016 and is now named UiT - The Arctic University of Norway, campus Narvik. It has approximately 2000 students and 220 employees.

The campus offers bachelor's degrees in nursing, business and administration as well as engineering and various master's degrees in Technology. It also offers a PhD in technology.
