= Venus Spectral Rocket Experiment =

Suborbital rocket telescope

- Names: VeSpR
- Operator: NASA
- Website: www.bu.edu/csp/PASS/vespr/index.html
- Mission duration: 10 minutes

Spacecraft properties
- Manufacturer: Boston University

Start of mission
- Launch date: 01:50, November 27, 2013
- Rocket: 1st stage: Terrier missile 2nd stage: Black Brant
- Launch site: White Sands Missile Range

Orbital parameters
- Reference system: Suborbital
- Apogee altitude: 300 km (190 mi)

Main telescope
- Type: Cassegrain design
- Diameter: 35 cm (14 in)
- Wavelengths: Ultraviolet

The Venus Spectral Rocket Experiment (VeSpR) was a suborbital rocket telescope that collected data on the ultraviolet (UV) light that is being emitted from Venus's atmosphere, which can provide information about the history of water on Venus. Measurements of this type cannot be done using Earth-based telescopes because Earth's atmosphere absorbs most UV light before it reaches the ground.

== Objectives ==
The Venus Spectral Rocket Experiment (VeSpR) collected data on 27 November 2013, on the escape of water from Venus' atmosphere during the flight of the suborbital rocket. The sounding rocket carried the telescope above most of Earth's atmosphere where it could observe ultraviolet light from Venus that would normally be absorbed by Earth's atmosphere. Total flight time was less than 10 minutes, and the telescope can be recovered and reused.

== Sounding rocket ==
VeSpR is a two-stage system, combining a Terrier missile – originally built as a surface-to-air missile and later repurposed to support science missions – and a Black Brant model Mk1 sounding rocket with a telescope inside developed by the Center for Space Physics at Boston University.Integration took place at NASA's Wallops Flight Facility in Virginia.

The Terrier stage fires for only 6 seconds after launch before it burns out and separates from the Mk 1, having accelerating from zero to 2100 km/h (1300 mph). The Black Brant coasts upward for 6 seconds, before firing for about 30 seconds, taking the payload to a speed of over 7800 km/h (4800 mph). At that point the rocket is 46 km high, but it already has enough speed to coast upward for almost four more minutes, reaching its peak of 300 km (186 miles) before starting its descent back to Earth. The payload made its final descent with a parachute and touch down about 80 km (50 miles) downrange of the launch site, where it can be recovered.

== Science ==
The upper atmospheres of all three terrestrial planets are slowly evaporating into space, with the highest loss rate for the lightest atom, hydrogen. At Venus, solar UV radiation penetrates into the middle atmosphere, where photodissociation of H_{2}O by solar UV radiation releases H and O, which diffuse into the upper atmosphere and eventually reach the exobase. The H atoms may be lost into space, while relatively fewer O atoms escape, mainly due to non-thermal processes. Understanding the details of escape today is a requirement to be able to extrapolate into the past to learn the history of Venusian water.

The atmosphere of Venus is known to have undergone substantial evolution over geologic time. Evidence for this includes the present remarkable contrast between Venus’ atmosphere and the Earth's: Venus has very little water, a 95% CO_{2} atmosphere, a surface temperature of 750 K, and a surface pressure of 90 bar. The early Venusian atmosphere is thought to have undergone either a moist or runaway greenhouse heating episode to produce these conditions, and this would have included hydrodynamic escape of light gases from the upper atmosphere to deplete possibly as much as an ocean of water. Support for this scenario comes from the measured ratio of D/H in Venus' atmosphere of roughly 1.6% from the Pioneer Venus mass spectrometer, orbiting ion mass spectrometer (OIMS) data, and IR spectra of the night-side atmosphere. This large enhancement over cosmic abundances is consistent with the loss of an ocean's worth of H_{2}O over geologic time.

=== Telescope ===
The VeSpR telescope is a special-purpose Cassegrain design to accomplish observations that other missions are not able to perform. The use of a pre-dispersing prism to prevent long wavelengths from entering the spectrograph permits a long-aperture approach to echelle spectroscopy, and the chosen combination of imaging and dispersion scales provides high spectral resolution of emission line profiles with a several arc sec wide aperture for good sensitivity. For comparable spectral resolution the HST/STIS uses a 0.2 arc sec aperture, which provides 375 times less solid angle on the sky than a 3 x 5 arc sec region observed by this rocket telescope. For comparison, the ratio of telescope areas HST/rocket is roughly 50 times. With equivalent efficiencies, Hubble Space Telescope would need 4 hours of observing time to achieve the same S/N that the rocket obtains in 5 minutes. However, Hubble telescope is not allowed to point too close to the Sun to avoid damaging its instruments, so it cannot be used for this.

The VeSpR telescope is a Cassegrain design with a Dall-Kirkham figure, and with a 35 cm diameter ellipsoidal primary and a spherical secondary mirror providing 1–2 arc sec image quality within a few arc min of the optic axis. The telescope delivers a f/21 beam to the focal plane with a plate scale of 26 arc sec/mm. The spectrograph has been designed and constructed for UV echelle line profile measurements with long-slit imaging. The Ebert-Fastie configuration employed in the design of the spectrograph has many characteristics well suited to the science needs of this mission. Symmetric off-axis reflections from a single collimating mirror are employed to remove aberrations: the spatial resolution is limited by the telescope and the spectral resolution by the grating and aperture characteristics.

Use of a paraboloidal collimator, has produced 2 arc sec image quality with minimal astigmatism along the central 2–3 arc min. A 2 deg. magnesium fluoride (MgF_{2}) objective prism mounted forward of the aperture plate is used to disperse the converging beam from the telescope: with the 1216 Å image focused onto the primary aperture, other wavelengths are excluded from the spectrograph producing a very low level of scattered light on the detector.

The spectrograph uses a replica of a prototype grating for the Hubble Space Telescope STIS. For a 5 arc sec aperture width, the measured resolution in the last flight was 0.055 Å FWHM. A camera is included to re-image the focal plane onto a separate detector, providing an image of the telescope field of view minus the light which passes through the spectrograph aperture. The Venus image on the aperture plate will be sufficiently dispersed by the objective prism that the Ly α image will be clearly separated from the longer wavelength continuum and emissions.

== See also ==
- List of missions to Venus
- Observations and explorations of Venus
