= Toyama Prefectural University =

Public university in Imizu, Toyama Prefecture, Japan

Coordinates: 36°42′28.1″N 137°5′46.6″E

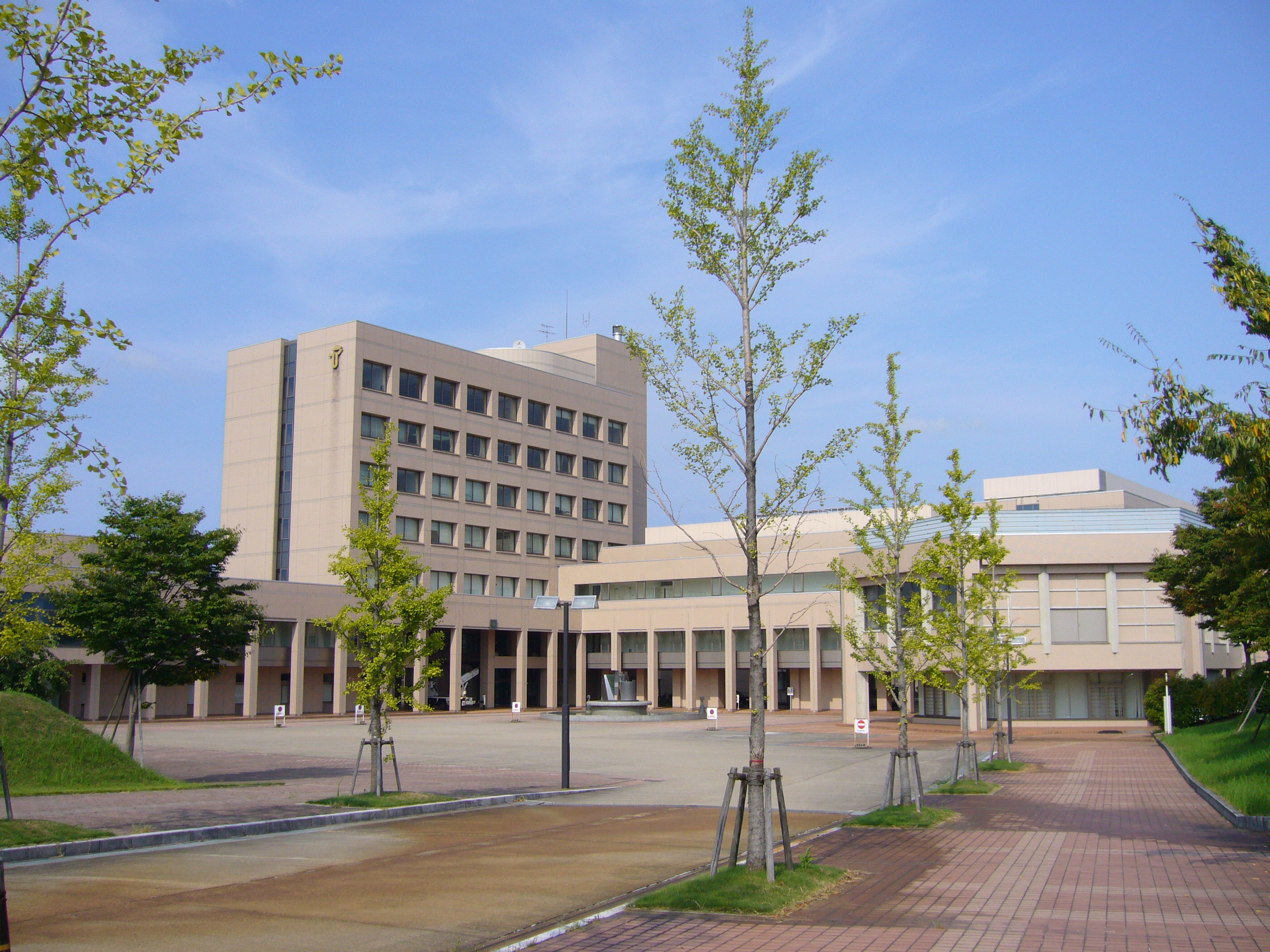
Toyama Prefectural University

Toyama Prefectural University (富山県立大学, Toyama kenritsu daigaku) is a public university at Imizu, Toyama, Japan. The predecessor of the school was founded in 1962, and it was chartered as a university in 1990.
