= Scramspace =

Australian hypersonic engine project

Scramspace was a hypersonic engine research project established by the University of Queensland, Australia's Centre for Hypersonics. It was a 1.8 meter long, free-flying, hypersonic scramjet. A scramjet is fundamentally an air-breathing engine that travels at hypersonic velocities. Built in Brisbane at an estimated cost of $14 million, it took approximately 3 years to complete. Scramspace was supposed to fire at a hypersonic velocity of Mach 8 or 8600 km/hour (5343 mph) but the flight-test turned out to be a failure and the rocket engine and the payload plummeted in the North Sea off the coast of Norway.

== Background ==
Scramspace was designed and built at Brisbane, Australia. It took 3 years to build and was estimated to cost around $14 million. It was approximated to fly at around Mach 8. It was the first and the largest research project funded by the Australian Space Research Program. A number of ground-based research tests and Mach 8 flight experiments were involved to establish the research project. A number of engineers and PhD scholars were involved in the making of this project.

Ground tests up to Mach 14 were performed to assess the scientific and technical parameters of the project. This was followed by flight tests up to Mach 8.

The project involved five countries in partnership: Australia, Japan, Germany, Italy, and the United States. It was led by the University of Queensland's Center for Hypersonics.

== Aftermath ==
In August 2013, the scramjet was airlifted to Norway for a final flight test at Mach 8. The engine was fabricated to reach an altitude of about 340 km( 211.266 miles) with the help of a two- stage rocket engine.

According to the experiment, on leaving the atmosphere, the scramjet had to separate from the rocket engine and re-orient itself for reentry. The flight -sensor data had to be collected in a three-second window before the scramjet disintegrated on reentry.

However, because of some unknown issue in the first stage rocket motor, the scramjet payload could not be delivered to the correct altitude and speed in the flight test conducted on September 18, 2013.

The uncrewed spacecraft with the payload and the rocket plummeted in the North Sea off the cost of Norway.

== Results ==
The final stage of the project did not yield any hypersonic flight data. However, the ground testing, modelling and analysis were able to provide reference results for future projects. The project provided valuable insight and results pertaining to hypersonic physics, hypersonic combustion, and the performance of materials and components. It set an example for future hypersonic aircraft research.
