= Eutelsat 3D =

Eutelsat communications satellite

- Mission type: Communications
- Operator: Eutelsat
- COSPAR ID: 2013-022A
- SATCAT no.: 39163
- Mission duration: 15 years (planned)

Spacecraft properties
- Bus: Spacebus 4000
- Manufacturer: Thales Alenia Space
- Launch mass: 5,470 kilograms (12,060 lb)

Start of mission
- Launch date: 14 May 2013, 16:02 UTC
- Rocket: Proton-M/Briz-M
- Launch site: Baikonur Cosmodrome 200/39
- Contractor: International Launch Services

Orbital parameters
- Reference system: Geocentric
- Regime: Geostationary
- Longitude: 3° east
- Perigee altitude: 35,782 kilometres (22,234 mi)
- Apogee altitude: 35,805 kilometres (22,248 mi)
- Inclination: 0.05 degrees
- Period: 1436.14 minutes (23.935 hrs)
- Epoch: 24 January 2015, 05:09:19 UTC

Transponders
- Band: 56 Ka and Ku transponders

Instruments
- Transponders, Footprints, and Frequency Bands

Eutelsat 3D is a communications satellite operated by Eutelsat, provides services to Europe, North Africa, the Middle East and Central Asia. It initially was located at 3° E in geosynchronous orbit in a fixed point above the equator, where Eutelsat already has two satellites, Eutelsat 3A and Eutelsat 3C. When Eutelsat 3B was launched in 2014 this satellite was moved to 7°E.

The satellite has four footprints and broadcasts on both the Ka band and the Ku band. Three footprints serve Europe, the Middle East, Central Asia and North Africa in both Ka and Ku bands. The fourth footprint covers sub-Saharan Africa but only in Ku band. It has 56 transponders in total. The satellite was built by Thales Alenia Space using their spacebus 4000 satellite bus.

The satellite was launched by International Launch Services from pad 39 at Site 200 at Baikonur Cosmodrome in Kazakhstan. The launch used a Proton-M with a Briz-M upper stage. The first three stages of the Proton fire for the first 9 minutes, 42 seconds. After that the Briz-M upper stage takes over with five separate burns until the spacecraft separates from the upper stage 9 hours and 13 minutes after launch.

The satellite launched on 14 May 2013 at 16:02 UTC and was successfully placed into geostationary transfer orbit. It was given the International Designator 2013-022A and the US satellite catalog reference 39163.
