= Progress M-19M =

Russian spacecraft

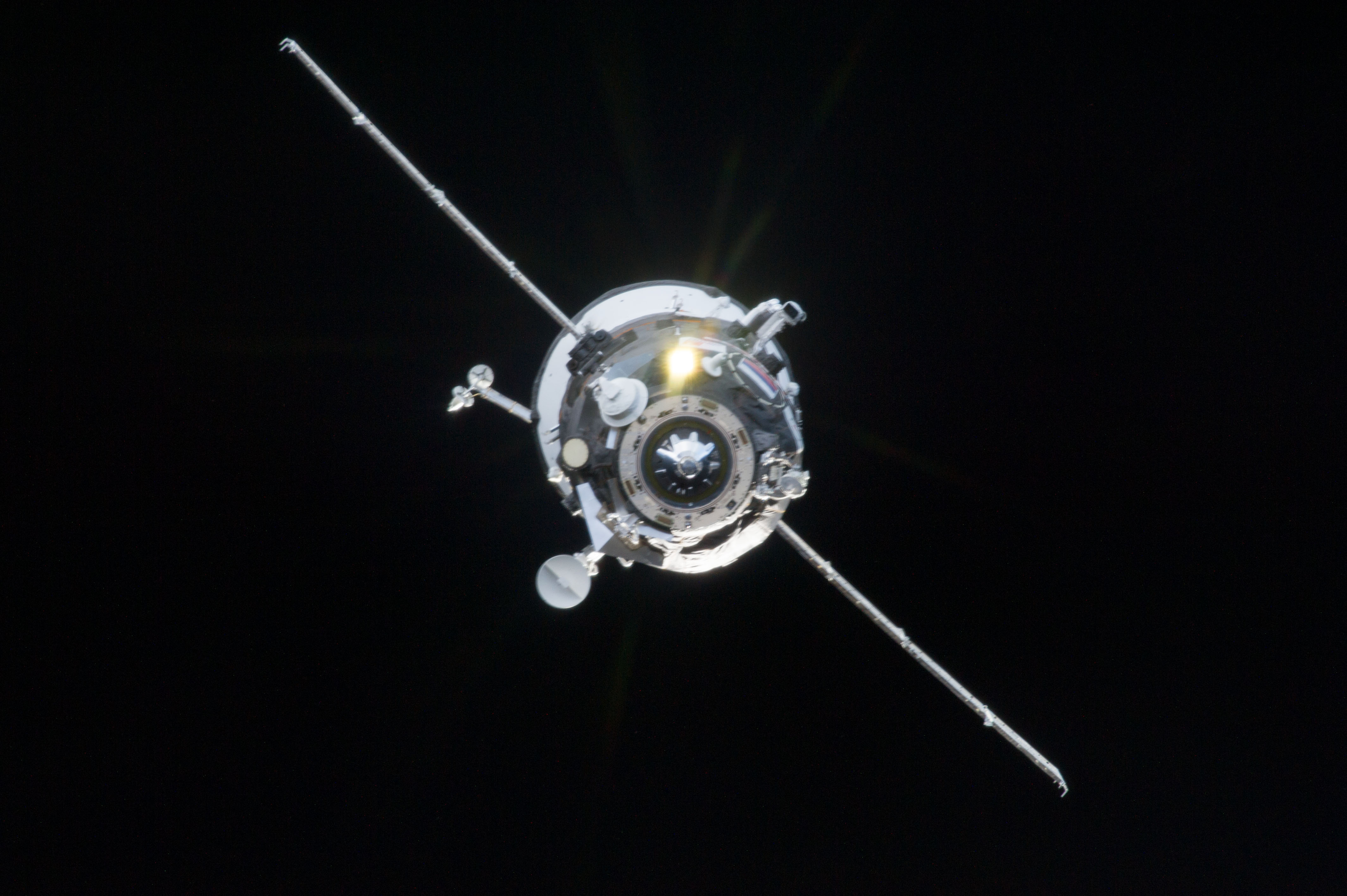
- Progress 51P with the undeployed 2–ASF-VKA antenna approaches the Zvezda service module.
- Mission type: ISS resupply
- Operator: Roskosmos
- COSPAR ID: 2013-017A
- SATCAT no.: 39148
- Mission duration: 56 days

Spacecraft properties
- Spacecraft type: Progress-M s/n 419
- Manufacturer: RKK Energia
- Launch mass: 6950 kg

Start of mission
- Launch date: 24 April 2013, 10:12:16 UTC
- Rocket: Soyuz-U
- Launch site: Baikonur, Site 1/5

End of mission
- Disposal: Deorbited
- Decay date: 19 June 2013, 13:39 UTC

Orbital parameters
- Reference system: Geocentric
- Regime: Low Earth
- Perigee altitude: 193.0 km
- Apogee altitude: 245.0 km
- Inclination: 51.6°
- Period: 88.59 minutes
- Epoch: 24 April 2013

Docking with ISS
- Docking port: Zvezda aft
- Docking date: 26 April 2013, 12:26:18 UTC
- Undocking date: 11 June 2013, 13:58 UTC
- Time docked: 46 days

Cargo
- Mass: 2366 kg
- Pressurised: 1543 kg (dry cargo)
- Fuel: 365 kg
- Gaseous: 48 kg
- Water: 410 kg
- Progress ISS Resupply

Progress M-19M (Russian: Прогресс М-19М), identified by NASA as Progress 51P, is a Progress spacecraft used by Roskosmos to resupply the International Space Station during 2013. Progress M-19M was launched on a standard 2-day rendezvous profile towards the ISS. The 19th Progress-M 11F615A60 spacecraft to be launched, it had the serial number 419 and was built by RKK Energia.

== Launch ==
The spacecraft was launched on time at 10:12:16 UTC on 24 April 2013 by a Soyuz-U carrier rocket flying from Site 1/5 at the Baikonur Cosmodrome in Kazakhstan.

The Progress spacecraft made it safely to orbit and deployed its solar arrays as planned. However one of the spacecraft's Kurs antenna, used for approach and docking, failed to deploy at the scheduled time.

== Docking ==
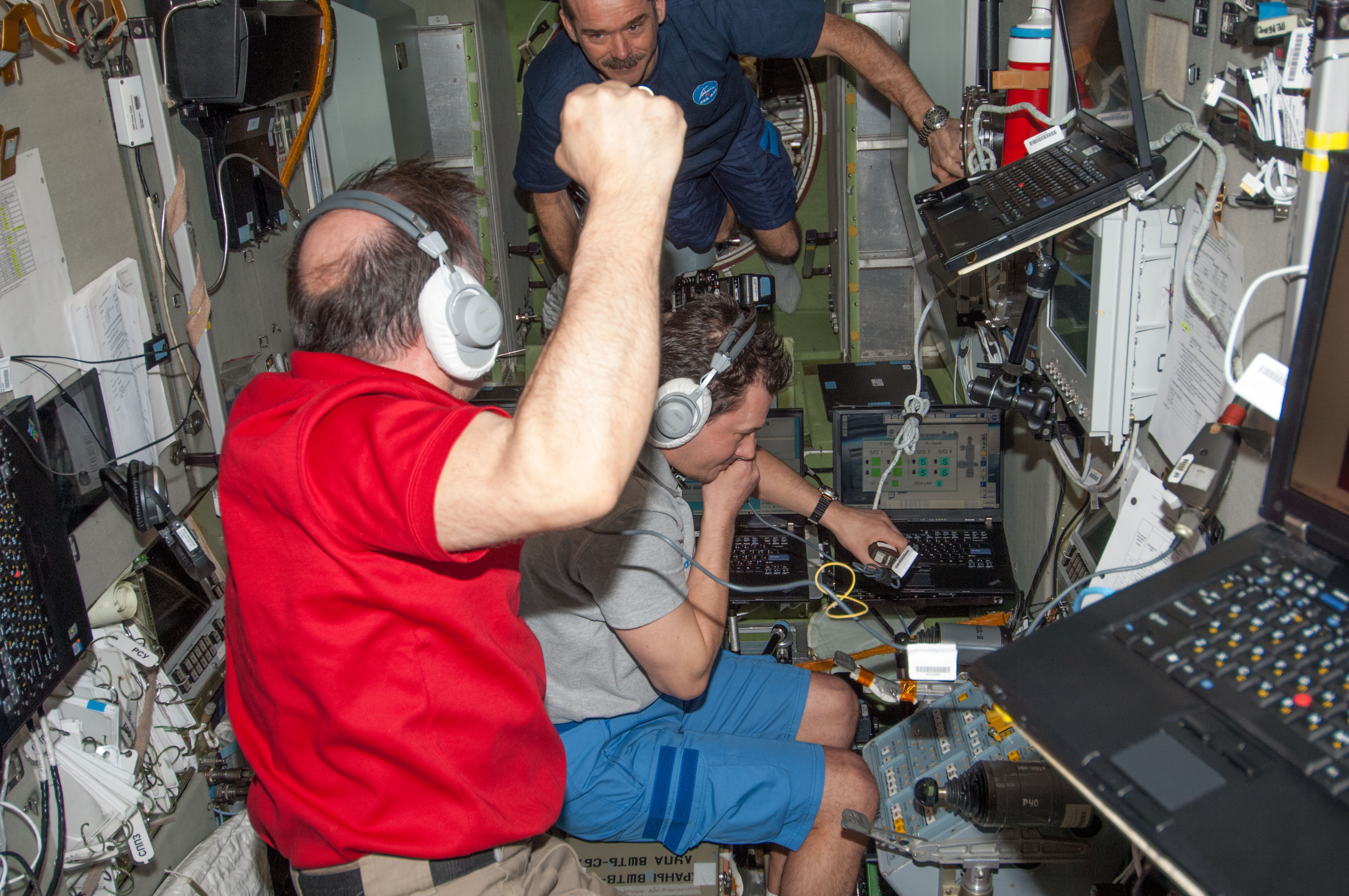
Pavel Vinogradov, Chris Hadfield and Roman Romanenko celebrate the successful docking of the Progress M-19M spacecraft.

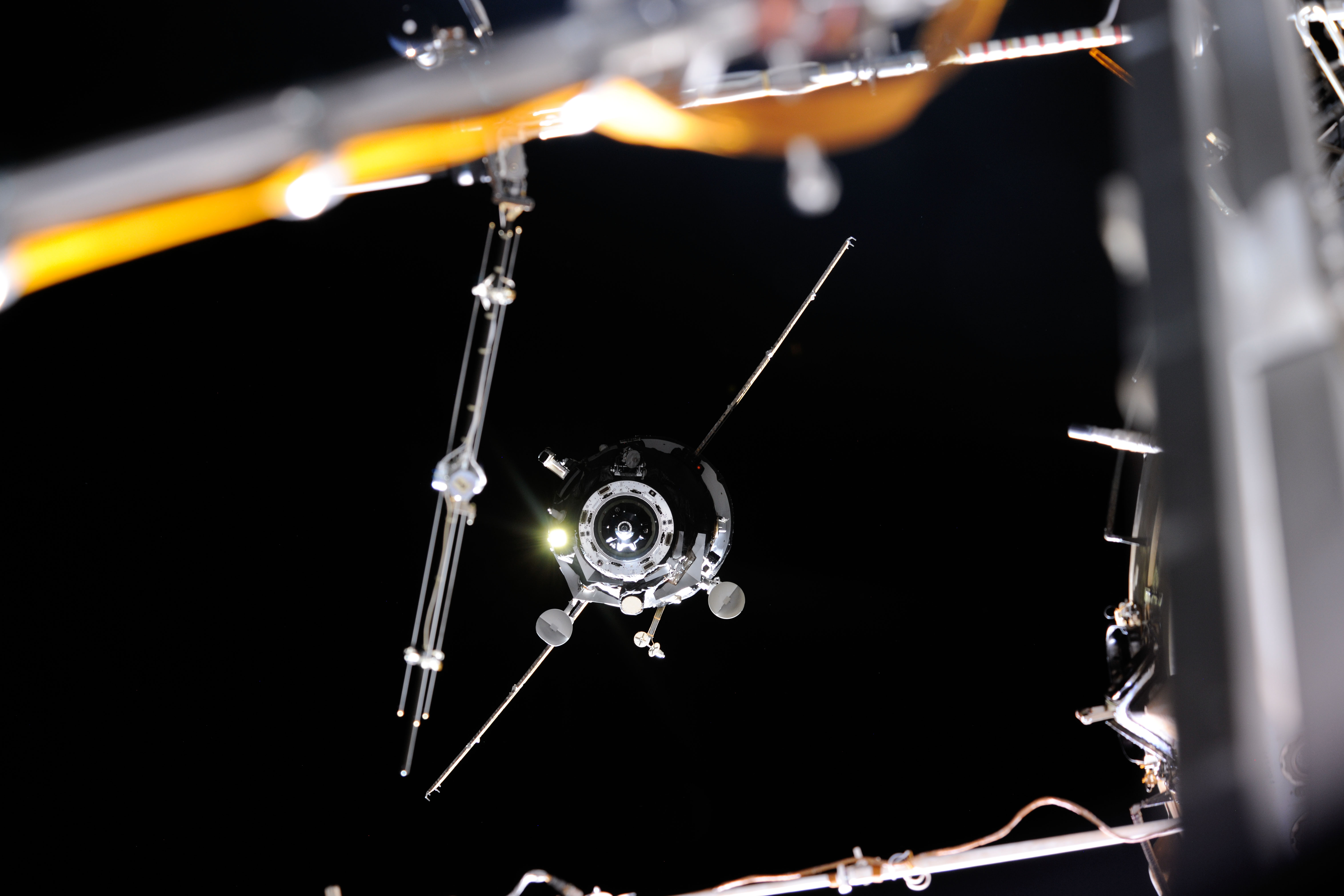
Progress M-19M leaves the aft docking port of the Zvezda Module on 11 June 2013.

Progress M-19M achieved soft docking with the ISS on April 26 at 12:25 UTC to the back docking port of the Zvezda Service Module, and hard docking was complete at 12:26:18 UTC. Due to the failure of the deployment of one of the spacecraft's Kurs antenna, a software patch was sent up from Russian controllers to bypass restrictions on the Kurs approach. The manual TORU system on standby with cosmonauts Roman Romanenko and Pavel Vinogradov on the controls in case of a Kurs failure. In the end the automated rendezvous and docking operation procedures using the Kurs docking system aboard the ISS and the Progress was used, although the docking velocity was slower than normal to give engineers a good look at the antenna through the station's camera system. During the docking the ISS and Progress M-19M were orbiting 420 kilometres (260 mi) above the Kazakhstan-China border.

The Expedition 35 crew opened the hatches and entered the Progress later on the day.

== Cargo ==
Progress M-19M delivered about 365 kilograms (805 lb) of propellant, 48 kilograms (106 lb) of oxygen and air, 410 kilograms (900 lb) of water and about 1,543 kilograms (3,402 lb) of spare parts, scientific equipment and other supplies (dry cargo) to the Space Station.

== Undocking and decay ==
Progress M-19M undocked from Zvezda module of the ISS on 11 June 2013 at 13:58 UTC. The undocking paved the way for European Space Agency's ATV-4 Albert Einstein to subsequently dock with the ISS.

Soon after the undocking, Progress M-19M entered an independent orbit to begin a one-week free flight and conducted the Radar-Progress experiment. The goal of the Radar-Progress experiment (also conducted on previous Progress flights) is to investigate the density, size and reflectivity of the ionosphere environment around the spacecraft due to engine burns. During the experiment, the spacecraft was tracked by the Institute of Solar Terrestrial Physics Siberian Branch of the Russian Academy of Sciences in Irkutsk.

At the end Radar-Progress experiment, on 19 June 2013 at 13:39 UTC, Progress M-19M performed a deorbit burn maneuver using the S5.80 engine of the RTDU-80 main propulsion system. The mission came to an end when the cargo ship performed destructive re-entry and plunged into the Pacific Ocean at 14:40 UTC, on 19 June 2013.
