= Progress M-49 =

Russian cargo spacecraft

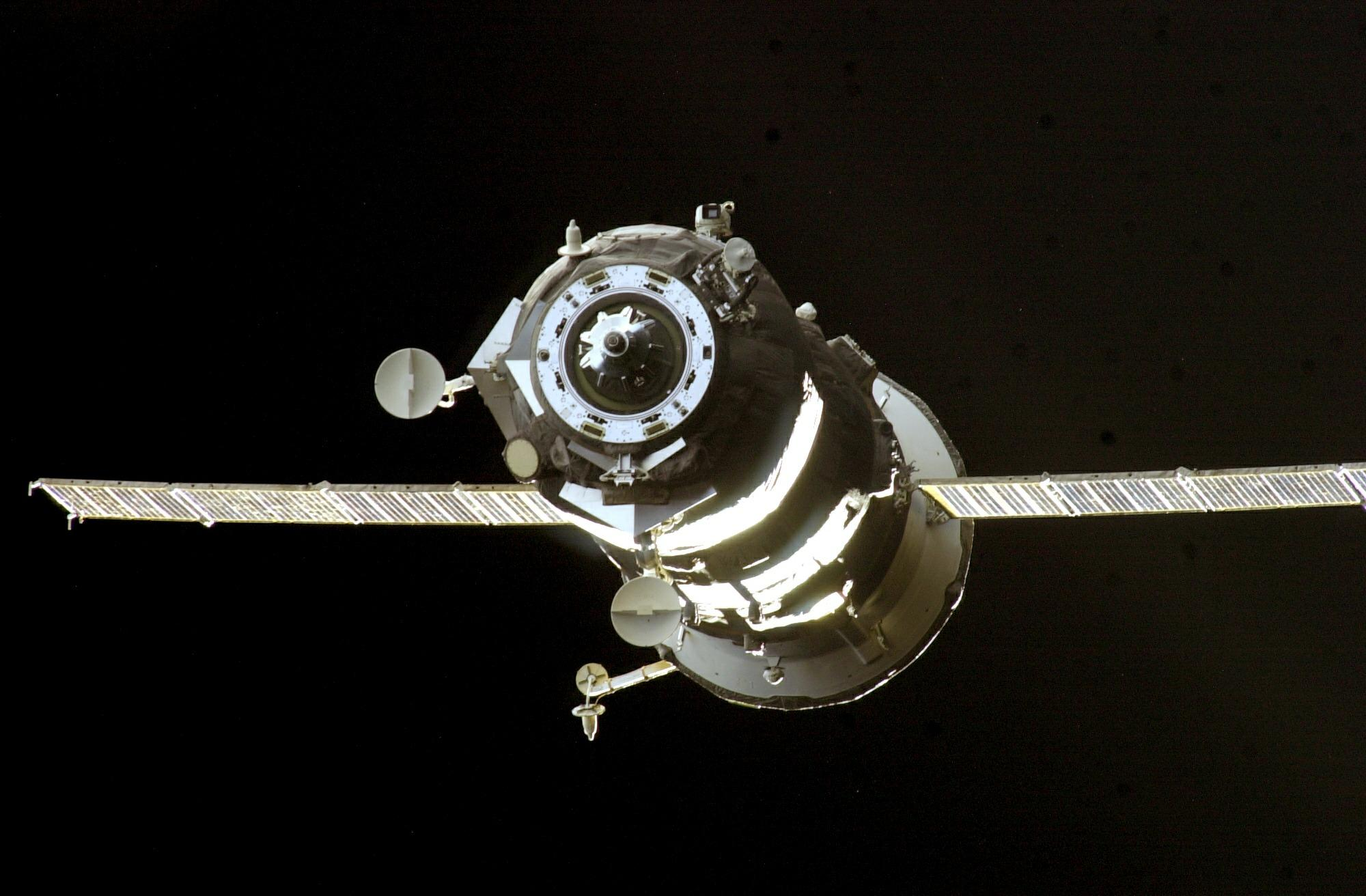
- Progress M-49 departing the ISS.
- Mission type: ISS resupply
- Operator: Roskosmos
- COSPAR ID: 2004-019A
- SATCAT no.: 28261
- Mission duration: 66 days

Spacecraft properties
- Spacecraft type: Progress-M s/n 249
- Manufacturer: RKK Energia

Start of mission
- Launch date: 25 May 2004, 12:34:23 UTC
- Rocket: Soyuz-U
- Launch site: Baikonur, Site 1/5

End of mission
- Disposal: Deorbited
- Decay date: 30 July 2004, 11:23:35 UTC

Orbital parameters
- Reference system: Geocentric
- Regime: Low Earth
- Perigee altitude: 236 km
- Apogee altitude: 246 km
- Inclination: 51.6°
- Period: 89.3 minutes
- Epoch: 25 May 2004

Docking with ISS
- Docking port: Zvezda aft
- Docking date: 27 May 2004, 13:54:43 UTC
- Undocking date: 30 July 2004, 06:04:48 UTC
- Time docked: 64 days

Cargo
- Mass: 2500 kg
- Progress ISS Resupply

Progress M-49 (Russian: Прогресс М-49), identified by NASA as Progress 14P, was a Progress spacecraft used to resupply the International Space Station. It was a Progress-M 11F615A55 spacecraft, with the serial number 249.

== Launch ==
Progress M-49 was launched by a Soyuz-U carrier rocket from Site 1/5 at the Baikonur Cosmodrome. Launch occurred at 12:34:23 UTC on 25 May 2004.

== Docking ==
The spacecraft docked with the aft port of the Zvezda module at 13:54:43 UTC on 27 May 2004. It remained docked for 64 days before undocking at 06:04:48 UTC on 30 July 2004 to make way for Progress M-50. It was deorbited at 10:37:00 GMT on the same day. The spacecraft burned up in the atmosphere over the Pacific Ocean, with any remaining debris landing in the ocean at around 11:23:35 UTC.

Progress M-49 carried supplies to the International Space Station, including food, water and oxygen for the crew and equipment for conducting scientific research.

== See also ==
- List of Progress flights
- Uncrewed spaceflights to the International Space Station
- Progress M-17M
