= Progress M-50 =

Russian spacecraft, in service in 2004

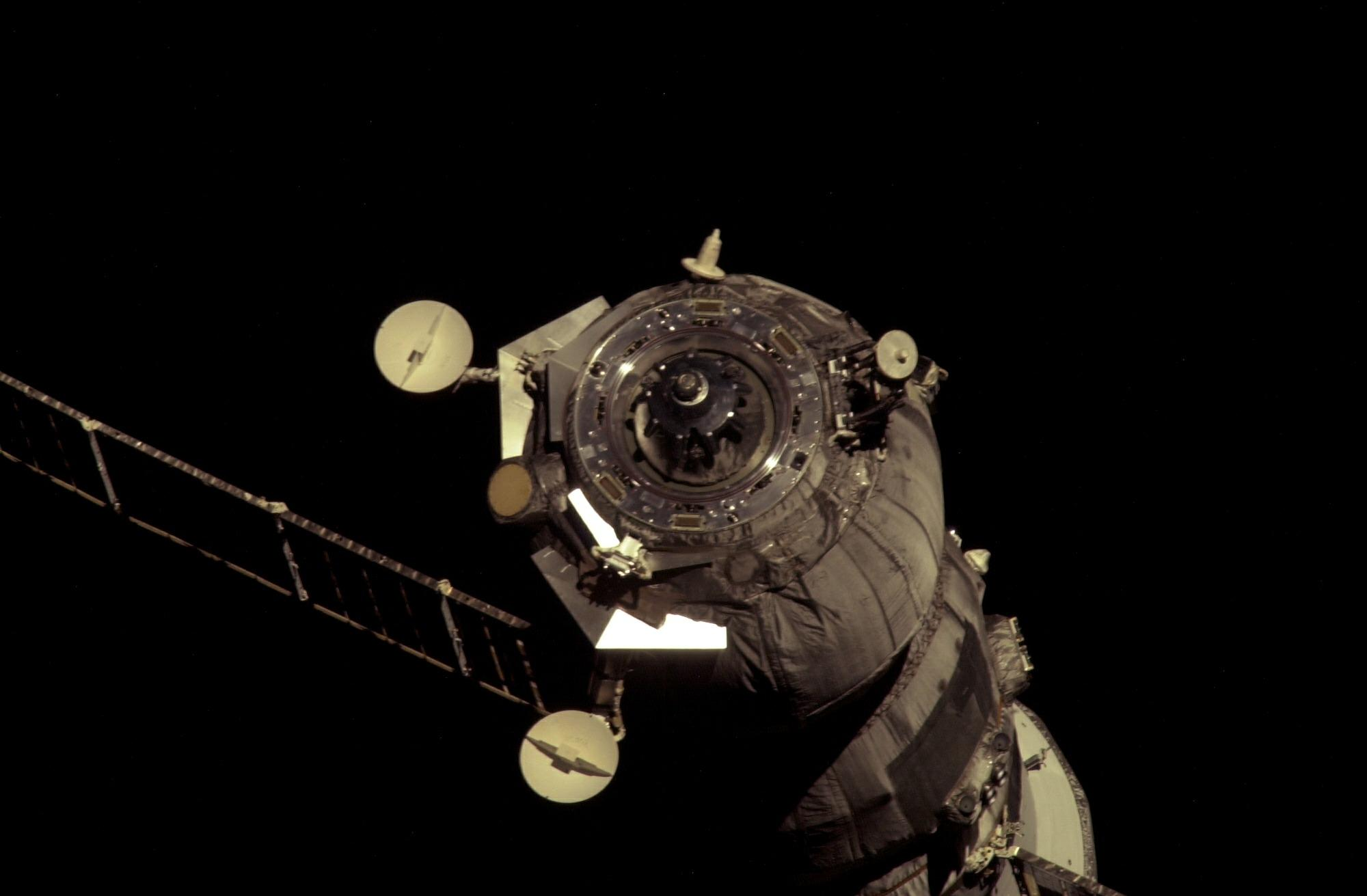
- Progress M-50 departing the ISS.
- Mission type: ISS resupply
- Operator: Roskosmos
- COSPAR ID: 2004-032A
- SATCAT no.: 28399
- Mission duration: 134 days

Spacecraft properties
- Spacecraft type: Progress-M s/n 350
- Manufacturer: RKK Energia

Start of mission
- Launch date: 11 August 2004, 05:03:07 UTC
- Rocket: Soyuz-U
- Launch site: Baikonur, Site 1/5

End of mission
- Disposal: Deorbited
- Decay date: 22 December 2004, 23:23:38 UTC

Orbital parameters
- Reference system: Geocentric
- Regime: Low Earth
- Perigee altitude: 352 km
- Apogee altitude: 363 km
- Inclination: 51.6°
- Period: 91.7 minutes
- Epoch: 11 August 2004

Docking with ISS
- Docking port: Zvezda aft
- Docking date: 14 August 2004, 05:01:08 UTC
- Undocking date: 22 December 2004, 19:37:02 UTC
- Time docked: 131 days

Cargo
- Mass: 2500 kg
- Progress ISS Resupply

Progress M-50 (Russian: Прогресс М-50), identified by NASA as Progress 15P, was a Progress spacecraft used to resupply the International Space Station. It was a Progress-M 11F615A55 spacecraft, with the serial number 350.

== Launch and docking ==
Progress M-50 was launched by a Soyuz-U carrier rocket from Site 1/5 at the Baikonur Cosmodrome. Launch occurred at 05:03:07 UTC on 11 August 2004. The spacecraft docked with the aft port of the Zvezda module at 05:01:08 UTC on 14 August 2004.

It remained docked for 131 days before undocking at 19:37:02 UTC on 22 December 2004. to make way for Progress M-51. It was deorbited at 22:32:06 UTC on 22 December 2004. The spacecraft burned up in the atmosphere over the Pacific Ocean, with any remaining debris landing in the ocean at around 23:23:38 UTC.

Progress M-50 carried supplies to the International Space Station, including food, water and oxygen for the crew and equipment for conducting scientific research.

== See also ==
- List of Progress flights
- Uncrewed spaceflights to the International Space Station
