= Progress M-04M =

Russian cargo spacecraft

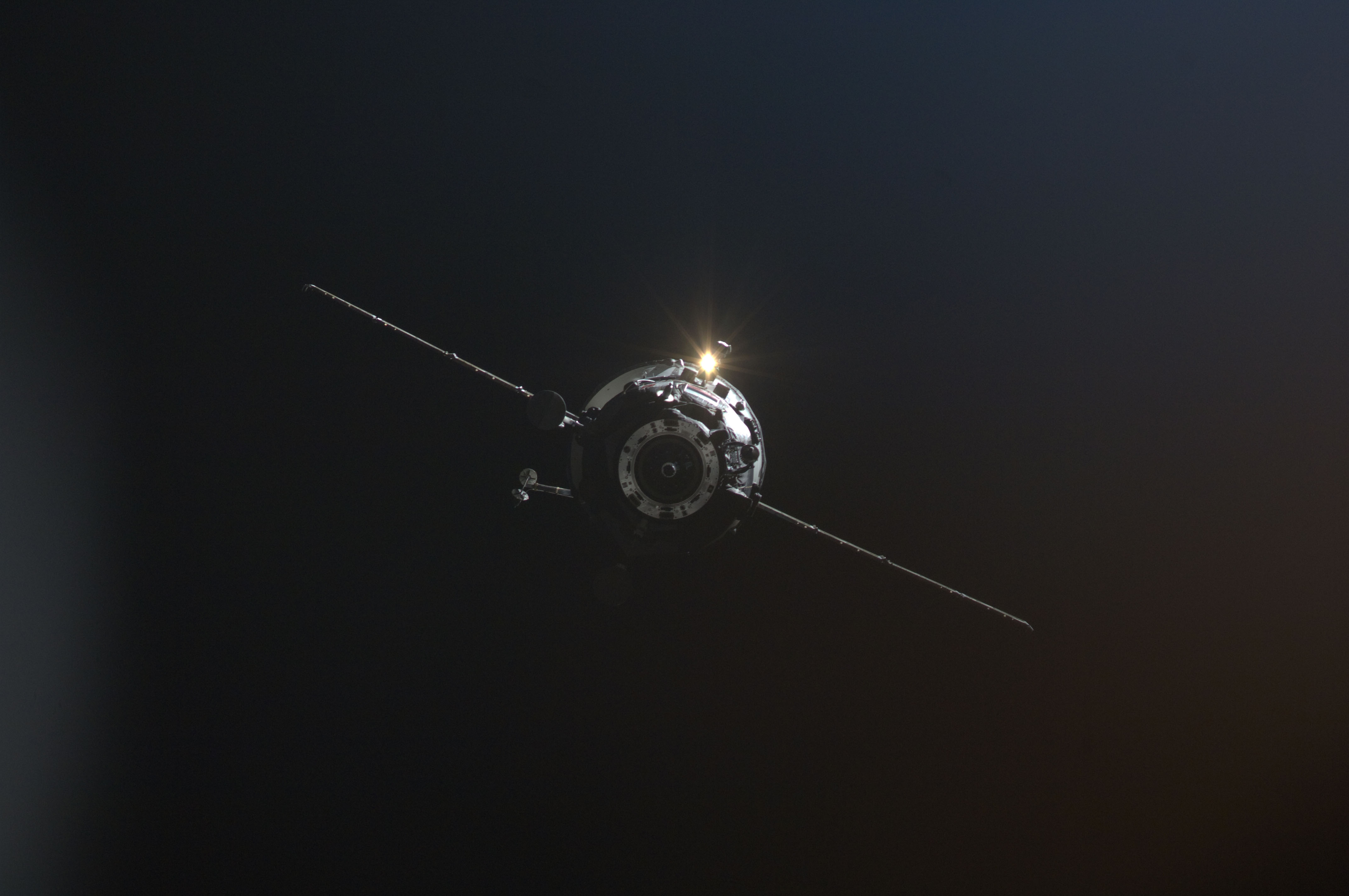
- Progress M-04M approaching the ISS.
- Mission type: ISS resupply
- Operator: Roskosmos
- COSPAR ID: 2010-003A
- SATCAT no.: 36361
- Mission duration: 148 days

Spacecraft properties
- Spacecraft type: Progress-M s/n 404
- Manufacturer: RKK Energia

Start of mission
- Launch date: 3 February 2010, 03:45 UTC
- Rocket: Soyuz-U
- Launch site: Baikonur, Site 1/5

End of mission
- Disposal: Deorbited
- Decay date: 1 July 2010

Orbital parameters
- Reference system: Geocentric
- Regime: Low Earth
- Inclination: 51.6°
- Epoch: 3 February 2010

Docking with ISS
- Docking port: Zvezda aft
- Docking date: 5 February 2010, 04:26 UTC
- Undocking date: 10 May 2010, 11:16 UTC
- Time docked: 94 days

Cargo
- Mass: 2686 kg
- Pressurised: 1217 kg
- Fuel: 880 kg
- Water: 420 kg
- Progress ISS Resupply

Progress M-04M (Russian: Прогресс М-04М), identified by NASA as Progress 36P, was a Russian Progress spacecraft launched in February 2010 to resupply the International Space Station. It was docked with the aft port of the Zvezda module of the station.

== Launch ==
Progress M-04M was launched by a Soyuz-U carrier rocket, flying from Site 1/5 at the Baikonur Cosmodrome. The launch occurred at 03:45 UTC on 3 February 2010.

== Docking ==
After just over three days of free flight, Progress M-04M docked with the Zvezda module of the International Space Station at 04:26 UTC on 5 February 2010. Its docking marked the first time four Russian spacecraft had been docked to the station at the same time, joining the Soyuz TMA-16, Soyuz TMA-17 and Progress M-03M spacecraft already docked. It remained docked until 10 May 2010, when it departed, allowing Soyuz TMA-17 to be moved to the Zvezda aft port to clear the way for the arrival of the Rassvet module, to be delivered by Space Shuttle Atlantis on STS-132 later that month.

== Cargo ==
The Progress M-04M spacecraft delivered 2,686 kilograms (5,922 lb) of cargo to the ISS. This included water to be used by systems in the Russian segment of the station, propellant to refuel the station and to perform orbital manoeuvres, food and medical supplies.

== Undocking ==
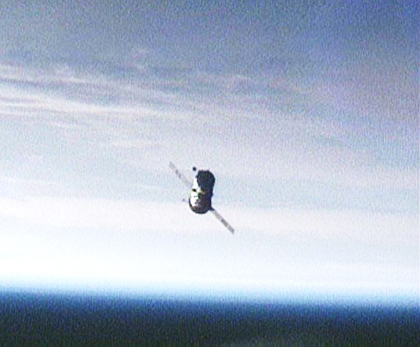
Progress M-04M seen shortly after undocking from the ISS.

Progress M-04M undocked from the ISS on 10 May 2010. On 7 May 2010, Russian Space Agency's Mission Control announced that the ISS crew had loaded Progress M-04M with garbage and readied the spacecraft for undocking. The command for undocking was issued at 11:13 UTC, and three minutes later Progress M-04M separated from the Zvezda module. Cosmonauts Aleksandr Skvortsov and Mikhail Kornienko monitored the undocking with photo and video cameras focusing on the Progress docking mechanism to confirm that there were no missing or damaged O-ring seals on the docking interface.

== Deorbited ==
The spacecraft stayed in autonomous flight for 60 days after undocking, taking part in the Reflection geophysical experiment to study reflective characteristics of the freighter's hull and the transparency of the Earth's atmosphere. Progress M-04M was deorbited on 1 July 2010 over the Pacific Ocean. The deorbit burn began at 13:54 UTC and at about 14:40, the remaining parts of the spacecraft which had not burnt during the reentry, fell down in the south area of the Pacific Ocean, 37°47′ South, and 235°09′ West.
