= Progress MS-26 =

2024 Russian resupply spaceflight to the ISS

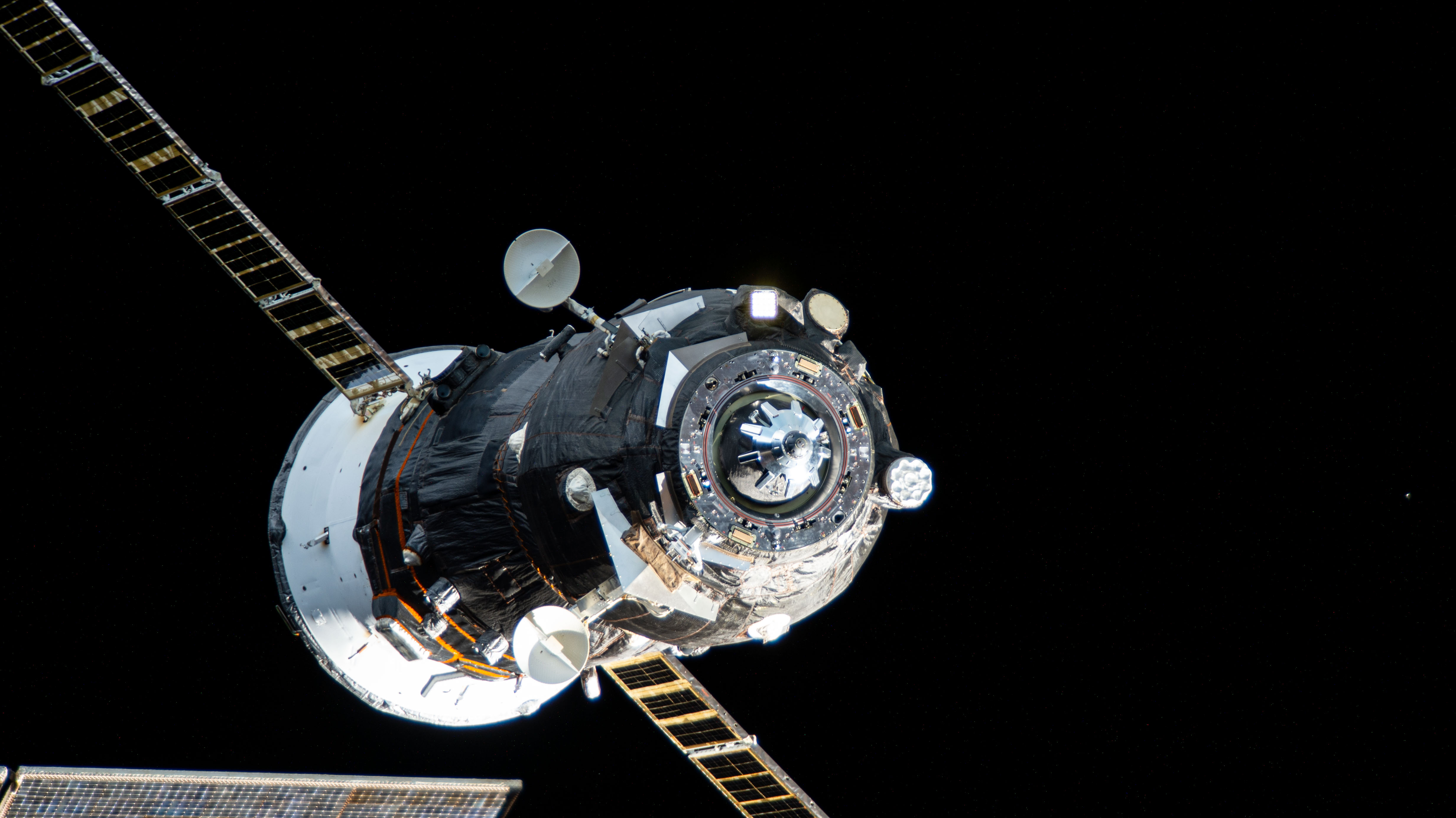
- Progress MS-26 departs the ISS
- Names: Progress 87; ISS 87P
- Mission type: ISS resupply
- Operator: Roscosmos
- COSPAR ID: 2024-029A
- SATCAT no.: 58961
- Mission duration: 180 days, 2 hours, 23 minutes

Spacecraft properties
- Spacecraft: Progress MS-26 No. 456
- Spacecraft type: Progress MS
- Manufacturer: Energia
- Launch mass: 7,427 kg (16,374 lb)
- Payload mass: 2,518 kg (5,551 lb)

Start of mission
- Launch date: 15 February 2024, 03:25:06 UTC
- Rocket: Soyuz-2.1a
- Launch site: Baikonur, Site 31/6
- Contractor: RKTs Progress

End of mission
- Disposal: Deorbited
- Decay date: 13 August 2024, 05:49 UTC

Orbital parameters
- Reference system: Geocentric orbit
- Regime: Low Earth orbit
- Inclination: 51.65°

Docking with ISS
- Docking port: Zvezda aft
- Docking date: 17 February 2024, 06:06:13 UTC
- Undocking date: 13 August 2024, 02:00:32 UTC
- Time docked: 177 days, 19 hours, 54 minutes

Cargo
- Mass: 2,518 kg (5,551 lb)
- Pressurised: 1,478 kg (3,258 lb)
- Fuel: 580 kg (1,280 lb)
- Gaseous: 620 kg (1,370 lb)
- Water: 420 kg (930 lb)

Progress MS-26 (Russian: Прогресс МC-26), Russian production No. 456, identified by NASA as Progress 87, is a Progress spaceflight launched by Roscosmos to resupply the International Space Station (ISS). It is the 179th flight of a Progress spacecraft.

== Launch ==
A Soyuz-2.1a rocket launched Progress MS-26 from Baikonur Site 31/6 on 15 February 2024 at 03:25 UTC. After a flight that took 2 days, 2 hours and 41 minutes, Progress MS-26 automatically docked with the aft port of the Zvezda module of the ISS on 17 February 2024 at 06:06 UTC.

== Manifest ==
Each Progress mission delivers over a thousand kilograms of supplies in its pressurized section, accessible to crewmembers. These supplies include consumables such as food, water, and air, along with equipment for maintenance and scientific research. In its unpressurized section, the spacecraft carries tanks of water, fuel, and gases to replenish the station’s resources and sustain its onboard atmosphere. These resources are transferred to the station through an automated process.

For this mission, Progress MS-28 was loaded with a total of 2,518 kg (5,551 lb) of cargo and supplies prior to launch. The cargo manifest includes the following:

- Pressurized supplies: 1,458 kg (3,214 lb)
- Fuel: 580 kg (1,280 lb)
- Oxygen gas: 580 kg (1,280 lb)
- Water: 420 kg (930 lb)
- Nitrogen gas: 40 kg (88 lb)

== See also ==
- Uncrewed spaceflights to the International Space Station
