= Zvezda (ISS module) =

Russian International Space Station module

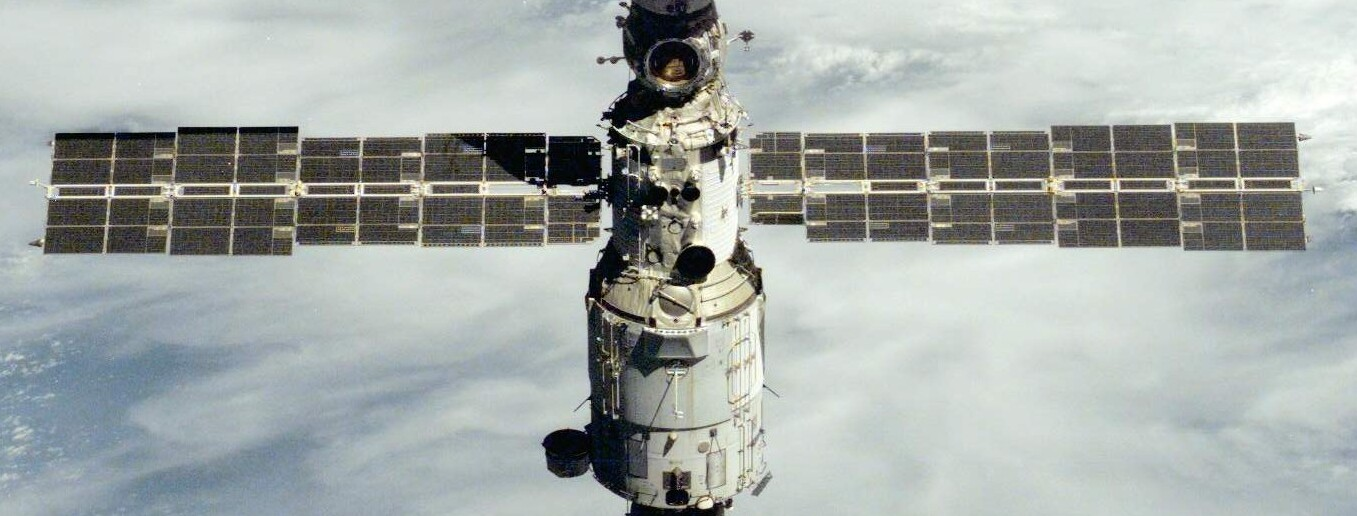
- Zvezda as seen by Space Shuttle Atlantis during STS-106

Module statistics
- COSPAR ID: 2000-037A
- Part of: International Space Station
- Launch date: 12 July 2000, 04:56 UTC
- Launch vehicle: Proton-K
- Docked: 26 July 2000, 01:45 UTC (Zarya aft)
- Mass: 20,320 kg (44,800 lb)
- Length: 13.1 m (43 ft)
- Width: 29.7 m (97 ft)
- Diameter: 4.35 m (14.3 ft)
- Pressurised volume: 75 m^{3} (2,600 cu ft); Habitable: 46.7 m^{3} (1,650 cu ft)

Configuration
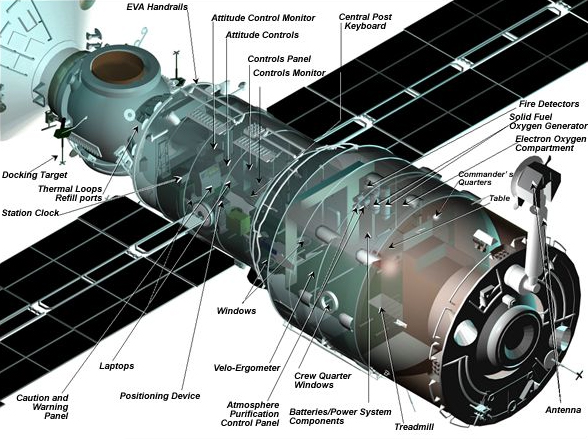
- On-orbit configuration of the Zvezda service module

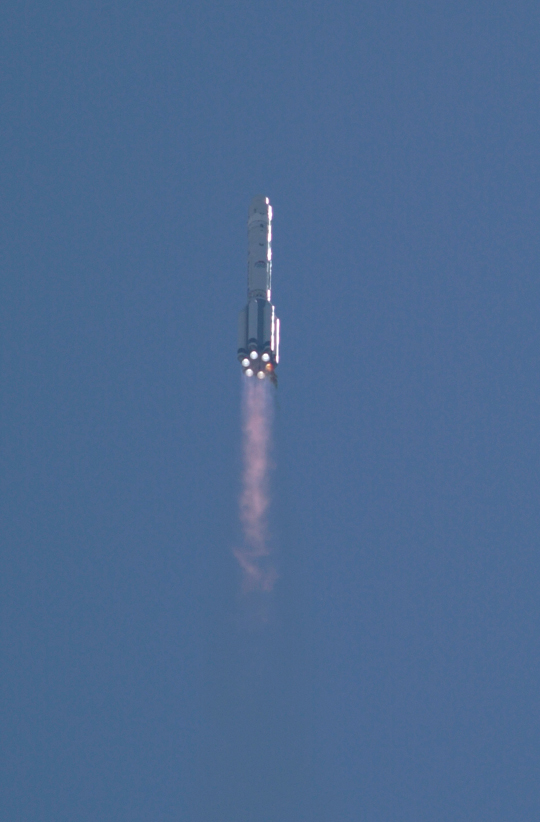
Zvezda heads into orbit aboard a Proton launch vehicle on 12 July 2000.

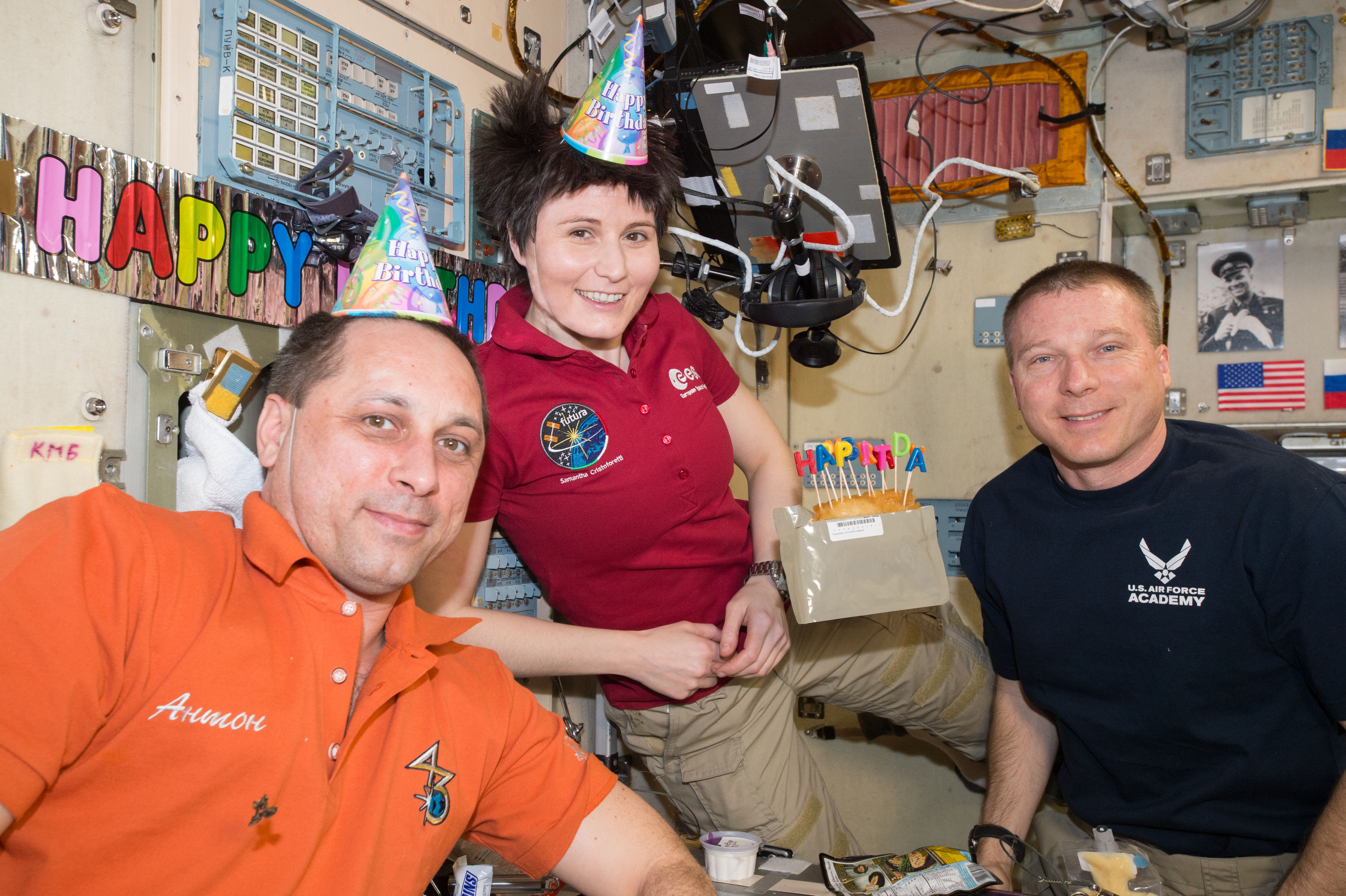
Expedition 43 crew celebrate a birthday in Zvezda module, 2015.

Zvezda, (Russian: Звезда, lit. 'star') also known as the Zvezda Service Module, is a module of the International Space Station (ISS). It was the third module launched to the station, and provided all of the station's life support systems, some of which are supplemented in the US Orbital Segment (USOS), as well as living quarters for two crew members. It is the structural and functional center of the Russian Orbital Segment (ROS), which is the Russian part of the ISS. Crew assemble here to deal with emergencies on the station.

The module was manufactured in the USSR by Energia, with major sub-contracting work by GKNPTs Khrunichev. Zvezda was launched on a Proton launch vehicle on 12 July 2000, and docked with the Zarya module on 26 July 2000 at 01:45 UTC.

== Origins ==
The hull of Zvezda, known as "DOS-8", was initially built in the mid-1980s as a structural spare of the Mir core module (DOS-7) and later reconfigured as the core module of the Mir-2 station. Its design is a continuation of the civilian Salyut programme's DOS (Durable Orbital Station) lineage.

DOS-7 and DOS-8 were developed after the Soviet government approved the plan to create a next-generation space station with multiple docking ports in 1976. Following the tradition in the Salyut programme, two identical modules were built to ensure a spare in case the primary article was lost during launch or due to a failure in orbit. After the design documentation was completed in 1982, manufacturing began on the twin modules at KB Salyut's Khrunichev factory.

The DOS-8 pressure vessel was completed in February 1985 after which work slowed significantly until the launch of DOS-7 as the Mir core module in February 1986. Major internal equipment was installed by October 1986.

Following the successful launch of DOS-7, DOS-8 became the core element of a proposed successor to Mir, internally known as GK-180, which utilised 100-tonne modules launched on the Energia and a large truss structure. The design was announced to the media as Mir-2 in January 1988 and officially approved in December 1989, though by 1991 significant delays and funding cuts caused the project to be abandoned.

After considering the option to replace the Mir core module in orbit with the DOS-8 article and deliver new add-on modules aboard Buran, by 1992 the choice fell on launching DOS-8 as the core of a new, streamlined Mir-2 station. The new configuration featured a truss braced against the core module's working compartment and a number of small expansion modules. Photovoltaic panels and solar concentrators would be attached to the truss, together with radiators, orientation thrusters, gyrodines and science experiments.

In 1993, the Mir-2 complex was redesigned once more, with the truss structure transitioning from a Sofora-like design assembled by the cosmonauts in orbit to one using preintegrated truss segments, and two Universal Docking Modules added to the station. Soon after, the Mir-2 station was merged with Space Station Freedom to form the International Space Station, on which DOS-8 serves as the Service Module.

== Design ==
Zvezda consists of three pressurised compartments and one unpressurised compartment. From forward to aft, the pressurised compartments are: a spherical transfer compartment, a long cylindrical main working compartment, and a short cylindrical transfer tunnel. The unpressurised assembly compartment wraps around the exterior of the transfer tunnel. Zvezda weighs about 19,050 kg (42,000 lb) and has a length of 13.1 m (43 ft). The solar panels extend 29.7 m (97 ft).

The transfer compartment (Russian: Переходный Отсек, ПхО, romanized: Perekhodniy Otsek, PKhO) has three docking ports, along with an internal hatch that can seal it off from the rest of the module, allowing it to serve as an airlock. When Zvezda was launched, its forward port docked to the aft port of the Zarya module already in orbit. The nadir (Earth-facing) port was initially intended to be used by the Universal Docking Module, it would instead be used by the Pirs module from 2001 to 2021 and the Nauka module since 2021. The zenith (space-facing) port was initially intended to be used by the Science Power Platform, it would instead be used by the Poisk module since 2009. The transfer compartment's airlock functionality was only used once during Expedition 2, when Yury Usachov and James Voss put a docking cone on the nadir port to prepare for the arrival of the Pirs module.

The working compartment (Russian: Рабочий Отсек, РО, romanized: Rabochii Otsek, RO) is where the crews work and live and makes up the bulk of the module's volume. It comprises two cylinders joined together by a conical adapter. The forward, small-diameter instrument compartment (Russian: Приборой Отсек, ПО, romanized: Priboroi Otsek, PO) contains the station command post (central computer) and related equipment, The aft large-diameter habitable compartment (Russian: Жилой Отсек, ЖО, romanized: Zhloi Otsek, ZhO) contains two sleeping quarters, a NASA-provided Treadmill with Vibration Isolation Stabilization, a kitchen equipped with a refrigerator/freezer and a table, a bicycle for exercise, a toilet and other hygiene facilities, this section also contained the Elektron system that electrolyzes condensed humidity and waste water to provide up to 5.13 kilograms (11.3 lb) per day of oxygen for breathing, while hydrogen is expelled into space. The system also creates condensed water that could be used for drinking in an emergency, but ordinarily fresh water from Earth was used.

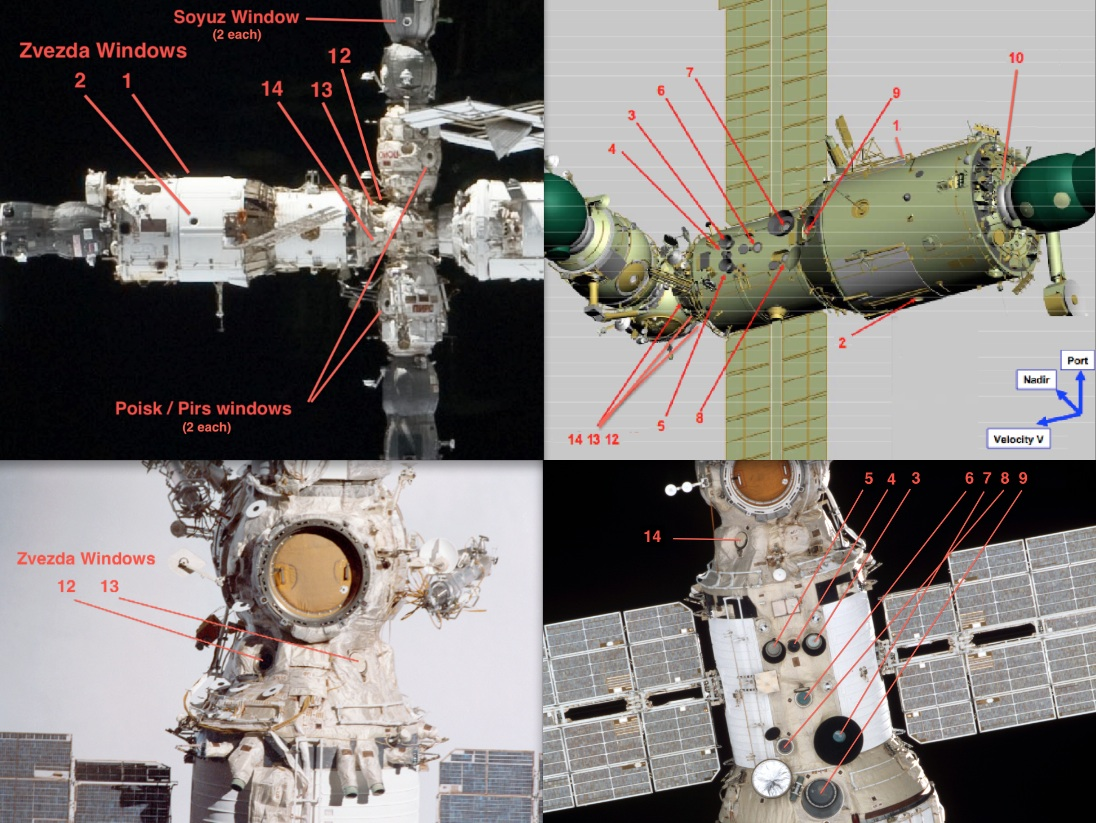
Russian Orbital Segment windows

Zvezda has 13 windows. There are two 22.5 cm (8.9 in) diameter windows, one in each of the two crew sleep compartments (windows No. 1 and 2), six 22.5 cm (8.9 in) diameter windows (No. 3, 4, 5, 6, 7 and 8) on the forward Transfer Compartment earth-facing floor, a 40 cm (16 in) diameter window in the main Working Compartment (No. 9), and one 7.5 cm (3.0 in) diameter window in the aft transfer compartment (No. 10). There are a further three 22.5 cm (8.9 in) diameter windows in the forward end of the forward transfer compartment (No. 12, 13 and 14), for observing approaching craft. Designers did not include installation of Window No. 11.

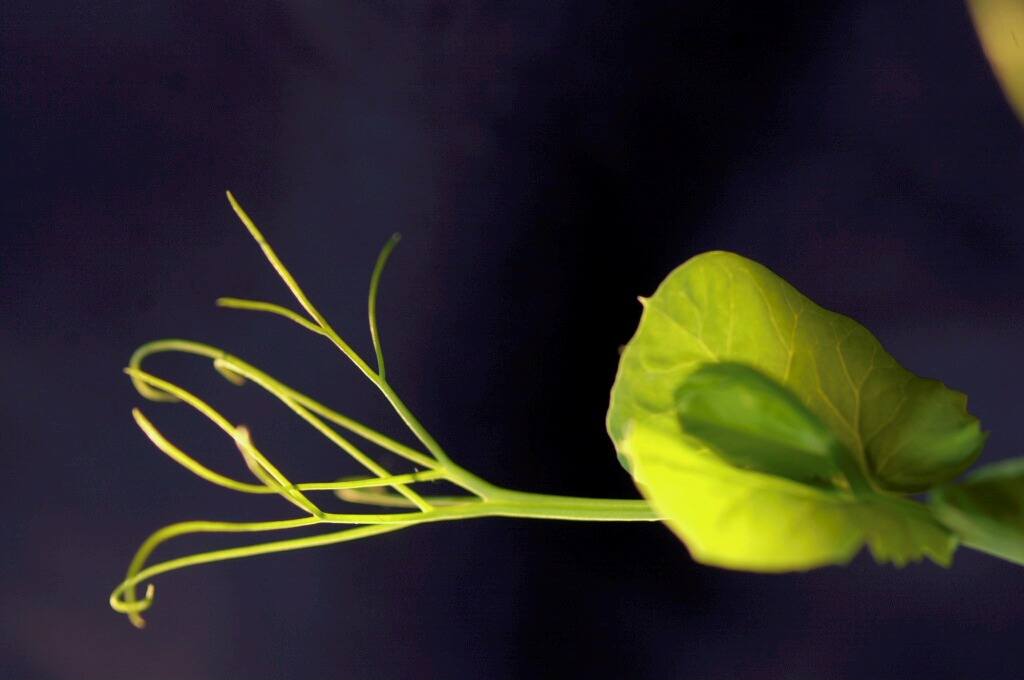
Sprouts in the BIO-5 Rasteniya-2/Lada-2 (Plants-2) experiment aboard Zvezda

Zvezda is also the home of the Lada Greenhouse, which is a test for growing plants in space.

The "Assembly Compartment" holds external equipment such as thrusters, thermometers, antennas, and propellant tanks. The large movable "Lira satellite communications antenna" is located on the Zvezda service module near the aft or rear of the International Space Station on this Assembly Compartment. The "Transfer Chamber" is equipped with automatic docking equipment and is used to service Soyuz and Progress spacecraft.

The Service Module has 16 small thrusters as well as two large 3,070-newton (690 lb_{f}) S5.79 thrusters that are 2-axis mounted and can be gimballed 5°. The thrusters are pressure-fed from four tanks with a total capacity of 860 kg. The oxidizer used for the propulsion system is dinitrogen tetroxide and the fuel is UDMH, the supply tanks being pressurised with nitrogen. The two main engines on Zvezda can be used to raise the station's altitude. This was done on 25 April 2007. This was the first time the engines had been fired since Zvezda arrived in 2000.

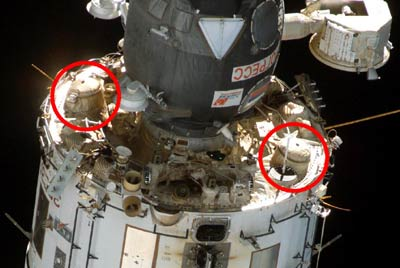
The two large thruster units of Zvezda circled

Elektron proved to be rather noisy for the crew and significant maintenance work, having failed several times and requiring the crew to use the Solid Fuel Oxygen Generator canisters (also called "oxygen candles", which were the cause of a fire on Mir) when it has been broken for extended amounts of time. It also contains the Vozdukh, a system which removes carbon dioxide from the air based on the use of regenerable absorbers of carbon dioxide gas.

The Zvezda module inherited a limitation from its predecessor Mir and Salyut stations rooted in a Soviet spacecraft design philosophy favoring the permanent installation of critical hardware. This approach, while providing more internal living space by concealing systems behind closed panels, contrasts with the US Orbital Segment's (USOS) strategy of using easily replaceable 41.3-inch-wide (105 cm) International Standard Payload Racks. USOS modules, connected via the Common Berthing Mechanism (CBM), have 51-inch-wide (130 cm) hatches that accommodate the movement of these racks between modules and spacecraft. Consequently, broken or unfixable hardware on Zvezda remains permanently in place. A notable example is the pre-installed Elektron oxygen-generating system, which required frequent repairs by cosmonauts due to the inability to replace it. Zvezda's 78.74-centimetre-wide (31.00 in) hatch and the lack of available replacement Elektron units hindered the replacement process. The discontinuation of Elektron production further exacerbated this issue. In October 2020, the Elektron system malfunctioned again, leading to its deactivation.

== Connection to the ISS ==
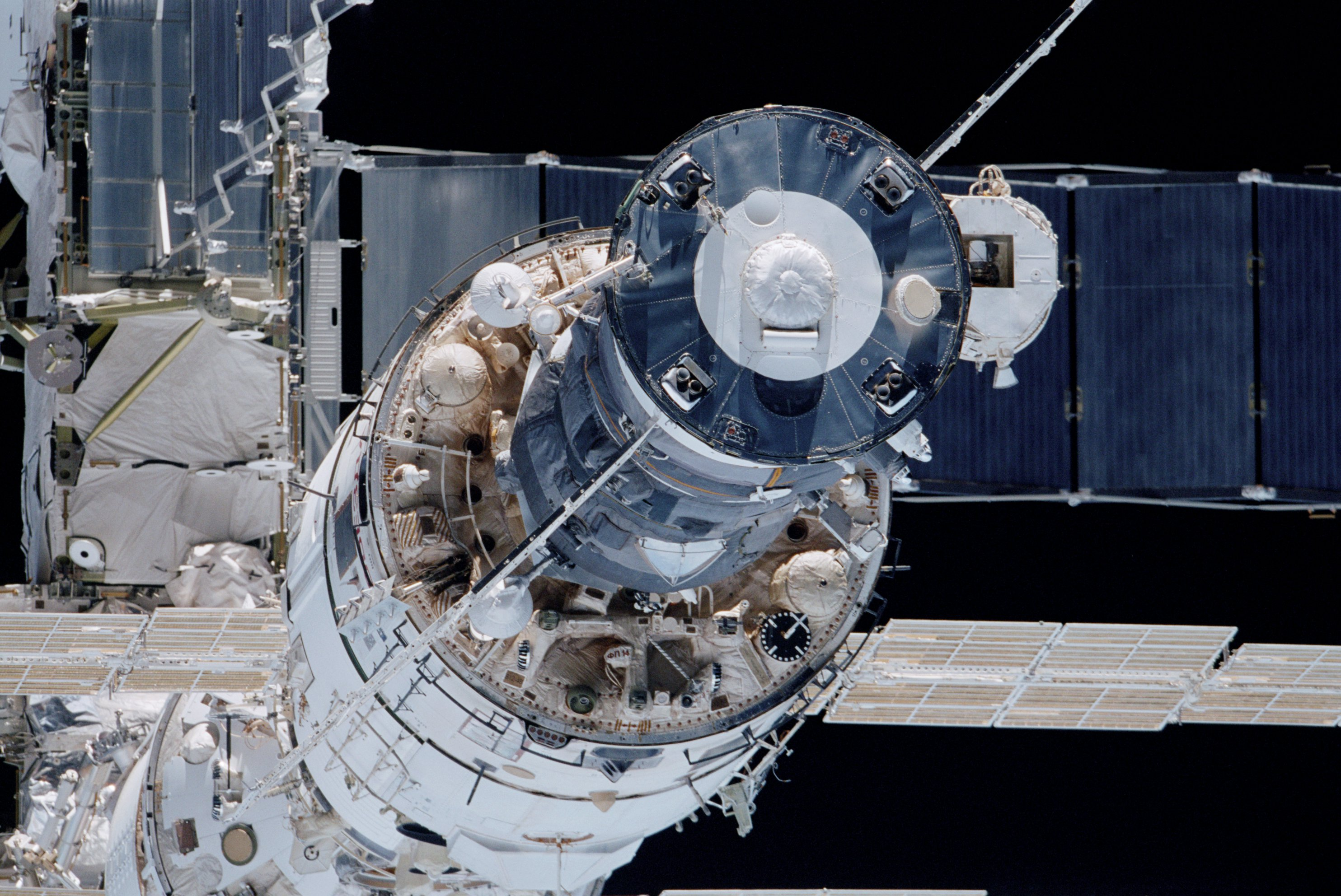
Progress docked to Zvezda (aft view)

The rocket used for launch to the ISS carried advertising; it was emblazoned with the logo of Pizza Hut restaurants, for which they are reported to have paid more than US$1 million. The money helped support Khrunichev State Research and Production Space Center and the Russian advertising agencies that orchestrated the event.

Management and integration of the Service Module into the International Space Station began in 1991. Structural construction was performed by RKK Energia, then handed over to the Khrunichev Design Bureau for final outfitting. Joint reviews between the Russian Space Agency (Roscosmos) and the NASA ISS Program Office monitored construction, solved language and security concerns and ensured flight readiness and crew training. Several years of delay were encountered due to funding constraints between Roscosmos and RKK Energia requiring repeated delays in First Element Launch.

On 26 July 2000, Zvezda became the third component of the ISS when it docked at the aft port of Zarya. (The U.S. Unity module had already been attached to Zarya). Later in July, the computers aboard Zarya handed over ISS commanding functions to computers on Zvezda.

On 11 September 2000, two members of the STS-106 Space Shuttle crew completed final connections between Zvezda and Zarya; during a 6-hour, 14 minute EVA, astronaut Ed Lu and cosmonaut Yuri Malenchenko connected nine cables between Zvezda and Zarya, including four power cables, four video and data cables and a fiber-optic telemetry cable. The next day, STS-106 crew members floated into Zvezda for the first time, at 05:20 UTC on 12 September 2000.

Zvezda provided early living quarters, a life support system, a communication system (Zvezda introduced a 10 Mbit/s Ethernet network to the ISS), electrical power distribution, a data processing system, a flight control system, and a propulsion system. These quarters and some, but not all, systems have since been supplemented by additional ISS components.

== Launch risks ==
Due to Russian financial problems, Zvezda was launched with no backup and no insurance. Due to this risk, NASA had constructed an Interim Control Module (ICM) in case it was delayed significantly or destroyed on launch.

== Air leaks ==
Since September 2019, the Zvezda module has been experiencing a worsening air leak. The source appears to be microscopic structural cracks within the small transfer tunnel, known by the Russian acronym PrK, which connects Zvezda to the aft docking port typically used by Progress cargo spacecraft. Initially, the leak rate was minimal, less than 1 pound (0.45 kg) per day, but it has steadily increased, reaching 3.7 pounds (1.7 kg) per day as of April 2024. While both NASA and Roscosmos suspect issues with welds, the exact cause of the leak remains unknown. NASA has classified the leaks as a high-risk threat to spaceflight activities, potentially leading to "catastrophic failure." However, Roscosmos says that it does not believe a catastrophic disintegration of the PrK is realistic, and has expressed confidence in their ability to monitor and manage the leak.

As of November 2024, to mitigate the leak and the risk of a catastrophic failure, the normal operating procedure was to keep the hatch leading to the PrK from Zvezda closed except when a spacecraft was being actively accessed. When the hatch leading to the PrK is opened, a hatch leading to the US Orbital Segment of the ISS is closed, which would contain a catastrophic failure and decompression to just the Russian Orbital Segment.

On 5 June 2026, five of the seven crew members aboard the ISS were told by NASA to take shelter inside the docked SpaceX Crew Dragon Freedom spacecraft as the remaining two cosmonauts, ISS commander Sergey Kud-Sverchkov and flight engineer Sergei Mikayev, attempted to repair a "worsening air leak" on the PrK. NASA allowed the astronauts to return to the ISS shortly after Roscosmos paused structural repair efforts, pending further measurements and data. On 15 June, it was reported that Roscosmos had decided to decommission the PrK module, removing any further risk of a rapid depressurization event.

== Interior ==
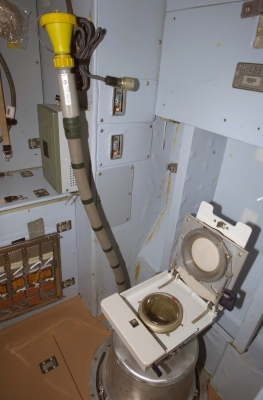
Zvezda's space toilet

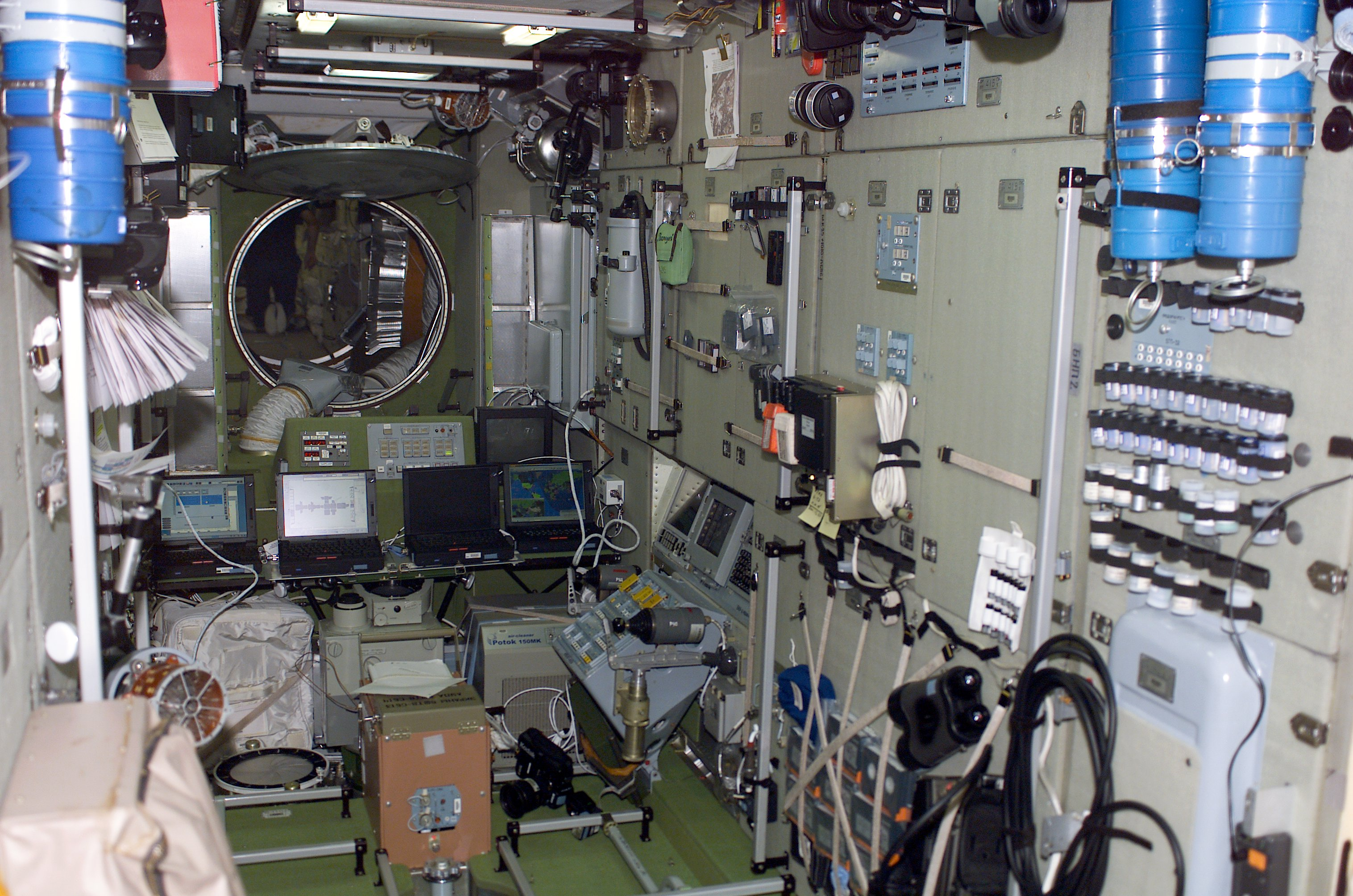
Forward view of interior of Zvezda

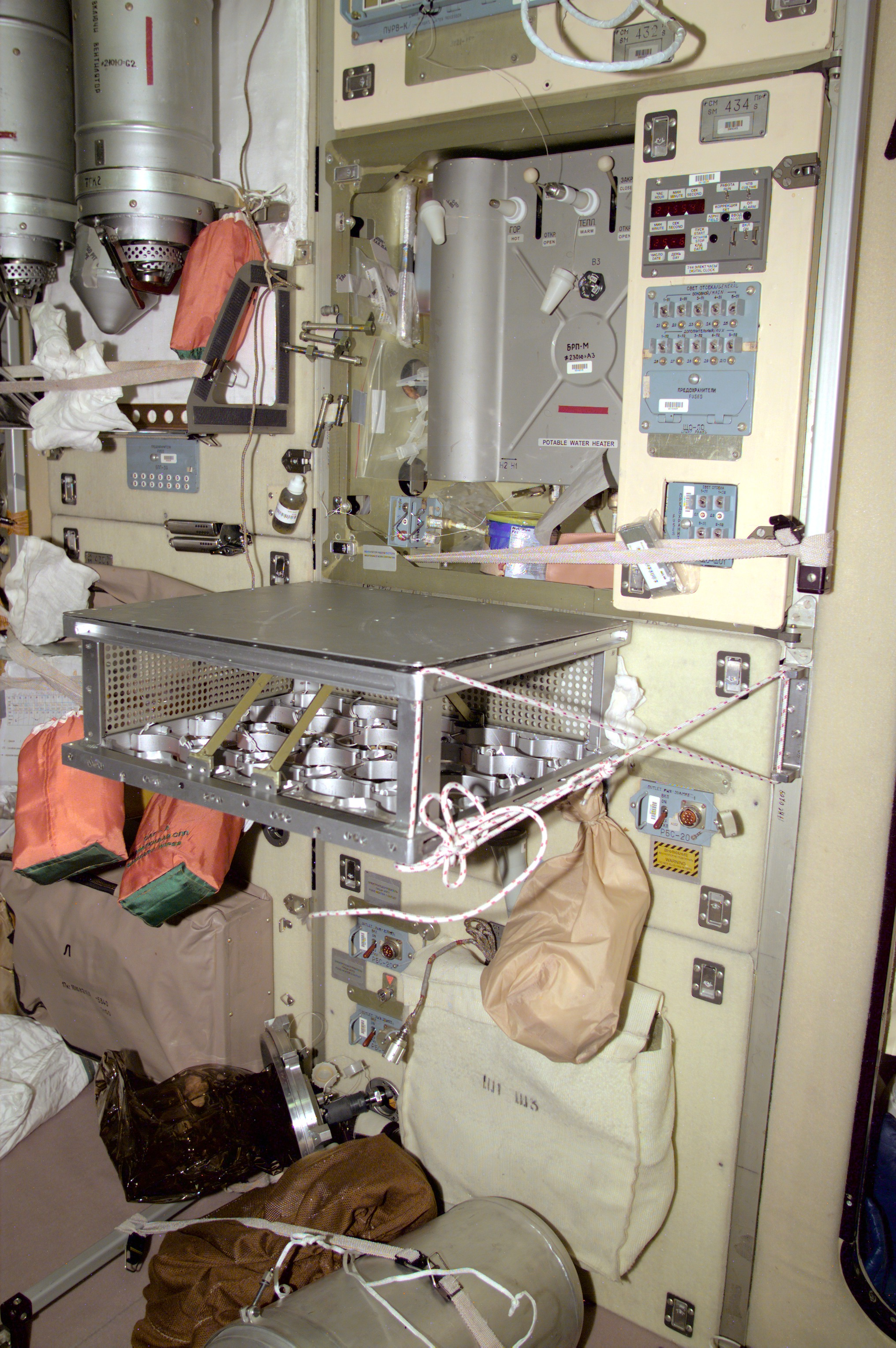
Part of the galley

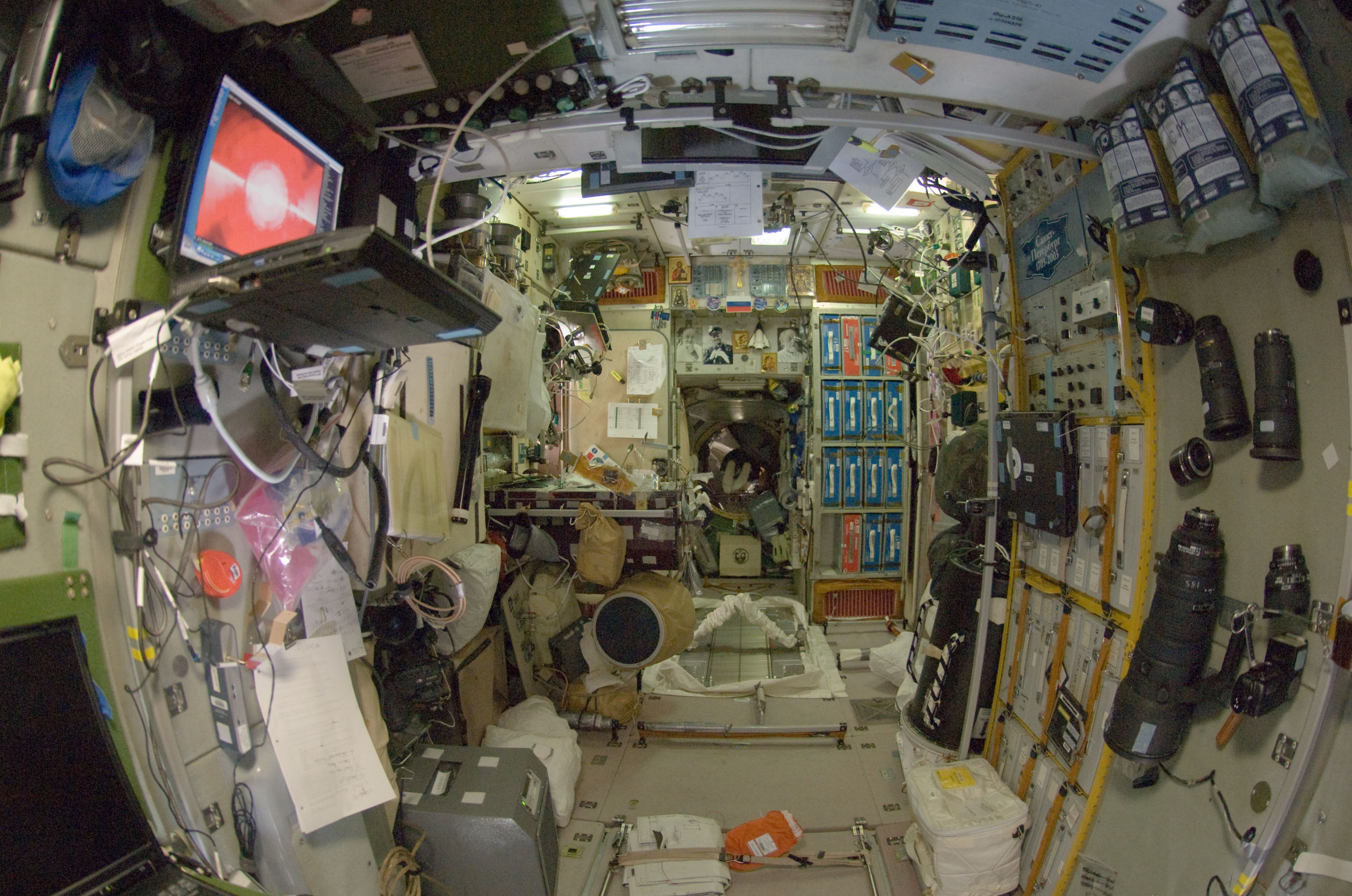
Zvezda aft. Items in the image include a crucifix, three icons, a telephoto camera lens, a camera flash, a zoom camera lens, other camera lenses, laptop computers with music playback software, a picture of Konstantin Tsiolkovsky, external speakers for a laptop computer, a picture of Yuri Gagarin, a Russian flag, a spaceplane model, a picture of Saint Petersburg, a fluorescent light fitting, several crew patches, and an oscillimeter (combined oscilloscope and multimeter).

== Crew ==
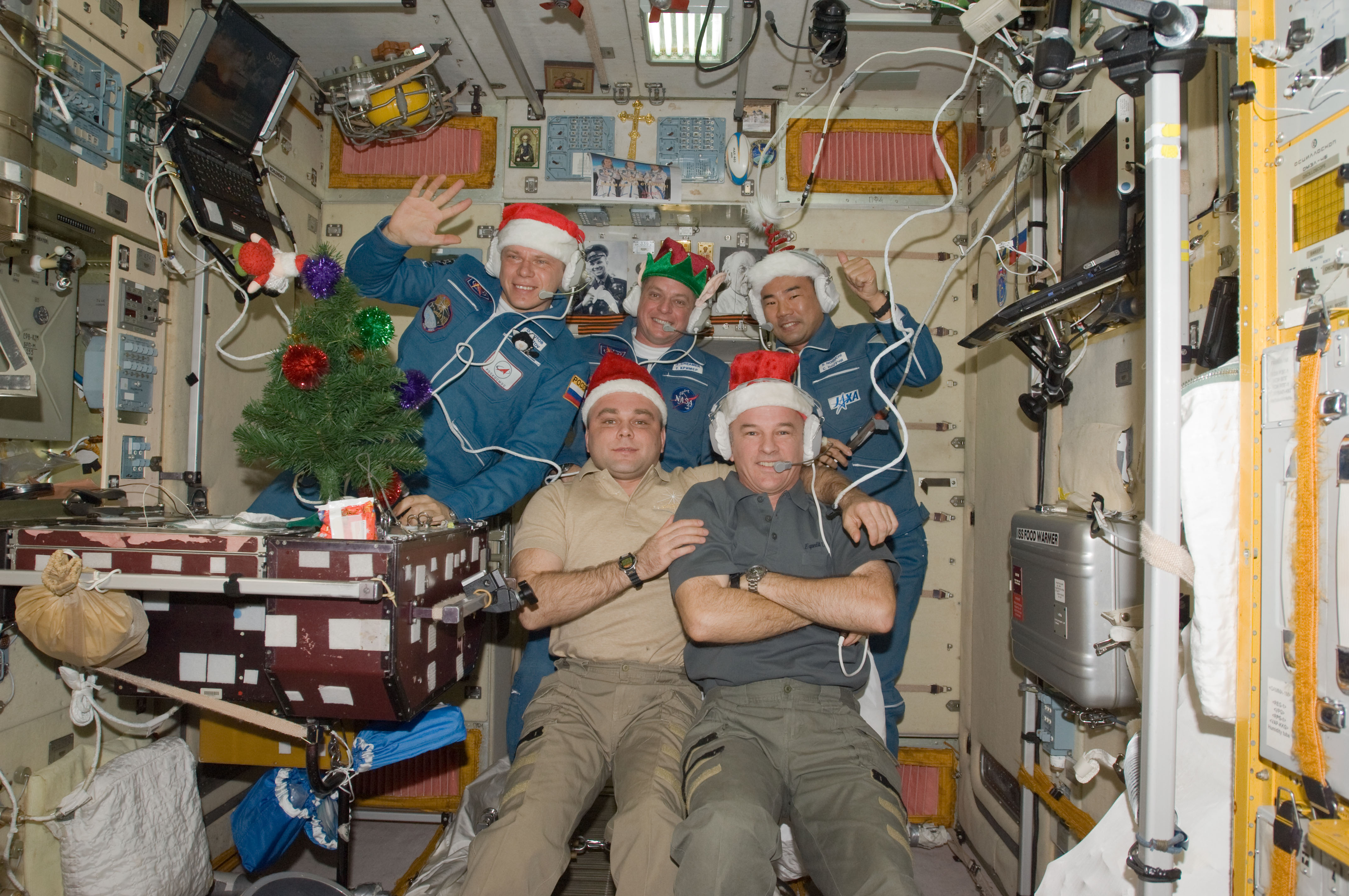
Crewmembers celebrating Christmas in Zvezda

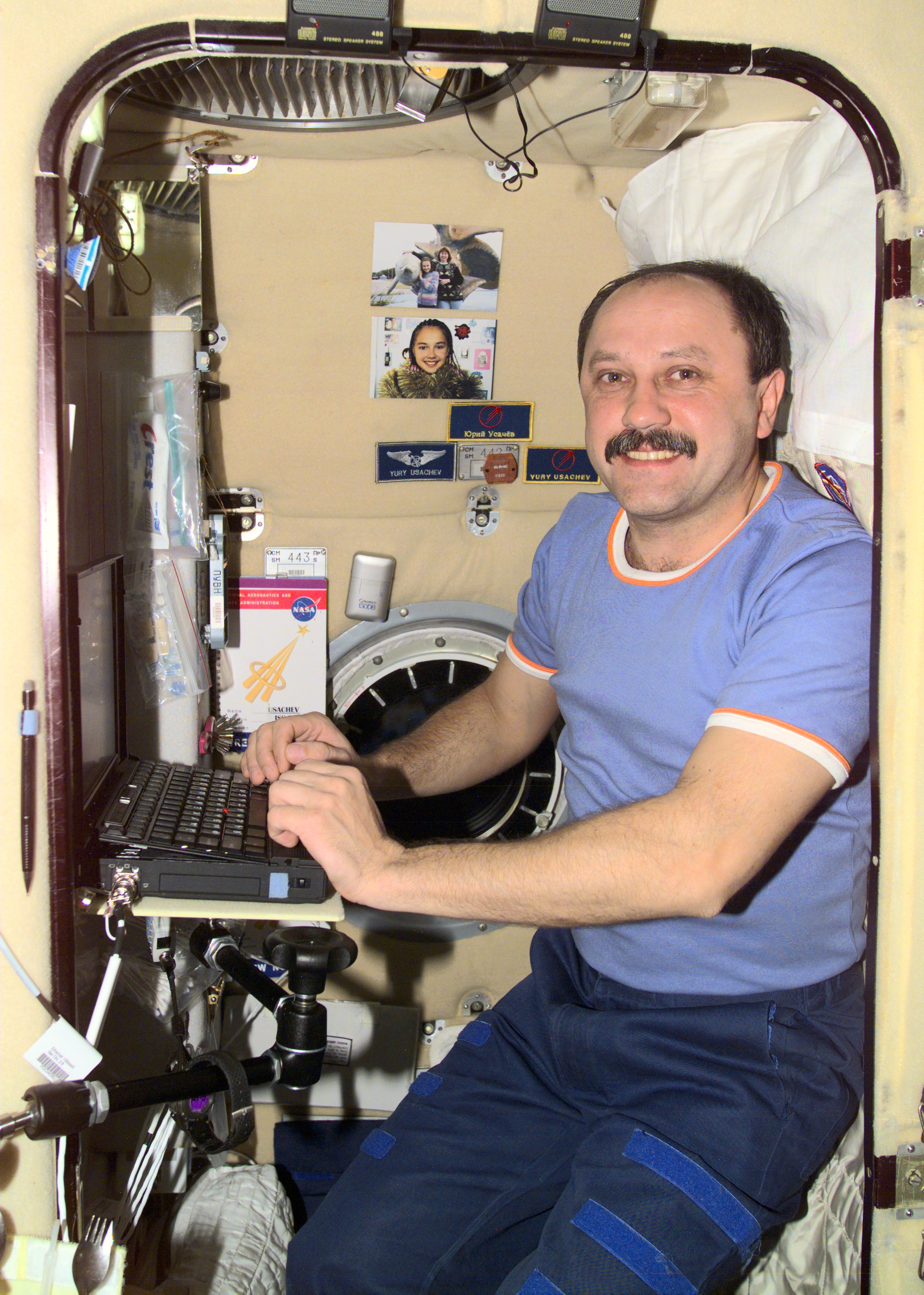
View of one of the Zvezda crew quarters

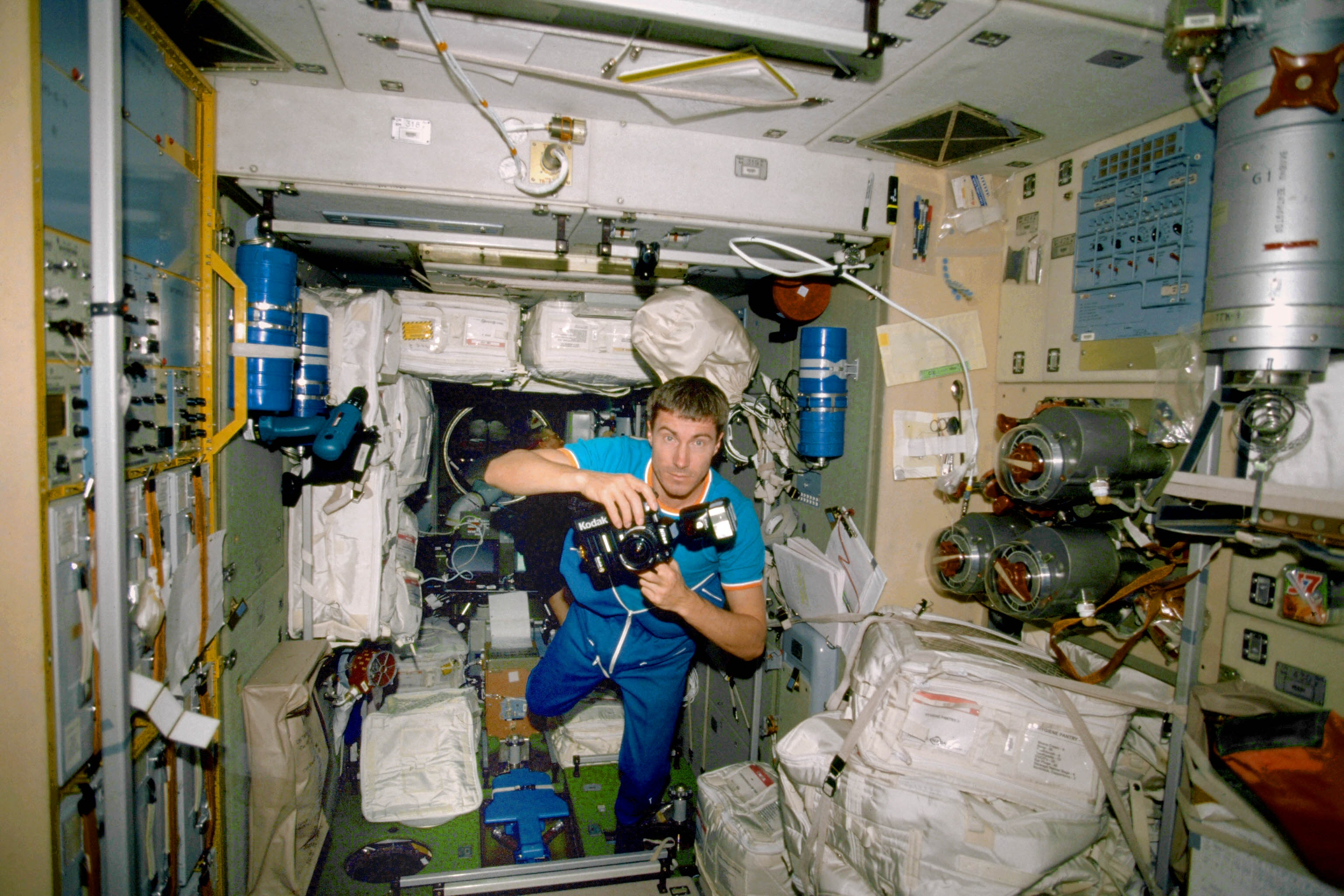
Cosmonaut in Zvezda, November 2000.

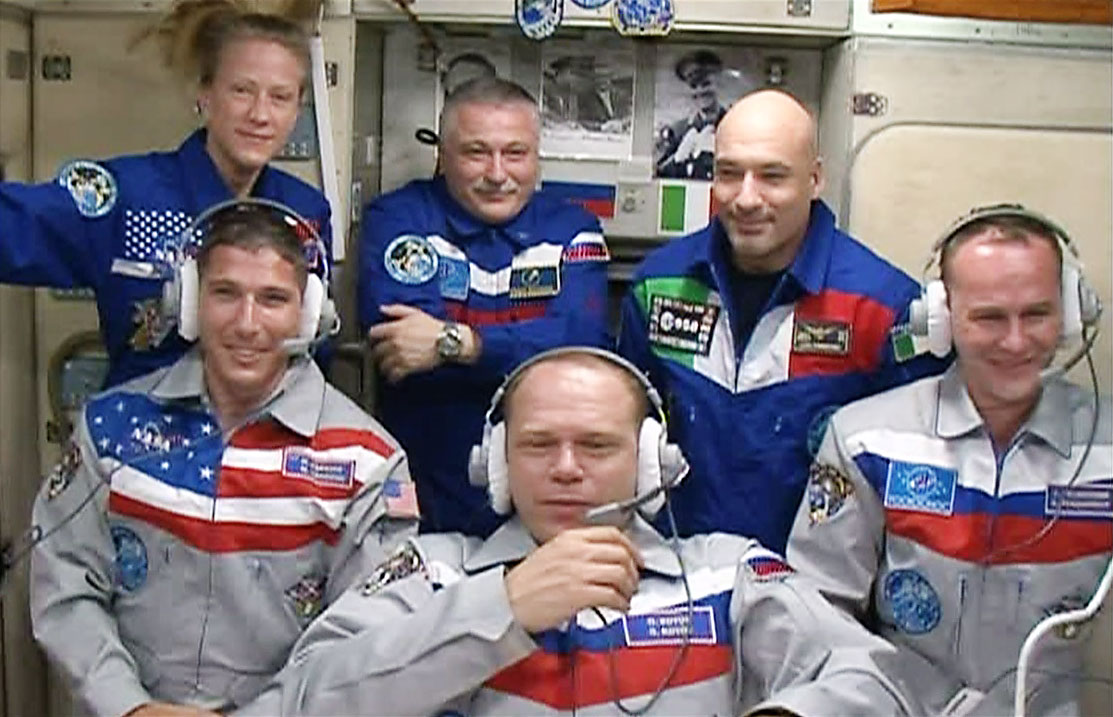
Expedition 37 crew in Zvezda

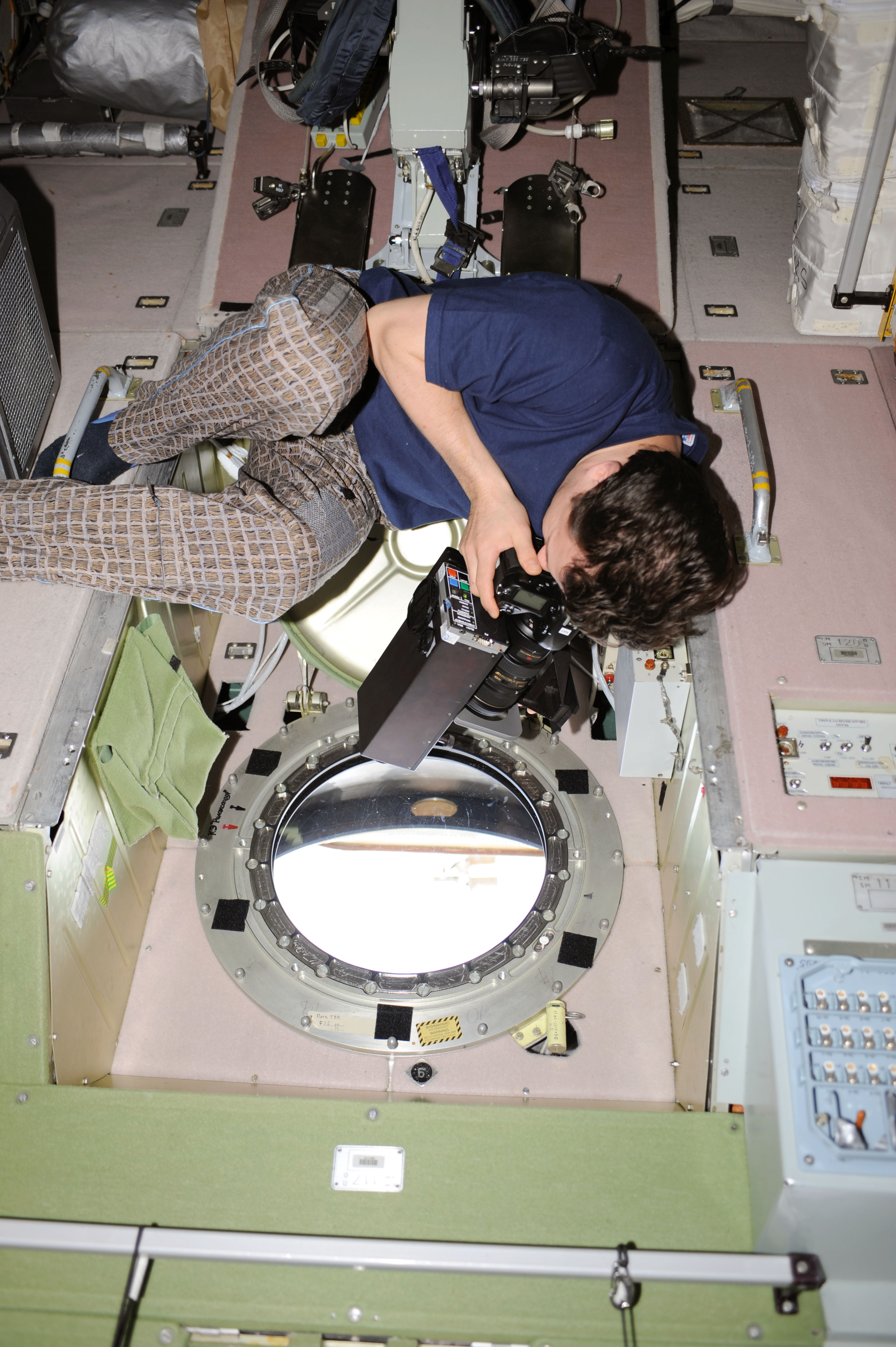
Roman Romanenko at a window in Zvezda

== Exterior ==
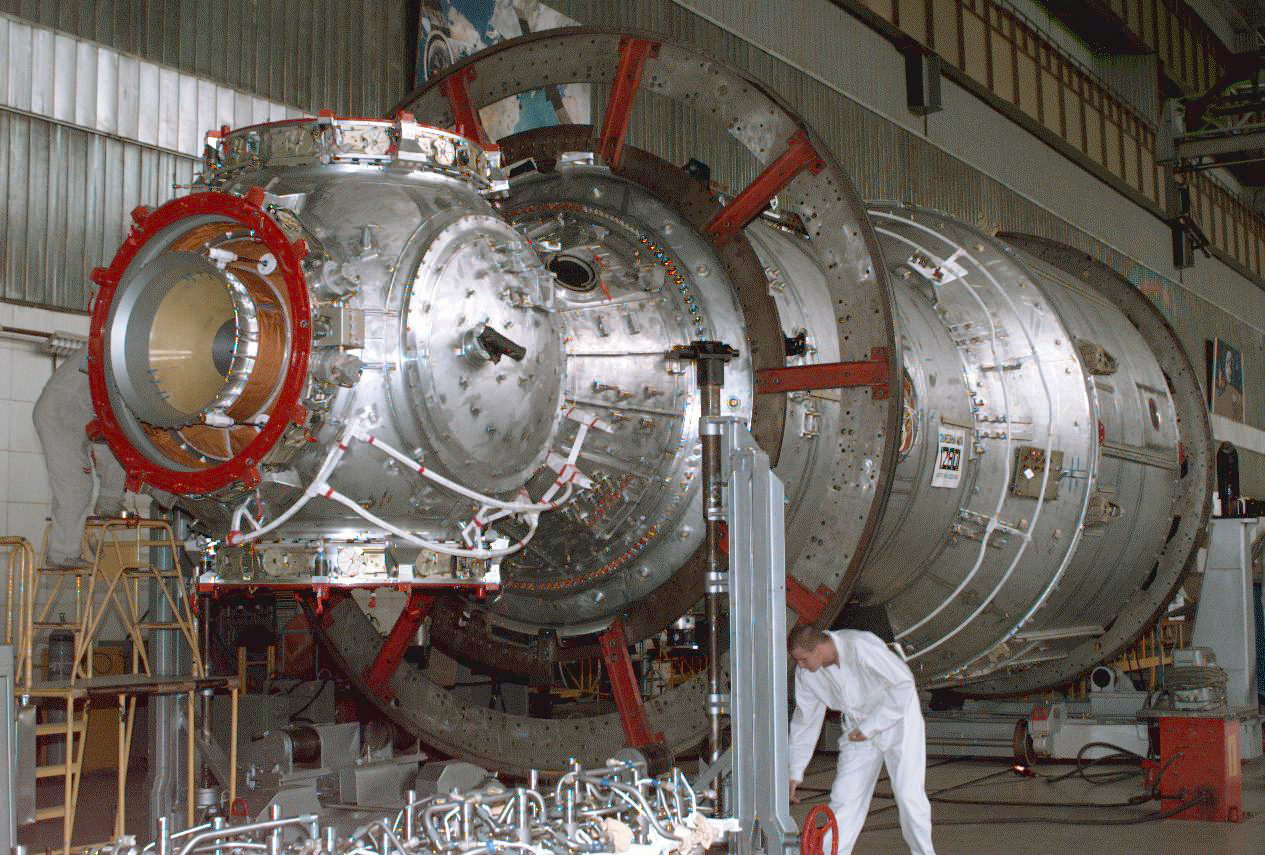
Zvezda Service Module being manufactured at the Khrunichev factory

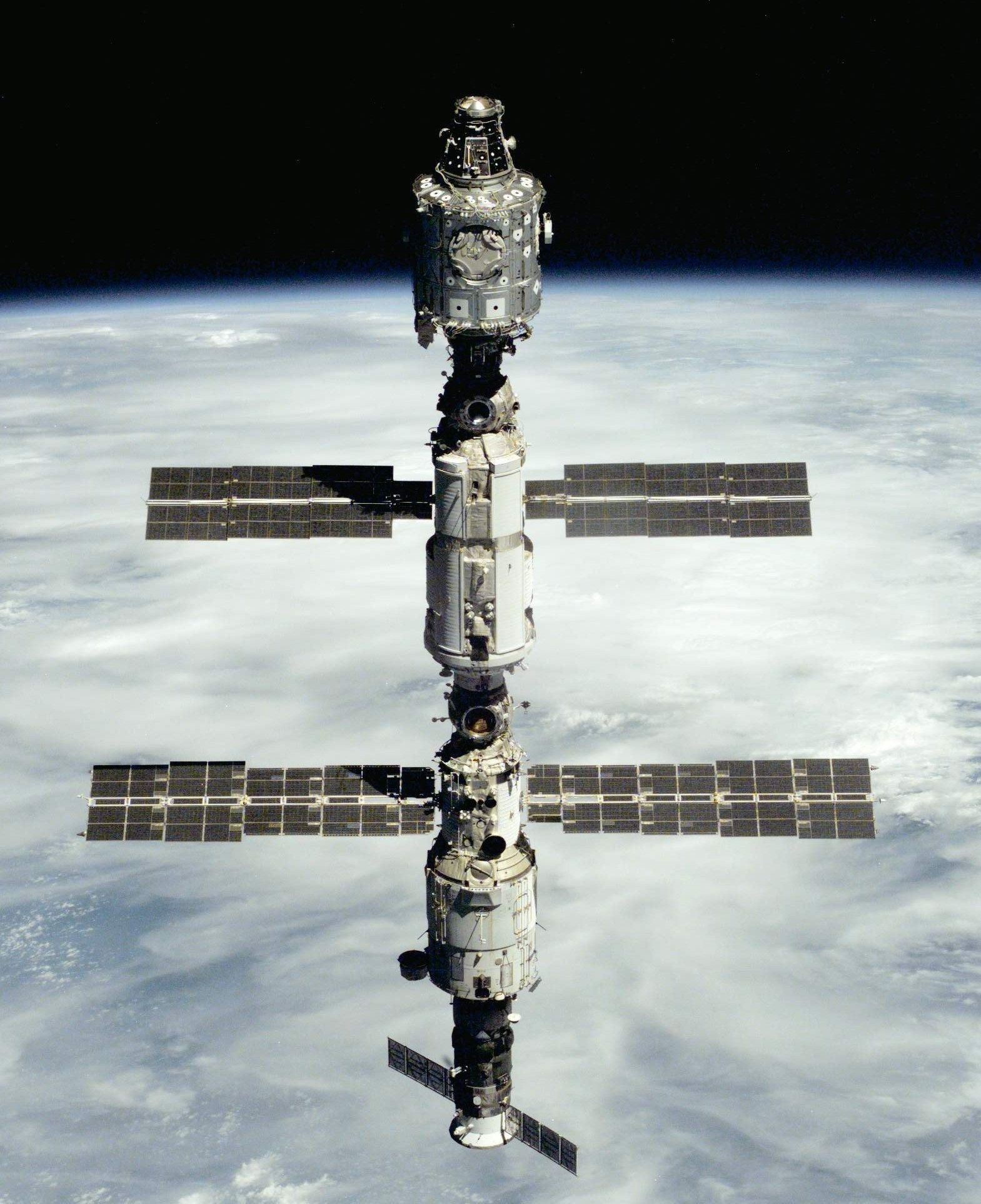
PMA-2, Unity Node 1, PMA-1, Zarya FGB, Zvezda Service Module, and Progress M1-3.

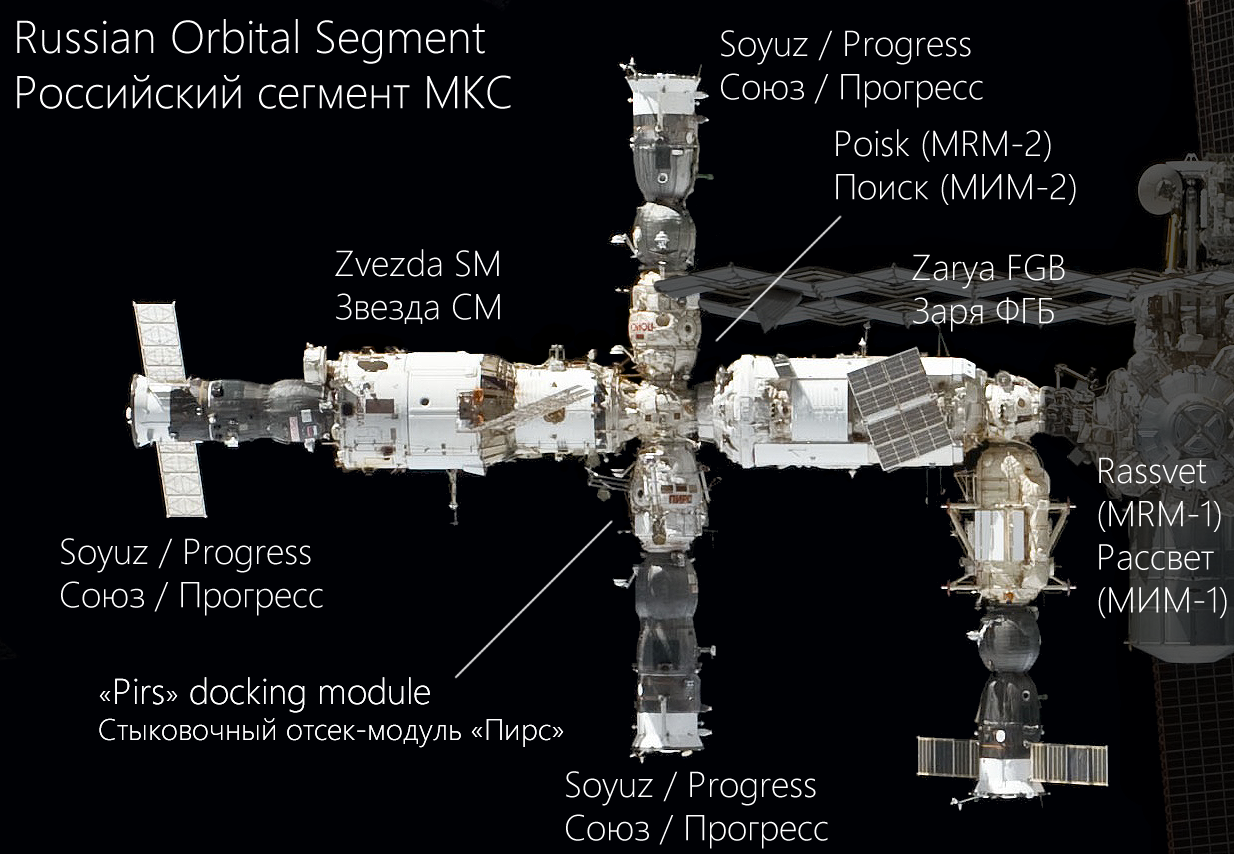
The location of Zvezda in the Russian Orbital Segment

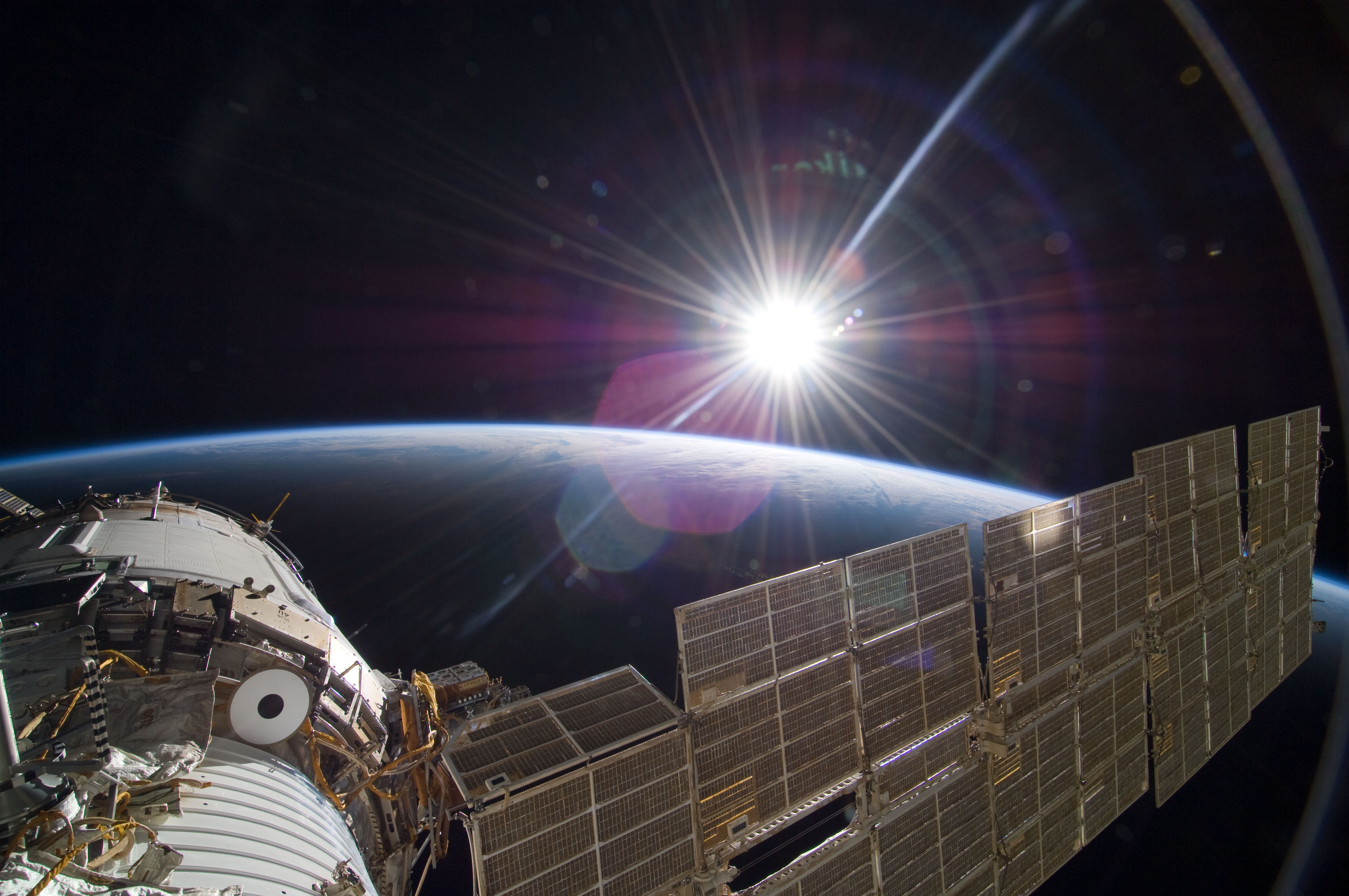
Sunrise in orbit overlooking Zvezda and its solar array

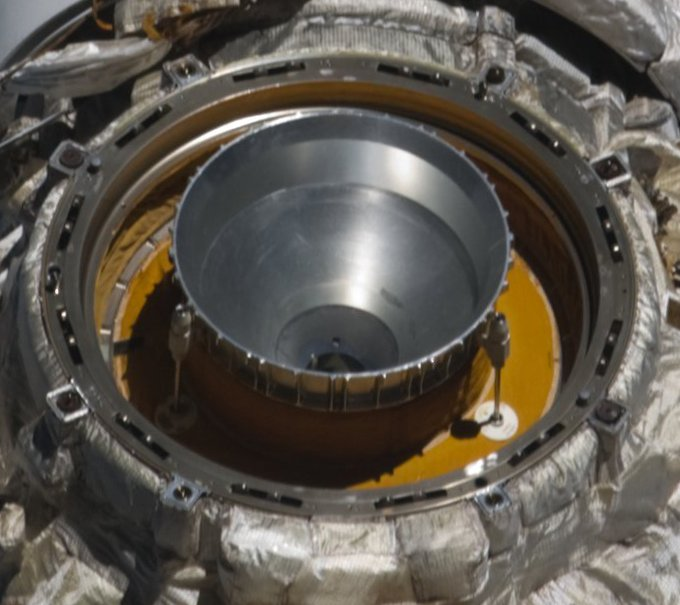
Zvezda nadir docking port where Pirs and Nauka were docked

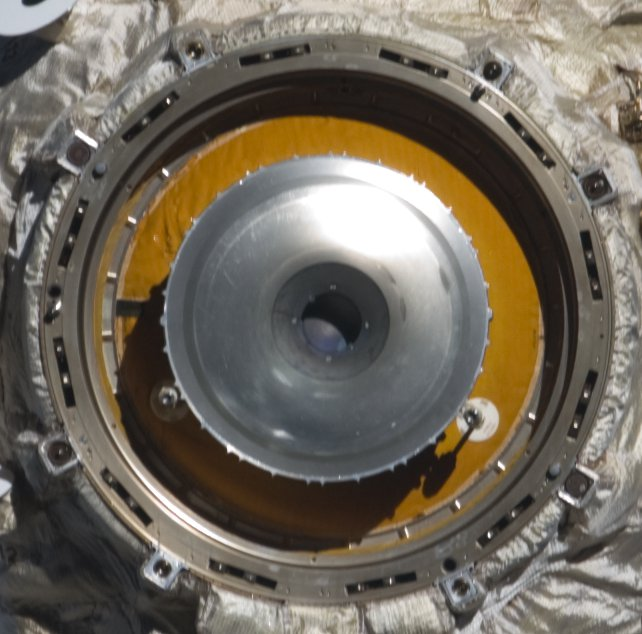
Zenith docking port on Zvezda where Poisk had docked

== Dockings ==
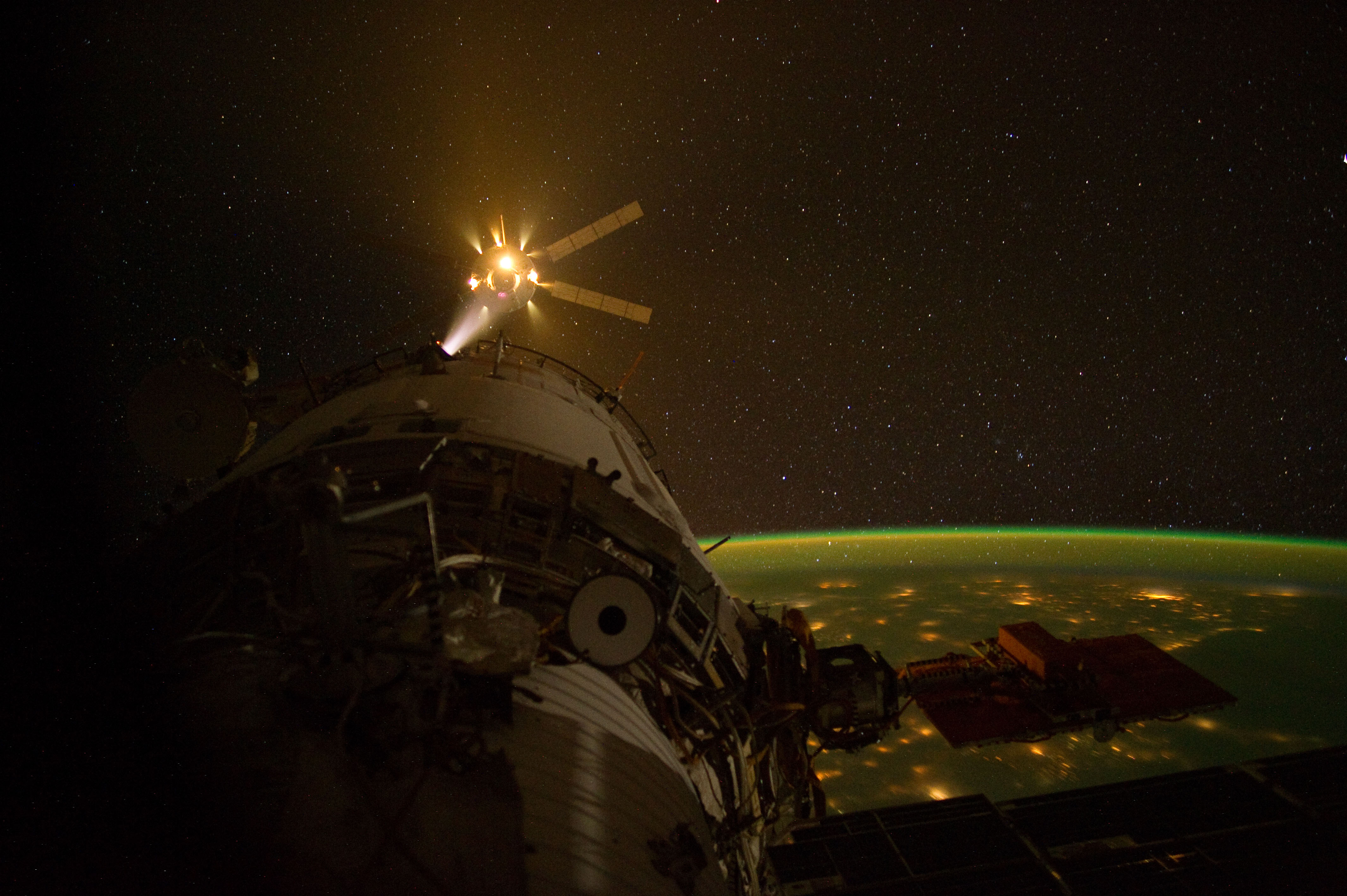
ATV-3 Edoardo Amaldi firing thrusters while approaching

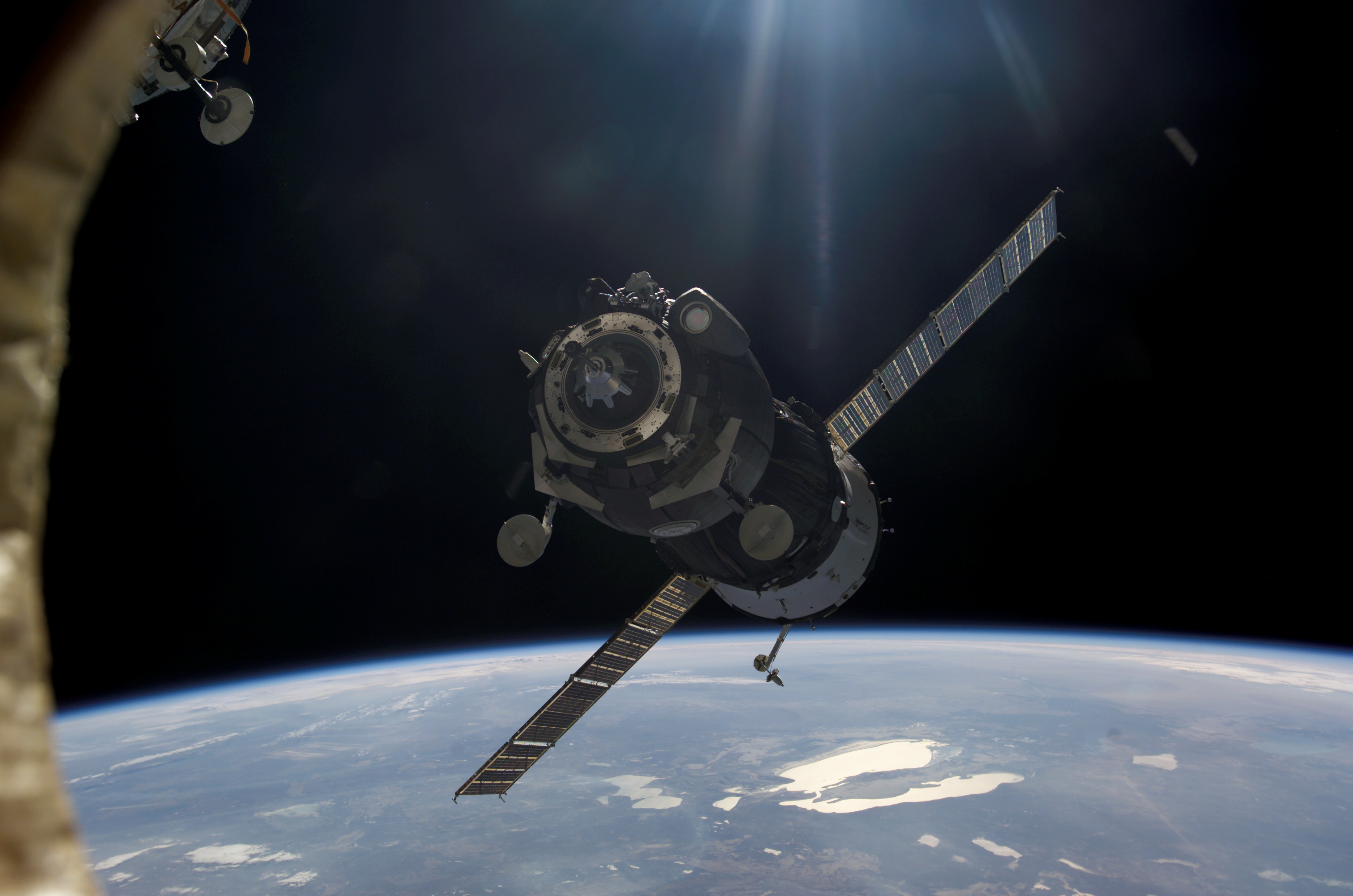
Soyuz TMA-7 arrives at ISS. It was docked with Zvezda in 2006, but also spent time docked with Pirs and Zarya.

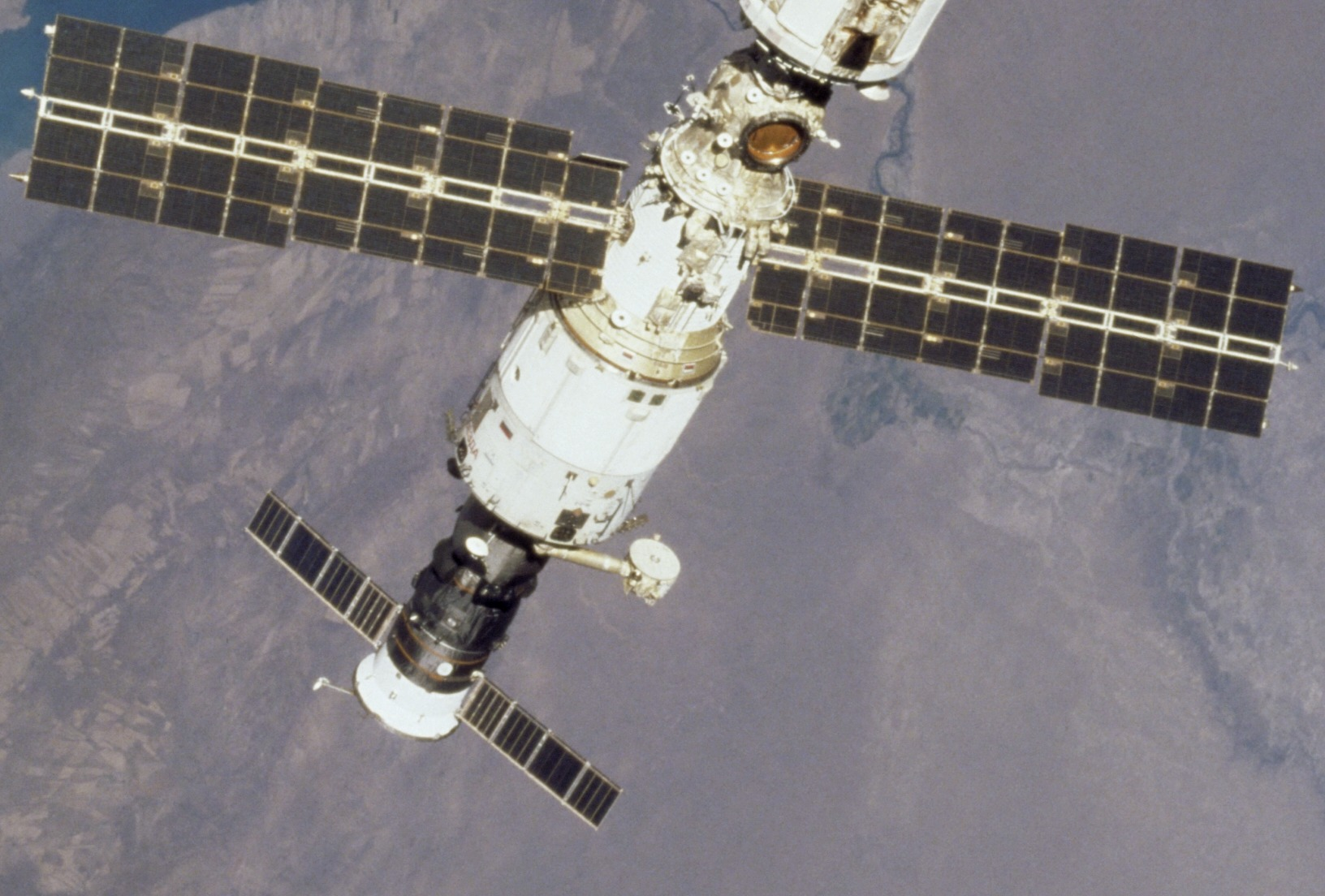
Zvezda docked with Progress M1-3

Spacecraft	Launch (UTC)	Launch vehicle	Launch pad	Docking	Undocking	Deorbit	Remarks
Forward
Zarya	20 November 1998; 06:40:00	Proton-K	Baikonur Cosmodrome; Site 81/23	26 July 2000; 01:45	—N/a		ISS-1A/R
Zenith
Poisk	10 November 2009; 14:22:04	Soyuz-U	Baikonur Cosmodrome; Site 1/5	12 November 2009; 15:44	—N/a		ISS-5R. Delivered by Progress M-MIM2 tug.
Nadir
Pirs	14 September 2001; 23:34:55	Soyuz-U	Baikonur Cosmodrome; Site 1/5	17 September 2001; 01:05	26 July 2021; 10:55	26 July 2021; 14:51	ISS-4R. Delivered by Progress DC-1 tug. Undocked and deorbited by Progress MS-16.
Nauka	21 July 2021; 14:58:25	Proton-M	Baikonur Cosmodrome; Site 200/39	29 July 2021; 13:29:01	—N/a		ISS-3R
Aft
Progress M1-3	6 August 2000; 18:26:42	Soyuz-U	Baikonur Cosmodrome; Site 1/5	8 August 2000; 20:12:56	1 November 2000; 04:04:49	1 November 2000; 07:53:20	ISS-1P
Soyuz TM-31	31 October 2000; 07:52:47	Soyuz-U	Baikonur Cosmodrome; Site 1/5	2 November 2000; 09:21:03	24 February 2001; 10:06	6 May 2001; 05:41:28	ISS-2R delivering Expedition 1. Translated to Zarya to allow docking of Progress M-44 before translating back to Zvedza. Returned with visiting crew delivered by Soyuz TM-32.
Soyuz TM-31	31 October 2000; 07:52:47	Soyuz-U	Baikonur Cosmodrome; Site 1/5	18 April 2001; 13:01	6 May 2001; 02:21:09	6 May 2001; 05:41:28	ISS-2R delivering Expedition 1. Translated to Zarya to allow docking of Progress M-44 before translating back to Zvedza. Returned with visiting crew delivered by Soyuz TM-32.
Progress M-44	26 February 2001; 08:09:35	Soyuz-U	Baikonur Cosmodrome; Site 1/5	28 February 2001; 09:49:47	16 April 2001; 08:48	16 April 2001; 14:11	ISS-3P
Progress M1-6	20 May 2001; 22:32:40	Soyuz-U	Baikonur Cosmodrome; Site 1/5	23 May 2001; 00:23:57	22 August 2001; 06:02	22 August 2001; 09:50	ISS-4P
Progress M-45	21 August 2001; 09:23:54	Soyuz-U	Baikonur Cosmodrome; Site 1/5	23 August 2001; 09:51:32	22 November 2001; 16:12:01	22 November 2001; 21:35:23	ISS-5P
Progress M1-7	26 November 2001; 18:24:12	Soyuz-FG	Baikonur Cosmodrome; Site 1/5	28 November 2001; 19:43:02	19 March 2002; 17:43	20 March 2002; 02:20	ISS-6P
Progress M1-8	21 March 2002; 20:13:39	Soyuz-U	Baikonur Cosmodrome; Site 1/5	24 March 2002; 20:57:56	25 June 2002; 08:26:30	25 June 2002; 12:25:52	ISS-7P
Progress M-46	26 June 2002; 05:36:30	Soyuz-U	Baikonur Cosmodrome; Site 1/5	29 June 2002; 05:36:30	24 September 2002; 13:58:49	14 October 2002; 10:21:59	ISS-8P
Progress M1-9	25 September 2002; 16:58:24	Soyuz-FG	Baikonur Cosmodrome; Site 1/5	29 September 2002; 17:00:54	1 February 2003; 16:00:54	1 February 2003; 20:00:28	ISS-9P
Progress M-47	2 February 2003; 12:59:40	Soyuz-U	Baikonur Cosmodrome; Site 1/5	4 February 2003; 14:49:04	27 August 2003; 22:48:08	28 August 2003; 02:37:46	ISS-10P
Progress M-48	29 August 2003; 01:47:59	Soyuz-U	Baikonur Cosmodrome; Site 1/5	31 August 2003; 03:40:45	28 January 2004; 08:35:56	28 January 2004; 13:57:12	ISS-12P
Progress M1-11	29 January 2004; 11:58:08	Soyuz-U	Baikonur Cosmodrome; Site 1/5	31 January 2004; 13:13:11	24 May 2004; 09:19:29	3 June 2004; 10:36:25	ISS-13P
Progress M-49	25 May 2004; 12:34:23	Soyuz-U	Baikonur Cosmodrome; Site 1/5	27 May 2004; 13:54:43	30 July 2004; 06:04:48	30 July 2004; 11:23:35	ISS-14P
Progress M-50	11 August 2004; 05:03:07	Soyuz-U	Baikonur Cosmodrome; Site 1/5	14 August 2004; 05:01:08	22 December 2004; 19:37:02	22 December 2004; 23:23:28	ISS-15P
Progress M-51	23 December 2004; 22:19:34	Soyuz-U	Baikonur Cosmodrome; Site 1/5	25 December 2004; 23:57:45	27 February 2005; 16:06:30	9 March 2005; 17:03:11	ISS-16P
Progress M-52	28 February 2005; 19:09:18	Soyuz-U	Baikonur Cosmodrome; Site 1/5	2 March 2005; 20:10:08	15 June 2005; 20:16:10	16 June 2005; 00:02:41	ISS-17P
Progress M-53	16 June 2005; 23:09:34	Soyuz-U	Baikonur Cosmodrome; Site 1/5	19 June 2005; 00:41:31	7 September 2005; 10:25:57	7 September 2005; 14:12:40	ISS-18P
Progress M-54	8 September 2005; 13:07:54	Soyuz-U	Baikonur Cosmodrome; Site 1/5	10 September 2005; 14:42:03	3 March 2006; 10:06:10	3 March 2006; 13:52:18	ISS-19P
Soyuz TMA-7	1 October 2005; 03:55:00	Soyuz-FG	Baikonur Cosmodrome; Site 1/5	20 March 2006; 07:11	8 April 2006; 20:28	8 April 2006; 23:48:00	ISS-11S. Had been docked to Zarya since 18 November 2005 after initially docking to Pirs on 3 October 2005 to deliver Expedition 12. Returned with visiting crew member launched on Soyuz TMA-8.
Progress M-56	24 April 2006; 16:03:25	Soyuz-U	Baikonur Cosmodrome; Site 1/5	26 April 2006; 17:41:31	19 September 2006; 00:28:17	19 September 2006; 04:14:40	ISS-21P
Soyuz TMA-9	18 September 2006; 04:08	Soyuz-FG	Baikonur Cosmodrome; Site 1/5	20 September 2006; 05:21	10 October 2006; 19:14	21 April 2007; 12:31	ISS-13S delivering Expedition 14. Translated to Zarya to allow docking of Progress M-58 before translating back to Zvedza. Returned with visiting crew member launched on Soyuz TMA-10.
Soyuz TMA-9	18 September 2006; 04:08	Soyuz-FG	Baikonur Cosmodrome; Site 1/5	29 March 2007; 23:54	21 April 2007; 09:11	21 April 2007; 12:31	ISS-13S delivering Expedition 14. Translated to Zarya to allow docking of Progress M-58 before translating back to Zvedza. Returned with visiting crew member launched on Soyuz TMA-10.
Progress M-58	23 October 2006; 13:40:36	Soyuz-U	Baikonur Cosmodrome; Site 1/5	26 October 2006; 14:28:46	27 March 2007; 18:11	27 March 2007; 23:30:22	ISS-23P
Progress M-60	12 May 2007; 03:25:36	Soyuz-U	Baikonur Cosmodrome; Site 1/5	15 May 2007; 05:10	19 September 2007; 00:36:51	25 September 2007; 19:47	ISS-25P
Soyuz TMA-10	7 April 2007; 17:31:09	Soyuz-FG	Baikonur Cosmodrome; Site 1/5	27 September 2007; 20:47	21 October 2007; 07:14	21 October 2007; 10:36	ISS-14S. Had been docked Zarya since 9 April 2007 after delivering Expedition 15. Returned with visiting crew member launched on Soyuz TMA-11.
Jules Verne	9 March 2008; 04:03	Ariane 5ES	Guiana Space Centre; ELA-3	3 April 2008; 14:45	5 September 2008; 21:29	29 September 2008; 13:31	ATV-1. First ATV resupply mission by the ESA.
Progress M-65	10 September 2008; 19:50	Soyuz-U	Baikonur Cosmodrome; Site 1/5	17 September 2008; 18:43	15 November 2008; 16:19	8 December 2008; 08:49	ISS-30P
Soyuz TMA-14	26 March 2009; 11:49:18	Soyuz-FG	Baikonur Cosmodrome; Site 1/5	28 March 2009; 13:05	2 July 2009; 21:29	11 October 2009; 04:32	ISS-18S delivering Expedition 19. Visiting crew member returned with Expedition 18 on Soyuz TMA-13. Translated to Pirs after undocking.
Progress M-67	24 July 2009; 10:56:56	Soyuz-U	Baikonur Cosmodrome; Site 1/5	29 July 2009; 11:12	21 September 2009; 07:25	27 September 2009	ISS-34P. Initial docking delayed due to delays in STS-127 mission. TORU manual control system had to be used during docking after vessel approached ISS in an incorrect orientation.
Soyuz TMA-16	30 September 2009; 07:14:45	Soyuz-FG	Baikonur Cosmodrome; Site 1/5	2 October 2009; 08:35	21 January 2010; 10:03	18 March 2010; 11:24	ISS-20S delivering Expedition 21. Visiting crew member returned with Expedition 20 on Soyuz TMA-14. Translated to Poisk after undocking.
Progress M-04M	3 February 2010; 03:45	Soyuz-U	Baikonur Cosmodrome; Site 1/5	5 February 2010; 04:26	10 May 2010; 11:16	1 July 2010; 13:54	ISS-36P. Was used for geophysical experiments during autonomous flight after undocking.
Soyuz TMA-17	20 December 2009; 21:52	Soyuz-FG	Baikonur Cosmodrome; Site 1/5	12 May 2010; 13:53	2 June 2010; 00:04	2 June 2010; 03:25	ISS-21S. Had been docked to Zarya since 22 December 2009 after delivering Expedition 22.
Soyuz TMA-19	15 June 2010; 21:35	Soyuz-FG	Baikonur Cosmodrome; Site 1/5	17 June 2010; 22:25	28 June 2010; 19:13	26 November 2010; 04:46	ISS-23S delivering Expedition 24. Translated to Rassvet after undocking.
Progress M-06M	30 June 2010; 15:35:00	Soyuz-U	Baikonur Cosmodrome; Site 1/5	4 July 2010; 16:17	31 August 2010; 11:25	6 September 2010; 16:13	ISS-38P. Initial docking attempt on 2 July was aborted by the Kurs system due to interference from the TORU manual system.
Progress M-07M	10 September 2010; 10:22:18	Soyuz-U	Baikonur Cosmodrome; Site 31/6	12 September 2010; 11:58	20 February 2011; 13:12	20 February 2011; 19:58	ISS-39P
Johannes Kepler	16 February 2011; 21:51	Ariane 5ES	Guiana Space Centre; ELA-3	24 February 2011; 15:59:19	20 June 2011; 15:46	21 June 2011; 20:44	ATV-2
Progress M-11M	21 June 2011; 14:38	Soyuz-U	Baikonur Cosmodrome; Site 1/5	23 June 2011; 16:37	23 August 2011; 09:34	1 September 2011	ISS-43P
Edoardo Amaldi	23 March 2012; 04:34:12	Ariane 5ES	Guiana Space Centre; ELA-3	28 March 2012; 22:51	28 September 2012; 21:44	3 October 2012; 01:23	ATV-3
Progress M-17M	31 October 2012; 07:41:19	Soyuz-U	Baikonur Cosmodrome; Site 1/5	31 October 2012; 13:40:00	15 April 2013; 12:02	21 April 2013; 15:02:00	ISS-49P
Progress M-19M	24 April 2013; 10:12:16	Soyuz-U	Baikonur Cosmodrome; Site 1/5	26 April 2013; 12:26:18	11 June 2013; 13:58	19 June 2013; 13:39	ISS-51P
Albert Einstein	5 June 2013; 21:52:11	Ariane 5ES	Guiana Space Centre; ELA-3	15 June 2013; 14:07	28 October 2013; 08:55	2 November 2013; 12:04	ATV-4
Soyuz TMA-09M	28 May 2013; 20:31:24	Soyuz-FG	Baikonur Cosmodrome; Site 1/5	1 November 2013; 08:33	10 November 2013; 08:54	11 November 2013; 02:49	ISS-35S. Had been docked to Rassvet since 29 May 2013 after delivering Expedition 36.
Progress M-21M	25 November 2013; 20:53:06	Soyuz-U	Baikonur Cosmodrome; Site 31/6	29 November 2013; 22:30:20	23 April 2014; 08:58	9 June 2014; 17:23	ISS-53P. The two-day free flight period in April 2014 was used to test the Kurs system after it had failed a prior test in November 2013.
Progress M-21M	25 November 2013; 20:53:06	Soyuz-U	Baikonur Cosmodrome; Site 31/6	25 April 2014; 12:13	9 June 2014; 13:29	9 June 2014; 17:23	ISS-53P. The two-day free flight period in April 2014 was used to test the Kurs system after it had failed a prior test in November 2013.
Georges Lemaître	29 July 2014; 23:47:38	Airane 5ES	Guiana Space Centre; ELA-3	12 August 2014; 13:30	14 February 2015; 13:42	15 February 2015; 18:04	ATV-5. Final ATV mission by the ESA.
Progress M-26M	17 February 2015; 11:00:17	Soyuz-U	Baikonur Cosmodrome; Site 1/5	17 February 2015; 16:57	14 August 2015; 10:19	14 August 2015; 14:17	ISS-58P
Soyuz TMA-16M	27 March 2015; 19:42:57	Soyuz-FG	Baikonur Cosmodrome; Site 1/5	28 August 2015; 03:30	11 September 2015; 21:29	12 September 2015; 00:51	ISS-42S. Had been docked to Poisk since 28 March 2015 after delivering Expedition 43. Returned with two visiting crew members launched on Soyuz TMA-18M.
Progress M-29M	1 October 2015; 16:49:40	Soyuz-U	Baikonur Cosmodrome; Site 1/5	1 October 2015; 22:52	30 March 2016; 14:14	8 April 2016; 13:31	ISS-61P
Progress MS-02	31 March 2016; 16:23:57	Soyuz-2.1a	Baikonur Cosmodrome; Site 31/6	2 April 2016; 17:58	14 October 2016; 09:37	14 October 2016	ISS-63P
Progress MS-06	14 June 2017; 09:20:13	Soyuz-2.1a	Baikonur Cosmodrome; Site 31/6	16 June 2017; 11:37	28 December 2017; 01:03:30	28 December 2017; 04:43	ISS-67P
Progress MS-08	13 February 2018; 08:13:33	Soyuz-2.1a	Baikonur Cosmodrome; Site 31/6	15 February 2018; 10:38	23 August 2018; 02:16	30 August 2018	ISS-69P
Progress MS-10	16 November 2018; 18:14:08	Soyuz-2.1a	Baikonur Cosmodrome; Site 31/6	18 November 2018; 19:31:38	4 June 2019; 08:40	4 June 2019; 11:28	ISS-71P
Soyuz MS-13	20 July 2019; 16:28:21	Soyuz-FG	Baikonur Cosmodrome; Site 1/5	20 July 2019; 22:47:50	26 August 2019; 03:35	6 February 2020; 09:12:45	ISS-59S delivering Expedition 60. Translated to Poisk after undocking.
Soyuz MS-14	22 August 2019; 03:38	Soyuz-2.1a	Baikonur Cosmodrome; Site 31/6	27 August 2019; 03:08	6 September 2019; 18:14	6 September 2019; 21:32	ISS-60S. Unmanned flight to test launch abort system modifications to adapt the Soyuz capsule to the Soyuz-2.1a launch vehicle. Intended to dock to Poisk on 24 August, but an electronic failure in Poisk's Kurs equipment caused an abort and the capsule was not equipped with a TORU backup system. Docking was diverted to Zvedza after Soyuz MS-13 repositioned to Poisk.
Soyuz MS-15	25 September 2019; 13:57:42	Soyuz-FG	Baikonur Cosmodrome; Site 1/5	25 September 2019; 19:42:40	17 April 2020; 01:53:00	17 April 2020; 05:16:10	ISS-61S delivering Expedition 61. Final flight of Soyuz-FG launch vehicle and final launch from Site 1/5. Visiting crew member returned with part of Expedition 60 crew on Soyuz MS-12. Returned with member of Expedition 60 crew launched on Soyuz MS-13.
Progress MS-14	25 April 2020; 01:51:41	Soyuz-2.1a	Baikonur Cosmodrome; Site 31/6	25 April 2020; 05:11:36	27 April 2021; 23:11:00	29 April 2021; 00:42	ISS-75P
Progress MS-18	28 October 2021; 00:00:32	Soyuz-2.1a	Baikonur Cosmodrome; Site 31/6	30 October 2021; 01:31:19	1 June 2022; 08:03	1 June 2022; 11:51	ISS-79P
Progress MS-20	3 June 2022; 09:32:00	Soyuz-2.1a	Baikonur Cosmodrome; Site 31/6	3 June 2022; 13:03	7 February 2023; 04:56	7 February 2023; 08:37	ISS-81P
Progress MS-22	9 February 2023; 06:15:36	Soyuz-2.1a	Baikonur Cosmodrome; Site 31/6	11 February 2023; 08:45	20 August 2023; 23:50	21 August 2023; 02:58	ISS-83P
Progress MS-24	23 August 2023; 01:08	Soyuz-2.1a	Baikonur Cosmodrome; Site 31/6	25 August 2023; 03:45	13 February 2024; 02:09	13 February 2024; 05:16	ISS-85P
Progress MS-26	15 February 2024; 03:25:06	Soyuz-2.1a	Baikonur Cosmodrome; Site 31/6	17 February 2024; 06:06:13	13 August 2024; 02:00:32	13 August 2024; 05:49	ISS-87P
Progress MS-28	15 August 2024; 03:20:17	Soyuz-2.1a	Baikonur Cosmodrome; Site 31/6	17 August 2024; 05:55:07	25 February 2025; 20:17:33	25 February 2025; 23:23	ISS-89P
Progress MS-30	27 February 2025; 21:24:27	Soyuz-2.1a	Baikonur Cosmodrome; Site 31/6	1 March 2025; 23:02:30	9 September 2025; 15:45:30	9 September 2025; 19:59	ISS-91P
Progress MS-32	11 September 2025; 15:54:06	Soyuz-2.1a	Baikonur Cosmodrome; Site 31/6	13 September 2025; 20:23	20 April 2026; 22:08:30	21 April 2026; 02:05	ISS-93P
Progress MS-34	25 April 2026; 22:21:47	Soyuz-2.1a	Baikonur Cosmodrome; Site 31/6	28 April 2026; 00:00:46	Planned for November 2026		ISS-95P. This is intended to be the last Progress flight to transfer cargo via the Zvedza aft docking port due to persistent air leaks in the aft transfer compartment, which will be sealed and decommissioned. Any future Progress dockings will only be for engine burns to raise ISS orbit.
