= Interim Control Module =

Module

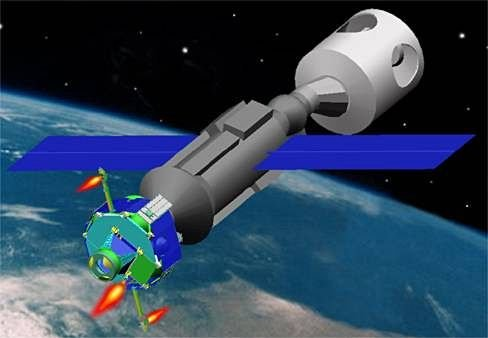
ISS Interim Control Module

The Interim Control Module (ICM) is a NASA-constructed module designed to serve as a temporary "tug" for the International Space Station in case the Zvezda service module was destroyed or not launched for an extended period of time.

== History ==
It was derived from a formerly classified Titan Launch Dispenser used to distribute reconnaissance satellites to different orbits. It would have been able to prolong the lifespan of the Zarya module by providing equivalent propulsion capabilities to the Service Module, although not any of the other life support capabilities.

In 1997 NASA requested that the Naval Research Laboratory study the feasibility of adapting an existing, heritage spaceflight system to provide low-cost, contingency propulsion operations for the International Space Station (ISS).

After determining that the system could be adapted in time to meet NASA's schedule requirements, NRL was granted authority to proceed with the Interim Control Module (ICM). From its inception ICM was a contingency option for attitude control and reboost of the ISS that would allow NASA to preserve the on-orbit construction schedule in case of delays in the launch of the Russian Service Module.

ICM was to launch on board the Space Shuttle, deploy from the Shuttle's cargo bay, and mate with the ISS at the Russian Control Module (called Zarya). Once on orbit ICM would provide sufficient fuel for one to three years of operation.

— NRL Spacecraft Engineering Department,

After the successful launch of Zvezda, ICM was placed in a caretaker status at NRL's Payload Processing Facility in Washington, D.C. Should it become necessary to complete and launch ICM, it was estimated that it would take between two and two-and-a-half years to do so.

Since the ICM was mothballed, a variety of new uses for it have been proposed. Most seriously, it was proposed for use as part of a robotic servicing mission for the Hubble Space Telescope, before the final Shuttle servicing mission was approved. The ICM has also been suggested as an integral part of a new telescope based on unused spy satellite hardware, and even for use in its original role in the event of removal of the Russian Orbital Segment of the ISS.
