= Progress M-56 =

Russian cargo spacecraft

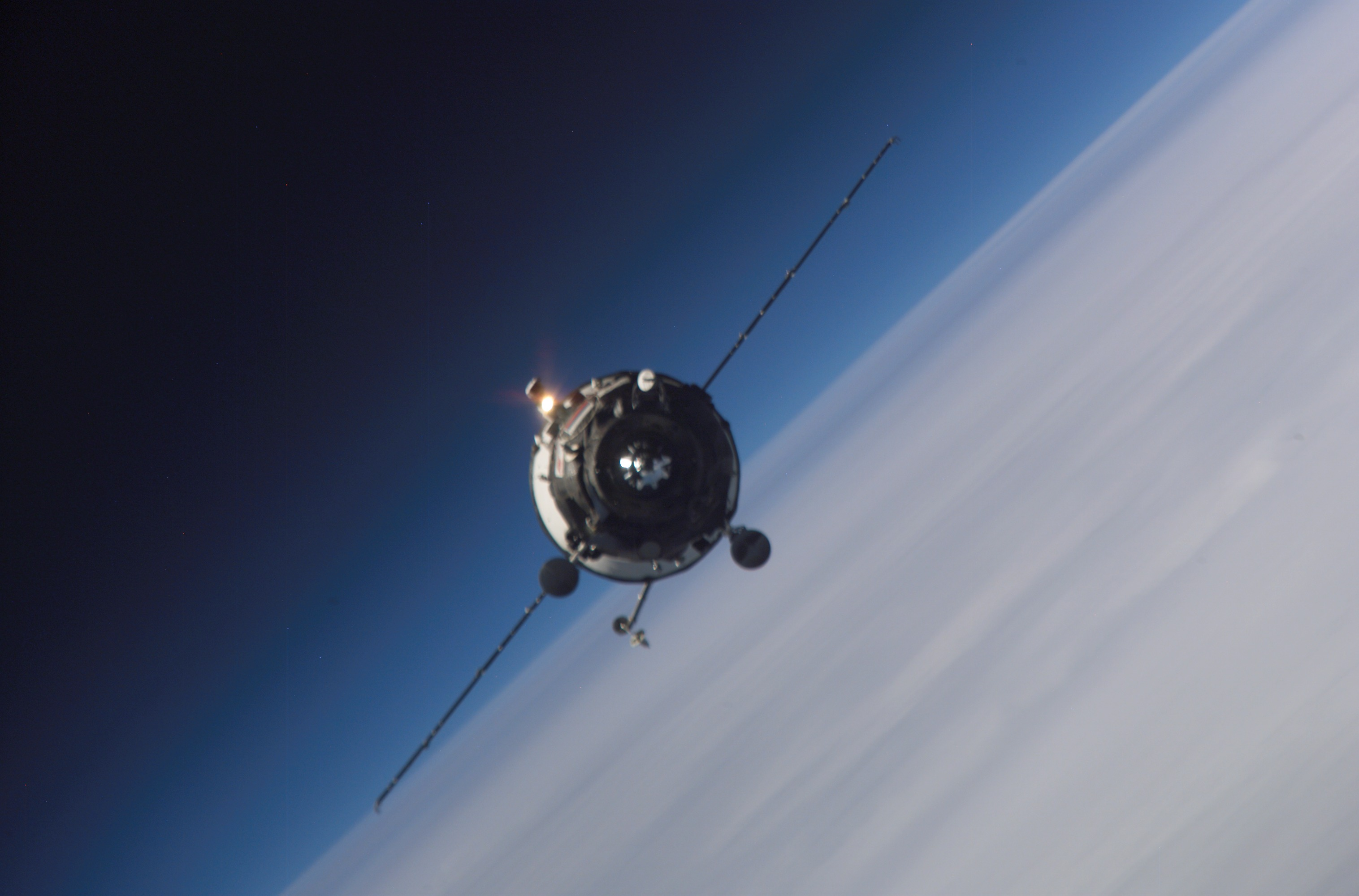
- Progress M-56 approaching the ISS.
- Mission type: ISS resupply
- Operator: Roskosmos
- COSPAR ID: 2006-013A
- SATCAT no.: 29057
- Mission duration: 148 days

Spacecraft properties
- Spacecraft type: Progress-M s/n 356
- Manufacturer: RKK Energia

Start of mission
- Launch date: 24 April 2006, 16:03:25 UTC
- Rocket: Soyuz-U
- Launch site: Baikonur, Site 1/5

End of mission
- Disposal: Deorbited
- Decay date: 19 September 2006, 04:14:40 UTC

Orbital parameters
- Reference system: Geocentric
- Regime: Low Earth
- Perigee altitude: 337 km
- Apogee altitude: 348 km
- Inclination: 51.6°
- Period: 91.4 minutes
- Epoch: 24 April 2006

Docking with ISS
- Docking port: Zvezda aft
- Docking date: 26 April 2006, 17:41:31 UTC
- Undocking date: 19 September 2006, 00:28:17 UTC
- Time docked: 146 days

Cargo
- Mass: 2600 kg
- Progress ISS Resupply

Progress M-56 (Russian: Прогресс М-56), identified by NASA as Progress 21P, was a Progress spacecraft used to resupply the International Space Station. It was a Progress-M 11F615A55 spacecraft, with the serial number 356.

== Launch ==
Progress M-56 was launched by a Soyuz-U carrier rocket from Site 1/5 at the Baikonur Cosmodrome. Launch occurred at 16:03:25 UTC on 24 April 2006. Also carried to the ISS was an experimental MIT students-built picosatellite, named SPHERE, that will float inside the station, strictly maintaining its location inside.

== Docking ==
The spacecraft docked with the aft port of the Zvezda module at 17:41:31 UTC on 26 April 2006. It remained docked for 146 days before undocking at 00:28:17 UTC on 19 September 2006 to make way for Soyuz TMA-9. It was deorbited at 03:28 UTC on 19 September 2006. The spacecraft burned up in the atmosphere over the Pacific Ocean, with any remaining debris landing in the ocean at around 04:14:40 UTC.

Progress M-56 carried supplies to the International Space Station, including food, water and oxygen for the crew and equipment for conducting scientific research.

== See also ==
- List of Progress flights
- Uncrewed spaceflights to the International Space Station
