= Progress M-51 =

Russian cargo spacecraft

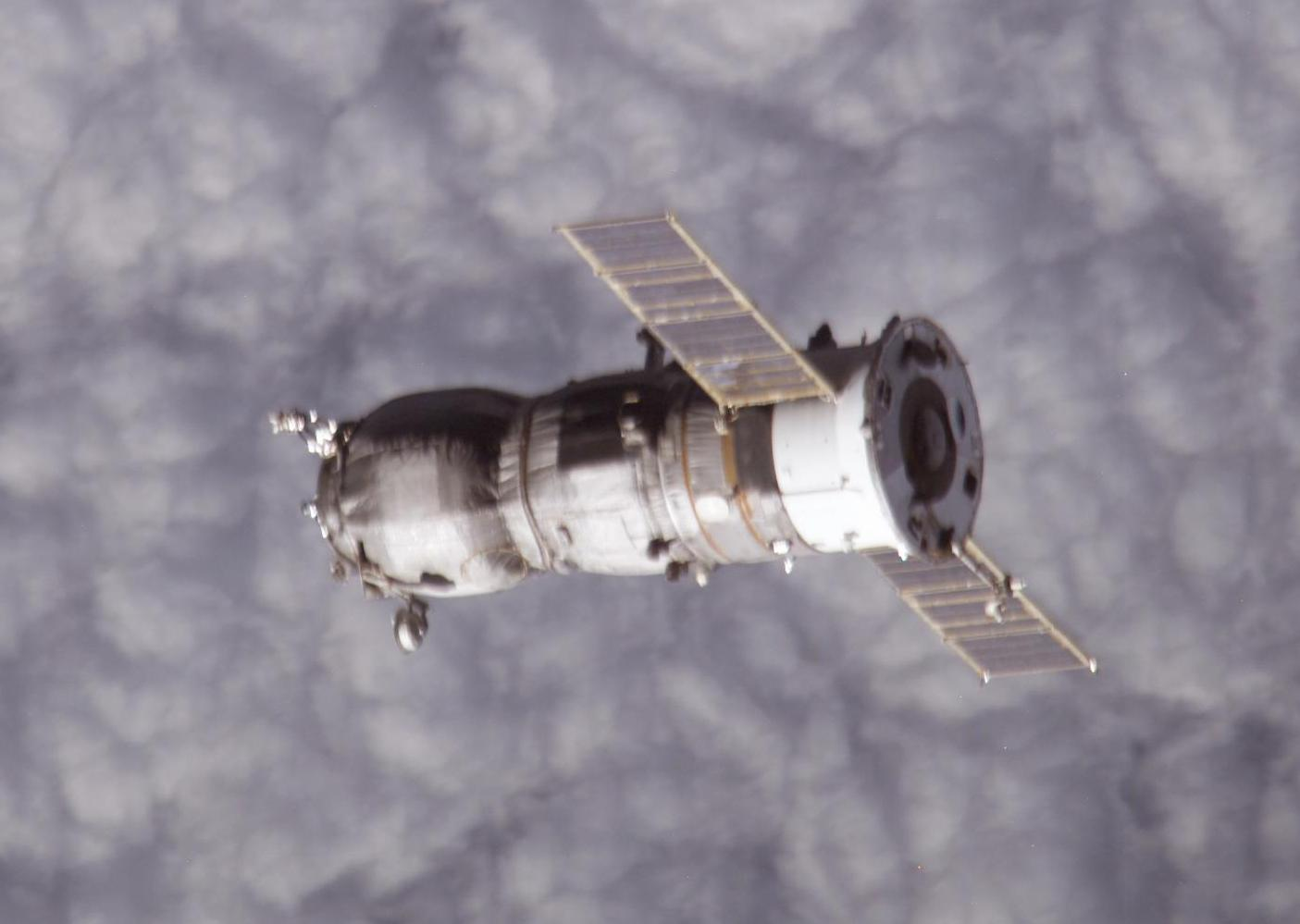
- Progress M-51 departing the ISS.
- Mission type: ISS resupply
- Operator: Roskosmos
- COSPAR ID: 2004-051A
- SATCAT no.: 28503
- Mission duration: 77 days

Spacecraft properties
- Spacecraft type: Progress-M s/n 351
- Manufacturer: RKK Energia

Start of mission
- Launch date: 23 December 2004, 22:19:34 UTC
- Rocket: Soyuz-U
- Launch site: Baikonur, Site 1/5

End of mission
- Disposal: Deorbited
- Decay date: 9 March 2005, 17:03:11 UTC

Orbital parameters
- Reference system: Geocentric
- Regime: Low Earth
- Perigee altitude: 351 km
- Apogee altitude: 356 km
- Inclination: 51.6°
- Period: 92.0 minutes
- Epoch: 23 December 2004

Docking with ISS
- Docking port: Zvezda aft
- Docking date: 25 December 2004, 23:57:45 UTC
- Undocking date: 27 February 2005, 16:06:30 UTC
- Time docked: 64 days

Cargo
- Mass: 2500 kg
- Progress ISS Resupply

Progress M-51 (Russian: Прогресс М-51), identified by NASA as Progress 16P, was a Progress spacecraft used to resupply the International Space Station. It was a Progress-M 11F615A55 spacecraft, with the serial number 351.

== Launch ==
Progress M-51 was launched by a Soyuz-U carrier rocket from Site 1/5 at the Baikonur Cosmodrome. Launch occurred at 22:19:34 UTC on 23 December 2004.

== Docking ==
The spacecraft docked with the aft port of the Zvezda module at 23:57:45 UTC on 25 December 2004. It remained docked for 64 days before undocking at 16:06:30 UTC on 27 February 2005. to make way for Progress M-52 Between undocking and deorbit, Progress M-51 was used for a series of tests. It was deorbited at 16:17:00 UTC on 9 March 2005. The spacecraft burned up in the atmosphere over the Pacific Ocean, with any remaining debris landing in the ocean at around 17:03:11 UTC.

Progress M-51 carried supplies to the International Space Station, including food, water and oxygen for the crew and equipment for conducting scientific research.

== See also ==
- List of Progress flights
- Uncrewed spaceflights to the International Space Station
