= List of R-7 launches (2000–2004) =

This is a list of launches made by the R-7 Semyorka ICBM, and its derivatives between 2000 and 2004. All launches are orbital satellite launches, unless stated otherwise.

Date and time (UTC)	Configuration	Serial number	Launch site	Result	Payload	Remarks
== 2000 ==
1 February 2000, 06:47	Soyuz-U (11A511U)		LC-1/5, Baikonur	Success	Progress M1-1	Mir Logistics
8 February 2000, 23:00	Soyuz-U / Fregat (11A511U)	ST-07	LC-31/6, Baikonur	Success	IRDT	
8 February 2000, 23:00	Soyuz-U / Fregat (11A511U)	ST-07	LC-31/6, Baikonur	Success	Gruzovoy Market	
20 March 2000, 18:28	Soyuz-U / Fregat (11A511U)	ST-08	LC-31/6, Baikonur	Success	Dumsat	
4 April 2000, 05:01	Soyuz-U (11A511U)		LC-1/5, Baikonur	Success	Soyuz TM-30	Crewed orbital flight, 2 cosmonauts Final crew of the Mir space station
25 April 2000, 20:08	Soyuz-U (11A511U)		LC-1/5, Baikonur	Success	Progress M1-2	Mir Logistics
3 May 2000, 13:25	Soyuz-U (11A511U)		LC-1/5, Baikonur	Success	Kosmos 2370	
16 July 2000, 12:39	Soyuz-U / Fregat (11A511U)	ST-09	LC-31/6, Baikonur	Success	Samba	
16 July 2000, 12:39	Soyuz-U / Fregat (11A511U)	ST-09	LC-31/6, Baikonur	Success	Salsa	
6 August 2000, 18:26	Soyuz-U (11A511U)		LC-1/5, Baikonur	Success	Progress M1-3 (1P)	ISS Logistics
9 August 2000, 11:13	Soyuz-U / Fregat (11A511U)	ST-10	LC-31/6, Baikonur	Success	Rumba	
9 August 2000, 11:13	Soyuz-U / Fregat (11A511U)	ST-10	LC-31/6, Baikonur	Success	Tango	
29 September 2000, 09:30	Soyuz-U (11A511U)		LC-31/6, Baikonur	Success	Kosmos 2375	
16 October 2000, 21:27	Soyuz-U (11A511U)		LC-1/5, Baikonur	Success	Progress M-43	Mir Logistics
31 October 2000, 07:52	Soyuz-U (11A511U)		LC-1/5, Baikonur	Success	Soyuz TM-31	Crewed orbital flight, 3 cosmonauts ISS Expedition 1
16 November 2000, 01:32	Soyuz-U (11A511U)		LC-1/5, Baikonur	Success	Progress M1-4 (2P)	ISS Logistics
== 2001 ==
24 January 2001, 04:28	Soyuz-U (11A511U)		LC-1/5, Baikonur	Success	Progress M1-5	Mir deorbit spacecraft
26 February 2001, 08:09	Soyuz-U (11A511U)		LC-1/5, Baikonur	Success	Progress M-44 (3P)	ISS Logistics
28 April 2001, 07:37	Soyuz-U (11A511U)		LC-1/5, Baikonur	Success	Soyuz TM-32	Crewed orbital flight, 3 cosmonauts Docked with the ISS
20 May 2001, 22:32	Soyuz-FG (11A511U-FG)	F15000-001	LC-1/5, Baikonur	Success	Progress M1-6 (4P)	ISS Logistics; Maiden flight of Soyuz-FG 11A511U-FG
29 May 2001, 17:55	Soyuz-U (11A511U)		LC-43/4, Plesetsk	Success	Kosmos 2377	
20 July 2001, 00:17	Molniya-M (8K78M)		LC-43/4, Plesetsk	Success	Molniya 3-51	
21 August 2001, 09:23	Soyuz-U (11A511U)		LC-1/5, Baikonur	Success	Progress M-45 (5P)	ISS Logistics
14 September 2001, 23:34	Soyuz-U (11A511U)		LC-1/5, Baikonur	Success	Progress M-SO1	ISS assembly mission 4R
14 September 2001, 23:34	Soyuz-U (11A511U)		LC-1/5, Baikonur	Success	Pirs	ISS airlock
21 October 2001, 08:59	Soyuz-U (11A511U)		LC-1/5, Baikonur	Success	Soyuz TM-33	Crewed orbital flight, 3 cosmonauts Docked with the ISS
25 October 2001, 11:34	Molniya-M (8K78M)		LC-43/3, Plesetsk	Success	Molniya 3-52	
26 November 2001, 18:24	Soyuz-FG (11A511U-FG)	F15000-002	LC-1/5, Baikonur	Success	Progress M1-7 (6P)	ISS Logistics
26 November 2001, 18:24	Soyuz-FG (11A511U-FG)	F15000-002	LC-1/5, Baikonur	Success	Kolibri 2000	
== 2002 ==
25 February 2002, 17:26	Soyuz-U (11A511U)		LC-43/3, Plesetsk	Success	Kosmos 2387	
21 March 2002, 20:13	Soyuz-U (11A511U)		LC-1/5, Baikonur	Success	Progress M1-8 (7P)	ISS Logistics
1 April 2002, 22:06	Molniya-M (8K78M)		LC-16/2, Plesetsk	Success	Kosmos 2388	
25 April 2002, 06:26	Soyuz-U (11A511U)		LC-1/5, Baikonur	Success	Soyuz TM-34	Crewed orbital flight, 3 cosmonauts Docked to the ISS
26 June 2002, 05:36	Soyuz-U (11A511U)		LC-1/5, Baikonur	Success	Progress M-46 (8P)	ISS Logistics
25 September 2002, 16:58	Soyuz-FG (11A511U-FG)	E15000-003	LC-1/5, Baikonur	Success	Progress M1-9 (9P)	ISS Logistics
15 October 2002, 18:20	Soyuz-U (11A511U)		LC-43/3, Plesetsk	Failure	Foton-M1	Ingestion of debris into the Blok D turbopump at T+8 seconds led to engine failure. The strap-on separated from the launch vehicle at T+20 seconds, which was automatically shut down by its onboard computer and impacted near the pad. One person on the ground was killed and several injured.
30 October 2002, 16:58	Soyuz-FG (11A511U-FG)	E15000-004	LC-1/5, Baikonur	Success	Soyuz TMA-1	Crewed flight with 3 Cosmonauts; Docked to the ISS; First crewed use of Soyuz-FG 11A511U-FG
24 December 2002, 12:20	Molniya-M (8K78M)		LC-16/2, Plesetsk	Success	Kosmos 2393	
== 2003 ==
2 February 2003, 12:59	Soyuz-U (11A511U)		LC-1/5, Baikonur	Success	Progress M-47 (10P)	ISS Logistics
2 April 2003, 01:53	Molniya-M (8K78M)		LC-16/2, Plesetsk	Success	Molniya 1-92	
26 April 2003, 03:53	Soyuz-FG (11A511U-FG)	15000-006	LC-1/5, Baikonur	Success	Soyuz TMA-2	Crewed flight with 2 Cosmonauts; ISS Expedition 7
2 June 2003, 18:24	Soyuz-FG / Fregat (11A511U-FG)	E15000-005/ ST-11	LC-31/6, Baikonur	Success	Mars Express	Mars orbiter
2 June 2003, 18:24	Soyuz-FG / Fregat (11A511U-FG)	E15000-005/ ST-11	LC-31/6, Baikonur	Success	Beagle 2	Mars lander Launched successfully but later failed
8 June 2003, 10:34	Soyuz-U (11A511U)		LC-1/5, Baikonur	Success	Progress M1-10 (11P)	ISS Logistics
19 June 2003, 20:00	Molniya-M (8K78M)		LC-16/2, Plesetsk	Success	Molniya 3-53	
12 August 2003, 14:20	Soyuz-U (11A511U)		LC-31/6, Baikonur	Success	Kosmos 2399	
29 August 2003, 01:47	Soyuz-U (11A511U)		LC-1/5, Baikonur	Success	Progress M-48 (12P)	ISS Logistics
18 October 2003, 05:38	Soyuz-FG (11A511U-FG)	D15000-007	LC-1/5, Baikonur	Success	Soyuz TMA-3	Crewed flight with 3 Cosmonauts; ISS Expedition 8
27 December 2003, 21:30	Soyuz-FG / Fregat (11A511U-FG)	D15000-008/ ST-12	LC-31/6, Baikonur	Success	Amos-2	Communications satellite
== 2004 ==
29 January 2004, 11:58	Soyuz-U (11A511U)		LC-1/5, Baikonur	Success	Progress M1-11 (13P)	ISS Logistics
18 February 2004, 07:05	Molniya-M (8K78M)		LC-16/2, Plesetsk	Success	Molniya-1T	
19 April 2004, 05:19	Soyuz-FG (11A511U-FG)	D15000-009	LC-1/5, Baikonur	Success	Soyuz TMA-4	Crewed flight with 3 Cosmonauts; ISS Expedition 9
25 May 2004, 12:34	Soyuz-U (11A511U)		LC-1/5, Baikonur	Success	Progress M-49 (14P)	ISS Logistics
11 August 2004, 05:03	Soyuz-U (11A511U)		LC-1/5, Baikonur	Success	Progress M-50 (15P)	ISS Logistics
24 September 2004, 16:50	Soyuz-U (11A511U)		LC-16/2, Plesetsk	Success	Kosmos 2410	
14 October 2004, 03:06	Soyuz-FG (11A511U-FG)	Zh15000-012	LC-1/5, Baikonur	Success	Soyuz TMA-5	Crewed flight with 3 Cosmonauts; ISS Expedition 10
8 November 2004, 18:30	Soyuz-2.1a (14A14A)		LC-43/4, Plesetsk	Success	Zenit-8 (boilerplate)	Suborbital test Maiden flight of Soyuz-2.1a 14A14A
23 December 2004, 22:19	Soyuz-U (11A511U)		LC-1/5, Baikonur	Success	Progress M-51 (16P)	ISS Logistics
