= Soyuz TM-30 =

Final crewed spaceflight to Mir

- Mission type: Mir crew transport
- Operator: Rosaviakosmos; MirCorp
- COSPAR ID: 2000-018A
- SATCAT no.: 26116
- Mission duration: 72 days, 19 hours, 42 minutes
- Orbits completed: 1,145

Spacecraft properties
- Spacecraft: Soyuz 7K-STM No.204
- Spacecraft type: Soyuz-TM
- Manufacturer: RKK Energia

Crew
- Crew size: 2
- Members: Sergei Zalyotin; Aleksandr Kaleri
- Callsign: Енисе́й (Yenisei)

Start of mission
- Launch date: April 4, 2000, 05:01:29 UTC
- Rocket: Soyuz-U
- Launch site: Baikonur 1/5

End of mission
- Landing date: June 16, 2000, 00:44 UTC
- Landing site: 49°54′N 67°12′E

Orbital parameters
- Reference system: Geocentric
- Regime: Low Earth
- Perigee altitude: 358 kilometres (222 mi)
- Apogee altitude: 384 kilometres (239 mi)
- Inclination: 51.6 degrees
- Period: 91.96 minutes
- Epoch: May 5, 2000

Docking with Mir
- Docking port: Core forward
- Docking date: April 6, 2000, 06:31:24 UTC
- Undocking date: June 15, 2000, 21:24 UTC
- Time docked: 70 days, 15 hours
- Soyuz programme (Crewed missions)

Soyuz TM-30 (Russian: Союз ТМ-30, Union TM-30), also known as Mir EO-28, was a Soyuz mission, the 39th and final human spaceflight to the Mir space station. The crew of the mission was sent by MirCorp, a privately funded company, to reactivate and repair the station. The crew also resupplied the station and boosted the station to an orbit with a low point (perigee) of 360 and a high point (apogee) of 378 kilometers (223 and 235 miles, respectively); the boost in the station's orbit was done by utilizing the engines of the Progress M1-1 and M1-2 spacecraft. At that time a transit between Mir and the International Space Station was already impossible - such a transfer was deemed undesired by NASA - and the orbital plane of ISS had been chosen some time before to be around 120 degrees away from that of Mir. The mission was the first privately funded mission to a space station.

The mission was part of an effort by MirCorp to refurbish and privatize the aging Mir space station, which was nearing the end of its operational life. Further commercially funded missions beyond Soyuz TM-30 were originally planned to continue the restoration efforts of the then 14-year-old space station, but insufficient funding and investment ultimately led to the de-orbit of the station in early 2001.

== Crew ==
Position	Crew
Commander	(Russia) Sergei Zalyotin; First spaceflight
Flight Engineer	(Russia) Aleksandr Kaleri; Third spaceflight

Soyuz TM-30 was the first spaceflight for flight commander Zalyotin, who became a cosmonaut in 1990 and completed his general training two years later in 1992. TM-30 was the third visit to space made by flight engineer Kaleri, who became a cosmonaut in 1984 and completed general training in 1986. He served as flight engineer aboard the Soyuz TM-14 and TM-24 missions to Mir in 1992 and 1996–7, respectively.

=== Backup crew ===
Position	Crew
Commander	(Russia) Salizhan Sharipov
Flight Engineer	(Russia) Pavel Vinogradov

While Soyuz TM-30 was in orbit, a second privately funded mission was being planned to continue the restoration efforts aboard Mir. The crew assigned to this mission, although never flown, was reported to have been the backup crew for TM-30, cosmonauts Salizhan Sharipov and Pavel Vinogradov.

== Background ==
Soyuz TM-30 was intended by MirCorp to be the first in a series of missions to refurbish the 14-year-old Mir space station for commercial use. Although the mission was scheduled to last approximately two months, commander Sergei Zalyotin said before the flight that if additional funds became available the mission could be extended until August, when another crew would replace them. The other possible scenario, which occurred in reality, was again to leave the station uninhabited, as had been done several months before the mission. Towards the end of Soyuz TM-30 plans were formed to send another privately funded mission to continue with MirCorp's maintenance efforts; cosmonauts Salizhan Sharipov and Pavel Vinogradov were tentatively assigned as the crew.

Actor Vladimir Steklov trained and was initially assigned for a 2000 flight on Soyuz TM-30 to film scenes for the movie Thieves and Prostitutes. Spaceflight is the Prize on Mir. The plans were scrapped weeks before launch due to lack of funding, and space scenes were filmed in studio instead.

== Mission highlights ==
The launch of Soyuz TM-30 on April 4, 2000

Soyuz TM-30 launched at 05:01:29 UT on April 4, 2000. Docking occurred on April 6 at 06:31:24 UT. Although the Soyuz docking system is automated under normal conditions, the final few meters of the approach to the station were executed in manual mode. The decision to switch to manual mode came after the cosmonauts noticed a small deviation in the spacecraft's approach to the targeted docking port. At about 09:32 UT on the day of docking, the crew prepared to open the hatches between the Soyuz spacecraft and the station. After entering the station the crew stabilized the atmosphere inside Mir and undertook routine maintenance work.

On April 25, an uncrewed Progress resupply mission, Progress M1-2, launched from the Baikonur Cosmodrome to the station to deliver supplies to the crew. Progress M1-2 docked with Mir on April 27. On April 26, the Progress M1-1 spacecraft, which had been docked since February and was used by the Russian Federal Space Agency to boost the station to a higher orbit, undocked and de-orbited over the Pacific Ocean east of New Zealand.

The mission's only Extra-Vehicular Activity, or spacewalk, took place on May 12, between 10:44 and 15:36 UTC. The primary objectives of the spacewalk were to repair damage to Mir's exterior components and record panoramas of the station's hull in order for experts on Earth to analyze the effects of space on the station itself. The cosmonauts inspected a malfunctioning solar array on the Kvant-1 module of the station. They discovered that a burnt-through wire connecting the array with its steering system was preventing its proper rotation. The array was subsequently deemed a loss.

On June 15, 2000, the TM-30 spacecraft undocked from the station at about 21:24 UT. The de-orbit burn occurred at about 23:52 UT and landing followed at about 00:44 UT on June 16, about 45 kilometers (28 mi) southeast of Arkalyk in Kazakhstan.

== Milestones ==
Soyuz TM-30 was the first privately funded crewed space expedition but several other firsts were also achieved, including the first privately funded extra-vehicular activity, and the first privately funded uncrewed resupply mission to a space station, utilizing the Progress-M1 spacecraft. Soyuz TM-30 also managed to delay the de-orbit of Mir, which was originally scheduled to occur some time in 2000, but ultimately occurred in March 2001.

== See also ==
- List of Mir Expeditions
- MirCorp
