= Progress M1-7 =

Russian cargo spacecraft

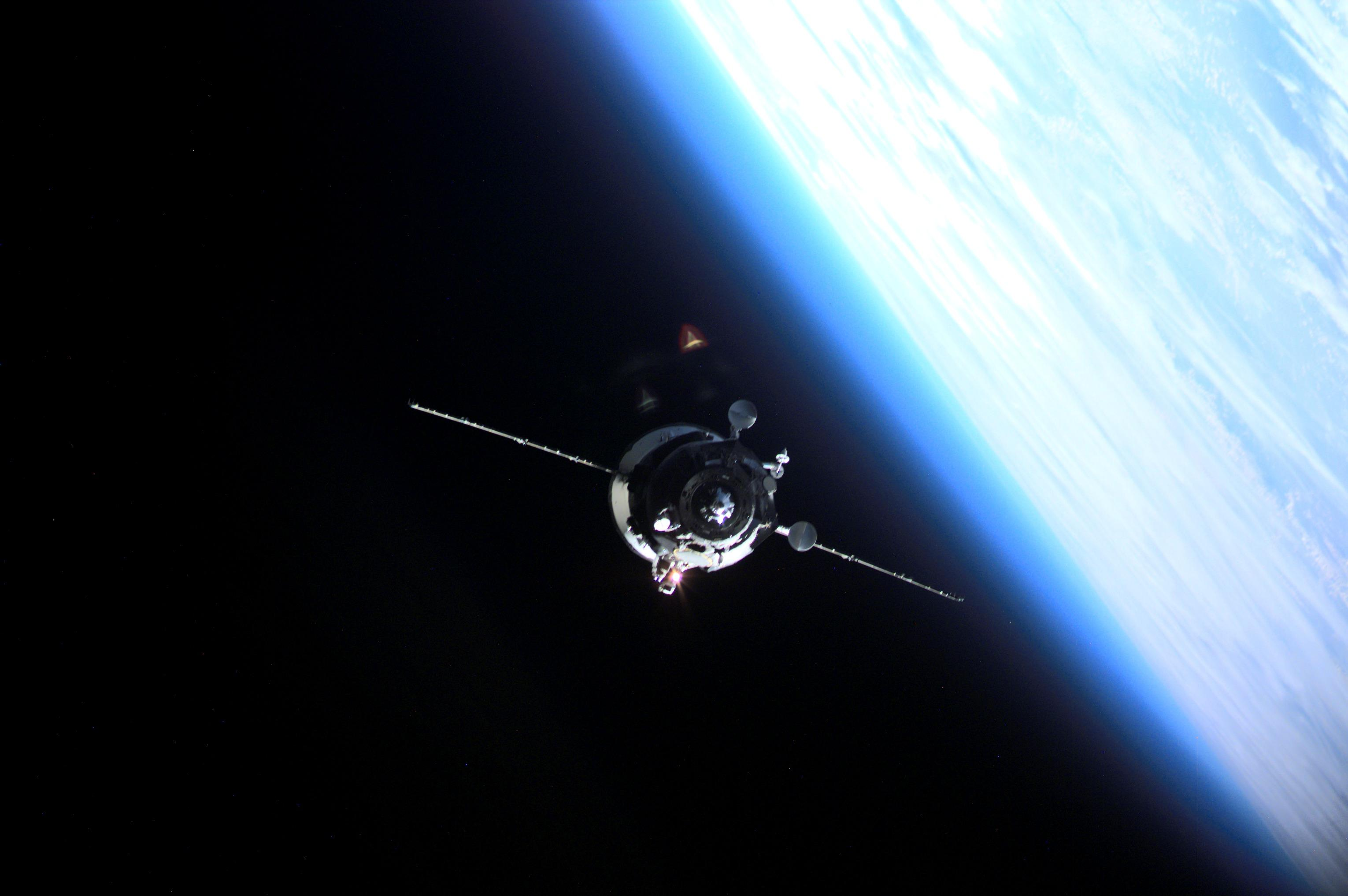
- Progress M1-7 approaching the ISS.
- Mission type: ISS resupply
- Operator: Roskosmos
- COSPAR ID: 2001-051A
- SATCAT no.: 26983
- Mission duration: 115 days

Spacecraft properties
- Spacecraft type: Progress-M1 s/n 256
- Manufacturer: RKK Energia

Start of mission
- Launch date: 26 November 2001, 18:24:12 UTC
- Rocket: Soyuz-FG
- Launch site: Baikonur, Site 1/5

End of mission
- Disposal: Deorbited
- Decay date: 20 March 2002, 02:20 UTC

Orbital parameters
- Reference system: Geocentric
- Regime: Low Earth
- Perigee altitude: 230 km
- Apogee altitude: 244 km
- Inclination: 51.6°
- Period: 89.2 minutes
- Epoch: 26 November 2001

Docking with ISS
- Docking port: Zvezda aft
- Docking date: 28 November 2001, 19:43:02 UTC
- Undocking date: 19 March 2002, 17:43 UTC
- Time docked: 112 days

Cargo
- Mass: 2500 kg
- Progress ISS Resupply

Progress M1-7, identified by NASA as Progress 6P, was a Progress spacecraft used to resupply the International Space Station. It was a Progress-M1 11F615A55 spacecraft, with the serial number 256.

== Launch ==
Progress M1-7 was launched by a Soyuz-FG carrier rocket from Site 1/5 at the Baikonur Cosmodrome. Launch occurred at 18:24:12 UTC on 26 November 2001. The spacecraft docked with the aft port of the Zvezda module at 19:43:02 UTC on 28 November. It was unable to establish a hard dock due to debris from Progress M-45 on the docking port, which had to be removed in an unscheduled extra-vehicular activity on 3 December 2001, after which it was able to establish a hard dock.

== Docking ==
Progress M1-7 remained docked to the ISS for 112 days before undocking at 17:43 UTC on 19 March 2002 to make way for Progress M1-8. It was deorbited at 01:27 UTC on 20 March 2002. The spacecraft burned up in the atmosphere over the Pacific Ocean, with any remaining debris landing in the ocean at around 02:20 UTC.

Progress M1-7 carried supplies to the International Space Station, including food, water and oxygen for the crew and equipment for conducting scientific research. It also carried the Kolibri-2000 (2001-051C) micro-satellite, which it deployed at 22:28 UTC on 19 March 2002, a few hours after departing the ISS.

== See also ==
- List of Progress flights
- Uncrewed spaceflights to the International Space Station
