= Progress M1-6 =

Russian cargo spacecraft

- Mission type: International Space Station resupply
- Operator: Roskosmos
- COSPAR ID: 2001-021A
- SATCAT no.: 26773
- Mission duration: 95 days

Spacecraft properties
- Spacecraft type: Progress-M1 s/n 255
- Manufacturer: RKK Energia

Start of mission
- Launch date: 20 May 2001, 22:32:40 UTC
- Rocket: Soyuz-FG
- Launch site: Baikonur, Site 1/5

End of mission
- Disposal: Deorbited
- Decay date: 22 August 2001, 09:50 UTC

Orbital parameters
- Reference system: Geocentric
- Regime: Low Earth
- Perigee altitude: 270 km
- Apogee altitude: 316 km
- Inclination: 51.6°
- Period: 90.4 minutes
- Epoch: 20 May 2001

Docking with ISS
- Docking port: Zvezda aft
- Docking date: 23 May 2001, 00:23:57 UTC
- Undocking date: 22 August 2001, 06:02 UTC
- Time docked: 91 days
- Progress ISS Resupply

Progress M1-6, identified by NASA as Progress 4P, was a Progress spacecraft used to resupply the International Space Station. It was a Progress-M1 11F615A55 spacecraft, with the serial number 255.

== Launch ==
Progress M1-6 was launched on the maiden flight of the Soyuz-FG carrier rocket, flying from Site 1/5 at the Baikonur Cosmodrome. Launch occurred at 22:32:40 UTC on 20 May 2001. The spacecraft docked with the aft port of the Zvezda module at 00:23:57 UTC on 23 May 2001.

== Undocking ==
It remained docked for 91 days before undocking at 06:02 UTC on 22 August 2001 to make way for Progress M-45. It was deorbited at 09:00 UTC on the same day, burning up in the atmosphere over the Pacific Ocean, with any remaining debris landing in the ocean at around 09:50 UTC.

Progress M1-6 carried supplies to the International Space Station, including food, water and oxygen for the crew and equipment for conducting scientific research.

== See also ==
- List of Progress flights
- Uncrewed spaceflights to the International Space Station
