= Progress M1-1 =

Russian cargo spacecraft

- Mission type: Mir resupply
- Operator: Roskosmos
- COSPAR ID: 2000-005A
- SATCAT no.: 26067

Spacecraft properties
- Spacecraft type: Progress-M1 11F615A55
- Manufacturer: RKK Energia

Start of mission
- Launch date: 1 February 2000, 06:47:23 UTC
- Rocket: Soyuz-U
- Launch site: Baikonur Site 1/5

End of mission
- Disposal: Deorbited
- Decay date: 26 April 2000

Orbital parameters
- Reference system: Geocentric
- Regime: Low Earth
- Inclination: 51.6 degrees

Docking with Mir
- Docking port: Kvant-1 Aft
- Docking date: 3 February 2000, 08:02:28 UTC
- Undocking date: 26 April 2000, 16:32:43 UTC
- Time docked: 83 days

Progress M1-1 was a Progress spacecraft which was launched by Russia in 2000 to resupply the Mir space station.

== Spacecraft ==
It was a Progress-M1 11F615A55 spacecraft, with the serial number 250. It was the first flight of the Progress-M1, a derivative of the Progress-M originally designed for resupplying the International Space Station, which was optimised for the transportation of fuel over pressurised cargo.

Progress M1-1 was launched by a Soyuz-U carrier rocket from Site 1/5 at the Baikonur Cosmodrome. Launch occurred at 06:47:23 GMT on 1 February 2000. The spacecraft docked with Mir, which was at that time uncrewed, at 08:02:28 GMT on 3 February – the docking port used was the aft port on the Kvant-1 module. It remained docked for 83 days before undocking at 16:32:43 GMT on 26 April to make way for Progress M1-2. It was deorbited at 19:26:03 GMT, and burned up in the atmosphere over the Pacific Ocean around fifty minutes later.

Progress M1-1 was used to reboost Mir, which was rapidly decaying from orbit at the time of its arrival. It carried nitrogen to repressurise the station following a leak, as well as supplies for the EO-28 crew, who arrived aboard Mir in April.

== See also ==
- 2000 in spaceflight
- List of Progress flights
- List of uncrewed spaceflights to Mir
