= Progress M1-8 =

Russian cargo spacecraft

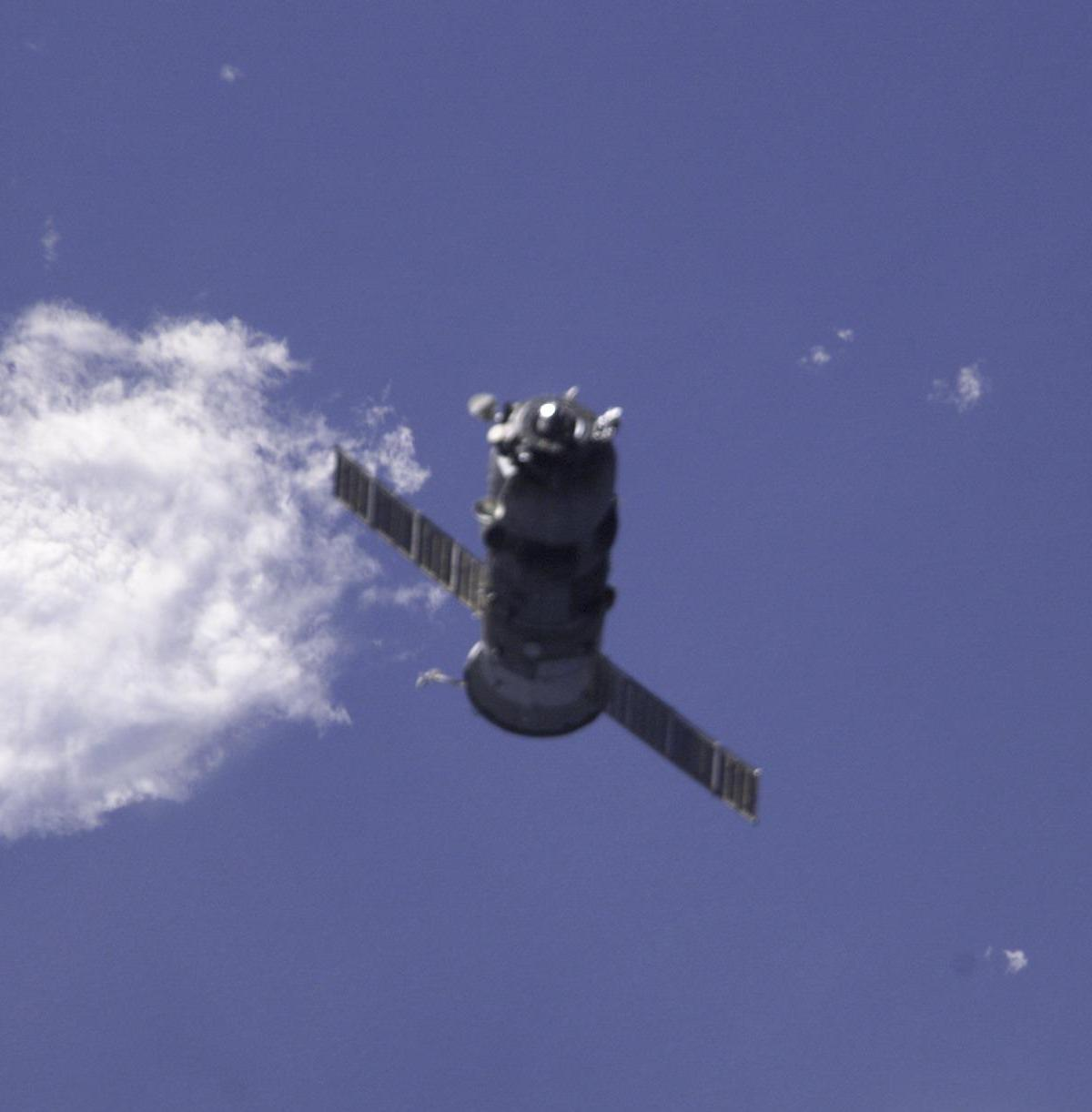
- Progress M1-8 departing the ISS.
- Mission type: ISS resupply
- Operator: Roskosmos
- COSPAR ID: 2002-013A
- SATCAT no.: 27395
- Mission duration: 96 days

Spacecraft properties
- Spacecraft type: Progress-M1 s/n 257
- Manufacturer: RKK Energia

Start of mission
- Launch date: 21 March 2002, 20:13:39 UTC
- Rocket: Soyuz-U
- Launch site: Baikonur, Site 1/5

End of mission
- Disposal: Deorbited
- Decay date: 25 June 2002, 12:26:52 UTC

Orbital parameters
- Reference system: Geocentric
- Regime: Low Earth
- Perigee altitude: 389 km
- Apogee altitude: 394 km
- Inclination: 51.6°
- Period: 92.4 minutes
- Epoch: 21 March 2002

Docking with ISS
- Docking port: Zvezda aft
- Docking date: 24 March 2002, 20:57:56 UTC
- Undocking date: 25 June 2002, 08:26:30 UTC
- Time docked: 93 days

Cargo
- Mass: 2400 kg
- Progress ISS Resupply

Progress M1-8, identified by NASA as Progress 7P, was a Progress spacecraft used to resupply the International Space Station. It was a Progress-M1 11F615A55 spacecraft, with the serial number 257.

== Launch ==
Progress M1-8 was launched by a Soyuz-U carrier rocket from Site 1/5 at the Baikonur Cosmodrome. Launch occurred at 20:13:39 UTC on 21 March 2002.

== Docking ==
The spacecraft docked with the aft port of the Zvezda module at 20:57:56 UTC on 24 March 2002. It remained docked for 93 days before undocking at 08:26:30 UTC on 25 June 2002 to make way for Progress M-46. It was deorbited at 11:35:00 UTC on the same day. The spacecraft burned up in the atmosphere over the Pacific Ocean, with any remaining debris landing in the ocean at around 12:26:52 UTC.

Progress M1-8 carried supplies to the International Space Station, including food, water and oxygen for the crew and equipment for conducting scientific research.

== See also ==
- List of Progress flights
- Uncrewed spaceflights to the International Space Station
