= Progress M1-9 =

Russian cargo spacecraft

- Mission type: ISS resupply
- Operator: Roskosmos
- COSPAR ID: 2002-045A
- SATCAT no.: 27531
- Mission duration: 129 days

Spacecraft properties
- Spacecraft type: Progress-M1 s/n 258
- Manufacturer: RKK Energia

Start of mission
- Launch date: 25 September 2002, 16:58:24 UTC
- Rocket: Soyuz-FG
- Launch site: Baikonur, Site 1/5

End of mission
- Disposal: Deorbited
- Decay date: 1 February 2003, 20:00:28 UTC

Orbital parameters
- Reference system: Geocentric
- Regime: Low Earth
- Perigee altitude: 281.5 km
- Apogee altitude: 323.5 km
- Inclination: 51.6°
- Period: minutes
- Epoch: 25 September 2002

Docking with ISS
- Docking port: Zvezda aft
- Docking date: 29 September 2002, 17:00:54 UTC
- Undocking date: 1 February 2003, 16:00:54 UTC
- Time docked: 125 days

Cargo
- Mass: 2500 kg
- Progress ISS Resupply

Progress M1-9, identified by NASA as Progress 9P, was a Progress spacecraft used to resupply the International Space Station. It was a Progress-M1 11F615A55 spacecraft, with the serial number 258.

== Launch ==
Progress M1-9 was launched by a Soyuz-FG carrier rocket from Site 1/5 at the Baikonur Cosmodrome. Launch occurred at 16:58:24 UTC on 25 September 2002.

== Docking ==
The spacecraft docked with the aft port of the Zvezda module at 17:00:54 UTC on 29 September 2002. It remained docked for 125 days before undocking at 16:00:54 GMT on 1 February 2003. to make way for Progress M-47 It was deorbited at 19:10:00 UTC on the same day, burning up in the atmosphere over the Pacific Ocean just six hours after the Space Shuttle Columbia had disintegrated over Texas. Any remaining debris from Progress M1-9 landed in the ocean at around 20:00:28 UTC.

Progress M1-9 carried supplies to the International Space Station, including food, water and oxygen for the crew and equipment for conducting scientific research.

== See also ==
- List of Progress flights
- Uncrewed spaceflights to the International Space Station
