= Kosmos 2393 =

Russian military early warning satellite

- Mission type: Early warning
- COSPAR ID: 2002-059A
- SATCAT no.: 27613
- Mission duration: 4 years

Spacecraft properties
- Spacecraft type: US-K
- Launch mass: 1,900 kilograms (4,200 lb)

Start of mission
- Launch date: 24 December 2002, 12:20 UTC
- Rocket: Molniya-M/2BL
- Launch site: Plesetsk Cosmodrome

End of mission
- Deactivated: February 2007
- Decay date: 22 December 2013

Orbital parameters
- Reference system: Geocentric
- Regime: Molniya
- Perigee altitude: 527 kilometres (327 mi)
- Apogee altitude: 39,173 kilometres (24,341 mi)
- Inclination: 62.8 degrees
- Period: 704.56 minutes

Kosmos 2393 (Russian: Космос 2393 meaning Cosmos 2393) is a Russian US-K missile early warning satellite which was launched in 2002 as part of the Russian Space Forces' Oko programme. The satellite is designed to identify missile launches using optical telescopes and infrared sensors.

Kosmos 2393 was launched from Site 16/2 at Plesetsk Cosmodrome in Russia. A Molniya-M carrier rocket with a 2BL upper stage was used to perform the launch, which took place at 12:20 UTC on 24 December 2002. The launch successfully placed the satellite into a molniya orbit. It subsequently received its Kosmos designation, and the international designator 2002-059A. The United States Space Command assigned it the Satellite Catalog Number 27613.

It stopped undertaking maneuvers to remain in its orbital position in February 2007 which probably indicates that it was not working from that date. It re-entered on December 22, 2013, according to one source.

== See also ==
- List of Kosmos satellites (2251–2500)
- List of R-7 launches (2000-2004)
- 2002 in spaceflight
- List of Oko satellites
