= Progress M1-10 =

Russian cargo spacecraft

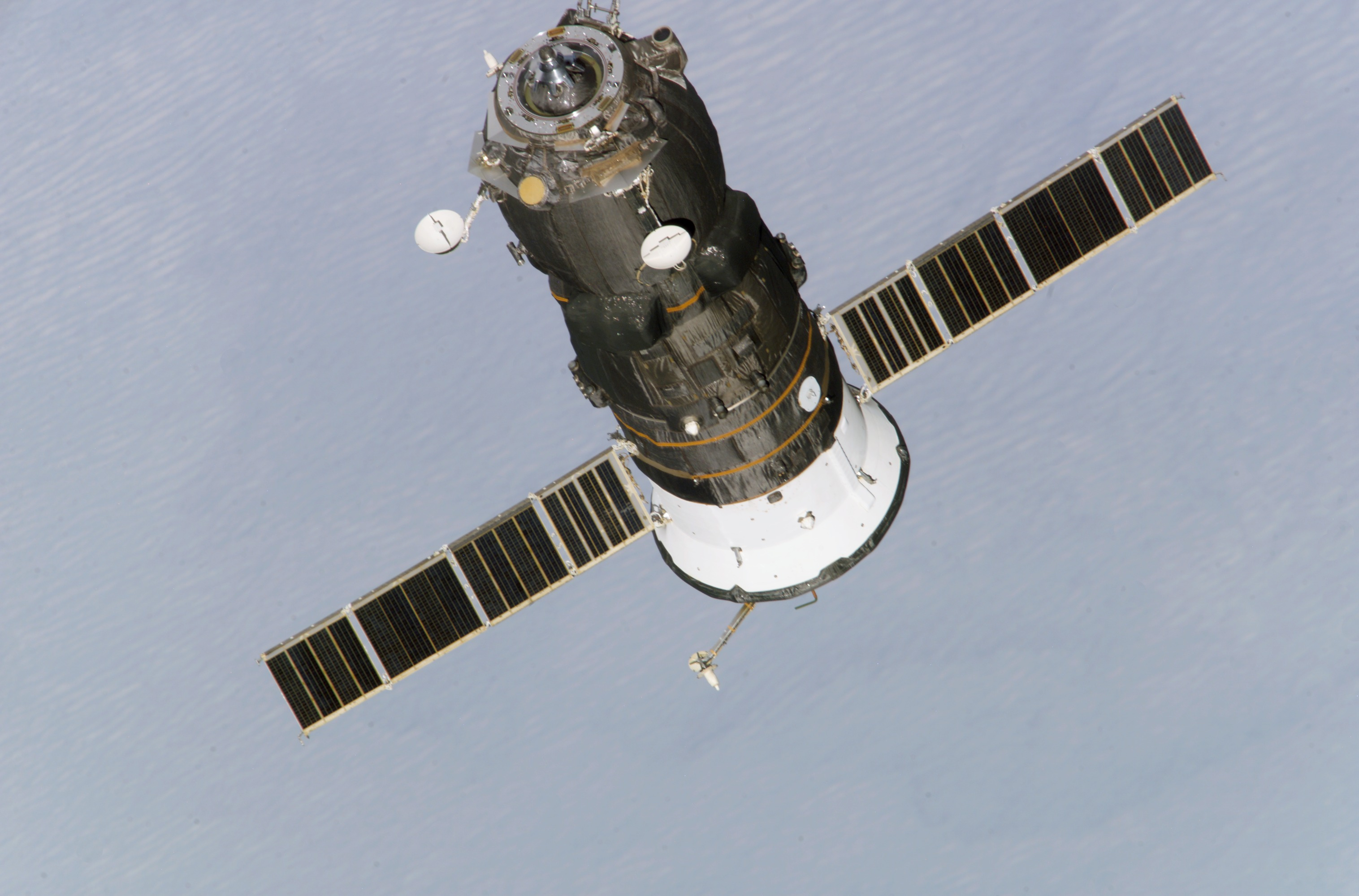
- Progress M1-10 departing the ISS.
- Mission type: ISS resupply
- Operator: Roskosmos
- COSPAR ID: 2003-025A
- SATCAT no.: 27823
- Mission duration: 117 days

Spacecraft properties
- Spacecraft type: Progress-M1 s/n 259
- Manufacturer: RKK Energia

Start of mission
- Launch date: 8 June 2003, 10:34:00 UTC
- Rocket: Soyuz-U
- Launch site: Baikonur, Site 1/5

End of mission
- Disposal: Deorbited
- Decay date: 3 October 2003, 12:38:49 UTC

Orbital parameters
- Reference system: Geocentric
- Regime: Low Earth
- Perigee altitude: 384 km
- Apogee altitude: 393 km
- Inclination: 51.6°
- Period: 92.3 minutes
- Epoch: 8 June 2003

Docking with ISS
- Docking port: Pirs
- Docking date: 11 June 2003, 11:14:53 UTC
- Undocking date: 4 September 2003, 19:41:44 UTC
- Time docked: 85 days

Cargo
- Mass: 2300 kg
- Progress ISS Resupply

Progress M1-10, identified by NASA as Progress 11P, was a Progress spacecraft used to resupply the International Space Station. It was a Progress-M1 11F615A55 spacecraft, with the serial number 259.

== Launch ==
Progress M1-10 was launched by a Soyuz-U carrier rocket from Site 1/5 at the Baikonur Cosmodrome. Launch occurred at 10:34 UTC on 8 June 2003.

== Docking ==
The spacecraft docked with the Pirs module at 11:14:53 UTC on 11 June 2003. It remained docked for 85 days before undocking at 19:41:44 UTC on 4 September 2003 to make way for Soyuz TMA-3. Following undocking, it remained in orbit for a month, conducting an earth observation mission. It was deorbited at 11:26 UTC on 3 October 2003, burning up in the atmosphere over the Pacific Ocean, with any remaining debris landing in the ocean at around 12:38:49 UTC.

Progress M1-10 carried supplies to the International Space Station, including food, water and oxygen for the crew and equipment for conducting scientific research.

== See also ==
- List of Progress flights
- Uncrewed spaceflights to the International Space Station
