= Progress M-44 =

Russian cargo spacecraft

- Mission type: International Space Station resupply
- Operator: Roskosmos
- COSPAR ID: 2001-008A
- SATCAT no.: 26713
- Mission duration: 49 days

Spacecraft properties
- Spacecraft type: Progress-M s/n 244
- Manufacturer: RSC Energia

Start of mission
- Launch date: 26 February 2001, 08:09:35 UTC
- Rocket: Soyuz-U
- Launch site: Baikonur, Site 1/5

End of mission
- Disposal: Deorbited
- Decay date: 16 April 2001, 14:11 UTC

Orbital parameters
- Reference system: Geocentric
- Regime: Low Earth
- Perigee altitude: 193 km
- Apogee altitude: 243 km
- Inclination: 51.6°
- Period: 88.64 minutes
- Epoch: 26 February 2001

Docking with ISS
- Docking port: Zvezda aft
- Docking date: 28 February 2001, 09:49:47 UTC
- Undocking date: 16 April 2001, 08:48 UTC
- Time docked: 47 days

Cargo
- Mass: 2500 kg
- Progress flights Progress ISS logistics flights

Progress M-44 (Russian: Прогресс М-44), identified by NASA as Progress 3P, was a Progress spacecraft used to resupply the International Space Station. It was a Progress-M 11F615A55 spacecraft, with the serial number 244.

== Launch ==
Progress M-44 was launched by a Soyuz-U carrier rocket from Site 1/5 at the Baikonur Cosmodrome. Launch occurred at 08:09:35 UTC on 26 February 2001. The spacecraft docked with the aft port of the Zvezda module at 09:49:47 UTC on 28 February 2001.

== Docking ==
It remained docked for 47 days before undocking at 08:48 UTC on 16 April 2001. It was deorbited at 13:23 UTC the same day. The spacecraft burned up in the atmosphere over the Pacific Ocean, with any remaining debris landing in the ocean at around 14:11 UTC.

Progress M-44 carried supplies to the International Space Station, including food, water and oxygen for the crew and equipment for conducting scientific research. It was the first Progress-M spacecraft to visit the ISS, previous resupply missions having used the Progress-M1.

== See also ==
- List of Progress flights
- Uncrewed spaceflights to the International Space Station
