= Kosmos 2388 =

Russian military early warning satellite

- Mission type: Early warning
- COSPAR ID: 2002-017A
- SATCAT no.: 27409
- Mission duration: 4 years

Spacecraft properties
- Spacecraft type: US-K
- Launch mass: 1,900 kilograms (4,200 lb)

Start of mission
- Launch date: 1 April 2002, 22:06 UTC
- Rocket: Molniya-M/2BL
- Launch site: Plesetsk Cosmodrome

End of mission
- Deactivated: November 2006
- Decay date: 14 September 2011

Orbital parameters
- Reference system: Geocentric
- Regime: Molniya
- Perigee altitude: 518 kilometres (322 mi)
- Apogee altitude: 39,727 kilometres (24,685 mi)
- Inclination: 62.9 degrees
- Period: 715.57 minutes

Kosmos 2388 (Russian: Космос 2388 meaning Cosmos 2388) was a Russian US-K missile early warning satellite which was launched in 2002 as part of the Russian Space Forces' Oko programme. The satellite was designed to identify missile launches using optical telescopes and infrared sensors.

Kosmos 2388 was launched from Site 16/2 at Plesetsk Cosmodrome in Russia. A Molniya-M carrier rocket with a 2BL upper stage was used to perform the launch, which took place at 22:06 UTC on 1 April 2002. The launch successfully placed the satellite into a molniya orbit. It subsequently received its Kosmos designation, and the international designator 2002-017A. The United States Space Command assigned it the Satellite Catalog Number 27409.

It stopped undertaking maneuvers to remain in its orbital position in November 2006 and re-entered the atmosphere on 14 September 2011.

== See also ==
- List of Kosmos satellites (2251–2500)
- List of R-7 launches (2000-2004)
- 2002 in spaceflight
- List of Oko satellites
