= Progress M-47 =

Russian spacecraft

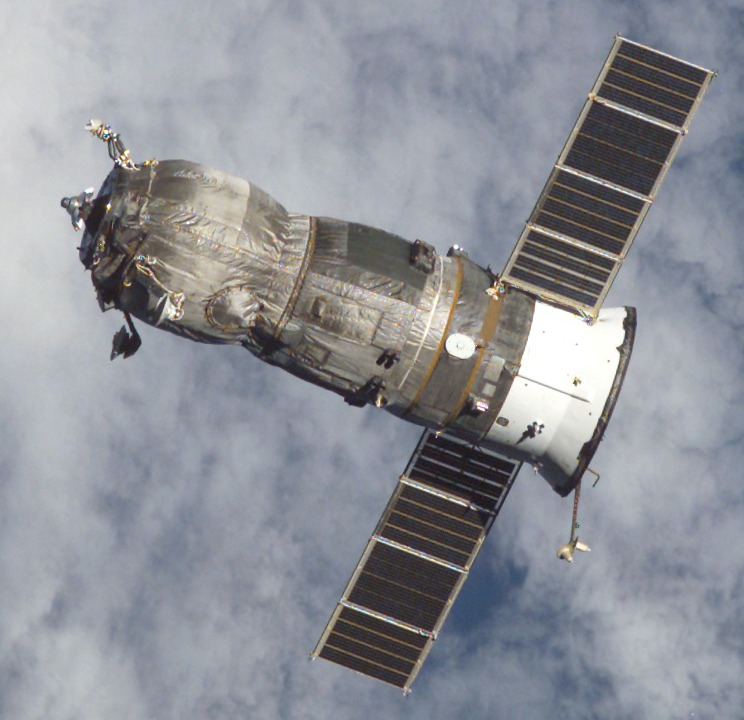
- Progress M-47 departing the ISS.
- Mission type: ISS resupply
- Operator: Roskosmos
- COSPAR ID: 2003-006A
- SATCAT no.: 27681
- Mission duration: 207 days

Spacecraft properties
- Spacecraft type: Progress-M s/n 247
- Manufacturer: RKK Energia

Start of mission
- Launch date: 2 February 2003, 12:59:40 UTC
- Rocket: Soyuz-U
- Launch site: Baikonur, Site 1/5

End of mission
- Disposal: Deorbited
- Decay date: 28 August 2003, 02:37:46 UTC

Orbital parameters
- Reference system: Geocentric
- Regime: Low Earth
- Perigee altitude: 384 km
- Apogee altitude: 400 km
- Inclination: 51.6°
- Period: 92.4 minutes
- Epoch: 2 February 2003

Docking with ISS
- Docking port: Zvezda aft
- Docking date: 4 February 2003, 14:49:04 UTC
- Undocking date: 27 August 2003, 22:48:08 UTC
- Time docked: 204 days

Cargo
- Mass: 2500 kg
- Progress ISS Resupply

Progress M-47 (Russian: Прогресс М-47), identified by NASA as Progress 10P, was a Progress spacecraft used to resupply the International Space Station. It was a Progress-M 11F615A55 spacecraft, with the serial number 247.

== Launch ==
Progress M-47 was launched by a Soyuz-U carrier rocket from Site 1/5 at the Baikonur Cosmodrome. Launch occurred at 12:59:40 GMT on 2 February 2003.

== Docking ==
The spacecraft docked with the aft port of the Zvezda module at 14:49:04 UTC on 4 February 2003. It remained docked for almost 204 days before undocking at 22:48:08 UTC on 27 August 2003. to make way for Progress M-48 It was deorbited at 01:49 UTC the next day. The spacecraft burned up in the atmosphere over the Pacific Ocean, with any remaining debris landing in the ocean at around 02:37:46 UTC.

Progress M-47 carried supplies to the International Space Station, including food, water and oxygen for the crew and equipment for conducting scientific research. It was the first spacecraft to launch to the International Space Station following the loss of the Space Shuttle Columbia the day prior to the Progress module's launch, which resulted in a suspension of Shuttle flights to the Station.

== See also ==
- List of Progress flights
- Uncrewed spaceflights to the International Space Station
