= Progress M1-2 =

Russian cargo spacecraft

- Mission type: Mir resupply
- Operator: Roskosmos; MirCorp
- COSPAR ID: 2000-021A
- SATCAT no.: 26301

Spacecraft properties
- Spacecraft type: Progress-M1 11F615A55
- Manufacturer: RKK Energia

Start of mission
- Launch date: 25 April 2000, 20:08:02 UTC
- Rocket: Soyuz-U
- Launch site: Baikonur Site 1/5

End of mission
- Disposal: Deorbited
- Decay date: 15 October 2000, 23:29 UTC

Orbital parameters
- Reference system: Geocentric
- Regime: Low Earth
- Inclination: 51.6 degrees

Docking with Mir
- Docking port: Kvant-1 Aft
- Docking date: 27 April 2000, 21:28:47 UTC
- Undocking date: 15 October 2000, 18:06 UTC
- Time docked: 171 days
- Progress flights Progress flights to Mir

Progress M1-2 was a Progress spacecraft which was launched by Russia in 2000 to resupply the Mir space station.

== Spacecraft ==
It was a Progress-M1 11F615A55 spacecraft, with the serial number 252.

Progress M1-2 was launched by a Soyuz-U carrier rocket from Site 1/5 at the Baikonur Cosmodrome. Launch occurred at 20:08:02 GMT on 25 April 2000. The spacecraft docked with the Aft port on the Kvant-1 module of Mir at 21:28:47 GMT on 27 April. It remained docked for 171 days before undocking at 18:06 GMT on 15 October to make way for Progress M-43. It was deorbited later the same day. The spacecraft burned up in the atmosphere over the Pacific Ocean at around 23:29 GMT.

Progress M1-2 carried supplies to Mir, including food, water and oxygen for the crew and equipment for conducting scientific research. Progress M1-2 was the first privately funded resupply mission to a space station. It was funded by RKK Energia as part of the MirCorp programme. It was the last Progress spacecraft to be docked to Mir whilst a crew was present aboard the station.

== See also ==
- 2000 in spaceflight
- List of Progress flights
- List of uncrewed spaceflights to Mir
