= Progress M1-4 =

Russian spacecraft

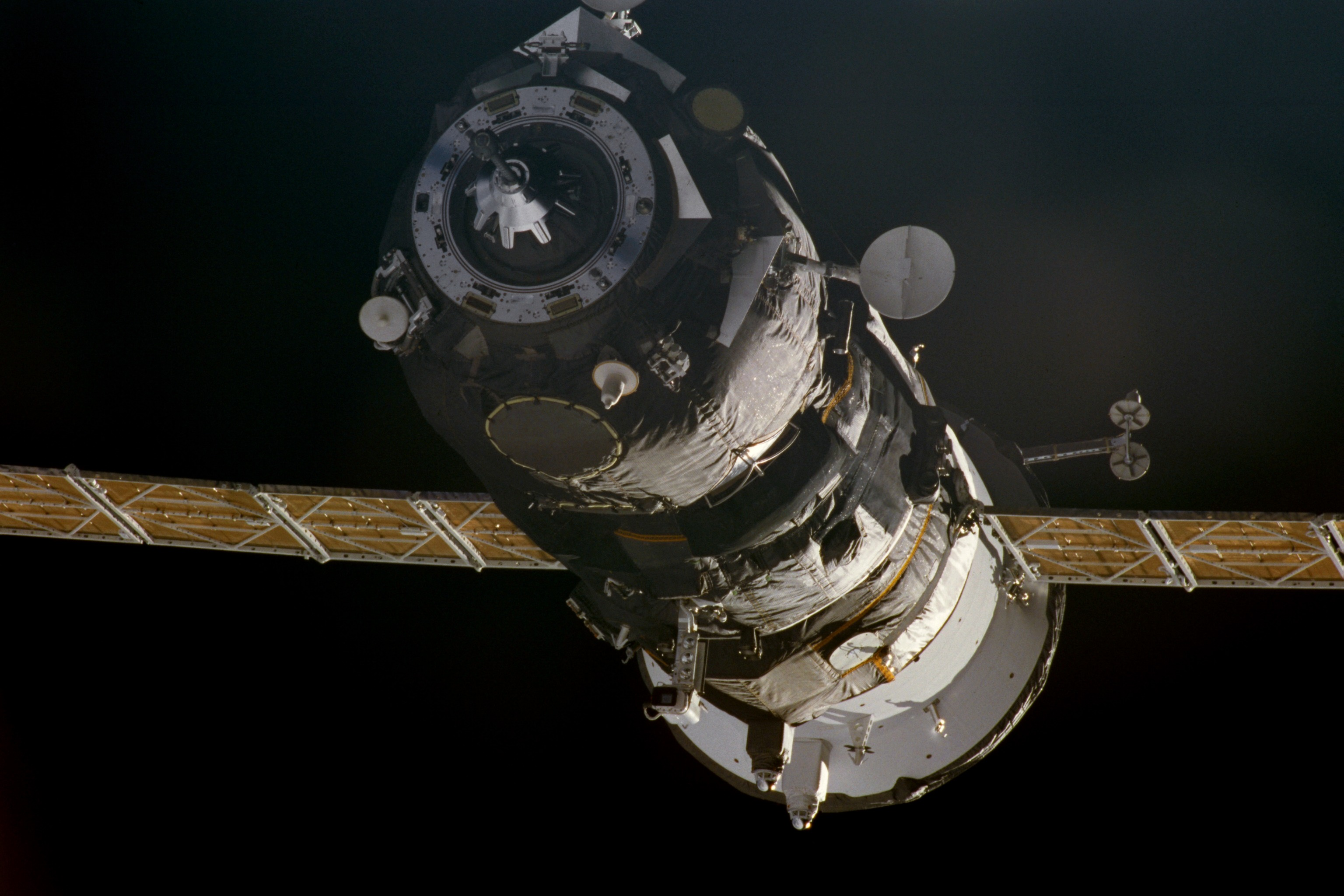
- Progress M1-4 during its first docking with the ISS.
- Names: Progress 2P; ISS 2P
- Mission type: ISS logistics
- Operator: Russian Space Agency
- COSPAR ID: 2000-073A
- SATCAT no.: 26615
- Mission duration: 84 days, 12 hours, 17 minutes

Spacecraft properties
- Spacecraft: Progress M1-3 No. 253
- Spacecraft type: Progress-M1 (11F615A55)
- Manufacturer: Energia

Start of mission
- Launch date: 16 November 2000, 01:32:36 UTC
- Rocket: Soyuz-U
- Launch site: Baikonur, Site 1/5

End of mission
- Disposal: Deorbited
- Decay date: 8 February 2001, 13:50 UTC

Orbital parameters
- Reference system: Geocentric
- Regime: Low Earth
- Perigee altitude: 372 km (231 mi)
- Apogee altitude: 379 km (235 mi)
- Inclination: 51.57°
- Period: 92 minutes
- Epoch: 16 November 2000

Docking with ISS
- Docking port: Zarya nadir
- Docking date: 18 November 2000, 03:47:42 UTC
- Undocking date: 1 December 2000, 16:22:52 UTC
- Time docked: 13 days, 12 hours, 35 minutes

Docking with ISS (redocking)
- Docking port: Zarya nadir
- Docking date: 26 December 2000, 11:03:13 UTC
- Undocking date: 8 February 2001, 11:26:04 UTC
- Time docked: 44 days, 22 minutes

Cargo
- Mass: 2,500 kg (5,500 lb)
- Progress ISS Resupply

Progress M1-4, identified by NASA as Progress 2P, was a Progress spacecraft used to resupply the International Space Station. It was a Progress M1 11F615A55 spacecraft, with the serial number 253.

== Launch and first docking ==
Progress M1-4 was launched by a Soyuz-U carrier rocket from Site 1/5 at the Baikonur Cosmodrome. Launch occurred at 01:32:36 UTC on 16 November 2000. The spacecraft docked with the Nadir port of the Zarya module at 03:47:42 UTC on 18 November. The Kurs docking system failed during docking, and the manual backup, TORU, was used for the docking. Progress M1-4 remained docked for two weeks before undocking at 16:22:52 UTC on 1 December.

== Second docking ==
Following its undocking, Progress M1-4 spent 25 days in free flight, prior to redocking with the same port on 26 December at 11:03:13 UTC. Like the original docking, the TORU system was used, as although the fault with the Kurs system had been resolved, the procedure used to abort the original Kurs docking attempt was irreversible due to the retraction of an antenna that could not be redeployed. It remained docked for 44 days before undocking again at 11:26:04 UTC on 8 February 2001. It was deorbited at 12:59 UTC on the same day. The spacecraft burned up in the atmosphere over the Pacific Ocean, with any remaining debris landing in the ocean at around 13:50 GMT.

Progress M1-4 carried supplies to the International Space Station, including food, water and oxygen for the crew and equipment for conducting scientific research. It was the first Progress spacecraft to resupply an Expedition crew aboard the ISS. Progress M1-4 was the first Progress spacecraft to make two dockings with the ISS, a feat that was not repeated until Progress M-15M in 2012.

== See also ==
- List of Progress flights
- Uncrewed spaceflights to the International Space Station
