= Progress M-46 =

Russian cargo spacecraft

- Mission type: ISS resupply
- Operator: Roskosmos
- COSPAR ID: 2002-033A
- SATCAT no.: 27454
- Mission duration: 104 days

Spacecraft properties
- Spacecraft type: Progress-M s/n 246
- Manufacturer: RKK Energia

Start of mission
- Launch date: 26 June 2002, 05:36:30 UTC
- Rocket: Soyuz-U
- Launch site: Baikonur, Site 1/5

End of mission
- Disposal: Deorbited
- Decay date: 14 October 2002, 10:21:59 UTC

Orbital parameters
- Reference system: Geocentric
- Regime: Low Earth
- Perigee altitude: 193 km
- Apogee altitude: 245 km
- Inclination: 51.6°
- Period: 88.6 minutes
- Epoch: 26 June 2002

Docking with ISS
- Docking port: Zvezda aft
- Docking date: 29 June 2002, 05:36:30 UTC
- Undocking date: 24 September 2002, 13:58:49 UTC
- Time docked: 87 days

Cargo
- Mass: 2500 kg
- Progress ISS Resupply

Progress M-46 (Russian: Прогресс М-46), identified by NASA as Progress 8P, was a Progress spacecraft used to resupply the International Space Station. It was a Progress-M 11F615A55 spacecraft, with the serial number 246.

== Launch ==
Progress M-46 was launched by a Soyuz-U carrier rocket from Site 1/5 at the Baikonur Cosmodrome. Launch occurred at 05:36:30 UTC on 26 June 2002.

== Docking ==
The spacecraft docked with the aft port of the Zvezda module at 05:36:30 UTC on 29 June 2002. Prior to docking it was used to conduct tests of the Kurs docking system. It remained docked for 87 days before undocking at 13:58:49 UTC on 24 September 2002 to make way for Progress M1-9. It was deorbited at 09:34:00 UTC on 14 October 2002. The spacecraft burned up in the atmosphere over the Pacific Ocean, with any remaining debris landing in the ocean at around 10:21:59 UTC.

Progress M-46 carried supplies to the International Space Station, including food, water and oxygen for the crew and equipment for conducting scientific research.

== See also ==
- List of Progress flights
- Uncrewed spaceflights to the International Space Station
