= Progress M-48 =

Russian cargo spacecraft

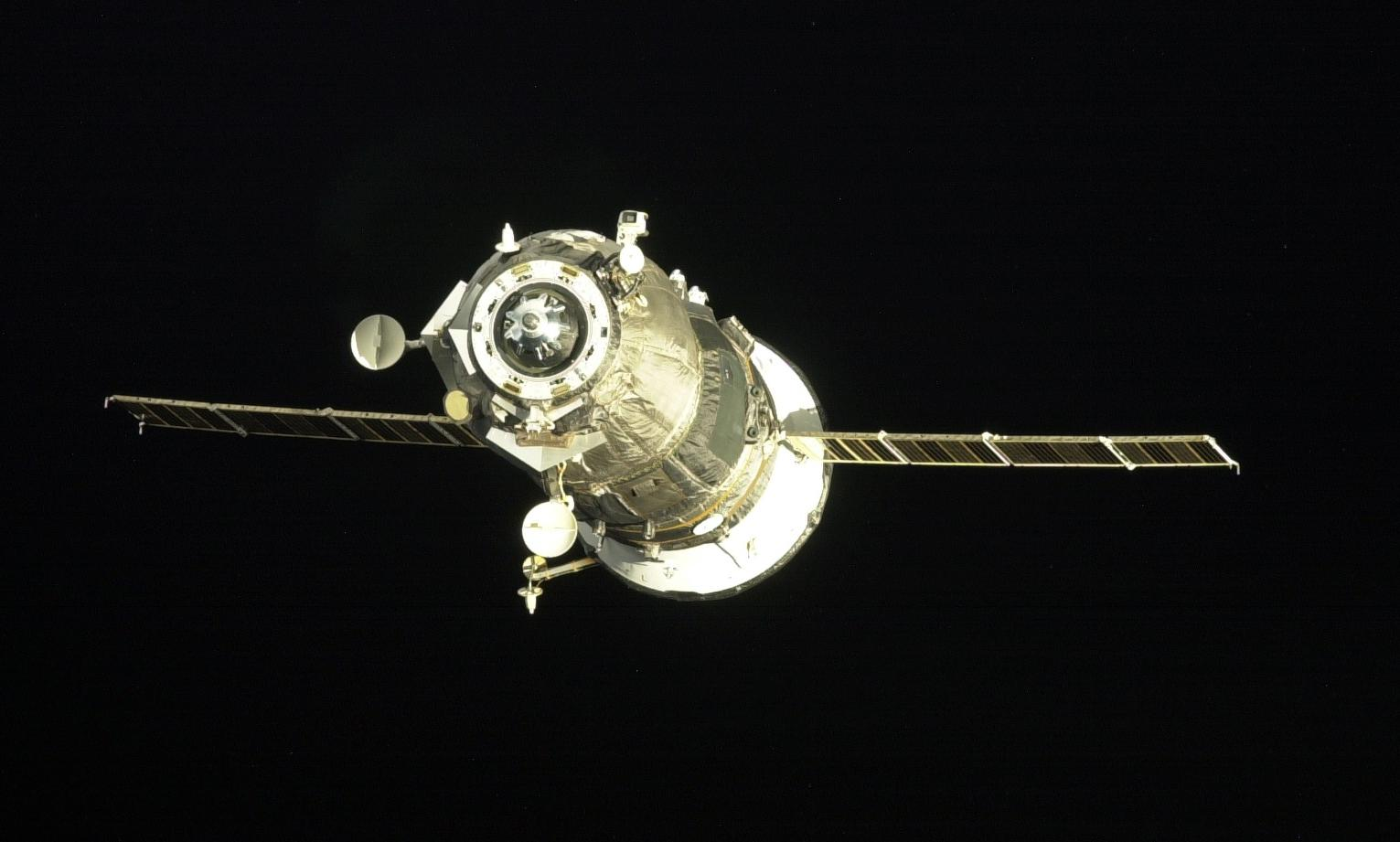
- Progress M-48 approaching the ISS.
- Mission type: ISS resupply
- Operator: Roskosmos
- COSPAR ID: 2003-039A
- SATCAT no.: 27873
- Mission duration: 152 days

Spacecraft properties
- Spacecraft type: Progress-M s/n 248
- Manufacturer: RKK Energia

Start of mission
- Launch date: 29 August 2003, 01:47:59 UTC
- Rocket: Soyuz-U
- Launch site: Baikonur, Site 1/5

End of mission
- Disposal: Deorbited
- Decay date: 28 January 2004, 13:57:12 UTC

Orbital parameters
- Reference system: Geocentric
- Regime: Low Earth
- Perigee altitude: 253 km
- Apogee altitude: 347 km
- Inclination: 51.6°
- Period: 90.5 minutes
- Epoch: 29 August 2003

Docking with ISS
- Docking port: Zvezda aft
- Docking date: 31 August 2003, 03:40:45 UTC
- Undocking date: 28 January 2004, 08:35:56 UTC
- Time docked: 150 days

Cargo
- Mass: 2600 kg
- Progress ISS Resupply

Progress M-48 (Russian: Прогресс М-48), identified by NASA as Progress 12P, was a Progress spacecraft used to resupply the International Space Station. It was a Progress-M 11F615A55 spacecraft, with the serial number 248.

== Launch ==
Progress M-48 was launched by a Soyuz-U carrier rocket from Site 1/5 at the Baikonur Cosmodrome. Launch occurred at 01:47:59 UTC on 29 August 2003.

== Docking ==
The spacecraft docked with the aft port of the Zvezda module at 03:40:45 UTC on 31 August. It remained docked for 150 days before undocking at 08:35:56 UTC on 28 January 2004 to make way for Progress M1-11. It was deorbited at 13:11 UTC on the same day. The spacecraft burned up in the atmosphere over the Pacific Ocean, with any remaining debris landing in the ocean at around 13:57:12 UTC.

Progress M-48 carried supplies to the International Space Station, including food, water and oxygen for the crew and equipment for conducting scientific research.

== See also ==
- List of Progress flights
- Uncrewed spaceflights to the International Space Station
