= Progress M1-3 =

Russian cargo spacecraft

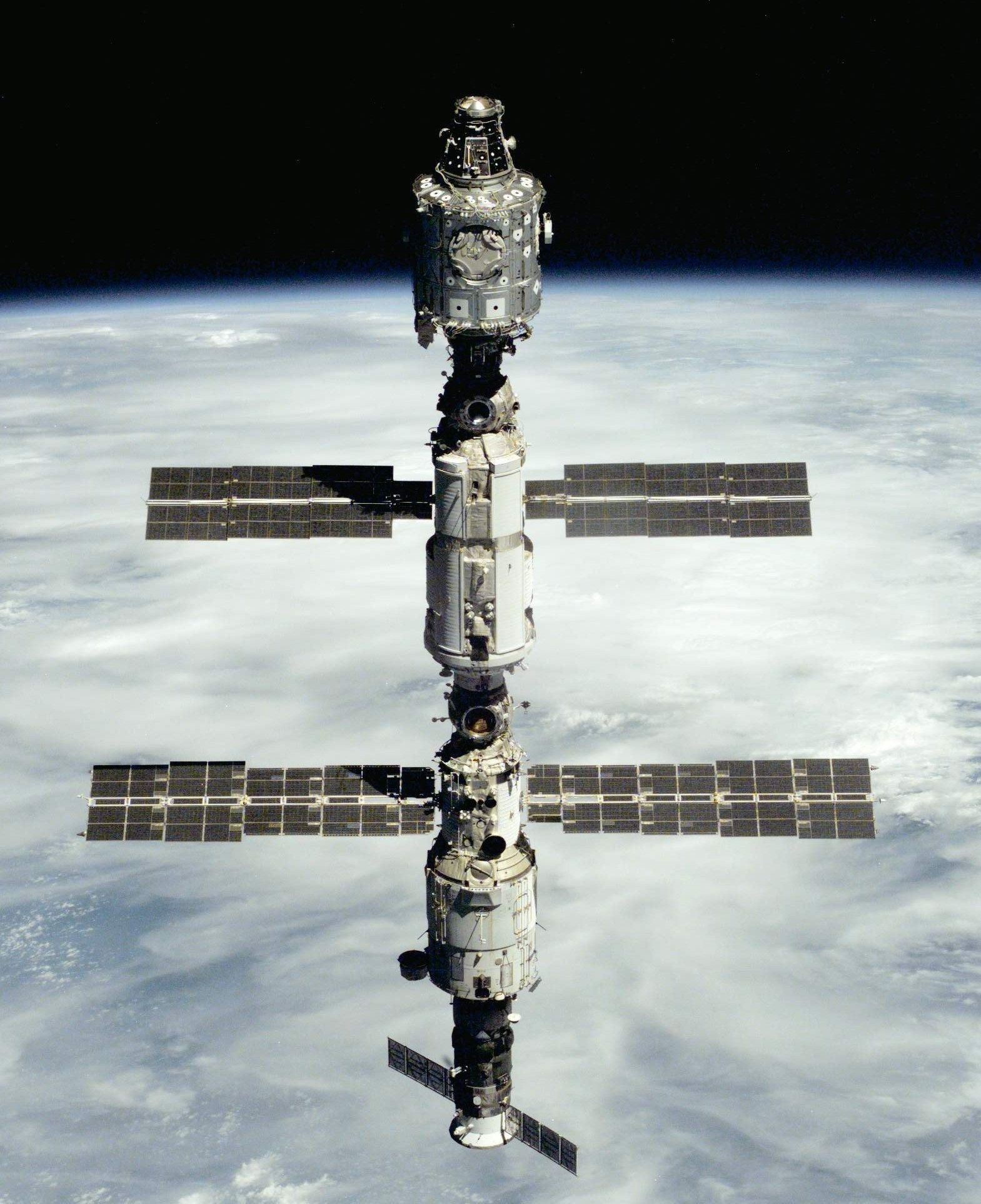
- The ISS as seen from STS-106, with Progress M1-3 spacecraft visible at the bottom
- Names: Progress 1 ISS 1P
- Mission type: ISS logistics
- Operator: Russian Space Agency
- COSPAR ID: 2000-044A
- SATCAT no.: 26461
- Mission duration: 86 days, 15 hours, 26 minutes

Spacecraft properties
- Spacecraft: Progress M1-3 No. 251
- Spacecraft type: Progress-M1 (11F615A55)
- Manufacturer: Energia

Start of mission
- Launch date: 6 August 2000, 18:26:42 UTC
- Rocket: Soyuz-U
- Launch site: Baikonur, Site 1/5
- Contractor: RKTs Progress

End of mission
- Disposal: Deorbited
- Decay date: 1 November 2000, 07:53:20 UTC

Orbital parameters
- Reference system: Geocentric
- Regime: Low Earth
- Perigee altitude: 357 km (222 mi)
- Apogee altitude: 369 km (229 mi)
- Inclination: 51.6°
- Period: 91.8 minutes
- Epoch: 6 August 2000

Docking with ISS
- Docking port: Zvezda aft
- Docking date: 8 August 2000, 20:12:56 UTC
- Undocking date: 1 November 2000, 04:04:49 UTC
- Time docked: 84 days, 7 hours, 51 minutes

Cargo
- Fuel: 260 kg (570 lb)

Progress M1-3, identified by NASA as Progress 1, was the first Progress spacecraft to visit the International Space Station. It was a Progress-M1 11F615A55 spacecraft, with the serial number 251.

== Launch ==
Progress M1-3 was launched by a Soyuz-U carrier rocket from Site 1/5 at the Baikonur Cosmodrome. Launch occurred at 18:26:42 UTC on 6 August 2000. The spacecraft docked with the aft port of the Zvezda module at 20:12:56 UTC on 8 August.

== Undocking ==
It remained docked for 75 days before undocking at 04:04:49 UTC on 1 November to make way for Soyuz TM-31. It was deorbited at 07:05:00 UTC on the same day. The spacecraft burned up in the atmosphere over the Pacific Ocean, with any remaining debris landing in the ocean at around 07:53:20 UTC.

Progress M1-3 carried supplies to the International Space Station. It was unloaded during the Space Shuttle missions STS-106 and STS-92, as the ISS did not yet have a permanent crew. The Expedition 1 crew arrived the day after Progress M1-3 departed the Station, using the docking port that it had vacated.

== See also ==
- List of Progress flights
- Uncrewed spaceflights to the International Space Station
