= Progress M1-11 =

Spacecraft

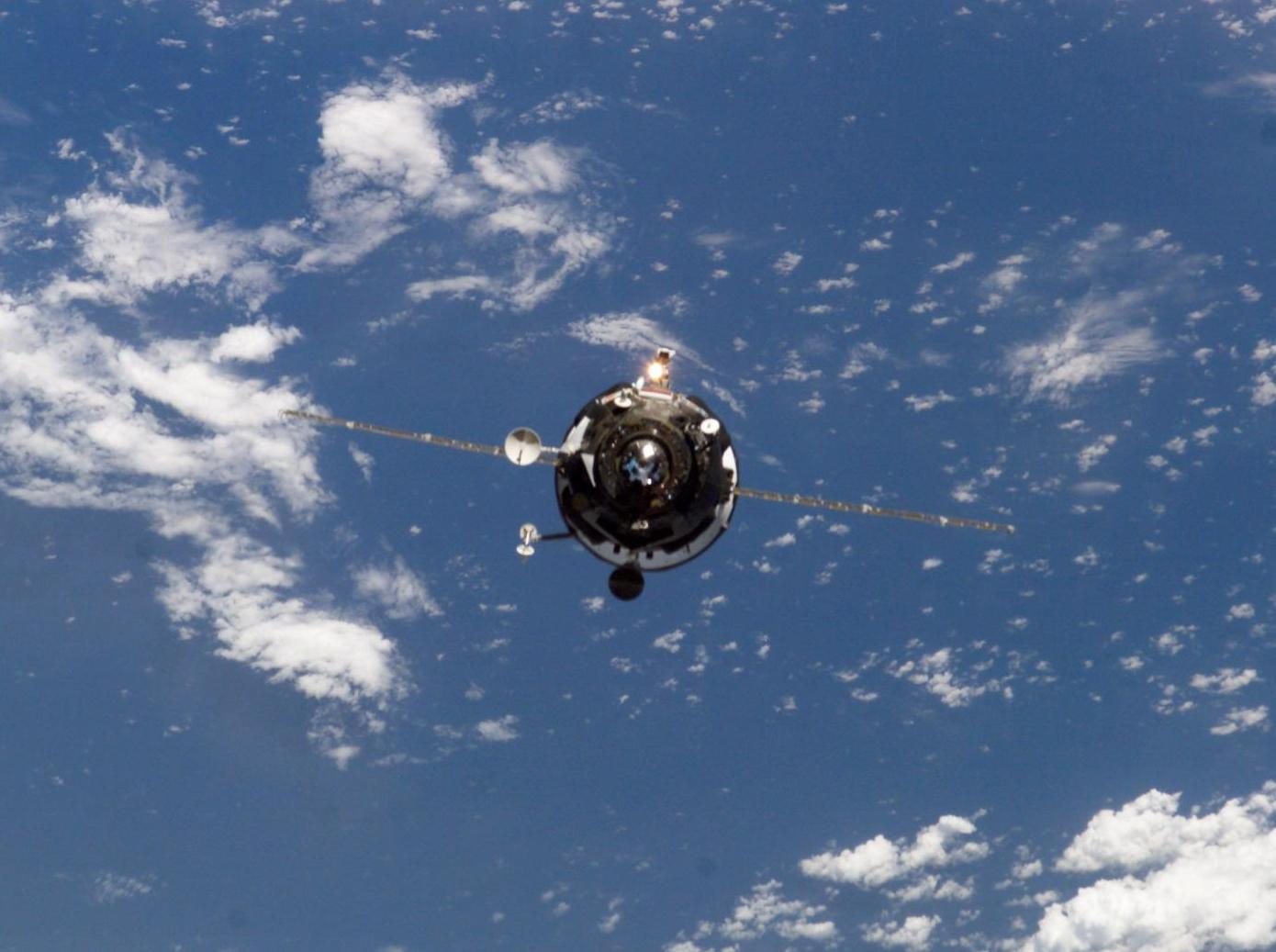
- Progress M1-11 approaching the ISS.
- Mission type: ISS resupply
- Operator: Roskosmos
- COSPAR ID: 2004-002A
- SATCAT no.: 28142
- Mission duration: 126 days

Spacecraft properties
- Spacecraft type: Progress-M1 s/n 260
- Manufacturer: RKK Energia

Start of mission
- Launch date: 29 January 2004, 11:58:08 UTC
- Rocket: Soyuz-U
- Launch site: Baikonur, Site 1/5

End of mission
- Disposal: Deorbited
- Decay date: 3 June 2004, 10:36:25 UTC

Orbital parameters
- Reference system: Geocentric
- Regime: Low Earth
- Perigee altitude: 190 km
- Apogee altitude: 260 km
- Inclination: 51.6°
- Period: 88.7 minutes
- Epoch: 29 January 2004

Docking with ISS
- Docking port: Zvezda aft
- Docking date: 31 January 2004, 13:13:11 UTC
- Undocking date: 24 May 2004, 09:19:29 UTC
- Time docked: 114 days

Cargo
- Mass: 2500 kg
- Progress ISS Resupply

Progress M1-11, identified by NASA as Progress 13P, was a Progress spacecraft used to resupply the International Space Station. It was a Progress-M1 11F615A55 spacecraft, with the serial number 260.

== Launch ==
Progress M1-11 was launched by a Soyuz-U carrier rocket from Site 1/5 at the Baikonur Cosmodrome. Launch occurred at 11:58:08 UTC on 29 January 2004.

== Docking ==
The spacecraft docked with the aft port of the Zvezda module at 13:13:11 UTC on 31 January 2004. It remained docked for 114 days before undocking at 09:19:29 UTC on 24 May 2004 to make way for Progress M-49. Following undocking, it remained in orbit for ten days, conducting tests of its attitude control system. It was deorbited at 09:50 UTC on 3 June 2004. The spacecraft burned up in the atmosphere over the Pacific Ocean, with any remaining debris landing in the ocean at around 10:36:25 UTC.

Progress M1-11 carried supplies to the International Space Station, including food, water and oxygen for the crew and equipment for conducting scientific research. Its cargo included an Orlan spacesuit, a replacement flex hose for the Destiny module, a new Elektron oxygen generator with spare parts for the Elektron already aboard the ISS, some oxygen generator candles, spare batteries, new fire detection and suppression systems, a gas analysis system, cameras, data cassettes, and an external experiment package for the Zvezda module, Matreshka. It was also used to perform a reboost manoeuvre shortly before its departure from the ISS.

It was the last Progress-M1 11F615A55 to be launched, with all subsequent flights until 2011 using the earlier Progress-M spacecraft. An updated Progress M1, serial number 11F615A70, was later canceled. Progress-M was eventually replaced by 11F615A60, which retained the Progress-M designation, beginning with Progress M-01M in 2008.

== See also ==
- List of Progress flights
- Uncrewed spaceflights to the International Space Station
