= Progress M-45 =

Russian cargo spacecraft

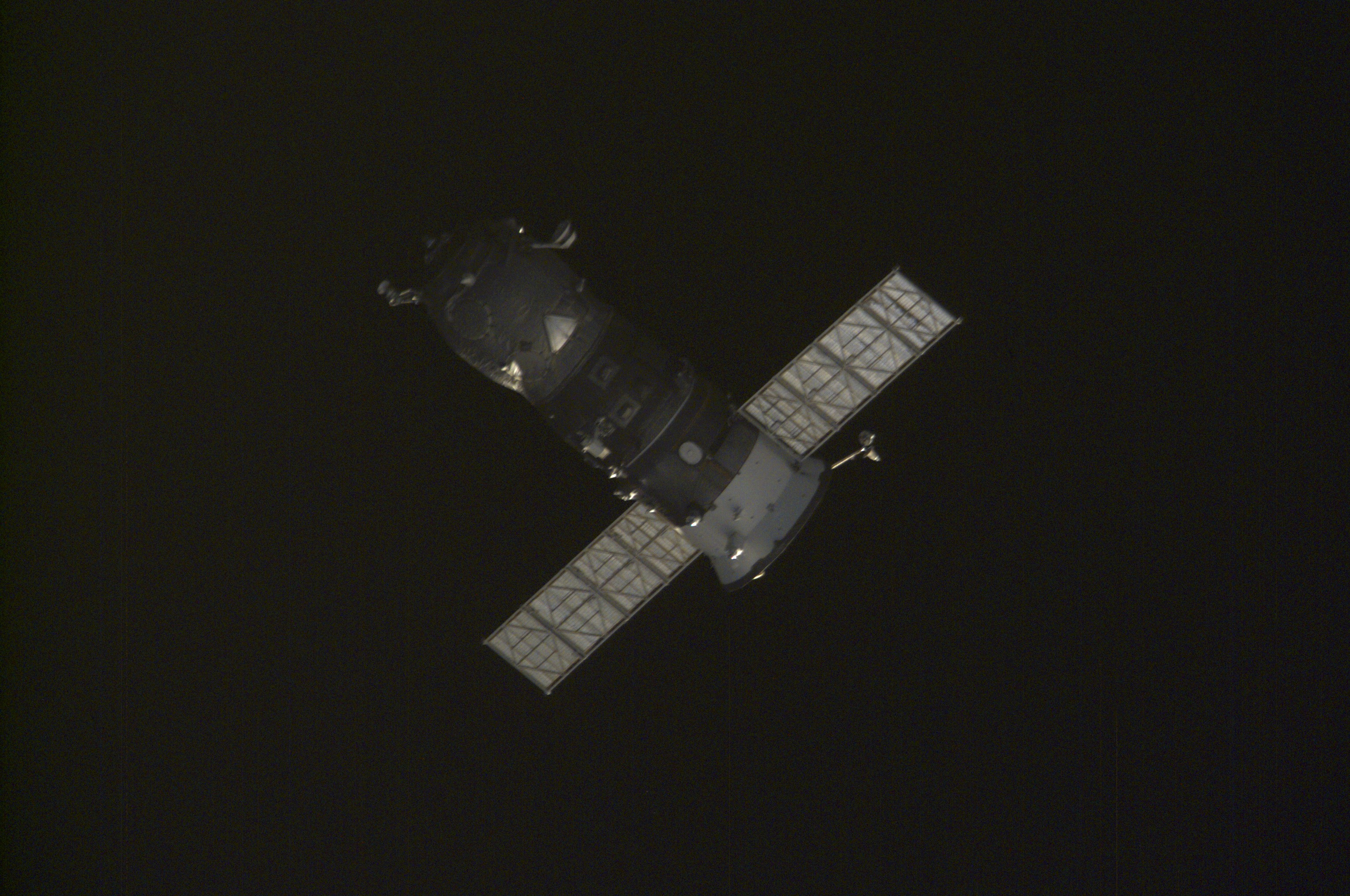
- Progress M-45 departing the ISS.
- Mission type: ISS resupply
- Operator: Roskosmos
- COSPAR ID: 2001-036A
- SATCAT no.: 26890
- Mission duration: 93 days

Spacecraft properties
- Spacecraft type: Progress-M s/n 245
- Manufacturer: RKK Energia

Start of mission
- Launch date: 21 August 2001, 09:23:54 UTC
- Rocket: Soyuz-U
- Launch site: Baikonur, Site 1/5

End of mission
- Disposal: Deorbited
- Decay date: 22 November 2001, 21:35:23 UTC

Orbital parameters
- Reference system: Geocentric
- Regime: Low Earth
- Perigee altitude: 193 km
- Apogee altitude: 145 km
- Inclination: 51.6°
- Period: 88.6 minutes
- Epoch: 21 August 2001

Docking with ISS
- Docking port: Zvezda aft
- Docking date: 23 August 2001, 09:51:32 UTC
- Undocking date: 22 November 2001, 16:12:01 UTC
- Time docked: 91 days

Cargo
- Mass: 2500 kg
- Progress ISS Resupply

Progress M-45 (Russian: Прогресс М-45), identified by NASA as Progress 5P, was a Progress spacecraft used to resupply the International Space Station. It was a Progress-M 11F615A55 spacecraft, with the serial number 245.

== Launch ==
Progress M-45 was launched by a Soyuz-U carrier rocket from Site 1/5 at the Baikonur Cosmodrome. Launch occurred at 09:23:54 UTC on 21 August 2001.

== Docking ==
The spacecraft docked with the aft port of the Zvezda module at 09:51:32 UTC on 23 August 2001.

It remained docked for 91 days before undocking at 16:12:01 UTC on 22 November 2001 to make way for Progress M1-7. It left debris on the docking port which prevented Progress M1-7 from achieving a hard dock until it was removed during an EVA on 3 December 2001. Progress M-45 was deorbited at 20:48:00 UTC on the same day that it undocked. The spacecraft burned up in the atmosphere over the Pacific Ocean, with any remaining debris landing in the ocean at around 21:35:23 UTC.

Progress M-45 carried supplies to the International Space Station, including food, water and oxygen for the crew and equipment for conducting scientific research.

== See also ==
- List of Progress flights
- Uncrewed spaceflights to the International Space Station
