= Soyuz-FG =

Launch vehicle

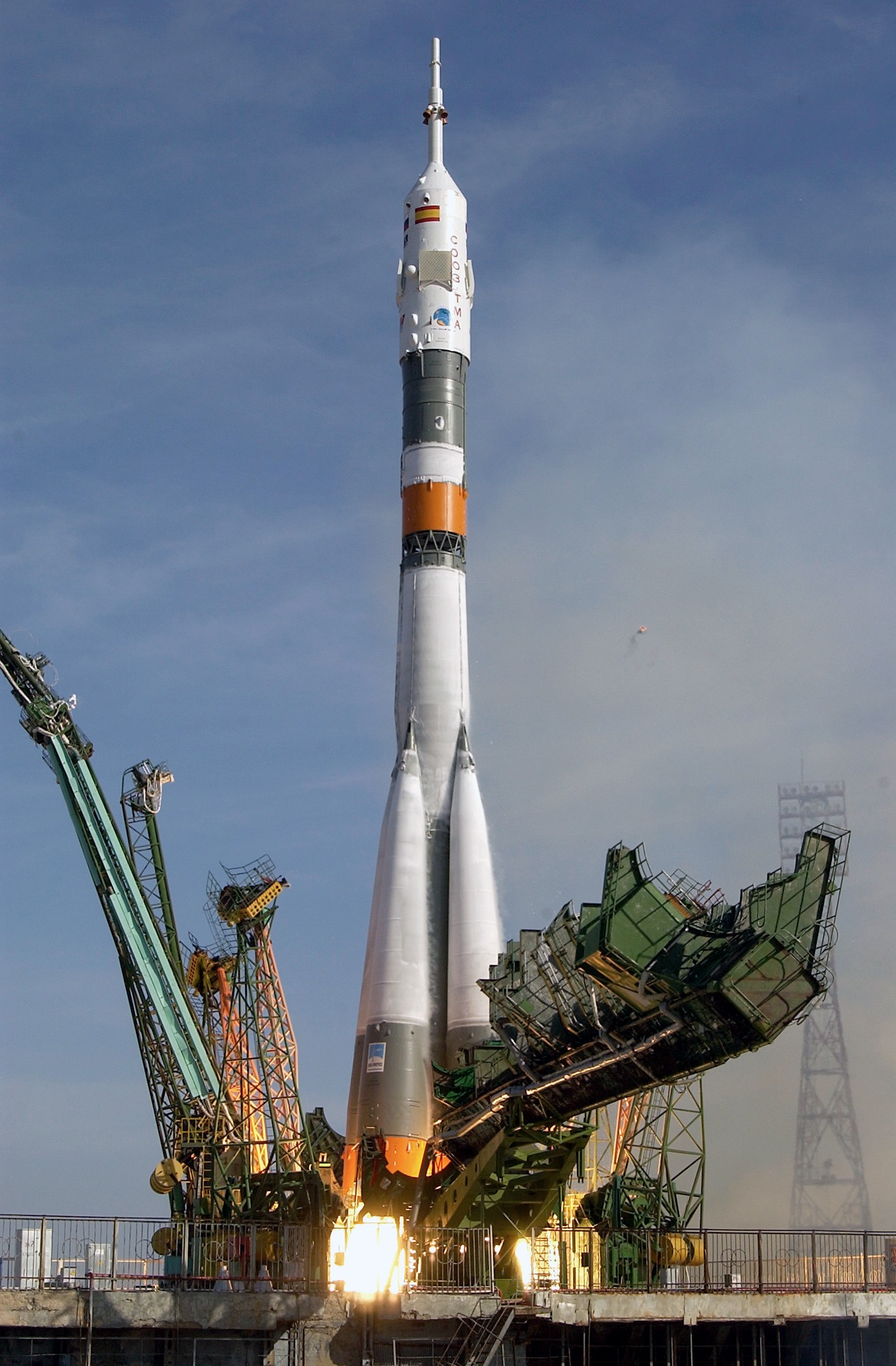
- The launch of Soyuz TMA-3 atop a Soyuz-FG rocket.
- Function: Medium-lift launch vehicle
- Manufacturer: RKTs Progress
- Country of origin: Russia
- Cost per launch: 773,600,000 ₽ (2012)

Size
- Height: 51 m (167 ft)
- Diameter: 2.7–3.715 m (8.86–12.19 ft)
- Mass: 310,000–313,000 kg (683,000–690,000 lb)
- Stages: FG: 3; FG/Fregat: 4

Capacity

Payload to LEO
- Altitude: 200 km (120 mi)
- Orbital inclination: 51.8°
- Mass: FG: 6,900 kg (15,200 lb); FG/Fregat: 7,800 kg (17,200 lb)

Associated rockets
- Family: R-7 (Soyuz)
- Based on: Soyuz-U
- Derivative work: Soyuz-2

Launch history
- Status: Retired
- Launch sites: Baikonur, LC-1/5 and LC-31/6
- Total launches: 70: FG: 60; FG/Fregat: 10
- Success(es): 69
- Failure: 1 (Soyuz MS-10)
- First flight: 20 May 2001 (Progress M1-6)
- Last flight: 25 September 2019 (Soyuz MS-15)
- Carries passengers or cargo: Soyuz-TMA; Soyuz-MS; Progress; Venus Express

Boosters (First stage) – Block B, V, G & D (Note: This is a transliteration of the second through fifth letters of the Cyrillic alphabet (Б, В, Г, Д). A sense-for-sense translation would correspond to the second through fifth letters of the Latin alphabet, 'Block B, C, D & E'.)
- Height: 19.6 m (64 ft)
- Diameter: 2.68 m (8 ft 10 in)
- Empty mass: 3,800 kg (8,400 lb)
- Gross mass: 43,400 kg (95,700 lb)
- Propellant mass: 40,350 kg (88,960 lb)
- Powered by: 1 × RD-107A
- Maximum thrust: SL: 838.5 kN (188,500 lb_{f}); vac: 1,021.3 kN (229,600 lb_{f})
- Specific impulse: SL: 263.3 s (2.582 km/s); vac: 320.2 s (3.140 km/s)
- Burn time: 118 seconds
- Propellant: LOX / RG-1

Second stage (core) – Block A
- Height: 27.1 m (89 ft)
- Diameter: 2.95 m (9 ft 8 in)
- Empty mass: 6,550 kg (14,440 lb)
- Gross mass: 99,500 kg (219,400 lb)
- Propellant mass: 92,600 kg (204,100 lb)
- Powered by: 1 × RD-108A
- Maximum thrust: SL: 792.41 kN (178,140 lb_{f}); vac: 921.86 kN (207,240 lb_{f})
- Specific impulse: SL: 257.7 s (2.527 km/s); vac: 320.6 s (3.144 km/s)
- Burn time: 286 seconds
- Propellant: LOX / RG-1

Third stage – Block I (Note: This is a transliteration of the tenth letter of the Cyrillic alphabet (И), which also carries the numerical value 10 in Cyrillic numerals. A sense-for-sense translation would use a Roman numeral, 'Block X'.)
- Height: 6.7 m (22 ft)
- Diameter: 2.66 m (8 ft 9 in)
- Empty mass: 2,410 kg (5,310 lb)
- Gross mass: 25,300 kg (55,800 lb)
- Propellant mass: 22,800 kg (50,300 lb)
- Powered by: 1 × RD-0110
- Maximum thrust: 297.93 kN (66,980 lb_{f})
- Specific impulse: 326 s (3.20 km/s)
- Burn time: 230 seconds
- Propellant: LOX / RG-1

Fourth stage (optional) – Fregat
- Height: 1.5 m (4 ft 11 in)
- Diameter: 3.35 m (11.0 ft)
- Empty mass: 930 kg (2,050 lb)
- Propellant mass: 5,250 kg (11,570 lb)
- Powered by: 1 × S5.92
- Maximum thrust: 19.85 kN (4,460 lb_{f})
- Specific impulse: 333.2 s (3.268 km/s)
- Burn time: Up to 1,100 seconds (up to 20 starts)
- Propellant: N_{2}O_{4} / UDMH

The Soyuz-FG was an improved variant of the Soyuz-U launch vehicle from the R-7 rocket family, developed by the Progress Rocket Space Centre in Samara, Russia. It featured upgraded first and second stage engines, RD-107A and RD-108A, respectively, with enhanced injector heads that improved combustion efficiency and specific impulse. The designation "FG" refers to forsunochnaya golovka (injector head) in Russian.

Soyuz-FG made its maiden flight on 20 May 2001, delivering a Progress cargo spacecraft to the International Space Station (ISS). It became the primary vehicle for launching crewed Soyuz TMA, Soyuz TMA-M, and Soyuz MS spacecraft from 2002 until its retirement in 2019.

Launches occurred from the Baikonur Cosmodrome in Kazakhstan: crewed missions from Gagarin's Start (Site 1/5) and satellite launches from Site 31/6.

== Design ==
Soyuz-FG was introduced in May 2001 as a transitional solution while the more advanced Soyuz-2 was still in development. Development of the upgraded RD-107A (boosters) and RD-108A (core) engines outpaced the rest of the Soyuz-2 rocket. The availability of the upgraded engines allowed their early use on Soyuz-FG, while Soyuz-U continued using existing engine stockpiles.

The RD-107A and RD-108A engines, replaced the older RD-107 and RD-108 units, switching from 260 two-component centrifugal injectors to over 1,000 one-component injectors. This refinement enabled more complete propellant combustion, reduced high-frequency vibrations in combustion chambers, and improved specific impulse by 5 seconds (0.049 km/s), a five percent improvement, which allowed for a payload increase of 250 to 300 kilograms (550 to 660 lb).

For uncrewed missions, Soyuz-FG could fly with a Fregat upper stage, built by Lavochkin in Khimki. The first flight of this configuration took place on 2 June 2003, with a total of ten such launches marketed by the European-Russian company Starsem.

Soyuz-FG flew 70 times, with one failure on 11 October 2018 during the launch of Soyuz MS-10. A faulty sensor led to a booster collision with the core stage shortly after liftoff, triggering an emergency abort. The crew—NASA astronaut Nick Hague and Russian cosmonaut Aleksey Ovchinin—safely returned to Earth.

Following the MS-15 launch on 25 September 2019, Soyuz-FG was retired in favor of the fully digital Soyuz-2, which offers more precise guidance and greater mission flexibility.

== Launch history ==
Date and time (UTC)	Configuration	Serial number	Launch site	Result	Payload	Remarks
20 May 2001; 22:32	Soyuz-FG	К15000-001	Baikonur, Site 1/5	Success	Progress M1-6	ISS resupply
26 November 2001; 18:24	Soyuz-FG	Ф15000-002	Baikonur, Site 1/5	Success	Progress M1-7	ISS resupply Kolibri 2000
25 September 2002; 16:58	Soyuz-FG	Э15000-003	Baikonur, Site 1/5	Success	Progress M1-9	ISS resupply
30 October 2002; 16:58	Soyuz-FG	Э15000-004	Baikonur, Site 1/5	Success	Soyuz TMA-1	Crewed flight with 3 cosmonauts ISS escape craft
26 April 2003; 03:53	Soyuz-FG	Э15000-006	Baikonur, Site 1/5	Success	Soyuz TMA-2	Crewed flight with 2 cosmonauts ISS Expedition 7
2 June 2003; 18:24	Soyuz-FG/Fregat	Э15000-005/ ST-11	Baikonur LC-31/6	Success	Mars Express	Mars orbiter
2 June 2003; 18:24	Soyuz-FG/Fregat	Э15000-005/ ST-11	Baikonur LC-31/6	Success	Beagle 2	Mars lander Spacecraft failed after landing
18 October 2003; 05:38	Soyuz-FG	Д15000-007	Baikonur, Site 1/5	Success	Soyuz TMA-3	Crewed flight with 3 cosmonauts ISS Expedition 8
27 December 2003; 21:30	Soyuz-FG/Fregat	Д15000-008/ ST-12	Baikonur, Site 31/6	Success	AMOS-2	Communications satellite
19 April 2004; 05:19	Soyuz-FG	Ж15000-009	Baikonur, Site 1/5	Success	Soyuz TMA-4	Crewed flight with 3 cosmonauts ISS Expedition 9
14 October 2004; 03:06	Soyuz-FG	Ж15000-012	Baikonur, Site 1/5	Success	Soyuz TMA-5	Crewed flight with 3 cosmonauts ISS Expedition 10
15 April 2005; 00:46	Soyuz-FG	Ж15000-014	Baikonur, Site 1/5	Success	Soyuz TMA-6	Crewed flight with 3 cosmonauts ISS Expedition 11
13 August 2005; 23:28	Soyuz-FG/Fregat	Ж15000-011/ ST-13	Baikonur, Site 31/6	Success	Galaxy 14	Communications satellite
1 October 2005; 03:54	Soyuz-FG	П15000-017	Baikonur, Site 1/5	Success	Soyuz TMA-7	Crewed flight with 3 cosmonauts ISS Expedition 12
9 November 2005; 03:33	Soyuz-FG/Fregat	Ж15000-010/ ST-14	Baikonur, Site 31/6	Success	Venus Express	Venus orbiter
28 December 2005; 05:19	Soyuz-FG/Fregat	П15000-015/ ST-15	Baikonur, Site 31/6	Success	GIOVE-A	Navigation satellite
30 March 2006; 02:30	Soyuz-FG	П15000-018	Baikonur, Site 1/5	Success	Soyuz TMA-8	Crewed flight with 3 cosmonauts ISS Expedition 13
18 September 2006; 04:08	Soyuz-FG	Ц15000-023	Baikonur, Site 1/5	Success	Soyuz TMA-9	Crewed flight with 3 cosmonauts ISS Expedition 14
7 April 2007; 17:31	Soyuz-FG	Ц15000-019	Baikonur, Site 1/5	Success	Soyuz TMA-10	Crewed flight with 3 cosmonauts ISS Expedition 15
29 May 2007; 20:31	Soyuz-FG/Fregat	Ц15000-021	Baikonur, Site 31/6	Success	Globalstar × 4	Communications satellites
10 October 2007; 13:22	Soyuz-FG	Ц15000-020	Baikonur, Site 1/5	Success	Soyuz TMA-11	Crewed flight with 3 cosmonauts ISS Expedition 16
20 October 2007; 20:12	Soyuz-FG/Fregat	Ц15000-022	Baikonur, Site 31/6	Success	Globalstar × 4	Communications satellites
14 December 2007; 13:17	Soyuz-FG/Fregat	Ц15000-025	Baikonur, Site 31/6	Success	RADARSAT-2	Earth observation
8 April 2008; 11:16	Soyuz-FG	Ш15000-024	Baikonur, Site 1/5	Success	Soyuz TMA-12	Crewed flight with 3 cosmonauts ISS Expedition 17; First South Korean in space.
26 April 2008; 22:16	Soyuz-FG/Fregat	П15000-016	Baikonur, Site 31/6	Success	GIOVE-B	Navigation satellite
12 October 2008; 07:01	Soyuz-FG	Ш15000-026	Baikonur, Site 1/5	Success	Soyuz TMA-13	Crewed flight with 3 cosmonauts ISS Expedition 18
26 March 2009; 11:49	Soyuz-FG	Ю15000-027	Baikonur, Site 1/5	Success	Soyuz TMA-14	Crewed flight with 3 cosmonauts ISS Expedition 19
27 May 2009; 10:34	Soyuz-FG	Ю15000-030	Baikonur, Site 1/5	Success	Soyuz TMA-15	Crewed flight with 3 cosmonauts ISS Expedition 20
30 September 2009; 07:14	Soyuz-FG	Б15000-029	Baikonur, Site 1/5	Success	Soyuz TMA-16	Crewed flight with 3 cosmonauts ISS Expedition 21
20 December 2009; 21:52	Soyuz-FG	Б15000-031	Baikonur, Site 1/5	Success	Soyuz TMA-17	Crewed flight with 3 cosmonauts ISS Expedition 22
2 April 2010; 04:04	Soyuz-FG	Ю15000-028	Baikonur, Site 1/5	Success	Soyuz TMA-18	Crewed flight with 3 cosmonauts ISS Expedition 23
15 June 2010; 21:35	Soyuz-FG	Б15000-032	Baikonur, Site 1/5	Success	Soyuz TMA-19	Crewed flight with 3 cosmonauts ISS Expedition 24
7 October 2010; 23:10	Soyuz-FG	Б15000-035	Baikonur, Site 1/5	Success	Soyuz TMA-01M	Crewed flight with 3 cosmonauts ISS Expedition 25
15 December 2010; 19:09	Soyuz-FG	Б15000-034	Baikonur, Site 1/5	Success	Soyuz TMA-20	Crewed flight with 3 cosmonauts ISS Expedition 26
4 April 2011; 22:18	Soyuz-FG	И15000-036	Baikonur, Site 1/5	Success	Soyuz TMA-21	Crewed flight with 3 cosmonauts ISS Expedition 27
7 June 2011; 20:12	Soyuz-FG	И15000-037	Baikonur, Site 1/5	Success	Soyuz TMA-02M	Crewed flight with 3 cosmonauts ISS Expedition 28
14 November 2011; 04:14	Soyuz-FG	И15000-038	Baikonur, Site 1/5	Success	Soyuz TMA-22	Crewed flight with 3 cosmonauts ISS Expedition 29
21 December 2011; 13:16	Soyuz-FG	Л15000-039	Baikonur, Site 1/5	Success	Soyuz TMA-03M	Crewed flight with 3 cosmonauts ISS Expedition 30/31
15 May 2012; 03:01	Soyuz-FG	Л15000-041	Baikonur, Site 1/5	Success	Soyuz TMA-04M	Crewed flight with 3 cosmonauts ISS Expedition 31/32
15 July 2012; 02:40	Soyuz-FG	Л15000-042	Baikonur, Site 1/5	Success	Soyuz TMA-05M	Crewed flight with 3 cosmonauts ISS Expedition 32/33
22 July 2012; 06:41	Soyuz-FG/Fregat	Б15000-033	Baikonur, Site 31/6	Success	Kanopus-V №1; BelKA-2; Zond-PP; TET-1; exactView 1	Earth observation and technology demonstration satellites
23 October 2012; 10:51	Soyuz-FG	Л15000-044	Baikonur, Site 31/6	Success	Soyuz TMA-06M	Crewed flight with 3 cosmonauts ISS Expedition 33/34
19 December 2012; 12:12	Soyuz-FG	Л15000-040	Baikonur, Site 1/5	Success	Soyuz TMA-07M	Crewed flight with 3 cosmonauts ISS Expedition 34/35
28 March 2013; 20:43	Soyuz-FG	Е15000-043	Baikonur, Site 1/5	Success	Soyuz TMA-08M	Crewed flight with 3 cosmonauts ISS Expedition 35/36
28 May 2013; 20:31	Soyuz-FG	Е15000-045	Baikonur, Site 1/5	Success	Soyuz TMA-09M	Crewed flight with 3 cosmonauts ISS Expedition 36/37
25 September 2013; 20:58	Soyuz-FG	Е15000-046	Baikonur, Site 1/5	Success	Soyuz TMA-10M	Crewed flight with 3 cosmonauts ISS Expedition 37/38
7 November 2013; 04:14	Soyuz-FG	Т15000-048	Baikonur, Site 1/5	Success	Soyuz TMA-11M	Crewed flight with 3 cosmonauts ISS Expedition 38/39
25 March 2014; 21:17	Soyuz-FG	Т15000-047	Baikonur, Site 1/5	Success	Soyuz TMA-12M	Crewed flight with 3 cosmonauts ISS Expedition 39/40
28 May 2014; 19:57	Soyuz-FG	Т15000-049	Baikonur, Site 1/5	Success	Soyuz TMA-13M	Crewed flight with 3 cosmonauts ISS Expedition 40/41
25 September 2014; 20:25	Soyuz-FG	Т15000-050	Baikonur, Site 1/5	Success	Soyuz TMA-14M	Crewed flight with 3 cosmonauts ISS Expedition 41/42
23 November 2014; 21:01	Soyuz-FG	T15000-051	Baikonur, Site 31/6	Success	Soyuz TMA-15M	Crewed flight with 3 cosmonauts ISS Expedition 42/43
27 March 2015; 19:42	Soyuz-FG	G15000-053	Baikonur, Site 1/5	Success	Soyuz TMA-16M	Crewed flight with 3 cosmonauts ISS Expedition 43/44
22 July 2015; 21:03	Soyuz-FG	G15000-052	Baikonur, Site 1/5	Success	Soyuz TMA-17M	Crewed flight with 3 cosmonauts ISS Expedition 44/45
2 September 2015; 04:38	Soyuz-FG	G15000-054	Baikonur, Site 1/5	Success	Soyuz TMA-18M	Crewed flight with 3 cosmonauts ISS Expedition 45/46
15 December 2015; 11:03	Soyuz-FG	G15000-055	Baikonur, Site 1/5	Success	Soyuz TMA-19M	Crewed flight with 3 cosmonauts ISS Expedition 46/47
18 March 2016; 21:26	Soyuz-FG	R15000-057	Baikonur, Site 1/5	Success	Soyuz TMA-20M	Crewed flight with 3 cosmonauts ISS Expedition 47/48
7 July 2016; 01:36	Soyuz-FG	R15000-056	Baikonur, Site 1/5	Success	Soyuz MS-01	Crewed flight with 3 cosmonauts ISS Expedition 48/49
19 October 2016; 08:05	Soyuz-FG	R15000-059	Baikonur, Site 31/6	Success	Soyuz MS-02	Crewed flight with 3 cosmonauts ISS Expedition 49/50
17 November 2016; 20:20	Soyuz-FG	R15000-060	Baikonur, Site 1/5	Success	Soyuz MS-03	Crewed flight with 3 cosmonauts ISS Expedition 50/51
20 April 2017; 07:13	Soyuz-FG	U15000-065	Baikonur, Site 1/5	Success	Soyuz MS-04	Crewed flight with 2 cosmonauts ISS Expedition 51/52
28 July 2017; 15:40	Soyuz-FG	R15000-058	Baikonur, Site 1/5	Success	Soyuz MS-05	Crewed flight with 3 cosmonauts ISS Expedition 52/53
12 September 2017; 21:17	Soyuz-FG	U15000-063	Baikonur, Site 1/5	Success	Soyuz MS-06	Crewed flight with 3 cosmonauts ISS Expedition 53/54
17 December 2017; 07:21	Soyuz-FG	R15000-061	Baikonur, Site 1/5	Success	Soyuz MS-07	Crewed flight with 3 cosmonauts ISS Expedition 54/55
21 March 2018; 17:44	Soyuz-FG	N15000-066	Baikonur, Site 1/5	Success	Soyuz MS-08	Crewed flight with 3 cosmonauts ISS Expedition 55/56
6 June 2018; 11:12	Soyuz-FG	U15000-064	Baikonur, Site 1/5	Success	Soyuz MS-09	Crewed flight with 3 cosmonauts ISS Expedition 56/57
11 October 2018; 08:40	Soyuz-FG	N15000-062	Baikonur, Site 1/5	Failure	Soyuz MS-10	Crewed flight with 2 cosmonauts Planned for ISS Expedition 57; Aborted during ascent; crew landed safely.
16 November 2018; 18:14	Soyuz-FG	N15000-068	Baikonur, Site 1/5	Success	Progress MS-10	ISS resupply
3 December 2018; 11:31	Soyuz-FG	N15000-067	Baikonur, Site 1/5	Success	Soyuz MS-11	Crewed flight with 3 cosmonauts ISS Expedition 57/58/59
14 March 2019; 19:14	Soyuz-FG	N15000-070	Baikonur, Site 1/5	Success	Soyuz MS-12	Crewed flight with 3 cosmonauts ISS Expedition 59/60
20 July 2019; 16:28	Soyuz-FG	N15000-069	Baikonur, Site 1/5	Success	Soyuz MS-13	Crewed flight with 3 cosmonauts ISS Expedition 60/61
25 September 2019; 13:57:43	Soyuz-FG	N15000-071	Baikonur, Site 1/5	Success	Soyuz MS-15	Crewed flight with 3 cosmonauts ISS Expedition 61/62; Last flight of Soyuz-FG variant, to be replaced by Soyuz-2 for future crewed missions.

== See also ==
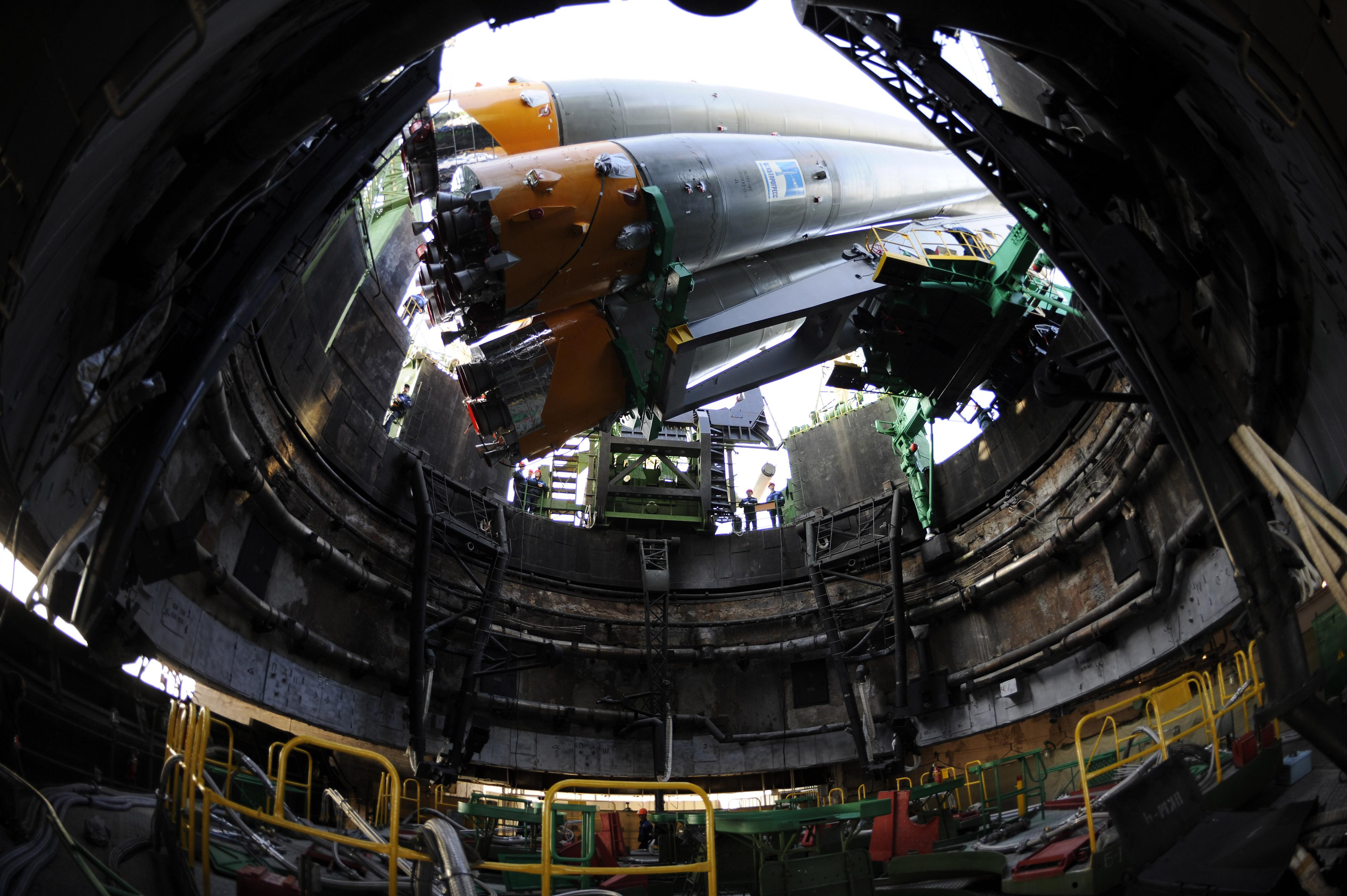
The Soyuz TMA-13 spacecraft arrives at the launch pad at the Baikonur Cosmodrome in Kazakhstan 10 October 2008.

- Soyuz (spacecraft)
- Soyuz programme
- Russian Federal Space Agency
- Starsem
