= Progress M-43 =

Russian cargo spacecraft

- A Progress-M spacecraft
- Mission type: Mir resupply
- COSPAR ID: 2000-064A
- SATCAT no.: 26570

Spacecraft properties
- Spacecraft: Progress (No.243)
- Spacecraft type: Progress-M
- Manufacturer: RKK Energia

Start of mission
- Launch date: 16 October 2000, 21:27:06 UTC
- Rocket: Soyuz-U
- Launch site: Baikonur, Site 1/5

End of mission
- Disposal: Deorbited
- Decay date: 29 January 2001, 01:04 UTC

Orbital parameters
- Reference system: Geocentric
- Regime: Low Earth
- Perigee altitude: 193 km
- Apogee altitude: 244 km
- Inclination: 51.6°
- Period: 88.4 minutes
- Epoch: 16 October 2000

Docking with Mir
- Docking port: Kvant-1 aft
- Docking date: 20 October 2000, 21:16:05 UTC
- Undocking date: 25 January 2001, 05:19:49 UTC
- Progress flights Progress Mir flights

Progress M-43 (Russian: Прогресс M-43) was a Russian unmanned Progress cargo spacecraft, which was launched in October 2000 to resupply the Mir space station.

== Launch ==
Progress M-43 launched on 16 October 2000 from the Baikonur Cosmodrome in Kazakhstan. It used a Soyuz-U rocket. The launch had been delayed from the previous day.

== Docking ==
Progress M-43 docked with Mir on 20 October 2000 at 21:16:05 UTC.

== Decay ==
It remained in orbit until 29 January 2001, when it was deorbited. The deorbit burn occurred at 02:12 UTC.

== See also ==
- 2000 in spaceflight
- List of Progress missions
- List of uncrewed spaceflights to Mir
