= Progress-M1 =

Russian spacecraft which is used to resupply space stations

Progress M1
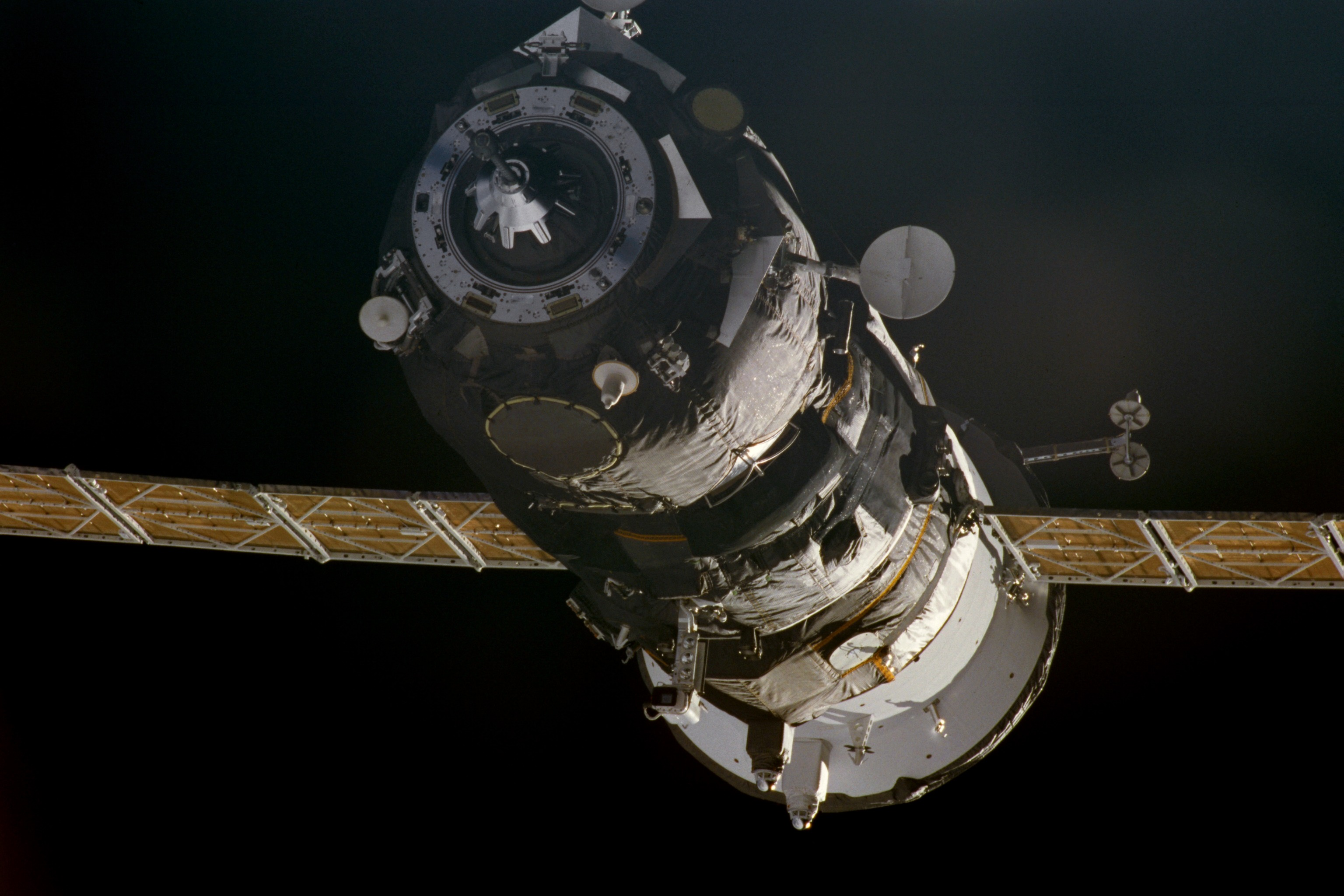
- Progress M1-4, seen from the ISS
- Manufacturer: Energia
- Country of origin: Russia
- Operator: Roscosmos
- Applications: Space station resupply

Specifications
- Spacecraft type: Cargo
- Dry mass: 5,050 kg (11,130 lb)
- Payload capacity: Launch: 2,500 kg (5,500 lb); Disposal: 1,600 kg (3,500 lb)
- Volume: 6.6 m^{3} (230 cu ft) in cargo section
- Regime: Low Earth orbit
- Design life: 180 days when docked to a space station

Production
- Status: Retired
- Built: 11
- Launched: 11
- Retired: 11
- Maiden launch: 1 February 2000 (M1-1)
- Last launch: 29 January 2004 (M1-11)
- Last retirement: 3 June 2004 (M1-11)

Related spacecraft
- Derived from: Progress M

Configuration

Progress M1 (Russian: Прогресс М1, GRAU: 11F615A55), also known as Progress 7K-TGM1, is a Russian uncrewed cargo spacecraft used to resupply space stations. It is a variant of the Progress spacecraft derived from the Progress M, modified to carry increased quantities of UDMH fuel and N_{2}O_{4} oxidizer for refueling the International Space Station (ISS). The Progress M1 entered service in 2000 and was retired from regular service in 2004. A further upgraded variant, the Progress M1-M (GRAU: 11F615A70), incorporating the digital flight control system from the Progress M-M was planned but canceled before entering service.

The design reflected the needs of ISS logistics at the time, as the Space Shuttle provided large-capacity delivery of dry cargo and water but could not transport the hypergolic propellants required for the station's propulsion system. However, following the Space Shuttle Columbia disaster in 2003 and the subsequent grounding of the Shuttle fleet, ISS resupply priorities shifted toward increased delivery of dry cargo and water, as Progress became the primary cargo vehicle, contributing to the type’s retirement in 2004.

== Design ==
The design reflected ISS logistics requirements at the time, as the Space Shuttle provided large-capacity delivery of dry cargo and water but could not transport the hypergolic propellants required for the station's propulsion system. To address this, Energia reconfigured the spacecraft’s tanker section to increase propellant capacity, adding additional fuel tanks by relocating drinking water storage to the forward cargo module and nitrogen–oxygen gas storage to twelve small external tanks mounted around the interface between the cargo and tanker sections.

Progress M1 could carry up to 1,950 kilograms (4,300 lb) of propellant in eight mid-section tanks, compared to 850 kilograms (1,870 lb) for a Progress M of the same generation. The forward pressurized cargo module could carry up to 1,800 kilograms (4,000 lb) of supplies in 6.6 cubic metres (230 cu ft) of space, including up to 40 kilograms (88 lb) of compressed air, although the combined mass of cargo and propellant was limited to 2,500 kilograms (5,500 lb). The spacecraft had a tare weight of 5,050 kilograms (11,130 lb), and its KTDU-80 engine, producing 2,950 newtons (660 lb_{f}) of thrust, used up to 892 kilograms (1,967 lb) of propellant for maneuvers, with 185 to 250 kilograms (408 to 551 lb) typically remaining available for station use.

The first Progress M1 spacecraft launched on 1 February 2000 to Mir, while the first ISS mission, Progress M1-3, launched on 6 August 2000. A total of 11 spacecraft were flown, the last being Progress M1-11 in June 2004, after which the type was retired. Ten conducted standard resupply missions, while Progress M1-5 was used to deorbit Mir in 2001.

The Progress M1-M was a proposed modernized variant featuring digital flight control systems, similar to upgrades introduced on the Progress M-M spacecraft. The type was scheduled to debut as Progress M1-01M in 2011, but the program was canceled.

Progress M1 spacecraft were launched on Soyuz rockets. Eight flew on Soyuz-U, while three (M1-6, M1-7, and M1-9) launched on Soyuz-FG. The planned M1-M variant was expected to launch on Soyuz-2.

== Specifications (Progress M1) ==
Data from

- Dry mass: 5,050 kilograms (11,130 lb)
- Total payload capacity at launch: 2,500 kilograms (5,500 lb) – the following amounts exceed this capacity, giving planners the ability to match the payload to the needs of the station
  - Dry cargo (in cargo section): Up to 1,800 kilograms (4,000 lb) in 6.6 cubic metres (230 cu ft)
  - Propellant: Up to 1,700 kilograms (3,700 lb)
  - Water: Up to 300 kilograms (660 lb) in cargo section
  - Gases: Up to 40 kilograms (88 lb) in cargo section
- Total payload capacity (in cargo section) for disposal: 1,600 kilograms (3,500 lb)

== See also ==
- Automated Transfer Vehicle
- Cygnus spacecraft
- SpaceX Dragon
