= Progress M-09M =

Russian spacecraft

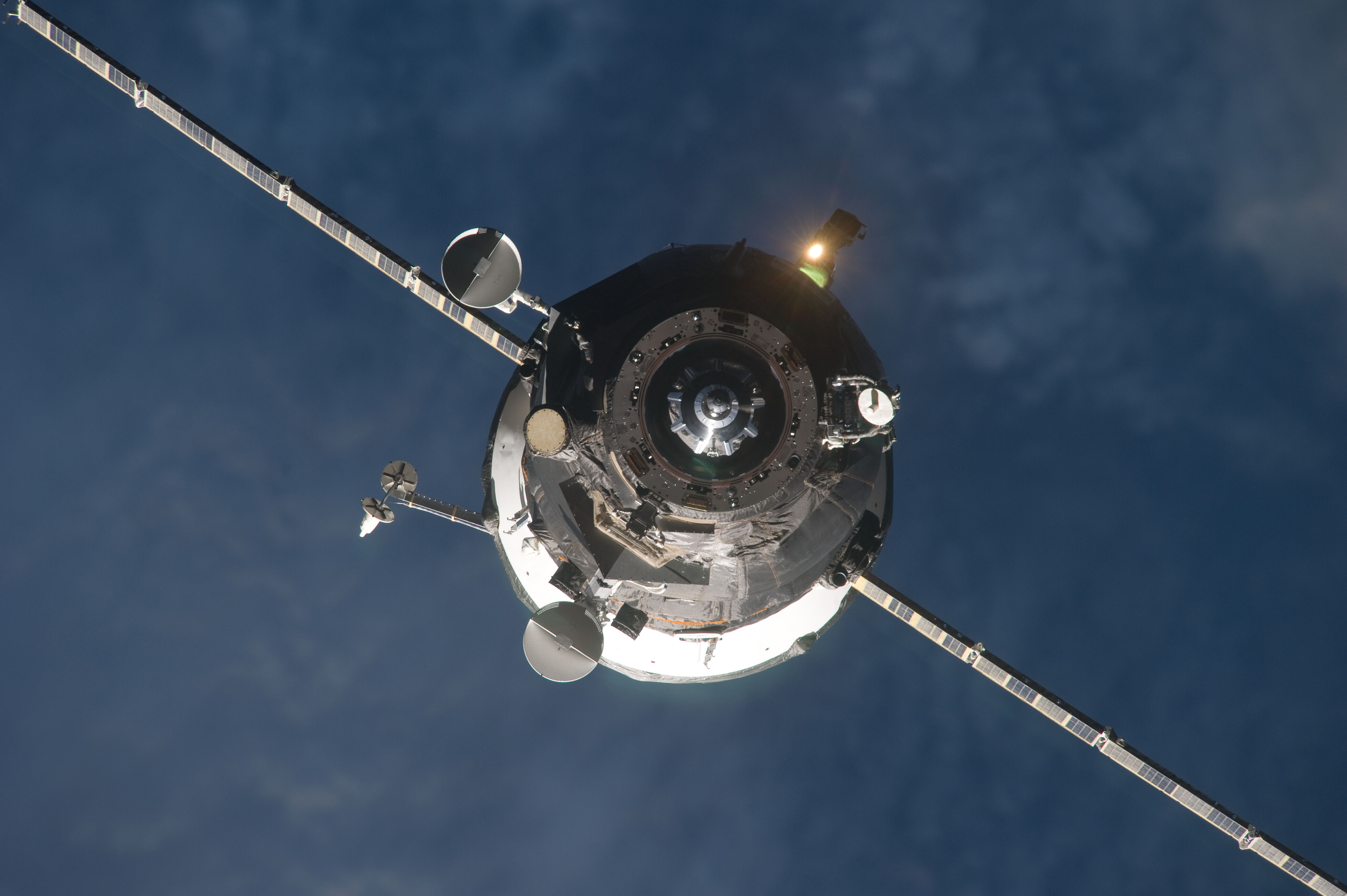
- Progress M-09M approaches the ISS on 29 January 2011.
- Mission type: ISS resupply
- Operator: Roskosmos
- COSPAR ID: 2011-004A
- SATCAT no.: 37359
- Mission duration: 88 days

Spacecraft properties
- Spacecraft type: Progress-M s/n 409
- Manufacturer: RKK Energia

Start of mission
- Launch date: 28 January 2011, 01:31:39 UTC
- Rocket: Soyuz-U
- Launch site: Baikonur, Site 1/5

End of mission
- Disposal: Deorbited
- Decay date: 26 April 2011, 13:23 UTC

Orbital parameters
- Reference system: Geocentric
- Regime: Low Earth
- Perigee altitude: 260 km
- Apogee altitude: 301 km
- Inclination: 51.65°
- Period: 90.12 minutes
- Epoch: 28 January 2011

Docking with ISS
- Docking port: Pirs Nadir
- Docking date: 30 January 2011, 02:39 UTC
- Undocking date: 22 April 2011, 12:38 UTC
- Time docked: 82 days

Cargo
- Mass: 2666 kg
- Pressurised: 1444 kg (dry cargo)
- Fuel: 752 kg
- Gaseous: 50 kg (oxygen)
- Water: 420 kg
- Progress ISS Resupply

Progress M-09M (Russian: Прогресс М-09М), identified by NASA as Progress 41P, is a Progress spacecraft which was launched in 2011 to resupply the International Space Station. It was the ninth Progress-M 11F615A60 spacecraft to be launched, and has the serial number 409. The spacecraft was manufactured by RKK Energia, and is operated by the Russian Federal Space Agency. It arrived at the space station during Expedition 26, and undocked during Expedition 27.

== Launch and docking ==
Progress M-09M was launched from Pad 1/5 at the Baikonur Cosmodrome, on 28 January 2011 at 01:31:39 UTC. The launch used a Soyuz-U carrier rocket, which placed the Progress spacecraft into a low Earth orbit with a perigee of 193.5 kilometres (120.2 mi) and an apogee of 254.6 kilometres (158.2 mi), inclined at 51.65°. The Progress spacecraft subsequently raised its orbit, and manoeuvred to rendezvous with the space station. It arrived at the ISS on 30 January 2011, successfully docking to the nadir port of the Pirs at 02:39 UTC.

== Cargo ==
Progress M-09M is carrying 2,666 kilograms (5,878 lb) of cargo to the space station, consisting of 1,444 kilograms (3,183 lb) of dry cargo, 752 kilograms (1,658 lb) of propellant, 50 kilograms (110 lb) of oxygen and 420 kilograms (930 lb) of water. Of the fuel aboard the spacecraft, 250 kilograms (550 lb) are reserved for orbital manoeuvres whilst docked, such as raising or lowering the station's orbit, whilst the remaining 502 kilograms (1,107 lb) will be used for refuelling the station itself.

The dry cargo aboard Progress M-09M includes parts for the oxygen and water supply systems and the thermal control system, as well as equipment for hardware control and the station's electrical and telemetry systems. Also aboard the spacecraft is 147 kilograms (324 lb) of equipment for conducting scientific research aboard the station. For the crew, food, medical and hygiene equipment will also be delivered, as well as documentation and personal items including books by Konstantin Tsiolkovsky and a birthday present for station commander Scott Kelly.

The ARISSAT-1 or Kedr of 30 kg, miniaturised satellite was delivered to the ISS aboard Progress M-09M. It is an amateur radio satellite which will be deployed from the station during an EVA on 16 February 2011. The satellite will be operated by RSC Energia, and is part of the RadioSkaf programme. It is intended to commemorate the fiftieth anniversary of the Vostok 1 mission.

=== Inventory ===
Total cargo mass delivered: 2666 kg.

Item description	Mass (kg)
Propellant in the propulsion system tanks for the ISS needs	250
Propellant in the refuelling system tanks	502
Oxygen	50
Water in the Rodnik system tanks	420
Items in the cargo compartment	1444
Gas supply system	7
Water supply system	106
Thermal control system	9
On-board hardware control system	4
Electrical power supply system	77
Telemetry data system (BITS2-12)	1
Maintenance and repair equipment	4
Sanitary and hygienic items	71
Food containers, fresh products	222
Medical equipment, linen, personal hygienic and prophylactics items	106
Russian crew's hardware	138
Science experimental hardware, including hardware for Photon-Gamma, Typology, SVCh-radiometria, Biodegradation, Kedr satellite, experimental items	147
On-board documentation files, crew provisions, video- and photo-equipment	23
MRM-1 hardware	16
Soyuz TMA-M hardware	2
SM-hardware	2
MRM-2- hardware	5
FGB-hardware	140
US Orbital Segment hardware	371

== Undocking and deorbit ==
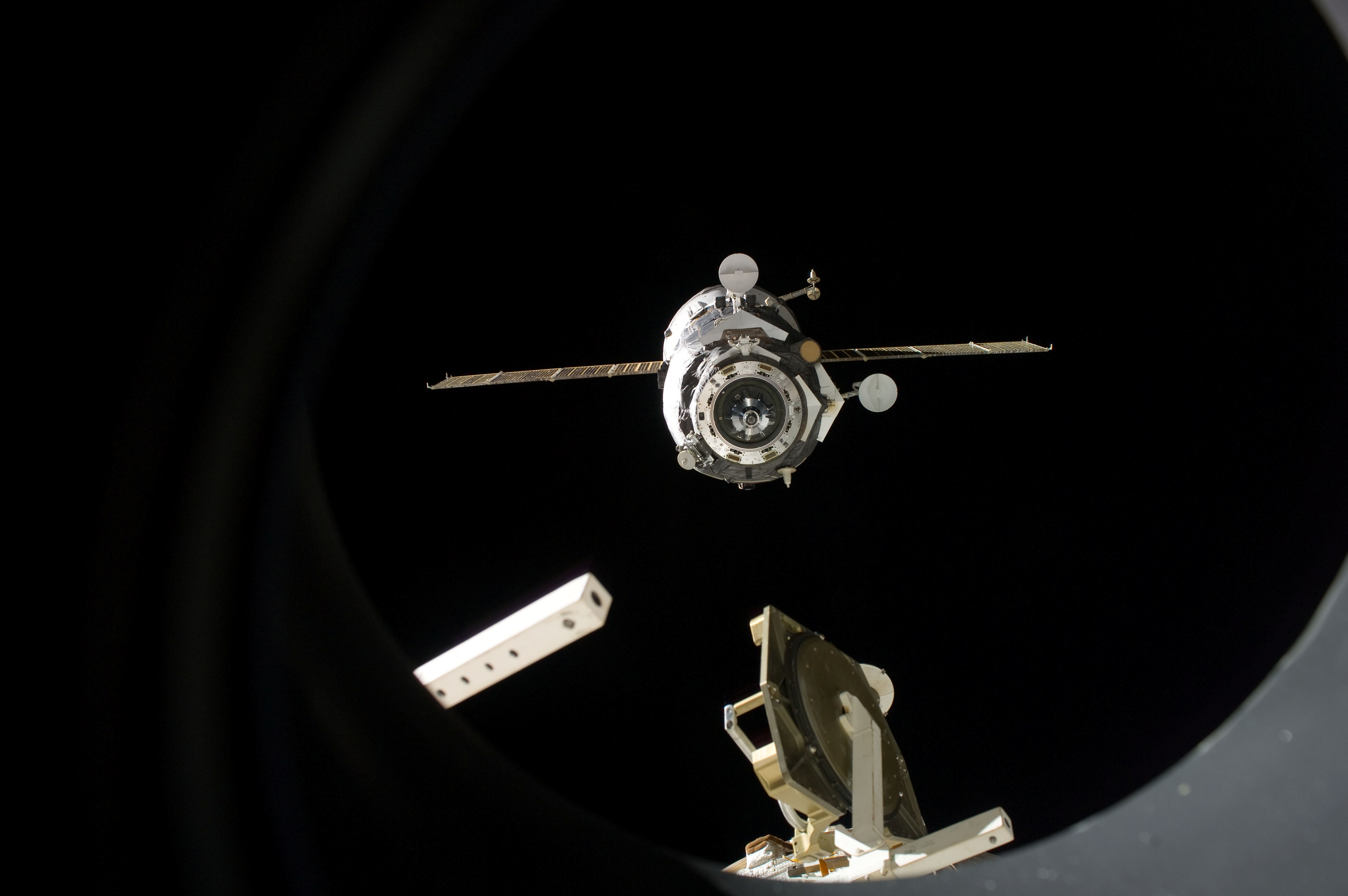
Progress M-09M departs the ISS on 22 April 2011.

Progress M-09M was undocked from the Pirs module at 11:41 UTC on 22 April 2011. After departing the space station, the spacecraft was used for Radar-Progress scientific experiment to investigate a reflection feature of the plasma generated by operations of the Progress propulsion. Upon the completion of this experiment the spacecraft was deorbited, and reentered over the "spacecraft cemetery" in the South Pacific Ocean. The deorbit manoeuvre was performed on 26 April 2011, with debris falling into the ocean at 13:23 UTC.

== See also ==
- 2011 in spaceflight
- List of Progress flights
- Uncrewed spaceflights to the International Space Station
