= Progress MS-05 =

2017 Russian resupply spaceflight to the ISS

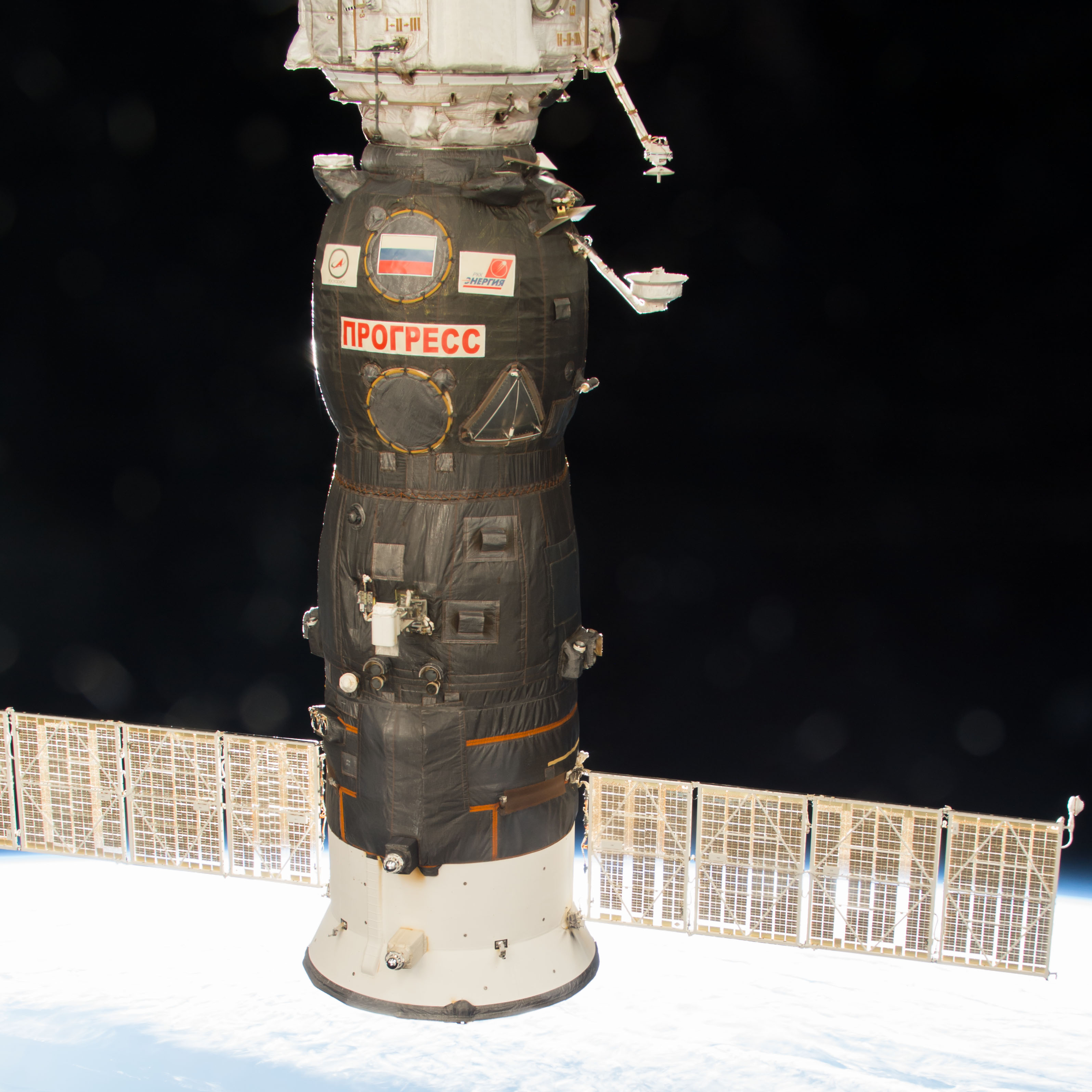
- Progress MS-05 docked at the ISS
- Names: Progress 66P
- Mission type: ISS resupply
- Operator: Roscosmos
- COSPAR ID: 2017-010A
- SATCAT no.: 42056
- Mission duration: 148 days

Spacecraft properties
- Spacecraft: Progress MS
- Spacecraft type: Progress MS-05 s/n 435
- Manufacturer: Energia
- Launch mass: 7281 kg
- Payload mass: 2640 kg

Start of mission
- Launch date: 22 February 2017, 05:58:33 UTC
- Rocket: Soyuz-U (s/n T15000-145)
- Launch site: Baikonur, Site 1/5
- Contractor: RKTs Progress

End of mission
- Disposal: Deorbited
- Decay date: 20 July 2017

Orbital parameters
- Reference system: Geocentric orbit
- Regime: Low Earth orbit
- Inclination: 51.66°

Docking with ISS
- Docking port: Pirs
- Docking date: 24 February 2017, 08:34 UTC
- Undocking date: 20 July 2017, 17:46 UTC
- Time docked: 146 days

Cargo
- Mass: 2640 kg
- Pressurised: 1317 kg
- Fuel: 880 kg
- Gaseous: 23 kg
- Water: 420 kg

Progress MS-05 (Russian: Прогресс МC-05), identified by NASA as Progress 66P, was a Progress spaceflight operated by Roscosmos to resupply the International Space Station (ISS).

== History ==
The Progress MS is a uncrewed freighter based on the Progress-M featuring improved avionics. This improved variant first launched on 21 December 2015. It had the following improvements:

- New external compartment that enables it to deploy satellites. Each compartment can hold up to four launch containers. First time installed on Progress MS-03.
- Enhanced redundancy thanks to the addition of a backup system of electrical motors for the docking and sealing mechanism.
- Improved Micrometeoroid (MMOD) protection with additional panels in the cargo compartment.
- Luch Russian relay satellites link capabilities enable telemetry and control even when not in direct view of ground radio stations.
- GNSS autonomous navigation enables real time determination of the status vector and orbital parameters dispensing with the need of ground station orbit determination.
- Real time relative navigation thanks to direct radio data exchange capabilities with the space station.
- New digital radio that enables enhanced TV camera view for the docking operations.
- The Ukrainian Chezara Kvant-V on board radio system and antenna/feeder system has been replaced with a Unified Command Telemetry System (UCTS).
- Replacement of the Kurs A with Kurs NA digital system.

== Pre-launch ==
The launch of the Progress MS-05 mission was originally planned for 16 October 2016, and by the end of 2016, it was postponed to 21 February 2017, in the wake of the Progress MS-04 accident. The extra time was used to return the third stages of already assembled vehicles to the manufacturing plant for additional inspections of RD-0110 engines, which were suspected in the loss of Progress MS-04. The engine on the third stage of the Soyuz-U vehicle assigned for the Progress MS-05 mission was replaced.

The Soyuz-U rocket for the Progress MS-05 mission and all subsequent launchers carrying Soyuz and Progress spacecraft were retrofitted with onboard cameras capable of transmitting live images during the ascent to orbit. The cameras were installed on the exterior of the intertank compartment of the third stage. The resulting video could help to understand the rocket's behavior during the flight.

The launch of Progress MS-05 was to be ensured for 139.8 million rubles.

== Cargo ==
The Progress MS-06 spacecraft delivered 2,640 kg of cargo and supplies to the International Space Station, including an Orlan-MKS spacesuit. This was a replacement for the suit lost on Progress MS-04. The following is a breakdown of cargo bound for the ISS:

- Orlon-MKS space suit: 156 kg
- Fuel: 880 kg
- Oxygen and air: 51 kg
- Water: 420 kg

== Launch ==
Progress MS-05 was launched on 22 February 2017 at 05:58:33 UTC from the Baikonur Cosmodrome in Kazakhstan. It used the 786th and last Soyuz-U rocket.

== Docking ==
Progress MS-05 docked with the Pirs module at 08:34 UTC on 24 February 2017. During the automated docking process, Russian cosmonauts Sergey Ryzhikov and Oleg Novitsky were on stand by at the manual control system, TORU, console inside the Pirs service module to take over docking operations if needed. Progress MS-05 will remain docked at the station for almost four months before departing in June 2017 for its deorbit into Earth's atmosphere.

== Undocking and decay ==
After six months at the International Space Station, the Progress MS-05 cargo ship undocked from the Pirs, on 20 July 2017, at 17:46 UTC. The three-minute braking manoeuvre with the main engine of the cargo ship was scheduled to begin at 20:58 UTC, followed by reentry into the dense atmosphere at 21:32 UTC on 20 July 2017. Surviving debris of the spacecraft were calculated to impact the remote area of the Pacific Ocean at 21:41 UTC on 21 July 2017.
