= Progress M-01M =

Russian spacecraft

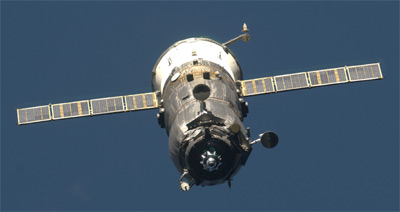
- Progress M-01M seen from the ISS.
- Mission type: ISS resupply
- Operator: Roskosmos
- COSPAR ID: 2008-060A
- SATCAT no.: 33443
- Mission duration: 74 days

Spacecraft properties
- Spacecraft type: Progress-M s/n 401
- Manufacturer: RKK Energia

Start of mission
- Launch date: 26 November 2008, 12:38 UTC
- Rocket: Soyuz-U
- Launch site: Baikonur, Site 1/5

End of mission
- Disposal: Deorbited
- Decay date: 8 February 2009, 08:20 UTC

Orbital parameters
- Reference system: Geocentric
- Regime: Low Earth
- Perigee altitude: 151.15 km
- Apogee altitude: 205.80 km
- Inclination: 51.6°
- Period: 88.00 minutes
- Epoch: 26 November 2008

Docking with ISS
- Docking port: Pirs
- Docking date: 30 November 2008, 12:28 UTC
- Undocking date: 6 February 2009, 04:10 UTC
- Time docked: 68 days

Cargo
- Mass: 2423 kg
- Pressurised: 1343 kg (dry cargo)
- Fuel: 820 kg
- Water: 210 kg
- Progress ISS Resupply

Progress M-01M (Russian: Прогресс М-01М), identified by NASA as Progress 31P, was a Progress spacecraft used to resupply the International Space Station. It was the first flight of the Progress-M 11F615A60, which featured a TsVM-101 digital flight computer and MBITS digital telemetry system, in place of the earlier analogue systems. It was the first Progress-M 11F615A60 spacecraft, and had the serial number 401.

== Launch ==
It was launched at 12:38 UTC on 26 November 2008 from Site 1/5 at the Baikonur Cosmodrome in Kazakhstan, atop a Soyuz-U carrier rocket. Following a four-day free flight, it docked with Pirs module of the ISS at 12:28 UTC on 30 November 2008.

== Antenna problem ==
Immediately after launch, an antenna used by the spacecraft's Kurs docking system failed to deploy. The antenna was successfully deployed about three hours later after flight controllers resent the deployment command, however the spacecraft was docked using the backup TORU system, controlled by cosmonaut Yury Lonchakov, as a precaution.

== Docking ==
It remained docked until 6 February 2009, when it undocked at 04:10 UTC. It subsequently spent two days in free flight, before being deorbited, and burning up in the atmosphere at 08:19 UTC on 8 February 2009.

== Cargo ==
Progress M-01M carried 2,423 kilograms (5,342 lb) of cargo, consisting of which 820 kilograms (1,810 lb) of fuel, 210 kilograms (460 lb) of water, and 1,343 kilograms (2,961 lb) of dry cargo. The dry cargo included Japanese food for Koichi Wakata, who arrived aboard the station in March 2009 as part of Expedition 18.

== See also ==
- List of Progress flights
- Uncrewed spaceflights to the International Space Station
