= Progress M-67 =

Russian cargo spacecraft

- Mission type: ISS resupply
- Operator: Roskosmos
- COSPAR ID: 2009-040A
- SATCAT no.: 35641
- Mission duration: 65 days

Spacecraft properties
- Spacecraft type: Progress s/n 367
- Manufacturer: RKK Energia

Start of mission
- Launch date: 24 July 2009, 10:56:56 UTC
- Rocket: Soyuz-U
- Launch site: Baikonur, Site 1/5

End of mission
- Disposal: Deorbited
- Decay date: 27 September 2009

Orbital parameters
- Reference system: Geocentric
- Regime: Low Earth
- Inclination: 51.6°
- Epoch: 24 July 2009

Docking with ISS
- Docking port: Zvezda aft
- Docking date: 29 July 2009, 11:12 UTC
- Undocking date: 21 September 2009, 07:25 UTC
- Time docked: 54 days

Cargo
- Mass: 2300 kg
- Pressurised: 1200 kg (dry cargo)
- Fuel: 830 kg
- Gaseous: 50 kg (oxygen)
- Progress ISS Resupply

Progress M-67 (Russian: Прогресс М-67) was a Progress spacecraft which was used for the Progress 34P flight to resupply the International Space Station. It was a Progress-M 11F615A55 spacecraft, with the serial number 367. Its flight to the ISS marked the final flight of the Progress-M 11F615A55 model, which was retired in favour of the modernised Progress-M 11F615A60.

== Launch ==
It was successfully launched aboard a Soyuz-U carrier rocket flying from Site 1/5 at the Baikonur Cosmodrome at 10:56:56 UTC on 24 July 2009.

== Docking ==
It was originally scheduled to dock with the ISS on 26 July 2009, two days after launch, but following delays to the launch of OV 105 on mission STS-127, it was decided before launch to extend the free flight period to allow the Shuttle to remain docked for the full duration of its mission. Although the Shuttle and Progress spacecraft do not use the same docking port on the ISS, a Progress cannot dock or undock whilst a Shuttle is docked to the station. Following Endeavour's departure on 28 July 2009, Progress M-67 docked to the aft docking port of the Zvezda module on 29 July 2009 at 11:12 UTC after five days of free flight. During rendezvous, the Progress approached the station in an incorrect orientation, before the automated Kurs system was deactivated, and cosmonaut Gennady Padalka took over using the manual TORU system.

== Cargo ==
The spacecraft delivered 50 kg of oxygen, 210 kg of water, about 830 kg of propellant and more than 1,200 kg of dry cargo to the ISS. Progress M-67 undocked from the ISS on 21 September 2009 at 07:25 UTC, in order to free up the aft docking port on Zvezda for the arrival of Soyuz TMA-16.

== Deorbited ==
Progress M-67 was successfully deorbited and burned up upon atmospheric reentry on 27 September 2009.
