= Progress M-29M =

Spaceflight

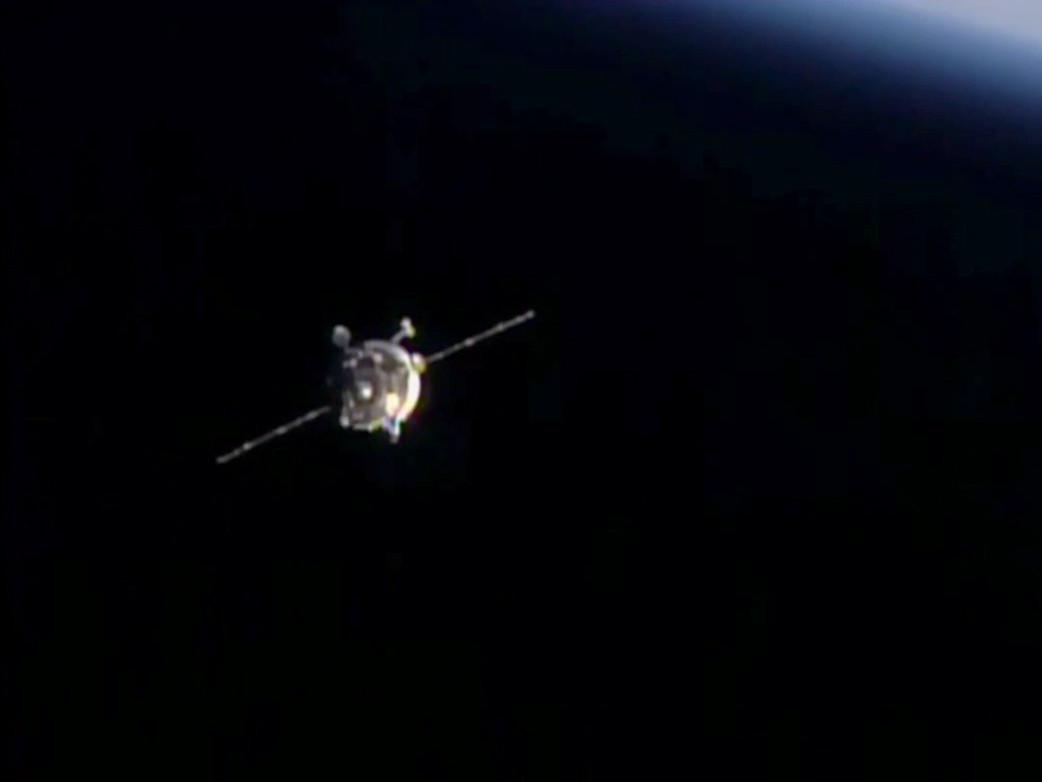
- The Progress M-29M has docked to the ISS just over six hours after launching.
- Mission type: International Space Station resupply
- Operator: Roscosmos
- COSPAR ID: 2015-055A
- SATCAT no.: 40944
- Mission duration: 190 days

Spacecraft properties
- Spacecraft type: Progress-M s/n 429
- Manufacturer: RKK Energia
- Launch mass: 7283 kg

Start of mission
- Launch date: 1 October 2015, 16:49:40 UTC
- Rocket: Soyuz-U
- Launch site: Baikonur, Site 1/5

End of mission
- Disposal: Deorbited
- Decay date: 08 April 2016, 13:31 UTC

Orbital parameters
- Reference system: Geocentric
- Regime: Low Earth
- Perigee altitude: 193.77 km
- Apogee altitude: 246.34 km
- Inclination: 51.64°
- Period: 89.42 minutes
- Epoch: 1 October 2015

Docking with ISS
- Docking port: Zvezda
- Docking date: 1 October 2015, 22:52 UTC
- Undocking date: 30 March 2016, 14:14 UTC
- Time docked: 181 days

Cargo
- Mass: 2369 kg
- Pressurised: 1549 kg
- Fuel: 350 kg
- Gaseous: 50 kg
- Water: 420 kg
- Progress ISS Resupply

Progress M-29M (Russian: Прогресс М-29М), identified by NASA as Progress 61P was a Progress spaceflight by Roskosmos to resupply the International Space Station (ISS) in 2015. It was launched on 1 October 2015, to deliver cargo to the ISS. Progress M-29M is the final vehicle in Progress M-30M series, which was succeeded by the modified variant known as Progress-MS later in 2015.

== Launch ==
Progress M-29M was launched on 1 October 2015 at 16:49:40 UTC from the Baikonur Cosmodrome in Kazakhstan.

== Docking ==
Progress M-29M docked with the Zvezda docking compartment on 1 October 2015 at 22:52 UTC. The spacecraft undocked from the station on 30 March 2016 at 14:14 UTC.

== Cargo ==
The Progress M-29M spacecraft carried 2369 kg of cargo and supplies to the International Space Station. The spacecraft delivered food, fuel and supplies, including 350 kg of propellant, 50 kg of oxygen and air, 420 kg of water, and 1549 kg of spare parts, supplies and experiment hardware for the six members of the Expedition 45 crew. Progress M-29M is scheduled to remain docked to Zvezda for about two months.

== See also ==
- 2015 in spaceflight
