= Progress M-27M =

Unsuccessful attempt to resupply the International Space Station

- Mission type: International Space Station resupply
- Operator: Roscosmos
- COSPAR ID: 2015-024A
- SATCAT no.: 40619
- Mission duration: 10 days

Spacecraft properties
- Spacecraft type: Progress-M s/n 427
- Manufacturer: RKK Energia
- Launch mass: 7289 kg

Start of mission
- Launch date: 28 April 2015, 07:09:50 UTC
- Rocket: Soyuz-2.1a
- Launch site: Baikonur, Site 31/6
- Contractor: Progress Rocket Space Centre

End of mission
- Disposal: Uncontrolled reentry
- Decay date: 08 May 2015, 02:04 UTC

Orbital parameters
- Reference system: Geocentric
- Regime: Low Earth
- Perigee altitude: 193 km
- Apogee altitude: 238 km
- Inclination: 51.67°
- Period: 88.53 minutes
- Epoch: 28 April 2015

Docking with ISS
- Docking port: Pirs
- Docking date: 28 April 2015, 13:06:39 UTC (planned)
- Undocking date: Docking annulled

Cargo
- Mass: 2357 kg
- Pressurised: 1393 kg
- Fuel: 879 kg
- Gaseous: 50 kg
- Water: 420 kg
- Progress ISS Resupply

Progress M-27M (Russian: Прогресс М-27М), identified by NASA as Progress 59P, was a Progress spacecraft used by Roscosmos in an unsuccessful attempt to resupply the International Space Station (ISS) in 2015.

== Launch ==
Progress M-27M was the 27th Progress-M 11F615A60 spacecraft, with the serial number 427. It was built by RKK Energia and was operated by the Roscosmos. This was the second time the upgraded Soyuz-2.1a rocket was used for an ISS mission launch.

The spacecraft was launched on 28 April 2015 at 07:09:50 UTC from the Baikonur Cosmodrome in Kazakhstan. Progress M-27M was launched with a planned six-hour rendezvous profile to the ISS. During the launch the spacecraft achieved low Earth orbit, but a malfunction occurred near the end of the upper stage burn shortly before the separation of the Progress spacecraft, generating a debris field and leaving the spacecraft spinning and unable to be fully controlled. The spacecraft was deemed to be a total loss.

== Cargo ==
The spacecraft carried 2,357 kilograms (5,196 lb) of food, fuel and supplies, including 494 kilograms (1,089 lb) of propellant, 50 kilograms (110 lb) of oxygen, 420 kilograms (930 lb) of water, and 1,393 kilograms (3,071 lb) of spare parts, supplies and experiment hardware for the six members of the Expedition 43 crew aboard the International Space Station.

== Spacecraft failure ==
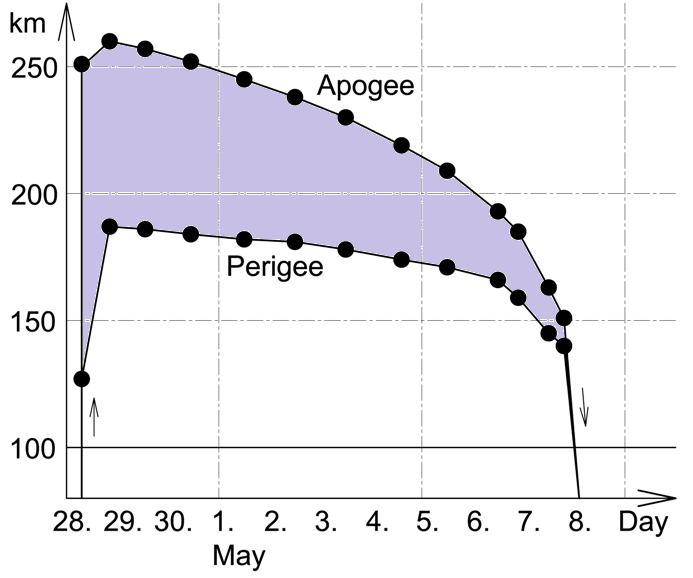
Diagram: Free fall, Altitude/Date, Progress M-27M, Object 2015-024A

After reaching low Earth orbit, but before separation of the spacecraft from the rocket, communication with the vessel was lost. Ground controllers only received brief telemetry shortly after that confirmed spacecraft separation as well as the deployment of the solar panels, but were not able to confirm the deployment of rendezvous antennas of the KURS system. Initially controllers tried to fall back to the plan of making a two-day rendezvous with the ISS, but this was also abandoned after ground stations were not able to communicate with the spacecraft during the next three orbits.

During its fourth orbit, video released from an onboard camera used for docking showed that the spacecraft was spinning wildly in space. Further efforts on that day to establish communications with the spacecraft were unsuccessful. Two more communication sessions were attempted on 28 April to regain control of the spacecraft, but did not succeed.

On 29 April, Roscosmos officially announced that the spacecraft was out of control and its orbit would eventually decay to fall back into Earth's atmosphere, with multiple systems suffering from failure and the main engine's fuel lines depressurized. The spacecraft was expected to disintegrate in the Earth's atmosphere between 7 and 11 May 2015. On the same day, the United States' NORAD reported that 44 pieces of debris "in the vicinity of the resupply vehicle and its upper stage rocket body" were being tracked by space tracking systems. Currently, various Russian sources reported that the potential cause of the anomaly may be related to the upper stage rocket engine shutdown or with the separation of the Progress spacecraft from the upper stage. A representative of the United States Air Force claimed that debris in the area indicated a blast.

Given [the altitude of the debris] and the fact that Progress was found 30 to 40 kilometres above its intended orbit, we can say with confidence that there was some kind of blast at the moment of separation from the third stage of the rocket".

On 8 May 2015 at 02:20 UTC, the spacecraft underwent destructive atmospheric reentry between 350 and 1300 km off the South American coast, west of Chile.

== Investigation ==
On 1 June 2015, Roscosmos announced the results of an investigation into the cause of the failure, attributing it to a "design peculiarity" in the linkage between the Soyuz 2.1a rocket and the spacecraft, related to the "frequency dynamic characteristics" of the linkage.

Postflight investigation found that the failure was caused by an unforeseen design flaw in the new Soyuz 2.1a Blok I stage — the propellant tanks were shaped differently than in the older Soyuz-U booster, which ended up producing resonant vibration when attached to the Progress spacecraft. The normal flight program would vent out the nitrogen pressure gas from the Blok I tanks following spacecraft separation, but engine cutoff produced a hammer effect that sent a shock wave through the stack, rupturing the propellant tanks and blasting the Progress into a much higher than planned orbit, while also leaving it in an uncontrollable spin and having suffered structural damage from being struck by flying booster debris.

The cost of the loss of the mission was valued at 2.59 billion rubles (US$50.7 million).

== See also ==
- 2015 in spaceflight
- List of Progress flights
- Progress M-12M
- SpaceX CRS-7
- Cygnus CRS Orb-3
