= Kedr =

Russian amateur radio minisatellite

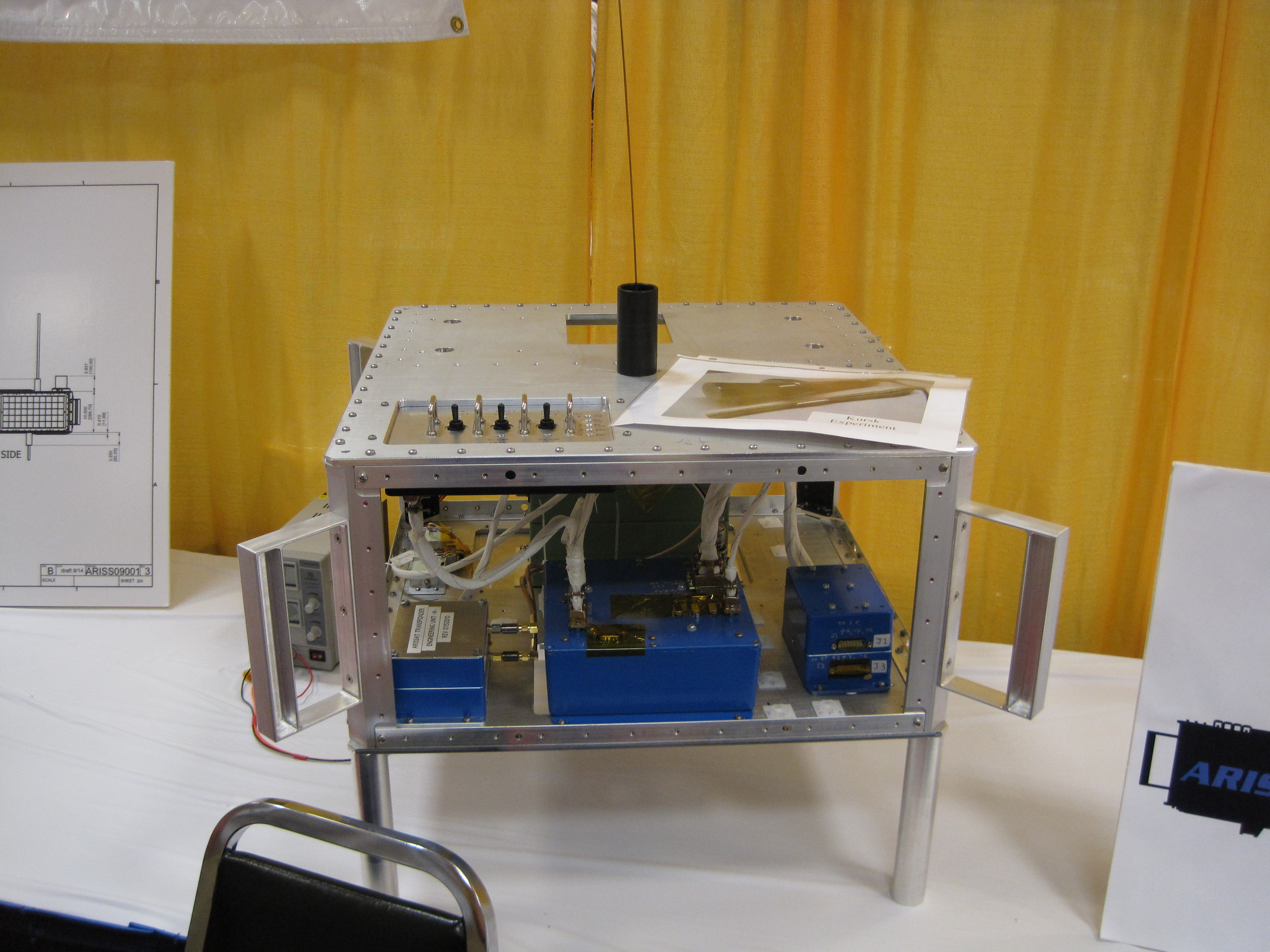
- ARISSat-1 at Dayton Hamvention 2010
- Mission type: Amateur radio
- Operator: RKK Energia
- COSPAR ID: 1998-067CK
- SATCAT no.: 37772
- Mission duration: 6 months

Spacecraft properties
- Manufacturer: The Radio Amateur Satellite Corporation (AMSAT-NA)
- Launch mass: 30 kilograms (66 lb)

Start of mission
- Launch date: 28 January 2011, 01:31:39 UTC
- Rocket: Soyuz-U
- Launch site: Baikonur 1/5
- Deployed from: ISS
- Deployment date: 3 August 2011

End of mission
- Decay date: 4 January 2012

Orbital parameters
- Reference system: Geocentric
- Regime: Low Earth

Kedr (Russian: кедр meaning Siberian pine; Yuri Gagarin's callsign during the Vostok 1 mission), also known as ARISSat 1 and RadioSkaf-2 (formerly known as SuitSat 2), was an amateur radio minisatellite operated by RKK Energia as part of the Amateur Radio on the International Space Station and RadioSkaf programmes. A follow-up to the SuitSat spacecraft, Kedr was launched to commemorate the fiftieth anniversary of the Vostok 1 mission.

Kedr transmitted 25 greetings in 15 different languages. It also transmitted photos of the Earth, telemetry and scientific data, voice, telemetry and slow-scan television data on a frequency of 145.950 MHz. The satellite was also intended for use in educational programmes. Kedr was a 30-kilogram (66 lb) satellite measuring 55 centimetres (22 in) by 55 centimetres (22 in) by 40 centimetres (16 in). It carried solar cells to generate power, and was expected to operate for six months.

For launch, Kedr was stored aboard the Progress M-09M spacecraft, which was launched to resupply the International Space Station. Progress M-09M was launched atop a Soyuz-U carrier rocket flying from Site 1/5 at the Baikonur Cosmodrome at 01:31:39 UTC on 28 January 2011. It docked with the International Space Station at 02:39 UTC on 30 January.

Kedr was deployed from the ISS by Sergey Volkov during an extra-vehicular activity on 3 August 2011 and re-entered Earth's atmosphere on 4 January 2012, having spent 154 days in orbit.

"KEDR" was also used as the suffix for several Russian amateur radio call signs (for example, RS0KEDR) that were active in 2014 around the 80th anniversary of Gagarin's birth.
