= Orbital Technologies Commercial Space Station =

Proposed commercial orbital space station

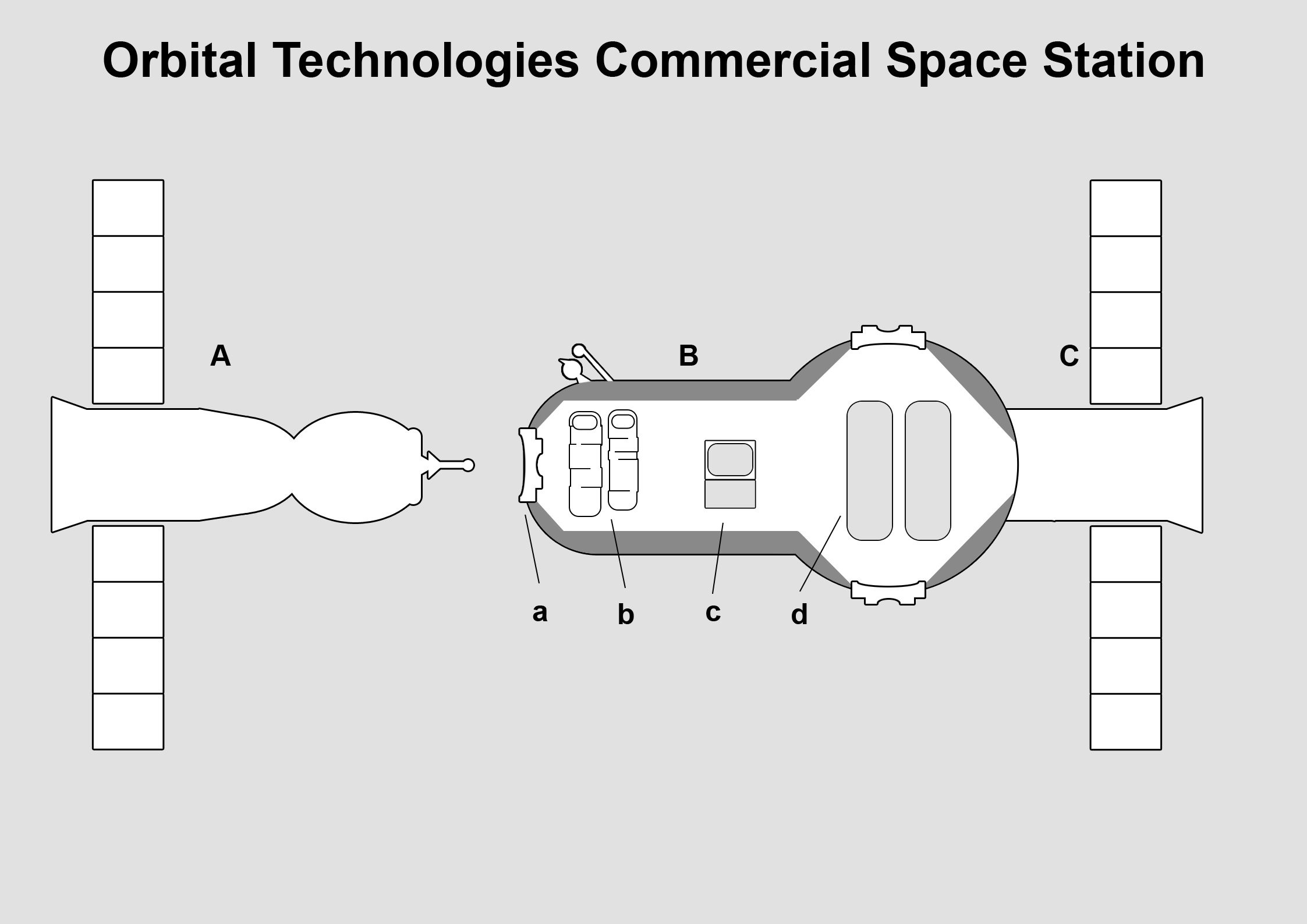
- A – Soyuz manned ferry, B – station proper, C – optional Soyuz-derived propulsion system

Station statistics
- Launch: unknown
- Diameter: 3 m (9.8 ft)
- Pressurised volume: 20 m^{3} (710 cu ft)

The Orbital Technologies Commercial Space Station is a proposed orbital space station intended for commercial clients. The station was initially proposed in 2010 by Orbital Technologies, a Russian aerospace firm (not to be confused with Orbital Sciences Corporation), who is collaborating to develop the station with Rocket and Space Corporation Energia (RSC Energia).

== History ==
As initially proposed in 2010, the station was to consist of a single module of approximately 3 metres (9.8 ft) diameter with a usable volume of about 20 m^{3} (710 cu ft).

As of November 2010, the company was "looking to launch in the next five years or so," ... "in 2015 or 2016."

At that time, several customers were "under contract from the commercial space industry and the scientific community interested in areas such as medical research, protein crystallization, and materials processing, as well as from the geographic imaging and remote-sensing industry. Media projects have also been proposed [as have] tourism."

As of August 2011, the station was planned to be launched in 2016.

As of April 2013, Orbital Technologies appointed Stiphan Beher as Chief Operating Officer, taking the firm in a global direction, joining CEO Sergey Kostenko, a former Cosmonaut; and Sergey Chernikov, former Deputy Head of Manned Space Missions for the Russian Space Agency. Orbital Technologies was co-founded by Eric Anderson, Chairman of Space Adventures.

== Financial sponsors ==
As of 2010, the station was receiving support from the Russian Federal Space Agency, who was encouraging private participation. It is hoped the station "will attract private investment for the Russian space industry." No private financing has yet been announced.

== Servicing ==
The initial 2010 plan indicated that the station would be "serviced by Russian Soyuz and Progress spacecraft and potentially other commercially available vehicles."

== See also ==
- Bigelow Commercial Space Station – Private space station designed by Bigelow Aerospace
- International Space Station – Inhabited space station in low Earth orbit
- Mir – Soviet/Russian space station (1986–2001)
- Salyut programme – Soviet space station programme
