= Progress MS-04 =

Failed 2016 Russian resupply spaceflight to the ISS

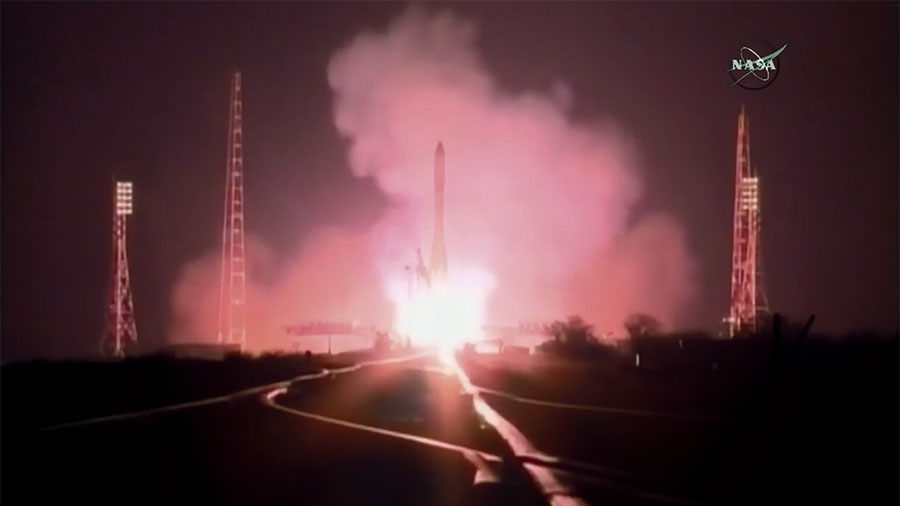
- Launch from Baikonur Cosmodrome Site 1
- Names: Progress 65; ISS 65P
- Mission type: ISS resupply
- Operator: Roscosmos
- Mission duration: Failed to orbit following control failure

Spacecraft properties
- Spacecraft: Progress MS-04 No. 434
- Spacecraft type: Progress-MS
- Manufacturer: Energia
- Launch mass: 7,285 kg (16,061 lb)
- Payload mass: 2,442 kg (5,384 lb)

Start of mission
- Launch date: 1 December 2016, 14:51:52 UTC
- Rocket: Soyuz-U No. P15000-148
- Launch site: Baikonur, Site 1/5
- Contractor: RKTs Progress

End of mission
- Decay date: Failed to orbit

Orbital parameters
- Reference system: Geocentric orbit (planned)
- Regime: Low Earth orbit
- Perigee altitude: 193.0 km (119.9 mi)
- Apogee altitude: 245.0 km (152.2 mi)
- Inclination: 51.66°
- Period: 88.59 minutes

Docking with ISS
- Docking port: Zvezda
- Docking date: 3 December 2016, 16:43:06 UTC (planned)

Cargo
- Mass: 2,442 kg (5,384 lb)
- Pressurised: 1,260 kg (2,780 lb)
- Fuel: 710 kg (1,570 lb)
- Gaseous: 52 kg (115 lb)
- Water: 420 kg (930 lb)

Progress MS-04 (Russian: Прогресс МC-04), identified by NASA as Progress 65, was a Progress mission launched by Roscosmos in an unsuccessful attempt to resupply the International Space Station (ISS).The mission ended in failure when contact was lost six minutes into the flight due to an anomaly in the third stage of the Soyuz-U rocket. The spacecraft was unable to reach orbit and disintegrated over southern Russia. The failure resulted in the loss of 2,400 kg of cargo, including food, fuel, and scientific equipment. It was the first failure of a Progress mission since Progress M-27M in 2015 and led to an investigation into the reliability of the Soyuz launch vehicle.

== Pre-launch ==
The Progress MS-04 was launched into orbit on the Soyuz-U rocket before the switch to a new-generation Soyuz-2 family, which did not depend on avionics produced in Ukraine. This move to the new variant acquired a new political significance after the Kremlin's confrontation with Kyiv in 2014. However, inside the Russian space industry, this move became controversial after the loss of the Progress M-27M spacecraft on 28 April 2015, which was blamed on design features specific to the third stage of the Soyuz-2 rocket. Although the Soyuz-2 was officially declared fully operational in March 2016, there was lingering concern over this variant's reliability in the long term, stressing the need for a potential backup. The rocket issue remained open as the Progress MS-04 launch campaign got underway. The mission of Progress MS-04 was previously scheduled for 1 July 2016, but it later slipped back, along with the rest of the ISS flight manifest. Following the lengthy delay with the launch of the Soyuz MS-02 mission in September 2016, the liftoff of Progress MS-04 was rescheduled to 1 December 2016.

According to the flight schedule, Progress MS-04 was scheduled to dock at the Zvezda service module, on 3 December 2016, at 16:43:06 UTC, during the 34th orbit. The nominal docking was expected to be fully automated with Russian cosmonauts Sergey Ryzhikov and Oleg Novitsky at the inside of the station, ready to engage manual remote-control. Progress MS-04 carried a number of significant items, including the upgraded Orlan-MKS spacesuit for Russian spacewalks, a mini-greenhouse and an experimental system to recycle water and urine, the official Russian TASS news agency reported.

== Launch failure ==
Progress MS-04 was launched on 1 December 2016 at 14:51:52 UTC from the Baikonur Cosmodrome in Kazakhstan. It used the second to last Soyuz-U rocket. The Progress MS-04 mission was to use the two-day, 34-orbit trip to the station instead of the previously available six-hour rendezvous profile.

The launch proceeded normally until telemetry was lost at T+382.3 seconds, about two minutes into the Blok I stage burn. At this time, the Progress apparently separated from the third stage, almost six minutes earlier than nominal. A high altitude explosion was reported over the skies of Tuva, and debris from the third stage and Progress impacted in a mountainous area approximately 3500 km downrange from Baikonur. An investigation by Roscosmos suggested that a manufacturing defect in the RD-0110 engine may have led to the failure. Following this incident, additional inspections were ordered for upcoming Soyuz launches to ensure quality control.

== Cargo ==
The Progress MS-04 spacecraft was carrying 2,442 kg (5,384 lb) of cargo and supplies to the International Space Station. The spacecraft was delivering food, fuel and supplies, including 710 kg (1,570 lb) of propellant, 52 kg (115 lb) of air, and 420 kg (930 lb) of drinking water. Progress MS-04 was scheduled to dock with the aft docking port of the Zvezda module.

== Investigation ==
On 3 December 2016, Roskosmos said that the Soyuz-U rocket with the Progress MS-04 spacecraft had been insured for 2,135 billion rubles through VTB Strakhovanie. The State Corporation also said that the Interagency Commission led by Roscosmos Head Igor Komarov and his Deputy Aleksandr Ivanov was scheduled to complete the investigation by 20 December 2016.

Preliminary investigation found that the Progress had separated from the third stage six minutes and 23 seconds into launch, and that third-stage telemetry failed. The reason for the premature separation was unclear. Although the Blok I computer system was capable of issuing a manual shutoff command in the event of a malfunction, this could only occur if engine chamber pressure dropped below a certain level or the booster began deviating from its flight path and telemetry data up to the point of the malfunction indicated normal third-stage performance. Sensing normal separation, the Progress began deploying its antennas and preparing to fire its propulsion system, but the Blok I was still thrusting and apparently collided with the spacecraft at least twice, sending it into a tailspin and possibly rupturing the instrument module. As evidence of this, the Progress began activating its thermal control system in response to loss of instrument module compartment temperatures. It was suspected that the loss of Blok I telemetry could have been caused by the collision with the Progress, which may have damaged antennas on the booster.

The separation command was normally issued by the third stage following engine cutoff, but the Progress could issue a backup command itself, which was maintained as a possible cause of the malfunction.

On 11 January 2017, Roscosmos announced the results of an investigation into the cause of the failure. Most likely, the oxygen pump of the Blok I third-stage engine (11D55) caught fire and disintegrated, rupturing the oxygen tank. The fire was probably caused by "foreign particles" in the pump, or an assembly error.

On 23 January 2017, Ivan Koptev, Director General of the Federal State Unitary Enterprise Voronezh Mechanical Plant resigned for unsatisfactory performance and quality of products.

On 28 January 2017, the Russian government announced as a result of the investigation into Progress MS-04 the recall of all Proton-M second- and third-stage engines produced by the Voronezh Mechanical Plant (common to the failed Progress flight) including the disassembly of three completed Proton rockets and a three-and-a-half-month suspension of flights. An investigation had found that engine parts that were supposed to use precious metals had been substituted for cheaper alternatives that were unable to resist high temperatures as well as finding that production and certification documentation were falsified.
