= SuitSat =

Russian space suit converted into a satellite

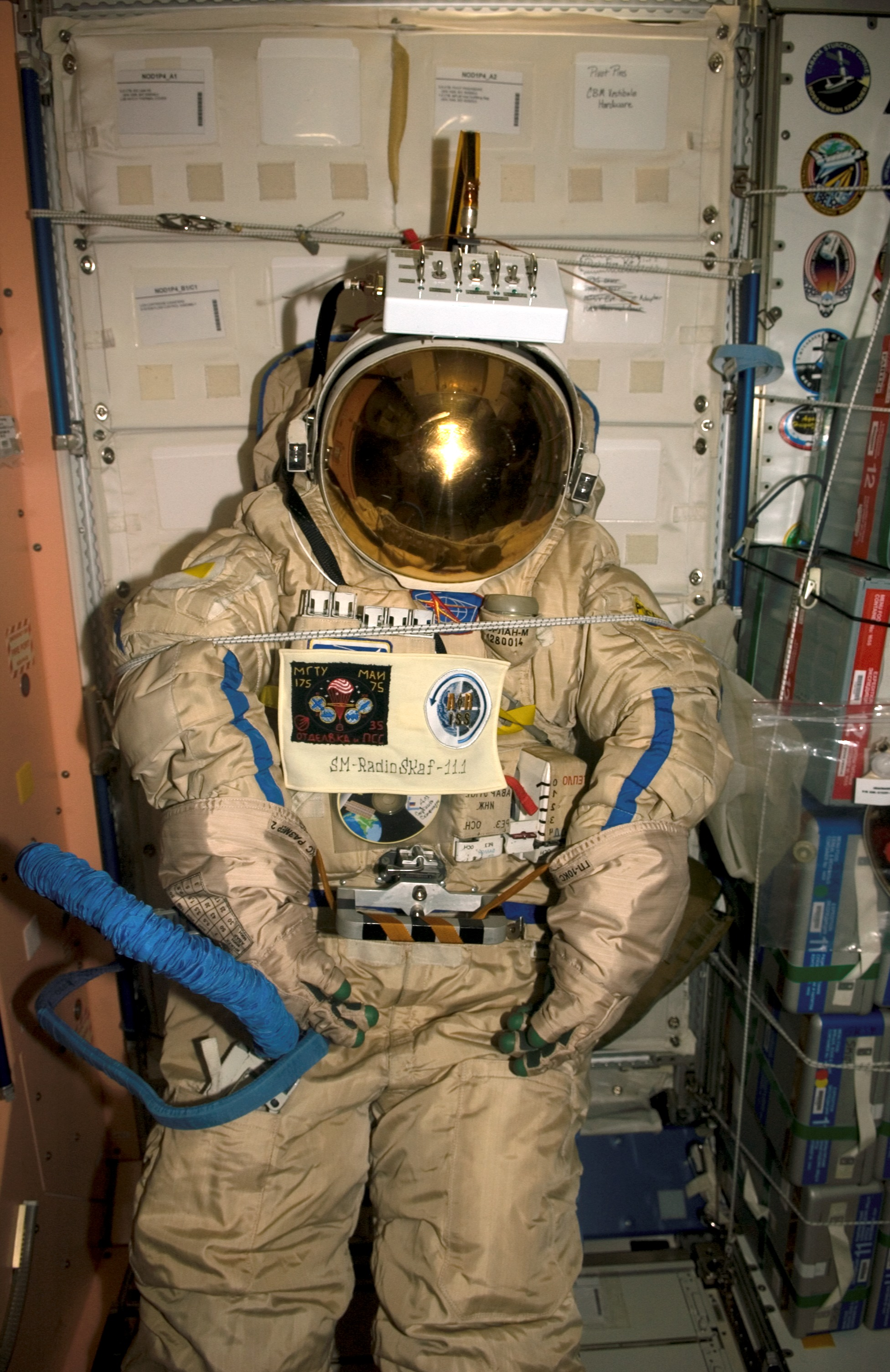
SuitSat-1 inside the ISS

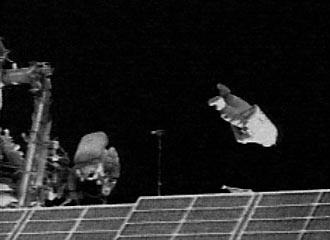
Launch of SuitSat-1 (seen on the right; an astronaut is the figure on the left)

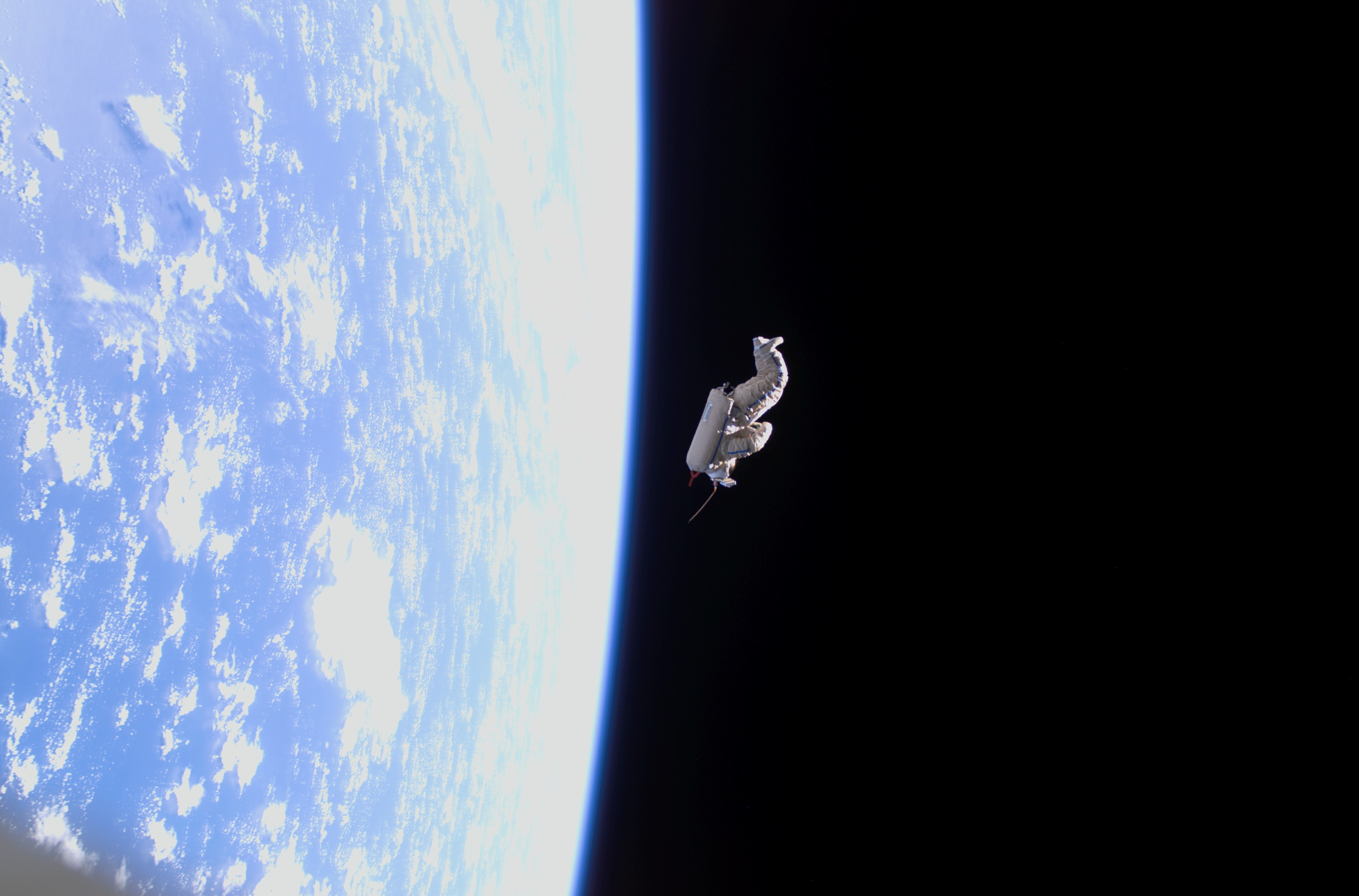
SuitSat-1 in orbit after being deployed from ISS

SuitSat (also known as SuitSat-1, Mr. Smith, Ivan Ivanovich, RadioSkaf, Radio Sputnik, and AMSAT-OSCAR 54) was a retired Russian Orlan space suit with a radio transmitter mounted on its helmet, used as a hand-launched satellite.

First devised around 2004, SuitSat-1 was deployed in an ephemeral orbit around the Earth from the International Space Station on February 3, 2006. Contact from SuitSat-1 was lost by February 18, and the satellite burned up on reentry in Earth's atmosphere on September 7.

A similar hand-launched satellite, Kedr, was released in 2011 and was initially named SuitSat-2, despite not using a space suit.

== SuitSat-1 ==
The idea for this OSCAR satellite was first formally discussed at an AMSAT symposium in October 2004, although the ARISS-Russia team is credited with coming up with the idea as a commemorative gesture for the 175th anniversary of the Moscow State Technical University. According to Frank Bauer of NASA's Goddard Space Flight Center, a group of Russian researchers led by Sergey Samburov devised the idea of converting disused space suits into satellites.

In a move originally planned for December 6, 2005, SuitSat-1 entered its own independent orbit just after 23:05 UTC on February 3, 2006, when it was released from the International Space Station by Valeri Tokarev and Bill McArthur as part of an unrelated spacewalk. Voice messages recorded by the teams involved, and by students from around the globe, were continuously broadcast in a number of languages from the SuitSat, along with telemetry data. The signal began transmission approximately 15 minutes after SuitSat-1 was jettisoned and was relayed by equipment on board the ISS. Anyone receiving the transmission could log an entry on the tracker at suitsat.org, detailing when and where they heard it.

The SuitSat-1 mission was not a total success. There were very few reports that actually confirmed the receiving of the transmission. NASA TV later announced that SuitSat ceased functioning after only two orbits due to battery failure, but there were reports suggesting that SuitSat-1 continued transmitting, albeit far more weakly than expected.

The official designation for SuitSat is AMSAT-OSCAR 54, though it was nicknamed "Ivan Ivanovich" or "Mr. Smith". The radio transmitter used a frequency of 145.990 MHz.

The last confirmed signal report from SuitSat-1 was the report of KC7GZC on February 18, 2006. All later reports indicate that no signal was received when SuitSat-1 was due to pass over.

On September 7, 2006, at 16:00 GMT, SuitSat reentered the Earth's atmosphere over the Southern Ocean at 110.4° East longitude and 46.3° South latitude. It was over a point some 1,400 km south-southwest of Cape Leeuwin, Australia.

== ARISSat-1 (formerly SuitSat-2) ==
ARISSat-1, formerly SuitSat-2 and also known as Kedr, was another ISS hand-launched satellite. It contained experiments built by students and a software-defined radio capable of supporting a U/v (UHF uplink; VHF downlink) linear transponder, FM telemetry, voice recordings and live SSTV imagery. Unlike SuitSat-1, batteries on ARISSat-1 were charged by solar panels, and had a predicted lifetime of up to six months (an interval during which it was expected to deorbit). Kedr was deployed from the ISS by Sergey Volkov on 3 August 2011, and re-entered Earth's atmosphere in January 2012, having spent 154 days in orbit.

== In popular culture ==
Decommissioned, a 2021 short film, depicts SuitSat as a haunted entity that gains sentience and attacks the ISS. The short won a finalist position in a filmmaking competition using the Unreal Engine.

SuitSat, a 2018 short film, imagines what SuitSat sees as it orbits Earth as a ghost. The film won a Space Award and was voiced by Gruff Rhys.

A SuitSat was also feature in the popular KDrama, When the Stars Gossip, scaring the main character as he thinks it is a dead astronaut.
