= Progress M-12M =

Resupply mission or crew escape test

- A Progress-M spacecraft
- Mission type: ISS resupply
- Operator: Roskosmos
- Mission duration: Failed to orbit

Spacecraft properties
- Spacecraft type: Progress-M s/n 412
- Manufacturer: RKK Energia

Start of mission
- Launch date: 24 August 2011, 13:00:11 UTC
- Rocket: Soyuz-U
- Launch site: Baikonur, Site 1/5

Orbital parameters
- Reference system: Geocentric (Failed to orbit)
- Regime: Low Earth
- Inclination: 51.6°
- Epoch: 24 August 2011

Docking with ISS
- Docking port: Zvezda (planned)
- Docking date: 26 August 2011, 14:40 UTC
- Undocking date: 5 March 2012
- Time docked: 192 days

Cargo
- Mass: 2670 kg
- Pressurised: 1204 kg (dry cargo)
- Fuel: 996 kg
- Gaseous: 50 kg (oxygen)
- Water: 420 kg
- Progress ISS Resupply

Progress M-12M (Russian: Прогресс М-12М), identified by NASA as Progress 44P, was an uncrewed Progress spacecraft that was lost in a launch failure on 24 August 2011, at the start of a mission to resupply the International Space Station. It was the twelfth modernised Progress-M spacecraft to be launched. Manufactured by RKK Energia, the spacecraft was to have been operated by the Russian Federal Space Agency.

== Planned mission ==
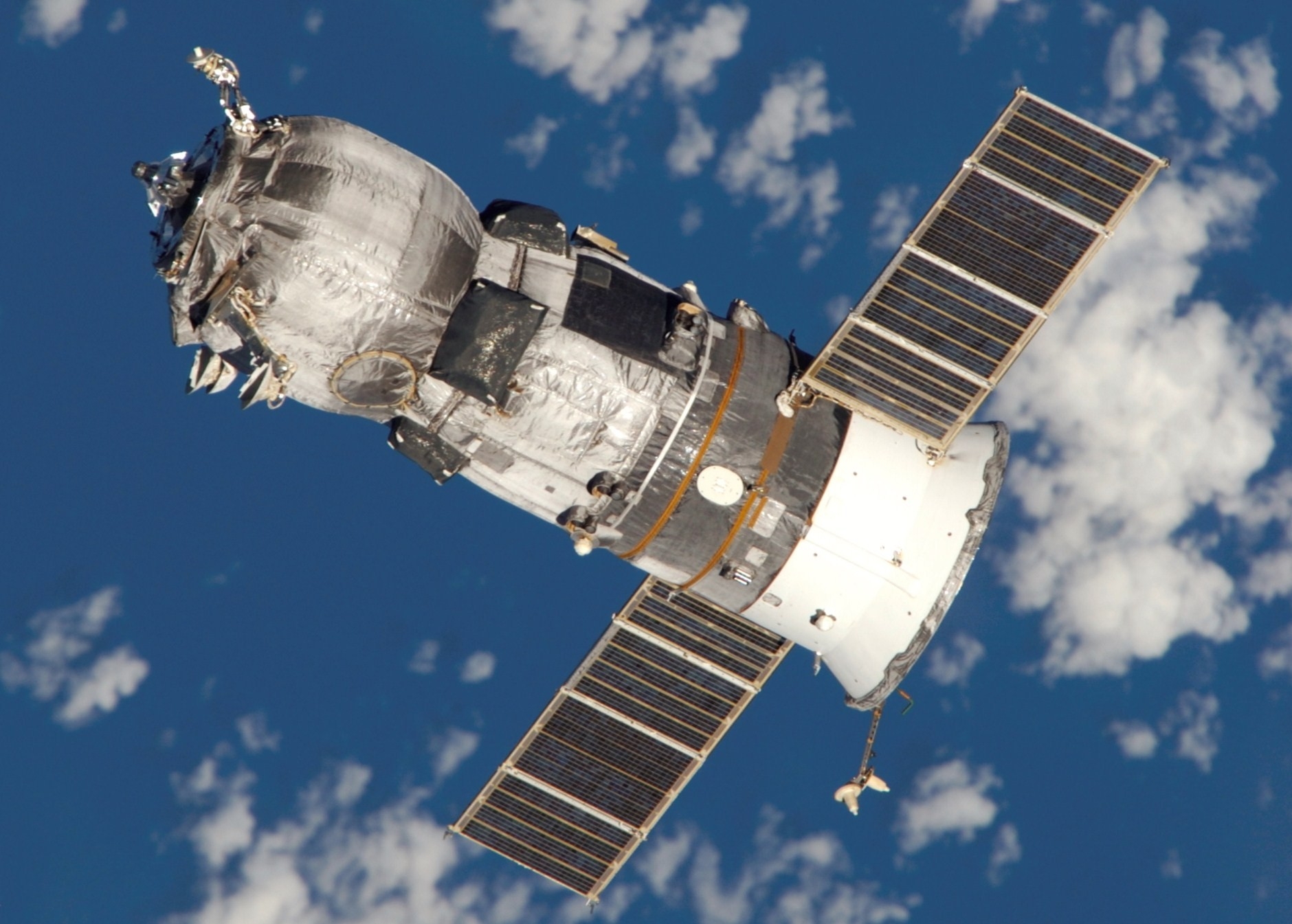
A Progress spacecraft

Progress M-12M's planned mission had included resupplying ISS with 2670 kg of supplies, including oxygen, food and fuel. The planned mission also included three reboosts to the ISS.

Progress M-12M was due to dock with the aft port of the Zvezda module of the International Space Station at around 14:40 UTC on 26 August 2011, just over two days after launch. It would have remained docked for six months, before undocking on 5 March 2012.

== Cargo ==
Progress M-12M was carrying 2,670 kilograms (5,890 lb) of cargo to the International Space Station. This included 420 kilograms (930 lb) of water, 50 kilograms (110 lb) of oxygen, and 996 kilograms (2,196 lb) of fuel. Of the fuel, 746 kilograms (1,645 lb) would have been used to refuel the ISS, and the remaining 250 kilograms would have been expended by the Progress spacecraft whilst docked, in its three reboost manoeuvres.

The spacecraft also contained 1,204 kilograms (2,654 lb) of dry cargo, which consisted of parts for the station's air, water, power, lighting and thermal regulation systems, its control panels, and power supply system. Amongst the rest of the cargo was a further 4 kilograms (8.8 lb) of spare parts, 94 kilograms (207 lb) of hygiene supplies, 17 kilograms (37 lb) of protective equipment for the crew, 267 kilograms (589 lb) of food and 66 kilograms (146 lb) of medical and personal hygiene supplies, including air purification systems and new clothes for the crew. The spacecraft would also have delivered 139 kilograms (306 lb) of personal supplies for the crew, including letters, parcels and cameras. Of this, 37 kilograms (82 lb) was for the entire crew, and the remaining 102 kilograms (225 lb) was for the Russian crewmembers only.

Equipment to be installed in the various modules of the ISS was also aboard the Progress, with 31 kilograms (68 lb) to be installed in the Zarya module, 10 kilograms (22 lb) for Pirs, 77 kilograms (170 lb) for Rassvet, and 367 kilograms (809 lb) for installation in US modules. A further 38 kilograms (84 lb) of the cargo consisted of twelve scientific experiments to be performed aboard the station.

== Launch failure ==
Progress M-12M was launched by a Soyuz-U carrier rocket, flying from Area 1/5 of the Baikonur Cosmodrome. Liftoff occurred at 13:00:11 UTC on 24 August 2011.

Approximately 325 seconds into flight, a malfunction was detected in the RD-0110 engine powering the Blok I third stage of the Soyuz-U rocket, which caused the onboard computer to terminate the flight through thrust termination. As a result, the vehicle failed to achieve orbit, reentering over the Altai Republic region of Russia. It was the first failure of a Progress spacecraft since launches began in 1978, and the third consecutive orbital launch failure worldwide, following the failures of Ekspress-AM4 and Shijian XI-04 less than a week prior.

As a precaution, the launch of a GLONASS satellite on a Soyuz-2.1b/Fregat, which had been scheduled for 26 August 2011, was delayed until the engines could be inspected.

On 9 September 2011, the FKA announced that the loss was caused by a blocked fuel duct, which caused the engines to shut down prematurely. The failure was not expected to have any immediate effect on the crew of the International Space Station, as the outpost was stocked with reserves of food, water and oxygen. The spacecraft was insured for three billion rubles (US$103 million).

== See also ==
- 2011 in spaceflight
- List of Progress flights
- Uncrewed spaceflights to the International Space Station
