= TORU =

Russian manual docking system for Soyuz and Progress spacecraft

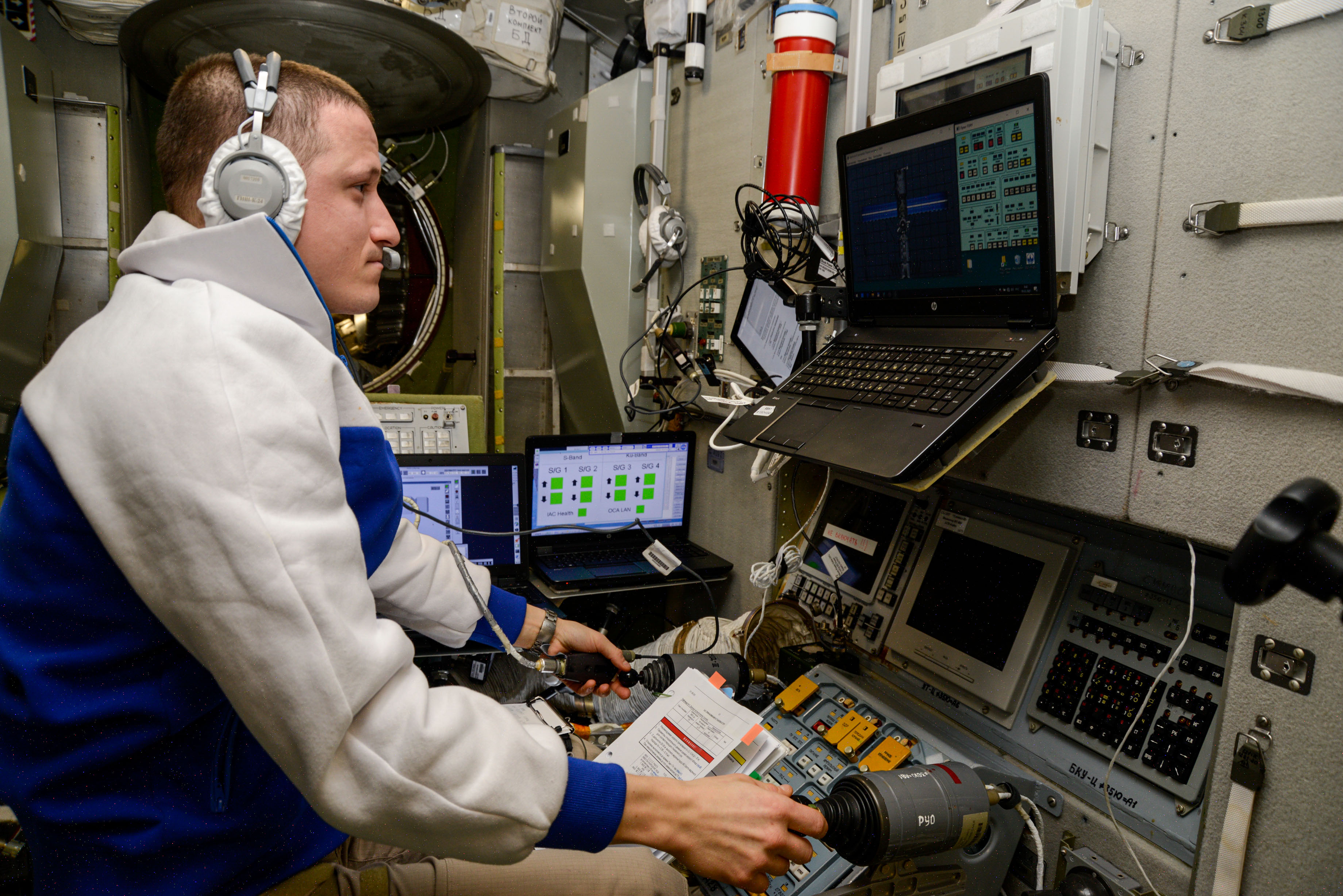
Cosmonaut Sergey Kud-Sverchkov practices using the TORU equipment in the Zvezda module on the International Space Station

TORU (Tele-robotically Operated Rendezvous Unit, Russian: Телеоператорный Режим Управления, lit. 'Teleoperator Control Mode') is a manual docking system for uncrewed Russian Progress and Soyuz spacecraft. It serves as a backup to the automatic Kurs system. The system was used on the Mir space station and is used on the International Space Station.

== Operation ==
TORU allows a spacecraft to be controlled remotely from the station during rendezvous and docking. The control interface is similar to that of a Soyuz spacecraft, with two joysticks used for translation and rotation. The operator receives a video feed from a camera mounted on the front of the spacecraft, comparable to the view provided by the periscope on Soyuz. Control inputs are transmitted by radio from the station to the spacecraft.

Operators experience a delay of less than one second between control input and spacecraft response. This latency can affect handling, requiring operators to make smaller and more deliberate control inputs to avoid overcorrection.

== History ==
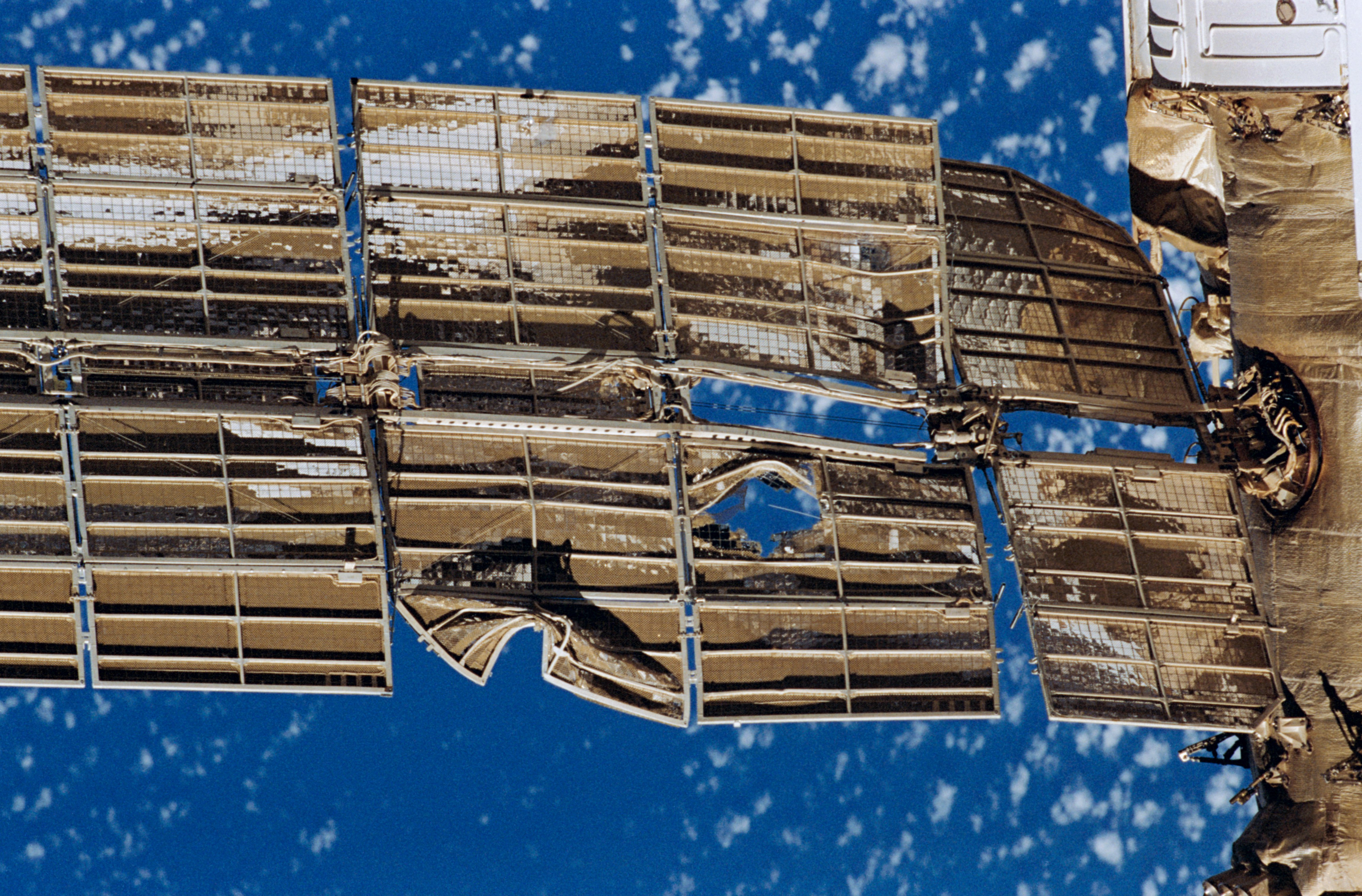
Spektr module solar array after the collision from the TORU test with Progress M-34

TORU was first tested in 1993 during Progress M-15 and was used operationally the following year to dock Progress M-24 after unsuccessful attempts using the automatic system.

In 1997, TORU was used during the manual docking attempt of Progress M-34 to Mir, which resulted in a collision that damaged the Spektr module and caused a depressurization event. The system was subsequently used to dock Progress M-35 after a failure of Mir's onboard computer.

TORU has also been used for manual docking to the ISS during Progress M1-4 (2000), Progress M-53 (2005), Progress M-67 (2009), and Progress MS-33 (2026).
