= Progress-M =

Spacecraft which is used to resupply space stations

Progress M Progress M-M
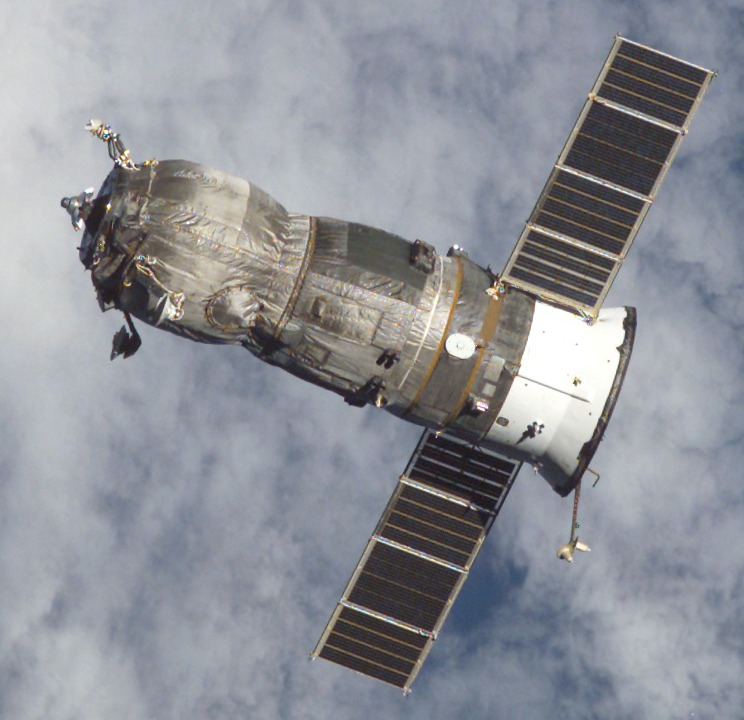
- Progress M-47, a Progress M model, as seen from the ISS
- Manufacturer: Energia
- Country of origin: USSR; Russia
- Operator: Roscosmos
- Applications: Space station resupply

Specifications
- Spacecraft type: Cargo
- Dry mass: 4,740 kg (10,450 lb)
- Payload capacity: Launch: 2,350 kg (5,180 lb); Disposal: 1,600 kg (3,500 lb)
- Volume: 6.6 m^{3} (230 cu ft) in cargo section
- Regime: Low Earth orbit
- Design life: 180 days when docked to a space station

Production
- Status: Retired
- Built: M: 67; M-M: 30
- Launched: M: 67; M-M: 30
- Retired: M: 67; M-M: 28
- Failed: M-M: 1 (M-27M)
- Lost: M-M: 1 (M-12M)
- Maiden launch: M: 23 August 1989 (M-1); M-M: 26 November 2008 (M-01M)
- Last launch: M: 24 November 2021 (M-UM); M-M: 1 October 2015 (M-29M)
- Last retirement: M: 23 December 2021 (M-UM); M-M: 8 April 2016 (M-29M)

Related spacecraft
- Derived from: Progress 7K-TG; Soyuz T Soyuz TM
- Derivatives: Progress M1; Progress MS

Configuration

Progress M (Russian: Прогресс М, GRAU: 11F615A55), also known as Progress 7K-TGM, is a Russian (formerly Soviet) uncrewed cargo spacecraft used to resupply space stations. It is a variant of the Progress series, developed in the late 1980s as a modernized version of the Progress 7K-TG spacecraft. Progress-M incorporated improved systems derived from the Soyuz T and Soyuz TM crewed spacecraft. The Progress M-M (GRAU: 11F615A60) introduced further upgrades, including digital flight control systems replacing earlier analog systems.

The first 43 Progress M spacecraft supported Mir, with later missions servicing the International Space Station (ISS). A total of 87 spacecraft were launched, including 67 of the Progress M variant and 30 of the upgraded Progress M-M. Two spacecraft were lost: Progress M-12M in a launch failure in August 2011, and Progress M-27M, which lost control after reaching orbit in April 2015 and reentered the atmosphere.

The Progress M1 was a derivative of the Progress M optimized to carry more propellant at the expense of dry cargo and water. This reflected operational needs of the ISS, where the Space Shuttle provided large-capacity delivery of dry cargo and water, but could not transport the hypergolic propellants required for the station's propulsion system. The Progress M1 entered service in 2000 and was retired in 2004. A further upgraded M1-M variant incorporating improvements from the Progress M-M was planned but canceled before entering service.

The final flight of the Progress M variant was Progress M-67 in July 2009, while the final Progress M-M mission was Progress M-29M in October 2015. It was succeeded by the upgraded Progress MS, which first flew in December 2015.

Several Progress M spacecraft were modified as "space tugs" to deliver station modules. Progress M-14 and M-38 delivered VDU attitude control systems to Mir in 1992 and 1998, respectively. Later missions supported the ISS: Progress DC-1 delivered Pirs in 2001, M-MIM2 delivered Poisk in 2009, and M-UM delivered Prichal in 2021.

== Specifications (Progress M) ==
Data from

- Dry mass: 4,740 kilograms (10,450 lb)
- Total payload capacity at launch: 2,350 kilograms (5,180 lb) – the following amounts exceed this capacity, giving planners the ability to match the payload to the needs of the station
  - Dry cargo (in cargo section): Up to 1,800 kilograms (4,000 lb) in 6.6 cubic metres (230 cu ft)
  - Propellant: Up to 850 kilograms (1,870 lb)
  - Water: Up to 420 kilograms (930 lb)
  - Gases: Up to 50 kilograms (110 lb)
- Total payload capacity (in cargo section) for disposal: 1,600 kilograms (3,500 lb)

== See also ==
- Comparison of orbital spacecraft
- Automated Transfer Vehicle
- Cygnus spacecraft
- SpaceX Dragon
- H-II Transfer Vehicle
