= Progress (spacecraft) =

Russian expendable freighter spacecraft

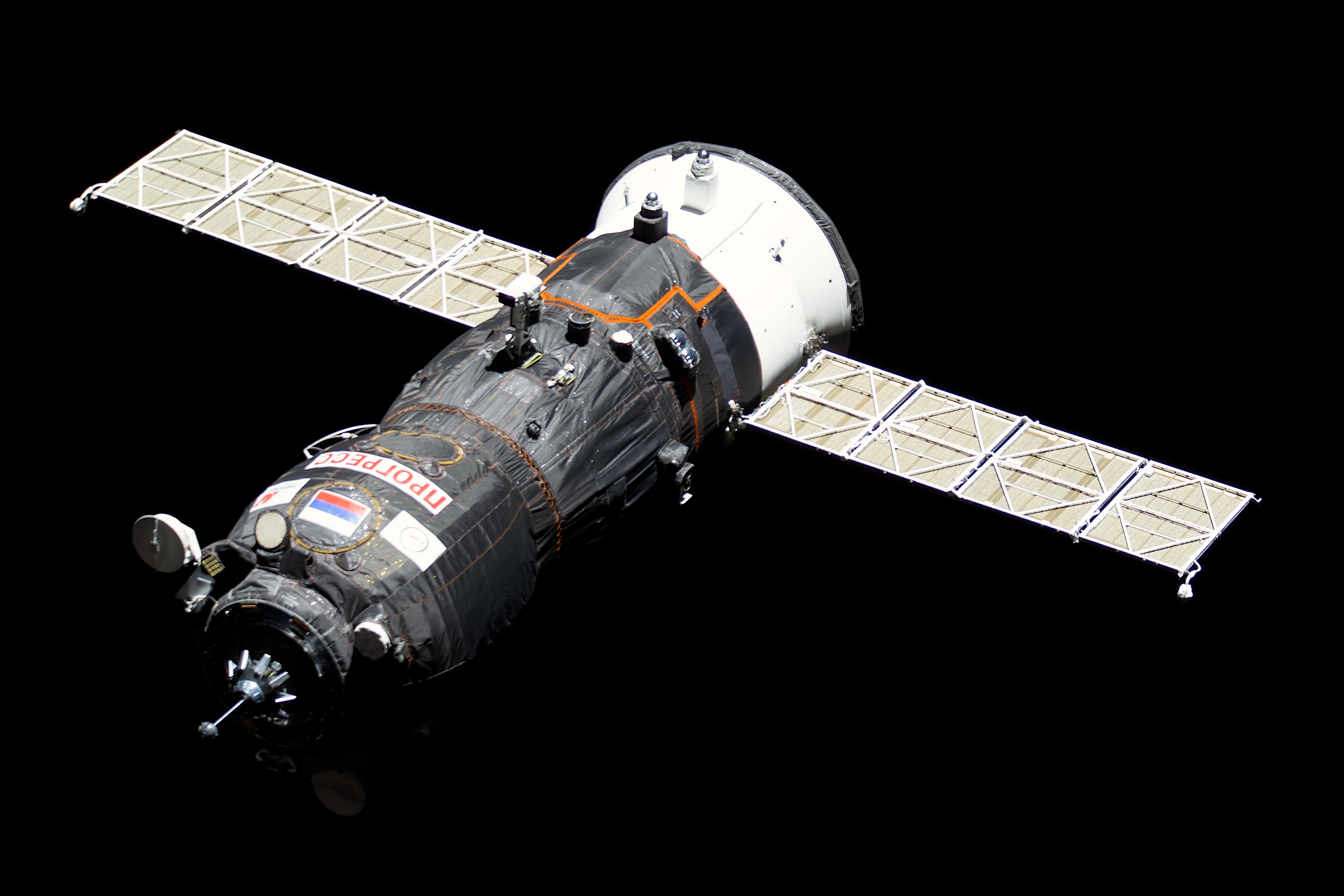
- Progress MS-11 spacecraft in space
- Manufacturer: Energia
- Country of origin: Soviet Union / Russia
- Operator: Roscosmos
- Applications: Space station cargo resupply

Specifications
- Spacecraft type: Cargo
- Launch mass: 7,440 kg (16,400 lb)
- Payload capacity: Launch: 2,600 kg (5,700 lb); Disposal: 2,140 kg (4,720 lb)
- Volume: 7 m^{3} (250 cu ft) in cargo section
- Regime: Low Earth orbit
- Design life: 240 days when docked to a space station; 30 days free flight

Dimensions
- Length: 7.4 m (24 ft)
- Diameter: 2.7 m (8 ft 10 in)
- Solar array span: 10.7 m (35 ft)

Production
- Built: 186 (as of 22 March 2026)
- Operational: 2 (MS-32, MS-33)
- Retired: 181
- Lost: 3 (M-12M, M-27M, MS‑04)

Configuration
- All specifications are for Progress MS version

Progress (Russian: Прогресс) is a Russian expendable cargo spacecraft. Originally developed for the Soviet space program and derived from the crewed Soyuz spacecraft, Progress has been instrumental in maintaining long-duration space missions by providing consumables like food, water, and air, as well as maintenance equipment. Since its maiden flight in 1978, Progress has supported various space stations, including Salyut 6, Salyut 7, and Mir, and remains a key resupply vehicle for the International Space Station (ISS).

Each Progress mission delivers thousands of kilograms of supplies in its pressurized module. It also carries water, fuel, and gases to replenish the station's resources and sustain its onboard atmosphere. Beyond resupply duties, a docked Progress can maneuver or reboost the station, countering atmospheric drag and maintaining its operational altitude. When a Progress spacecraft nears the end of its design life, it is loaded with waste, undocked, and deorbited to safely make a destructive reentry in Earth's atmosphere.

As of November 2024, there have been 182 Progress flights, with only three failures, all occurring between 2011 and 2016. Typically, three to four Progress flights are launched to the ISS each year. Due to the variation in Progress vehicles flown to the ISS, NASA uses its own nomenclature where "ISS 1P" means the first Progress spacecraft to ISS.

== Design ==
The Progress spacecraft shares much of its design with the crewed Soyuz spacecraft but with several modifications to make it better suited to cargo transport. It consists of three distinct sections:

- Cargo section: Based on the Soyuz orbital module, this pressurized section carries supplies for the crew, including maintenance items, prepackaged and fresh food, scientific equipment, and clothing. Its docking drogue is similar to that of Soyuz, but with additional ducting that enables the automated transfer of fuel, water, and gases.
- Tanker section: Replacing the Soyuz reentry module, this unpressurized compartment houses tanks used to transport unsymmetrical dimethylhydrazine (UDMH) fuel, dinitrogen tetroxide (N_{2}O_{4}) oxidizer, drinking water, and atmospheric gases. Ducts connect the tanks to transfer lines routed along the exterior of the pressurized module to connectors at the docking port, enabling automated transfer. The design is intended to prevent leaks of propellants from entering the station atmosphere. The water and gases supplement supplies generated by the station's life-support system.
- Instrumentation/propulsion section: Largely derived from the Soyuz instrumentation/propulsion module, this unpressurized compartment is slightly elongated to accommodate avionics normally housed in the Soyuz descent module. It contains engines used for attitude control and automated docking, and is also used to reboost the station's orbit once docked.

Unlike Soyuz, the Progress spacecraft does not require a life support system, heat shields, parachutes, or crew escape systems and cannot be separated into multiple modules. The elimination of these systems significantly reduces the spacecraft's mass, allowing for increased cargo capacity. After completing its mission, the spacecraft is typically filled with waste, undocks, performs a controlled deorbit burn, and burns up during reentry into Earth's atmosphere

== Versions ==
Five major variants of the Progress spacecraft have been flown so far: Progress 7K-TG (1978–1990), Progress M (1989–2009), Progress M1 (2000–2004), Progress M-M (2008–2015) and Progress MS (since 2015).

In addition, three custom Progress M variants were launched to deliver ISS modules Pirs in 2001, Poisk in 2009 and Prichal in 2021.

=== Progress 7K-TG (1978–1990) ===
Progress logistics resupply spacecraft. It consists of the dry cargo module (left); the tanker compartment (center); and a stretched service module (right).

There were 42 spacecraft built using the initial Progress design, the last one being launched in May 1990.

The bureau in charge of designing the freighter was TsKBEM (now RKK Energia). They began work on the design in mid-1973, assigning Progress the GRAU index 11F615A15. The design was complete by February 1974, and the first production model was ready for launch in November 1977. Progress 1 launched on 20 January 1978 aboard the same rocket used to launch the Soyuz. It still featured the same launch shroud as the Soyuz, though this was purely for aerodynamic purposes as the launch escape system had been deactivated.

This first version of Progress had a mass of 7,020 kg (15,480 lb) and carried 2,300 kg (5,100 lb) of cargo, or 30% of its launch mass. It had the same diameter as the Soyuz at 2.2 m (7 ft 3 in), but was 8 m (26 ft) in length – slightly longer. The autonomous flight time was 3 days, the same time as that of the Soyuz ferry. It could spend 30 days docked. Progress always docked to the aft port of the station it was resupplying (the aft being where the main rocket engines of the station and their tankage, for refueling by the Progress, are located).

- Launch mass: 7,020–7,249 kg (15,476–15,981 lb)
- Mass of cargo:
  - ~2,300 kg (5,100 lb) (before Progress-24)
  - ~2,500 kg (5,500 lb) (from Progress-24)
- Length: 7.94 m (26.0 ft)
- Diameter of cargo modules: 2.2 m (7 ft 3 in)
- Maximum diameter: 2.72 m (8 ft 11 in)
- Volume of cargo compartment: 6.6 m^{3} (230 cu ft)

=== Progress M (1989–2009) ===
Diagram of exterior of the Progress M

Diagram of interior of the Progress M

The upgraded Progress M (GRAU: 11F615A55, manufacturer's designation: 7K-TGM) was first launched in August 1989. The first 43 flights all went to Mir; following Mir's re-entry, Progress was used as the resupply vehicle for the International Space Station. As of December 2020, there have been over 80 flights (over different configurations) to the ISS and more are scheduled.

The Progress M is essentially the same spacecraft as the Progress, but it features improvements based on the Soyuz-T and Soyuz-TM designs. It can spend up to 30 days in autonomous flight and is able to carry 100 kg (220 lb) more. Also, unlike the old Progress crafts, it can return items to Earth. This is accomplished by using the VBK-Raduga capsule, which can carry up to 150 kg (330 lb) of cargo. It is 1.5 m (4 ft 11 in) long and 60 cm (24 in) in diameter and has a "dry mass" of 350 kg (770 lb). Progress M can also dock to the forward port of the station and still transfer fuel. It uses the same rendezvous system as the Soyuz, and it features solar panels for the first time.

- Launch mass: 7,130 kg (15,720 lb)
- Cargo mass: 2,600 kg (5,700 lb)
- Dry cargo mass: 1,500 kg (3,300 lb)
- Liquid cargo mass: 1,540 kg (3,400 lb)
- Length: 7.23 m (23.7 ft)
- Diameter of cargo modules: 2.2 m (7 ft 3 in)
- Maximum diameter: 2.72 m (8 ft 11 in)
- Dry cargo compartment volume: 7.6 m^{3} (270 cu ft)
- Solar array span: 10.6 m (35 ft)

In addition to the traditional Progress-M spacecraft, three modified "space tug" versions were built to deliver modules to the ISS. These variants lacked a pressurized cargo section and had a heavily modified tanker section. Progress DC-1 delivered Pirs in 2001, Progress M-MIM2 delivered Poisk in 2009 and Progress M-UM delivered Prichal in 2021.

=== Progress M-M (2008–2015) ===
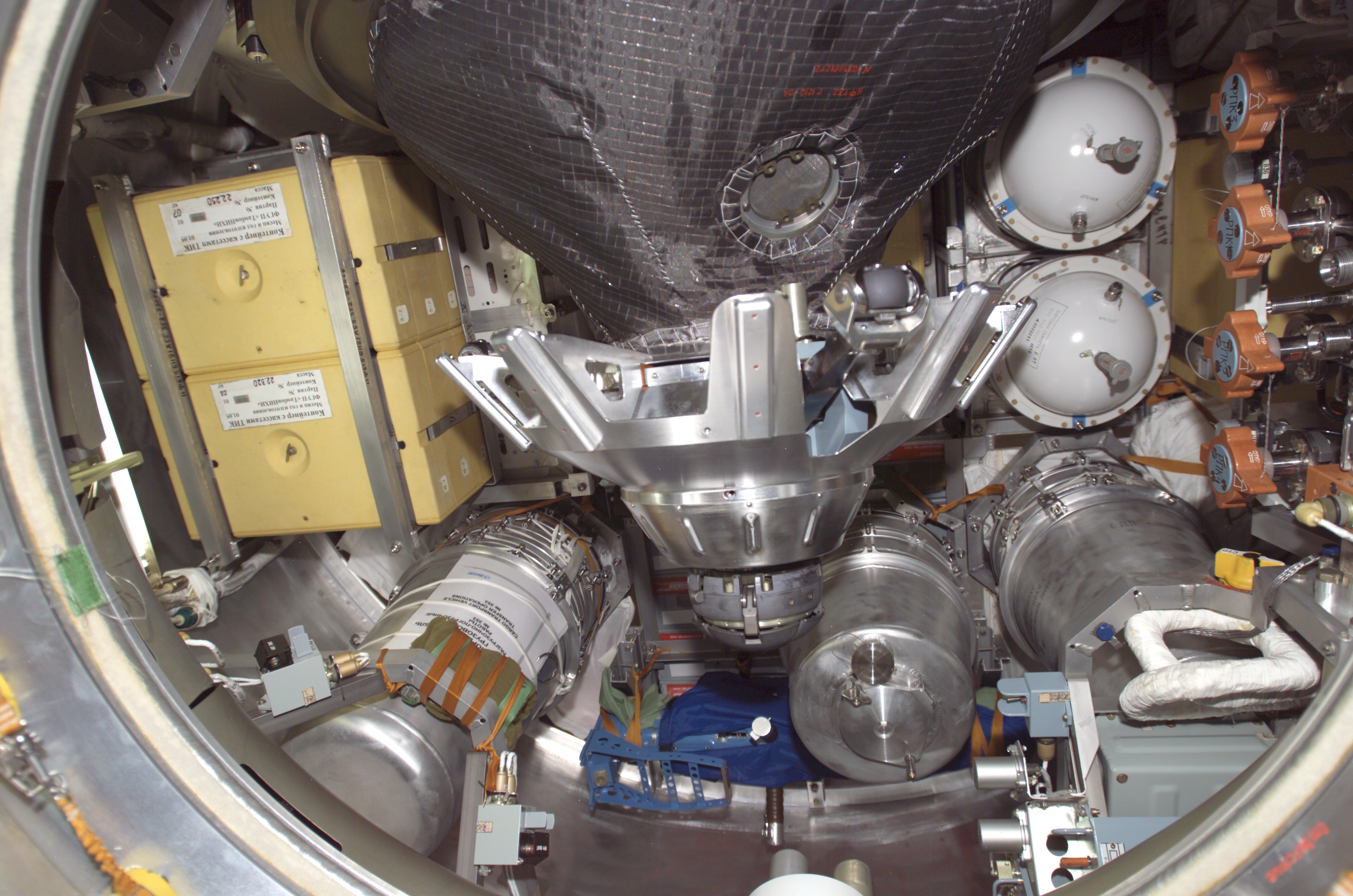
Interior of a Progress cargo section

A new modification of the Progress spacecraft, with new TsVM-101 digital flight computer and MBITS digital telemetry system, was first launched on 26 November 2008, at 12:38 UTC from the Kazakhstan's Baikonur Cosmodrome spaceport aboard a Russian Soyuz rocket. The first spacecraft of this series was Progress M-01M.

The spacecraft belongs to the so-called 400 series (GRAU: 11F615A60), and all modifications applied to it were subsequently used in the production of new Soyuz TMA-01M crewed spacecraft.

Progress M-27M was launched on 28 April 2015, but communication with the vessel was lost soon after, and it was destroyed as it re-entered the atmosphere on 8 May 2015. The last launch was Progress M-29M.

=== Progress M1 (2000–2004) ===
Progress M1 is another variant, capable of carrying more propellant (but less total cargo) to the ISS. There have been 11 of these flights.

- Mass: 7,150 kg (15,760 lb)
- Capacity cargo: 2,230 kg (4,920 lb)
- Capacity dry cargo: 1,800 kg (4,000 lb)
- Capacity propellant: 1,950 kg (4,300 lb)

=== Progress M2 ===
Progress M2 was a planned variant, which was a proposed design for the proposed Mir-2 space station, but was dropped due to financial issues. The M2 variant would have a larger service module for larger cargo or space station modules and would have been launched on a Zenit rocket as the spacecraft is bigger.

=== Progress MS (2015–present) ===
Progress MS (Modernized Systems) is an improved variant, largely focused on replacing pieces of outdated analogue equipment, many of which were no longer in production, with new digital systems. Key updates include a new flight control system, the new Kurs-NA rendezvous system, a new communications and telemetry system, additional micro-meteoroid protection, an improved docking mechanism, a digital camera system, and a CubeSat deployment platform. The first Progress MS flight launched on 21 December 2015.

== Current status ==
Progress spacecraft are used to resupply the International Space Station (ISS) as of 2021. Between 1 February 2003 and 26 July 2005, they were the only spacecraft available to transport large quantities of supplies to the station, as the Space Shuttle fleet was grounded after the breakup of Columbia at the end of STS-107. For ISS missions, the Progress M1 variant is used, which moves the water tanks from the propellant and refueling module to the pressurized section, and as a result is able to carry more propellant. Progress M-UM, the final flight of a Progress-M spacecraft, was launched 24 November 2021 on a Soyuz 2.1b. As of 7/1/2021, there have been 170 Progress flights to the ISS.

On 9 July 2018, Progress MS-09 broke a previous record by reaching the ISS in 3 hours and 48 minutes, carrying about 2,450 kg (5,400 lb) of cargo and supplies. It delivered food, fuel and supplies, including 705 kg of propellant, 50 kg (110 lb) of oxygen and air, 420 kg (930 lb) of water.

The European Space Agency (ESA) operated its own type of robotic supply freighter, the Automated Transfer Vehicle (ATV). The first of these, named Jules Verne, was launched at 04:03 UTC on 9 March 2008. ATVs can carry up to 8.85 tonnes of cargo into space, roughly three times as much as the Progress, and were launched annually by Ariane 5 rockets from 2011 to 2014 as part of ESA contribution to ISS upkeep. The design is adopted as the Service Module of the Orion spacecraft.

NASA's planned Orion spacecraft was initially designed to have an uncrewed variant of the Crew module similar to Progress; however, this capability was removed in 2009. As of 2023, SpaceX's Dragon spacecraft and Northrop Grumman's Cygnus spacecraft handle American logistics to the International Space Station.

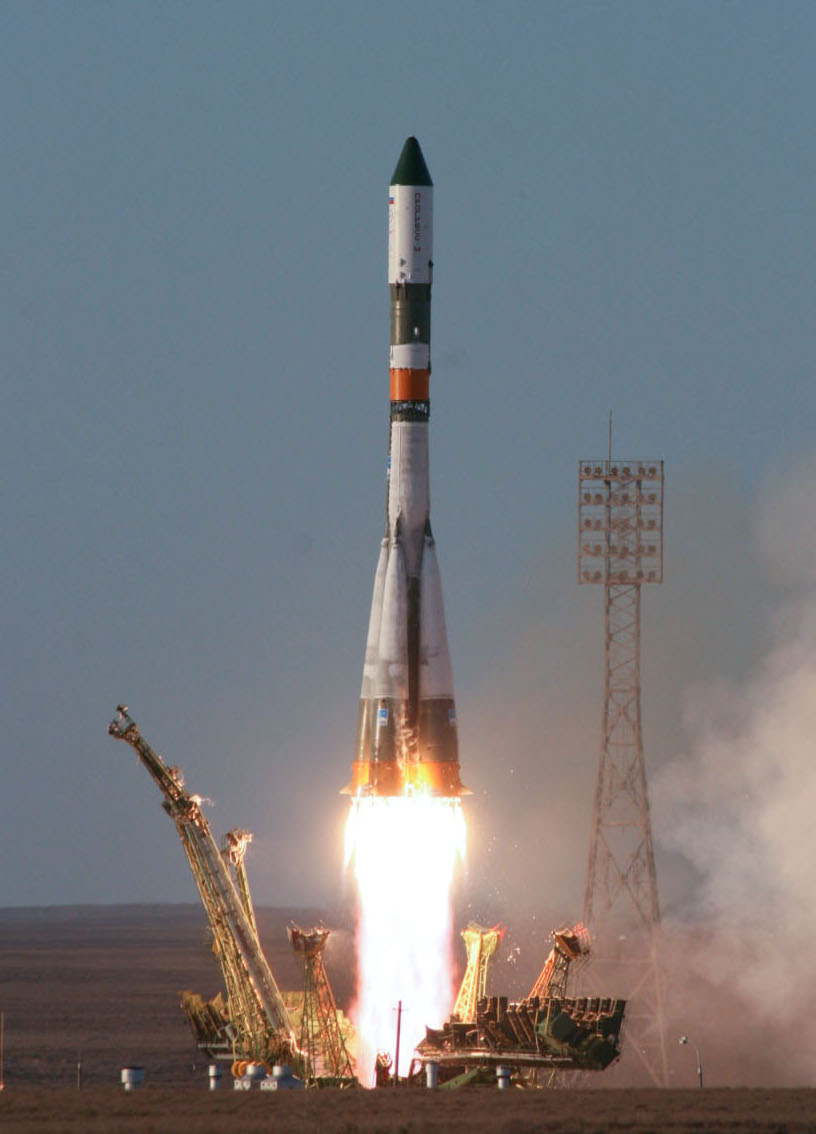
Launch of Progress M-11M

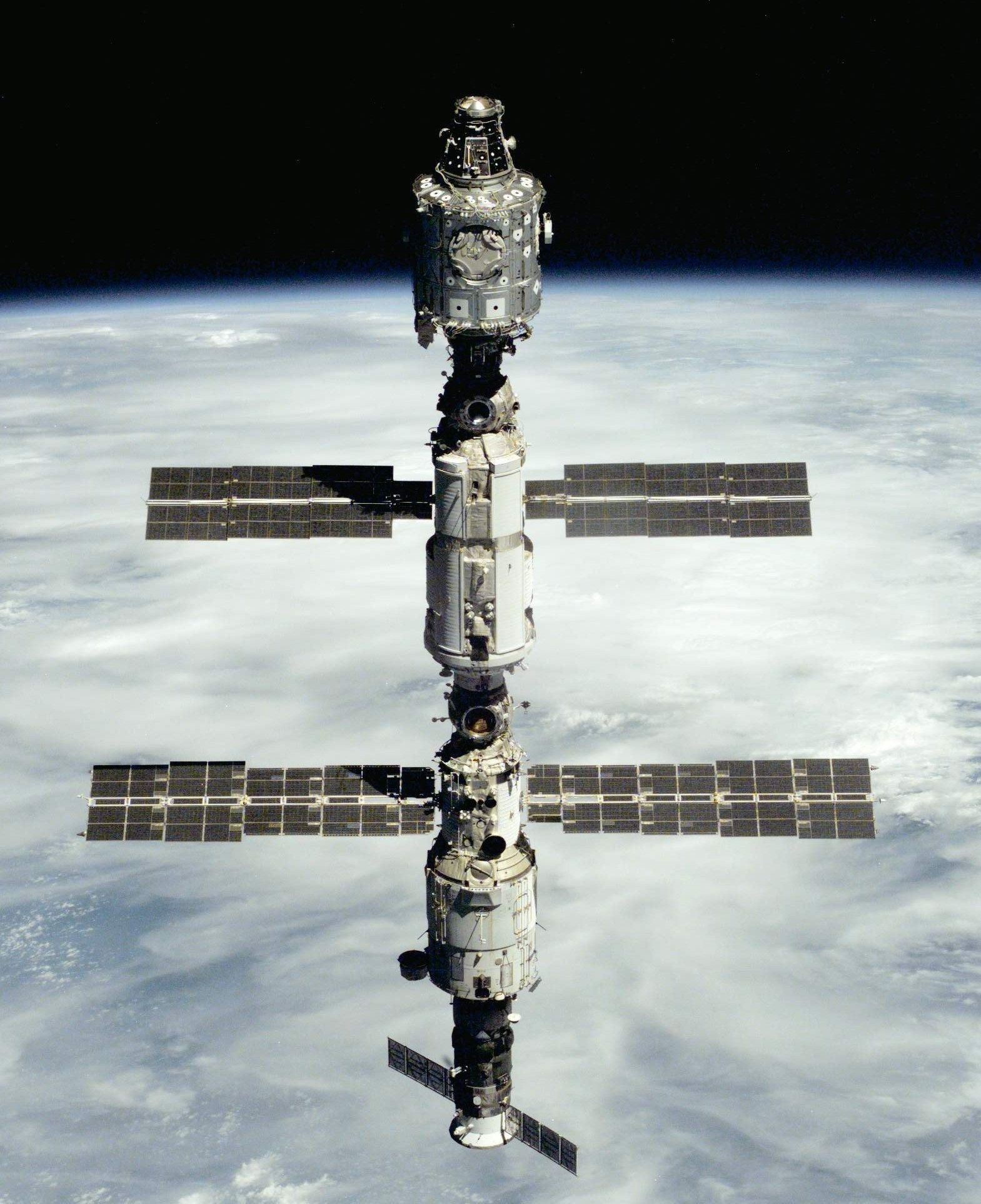
The Progress M1-3 seen docked at the bottom of the Zvezda module of the ISS during STS-106.

== Proposed replacement ==
Energia completed the design of a new cargo spacecraft, codenamed TGK PG, intended to take advantage of the increased payload capacity of the Soyuz-2.1b rocket. The design was a clean-sheet development and not based on either the Soyuz or Progress spacecraft. It was designed to transport approximately 2,400 kilograms (5,300 lb) of cargo in 18 square metres (190 sq ft), about 600 kilograms (1,300 lb) and 11 square metres (120 sq ft) more than Progress. In contrast to the Progress design, which uses separate refuelling and propulsion modules, the spacecraft would have used a shared propellant tank system, reducing weight and allowing a greater proportion of propellant to be transferred. The project did not progress beyond the preliminary design phase due to a lack of funding from Roscosmos.

== See also ==
- List of Progress flights
- Uncrewed spaceflights to the International Space Station
- Comparison of space station cargo vehicles
- Cargo spacecraft – Spacecraft without people on board
  - Automated Transfer Vehicle – Uncrewed cargo spacecraft developed by the European Space Agency
  - Cygnus (spacecraft) – Uncrewed cargo spacecraft developed by Orbital Sciences
  - SpaceX Dragon – Family of SpaceX spacecraft
  - H-II Transfer Vehicle – Uncrewed cargo spacecraft developed by JAXA
- Orbital Technologies Commercial Space Station
