= Anthony Dias =

Anthony Dias may refer to:

- Anthony Lancelot Dias (1910–2002), Indian Civil Service officer and politician
- Anthony J. Dias, American materials scientist
