= Soyuz TMA-20 =

2010 Russian crewed spaceflight to the ISS

- Operator: Roscosmos
- COSPAR ID: 2010-067A
- SATCAT no.: 37254
- Mission duration: 159 days, 7 hours, 17 minutes,

Spacecraft properties
- Spacecraft type: Soyuz-TMA 11F732
- Manufacturer: Energia

Crew
- Crew size: 3
- Members: Dmitri Kondratyev; Catherine Coleman; Paolo Nespoli
- Callsign: Варяг ("Varangian")

Start of mission
- Launch date: December 15, 2010, 19:09 UTC
- Rocket: Soyuz-FG
- Launch site: Baikonur 1/5

End of mission
- Landing date: May 24, 2011, 02:27 UTC

Orbital parameters
- Reference system: Geocentric
- Regime: Low Earth

Docking with ISS
- Docking port: Rassvet nadir
- Docking date: 17 December 2010; 20:12 UTC
- Undocking date: 23 May 2011; 21:35 UTC
- Time docked: 157d 1h 23m
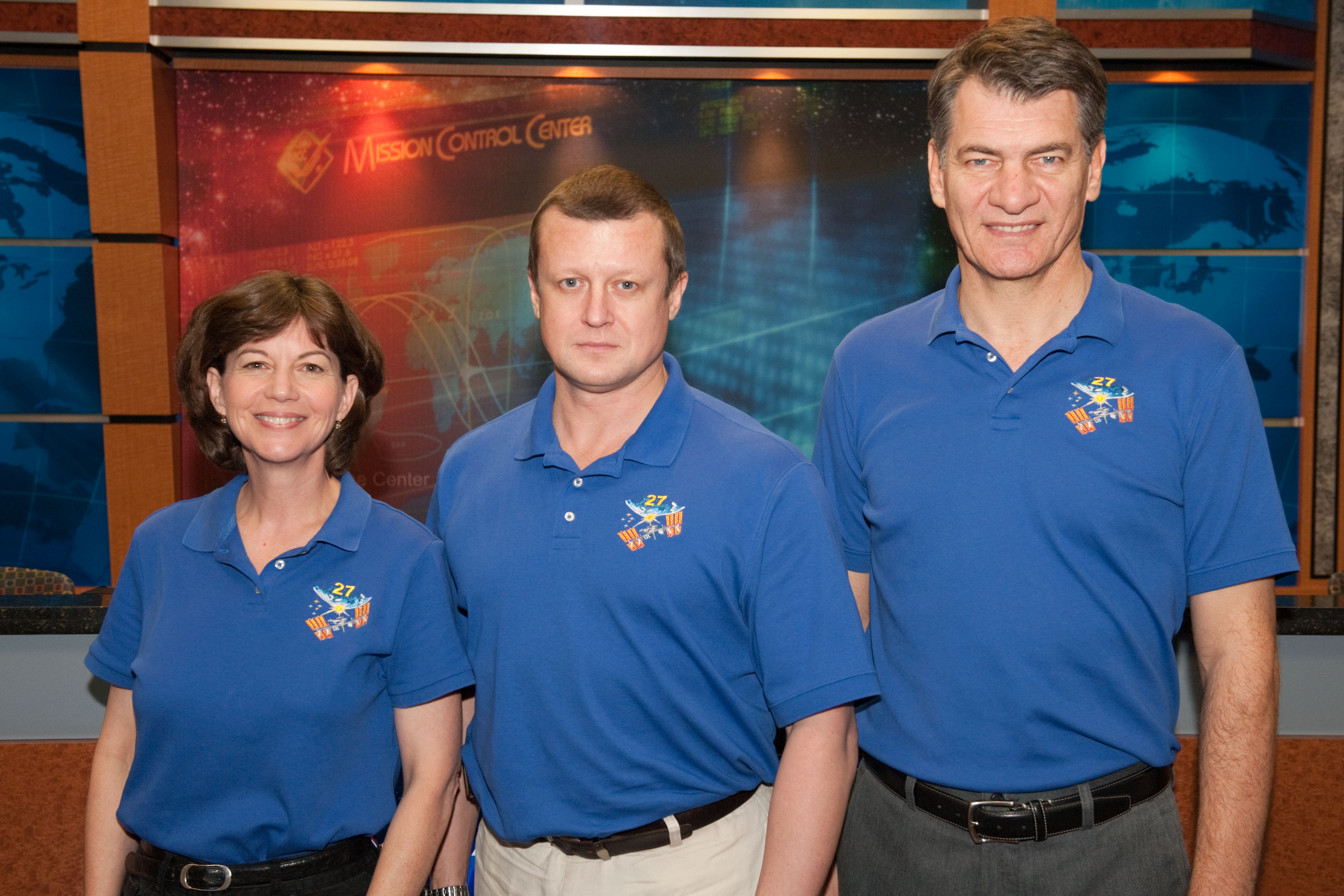
- From left to right: Coleman, Kondratyev and Nespoli Soyuz programme (Crewed missions)

Soyuz TMA-20 was a human spaceflight to the International Space Station (ISS) and was part of the Soyuz programme. It lifted off from the Baikonur Cosmodrome in Kazakhstan on December 15, 2010, and docked with the ISS two days later. On May 24, 2011, after spending 159 days in space, the Soyuz TMA-20 descent module landed safely in Zhezkazgan, Kazakhstan, carrying Kondratyev, Coleman and Nespoli.

The three-person crew of Soyuz TMA-20 – Dmitri Kondratyev, Catherine Coleman and Paolo Nespoli – represented the ISS partner organizations of Roscosmos, NASA, and the European Space Agency (ESA). Soyuz TMA-20's crew represented half of the members of Expedition 27; the other three members of the expedition arrived at the station on board Soyuz TMA-21 on April 6, 2011. The COSPAR ID of Soyuz TMA-20 was 2010-067A. It was ISS flight 25S. The European segment of the mission was called "MagISStra".

== Crew ==
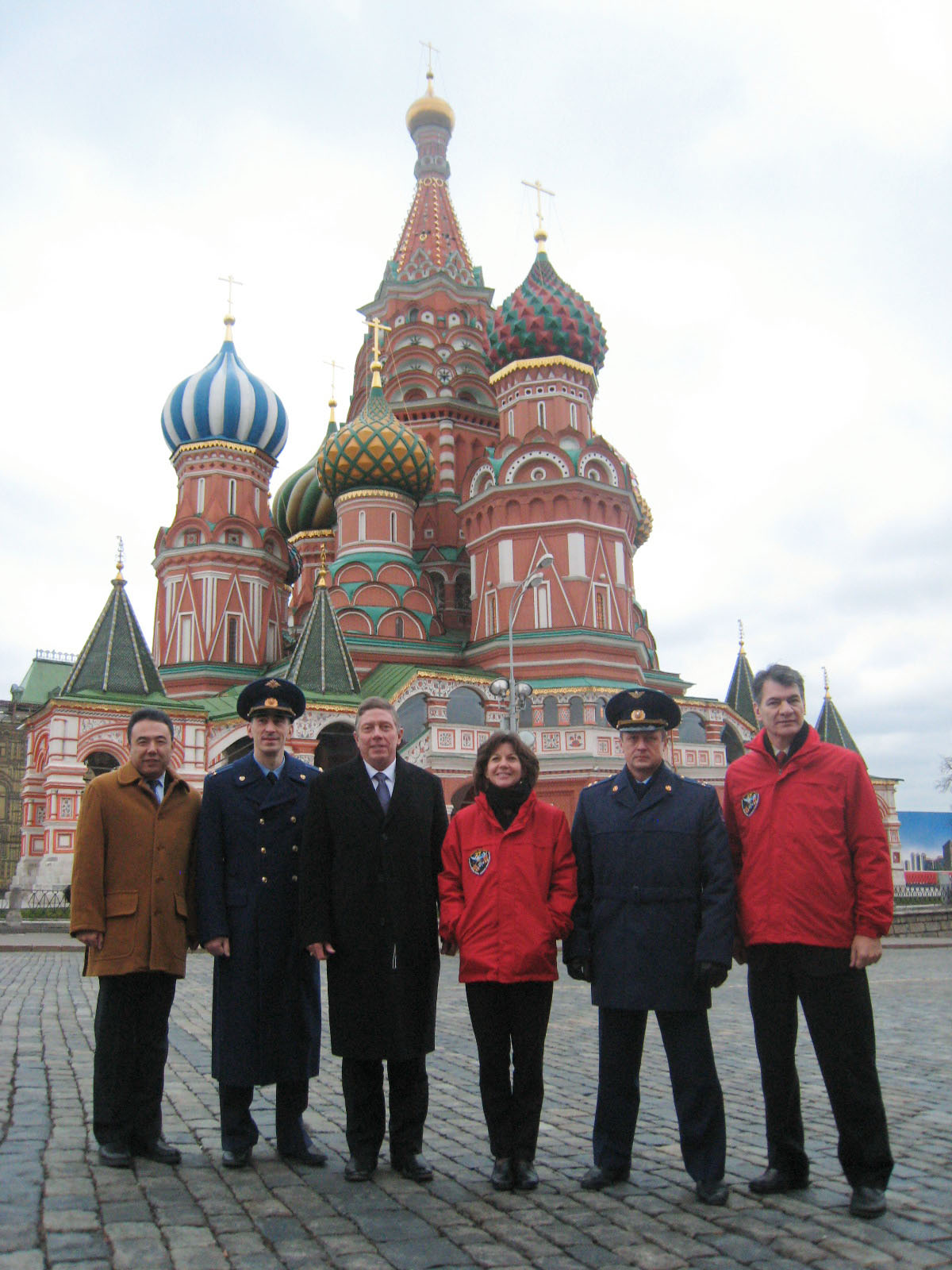
The Soyuz TMA-20 prime and backup crews conduct their ceremonial tour of Red Square on November 26, 2010.

The Soyuz TMA-20 crew was confirmed by NASA on November 21, 2008.

Position	Crew Member
Commander	(Russia) Dmitri Kondratyev, Roscosmos; Expedition 26; Only spaceflight
Flight Engineer 1	(Italy) Paolo A. Nespoli, ESA; Expedition 26; Second spaceflight
Flight Engineer 2	(United States) Catherine Coleman, NASA; Expedition 26; Third and last spaceflight

=== Backup crew ===
Position	Crew Member
Commander	(Russia) Anatoli Ivanishin, Roscosmos
Flight Engineer 1	(Japan) Satoshi Furukawa, JAXA
Flight Engineer 2	(United States) Michael Fossum, NASA

=== Tallest-ever crew member ===
European astronaut Paolo Nespoli was believed to have been the tallest crew member to date ever to fly aboard a Soyuz spacecraft, with a height of 188 centimeters (6 ft 2in). According to the president of Energia, Vitaly Lopota, a custom-built seat and related hardware had to be manufactured to accommodate Nespoli's height.

== Transportation damage ==
The Soyuz spacecraft suffered damage to its container during transport to the Baikonur Cosmodrome on October 5, 2010, according to the Interfax news agency. Engineers spotted the damage after the spacecraft was shipped by rail from Russia to Kazakhstan. After initial inspections of the damage, Russian sources said that it was not immediately clear whether the spacecraft would have to be returned to the RKK Energia factory in Moscow. Later, Russian officials replaced the damaged descent module with a new one, flown to Baikonur aboard a cargo plane. The replacement module was originally part of the Soyuz TMA-21 spacecraft.

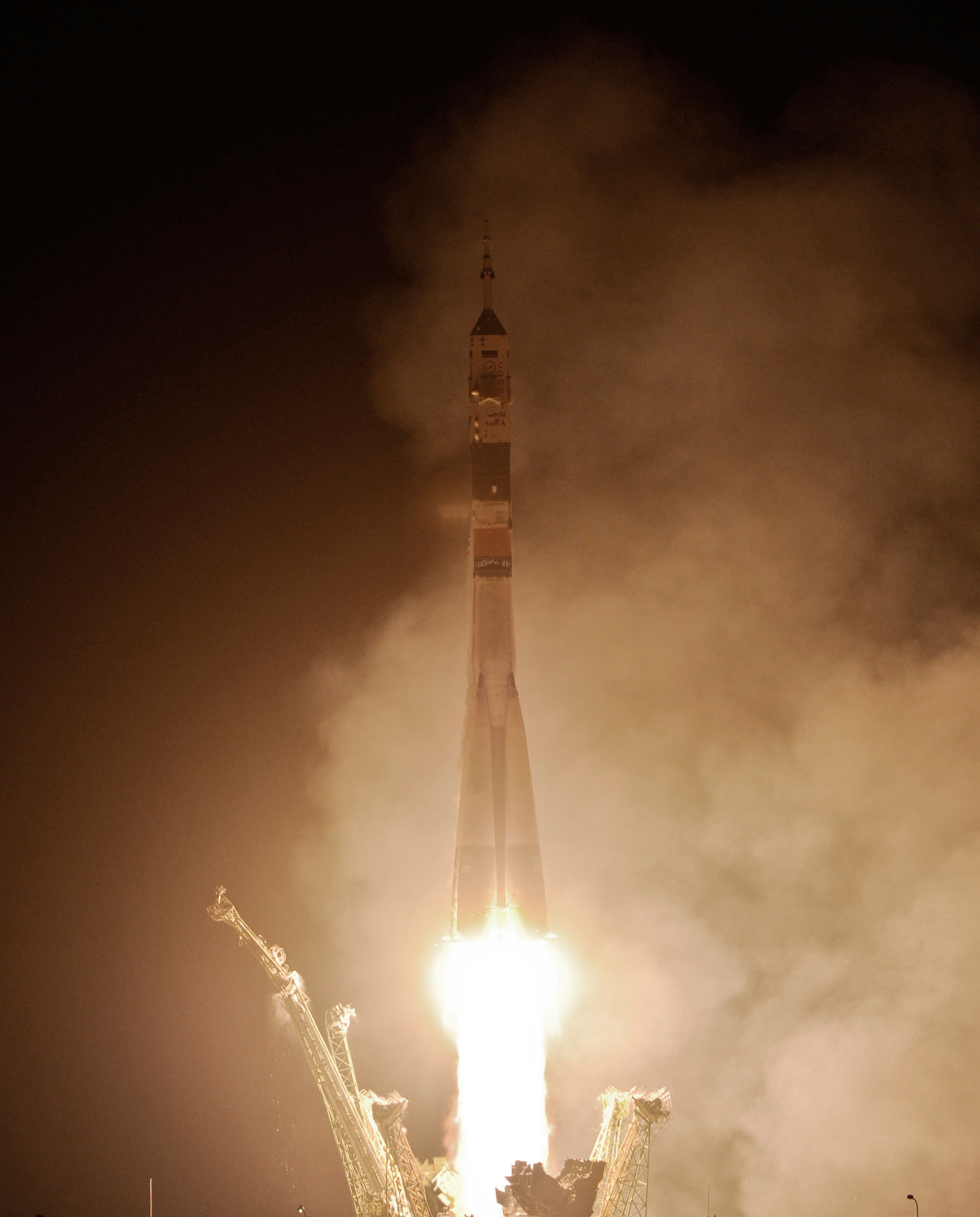
The Soyuz TMA-20 rocket launches from the Baikonur Cosmodrome carrying Kondratyev, Coleman and Nespoli to the International Space Station.

Despite the transportation damage, RKK Energia president Vitaly Lopota told news media that the mission would take place in December as planned. Roscosmos spokesman Alexander Vorobyov also told Interfax that the December launch date would not be affected, because a reserve spacecraft would be available at Baikonur for the mission, if required.

== Launch and docking ==
=== Launch ===
On December 12, 2010, the Soyuz TMA-20 payload section was integrated with the Soyuz FG rocket and the emergency escape system, allowing the state commission to declare that the Soyuz TMA-20 mission was fully assembled. Rollout to the launch pad began in the morning of December 13, 2010.

Soyuz TMA-20 blasted off from Baikonur Cosmodrome's Site 1 at 19:09 GMT (22:09:25 Moscow Time) on December 15, 2010, and successfully reached orbit ten minutes later.

=== Docking ===
The Soyuz TMA-20 spacecraft docked with the Rassvet module's docking port at 20:12 GMT on December 17, 2010. The docking occurred as the space station flew over western Africa at an altitude of 224 miles.

In preparation for the day's docking procedure, the automated rendezvous sequence aboard Soyuz TMA-20 began at about 17:49 GMT. The spacecraft's engines were fired at 18:09 GMT, and another impulse firing occurred around 18:28 GMT. Within minutes, the Kurs rendezvous equipment on both the Soyuz and the ISS was activated to support the linkup. The television camera on the nose of the Soyuz spacecraft was turned on at 19:29 GMT to provide views of the docking.

After checking that there were no leaks between the two spacecraft, the hatch between Soyuz TMA-20 and the space station was opened at 23:02 GMT. A welcome ceremony to mark the arrival of the new crew was held shortly after the new crew came on board, when the live television downlink communications session started.

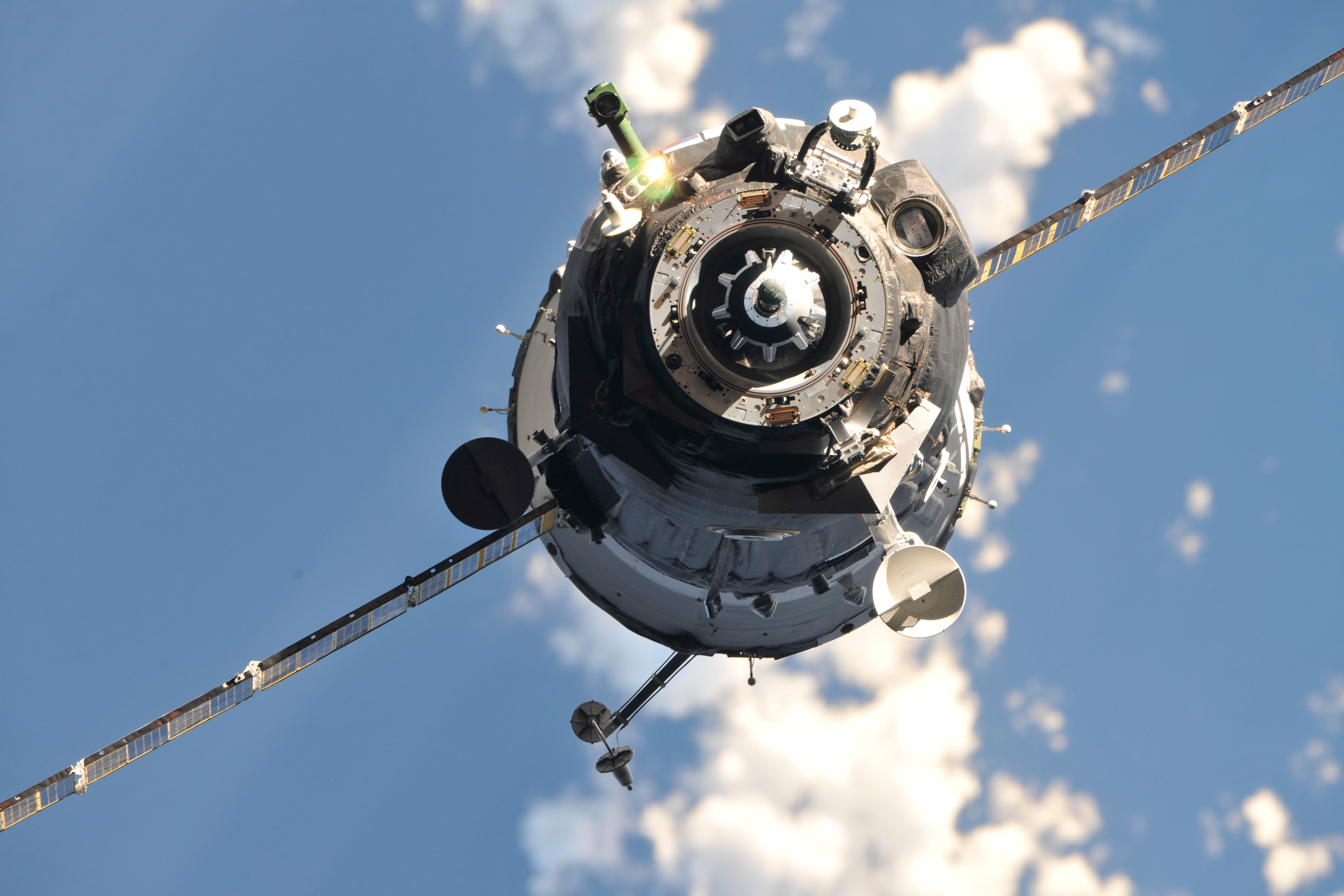
The Soyuz TMA-20 spacecraft approaches the International Space Station

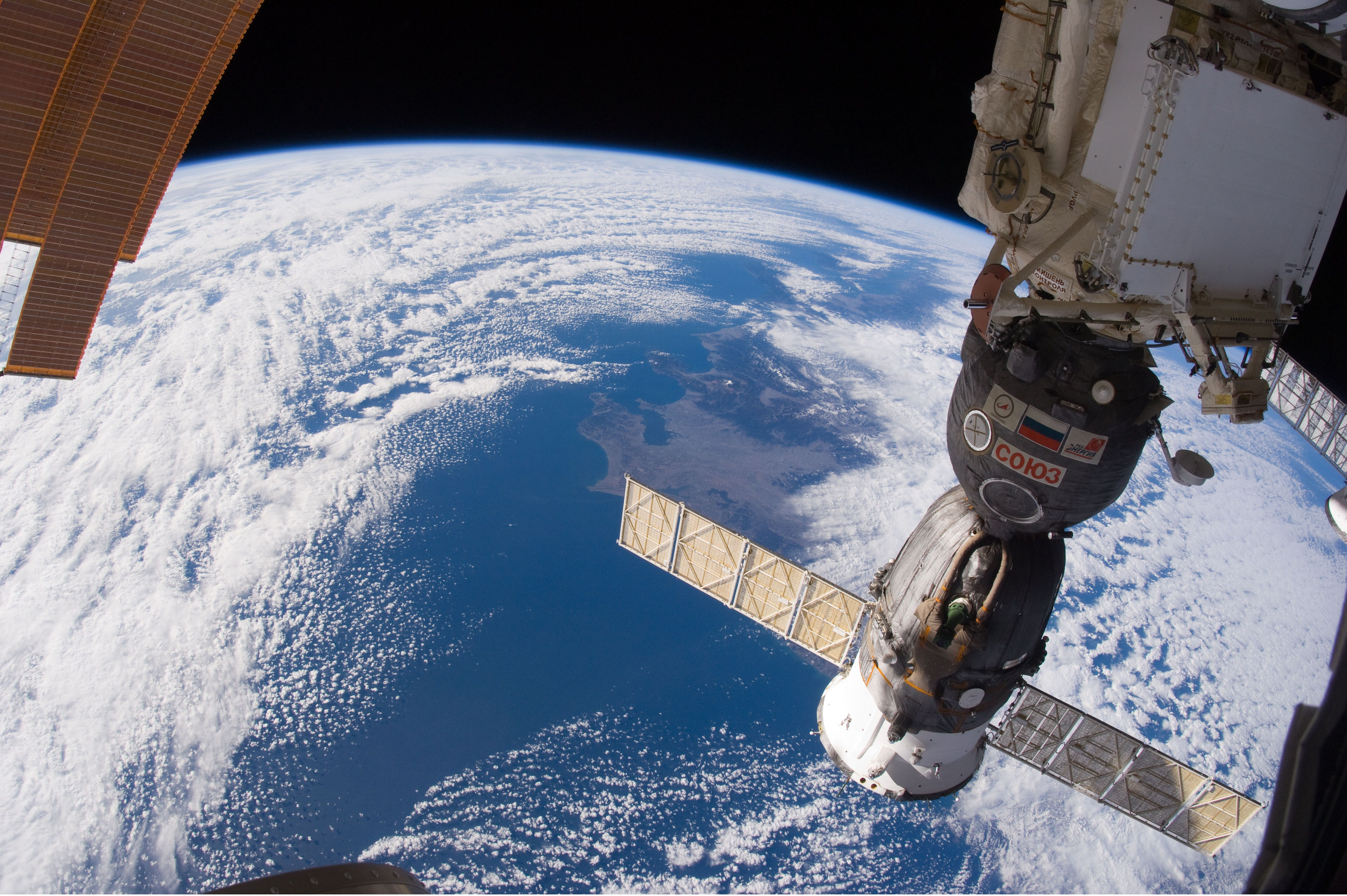
Soyuz TMA-20 spacecraft docked to the Rassvet module

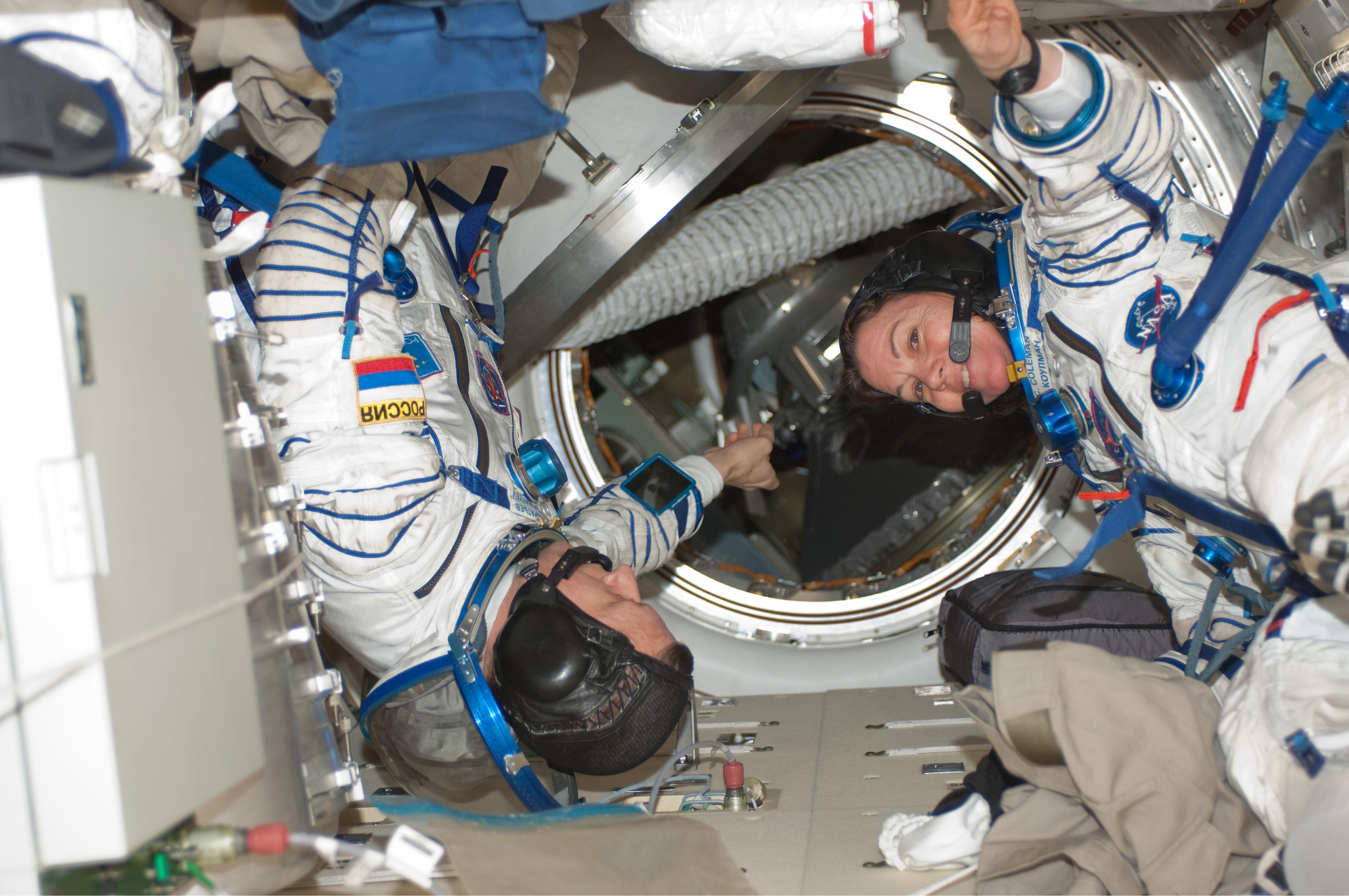
Kondratyev and Coleman prepare to perform a fit check inside the Soyuz

== Undocking and landing ==
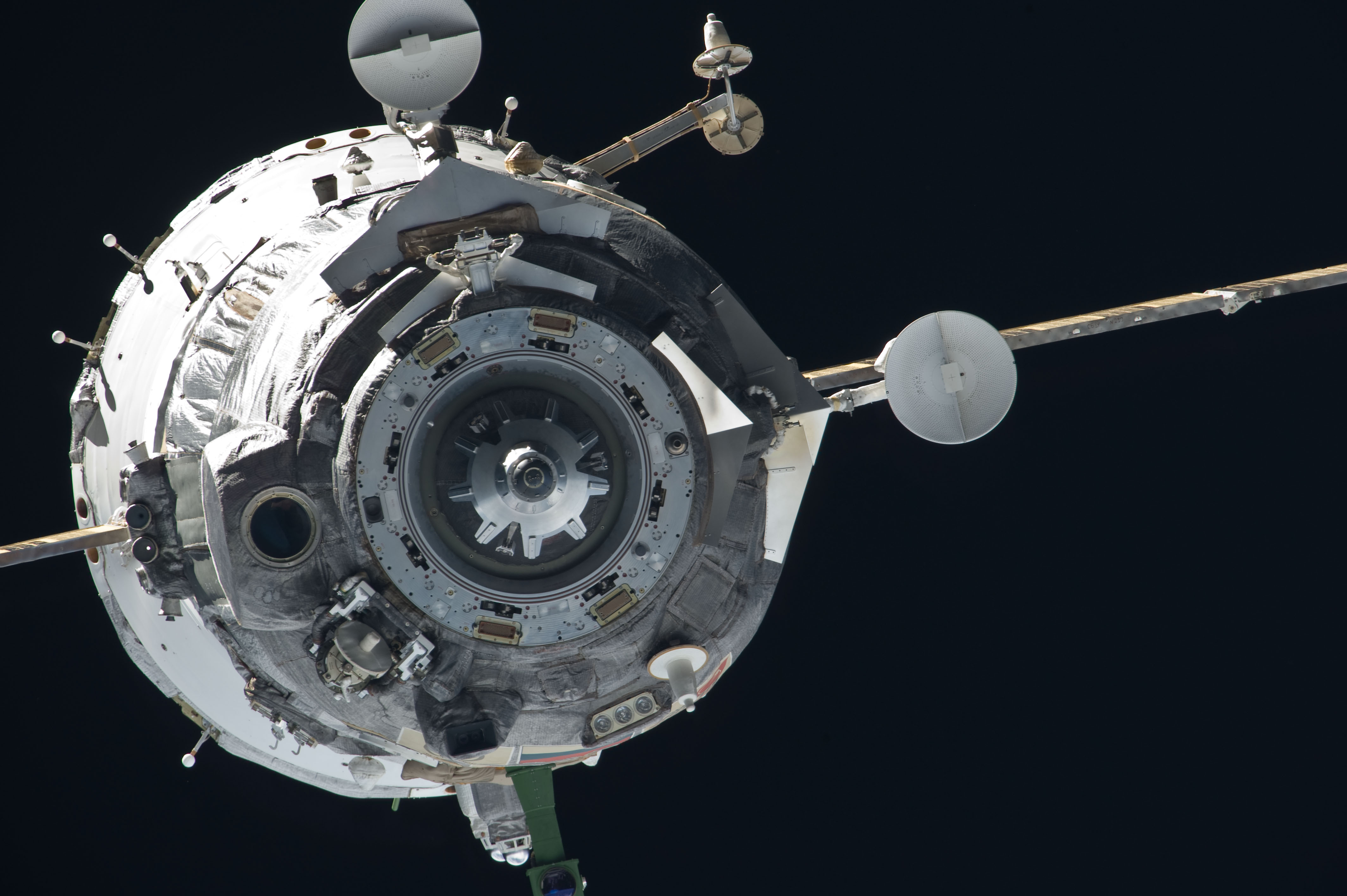
The Soyuz spacecraft departs the Space Station on May 23, 2011.

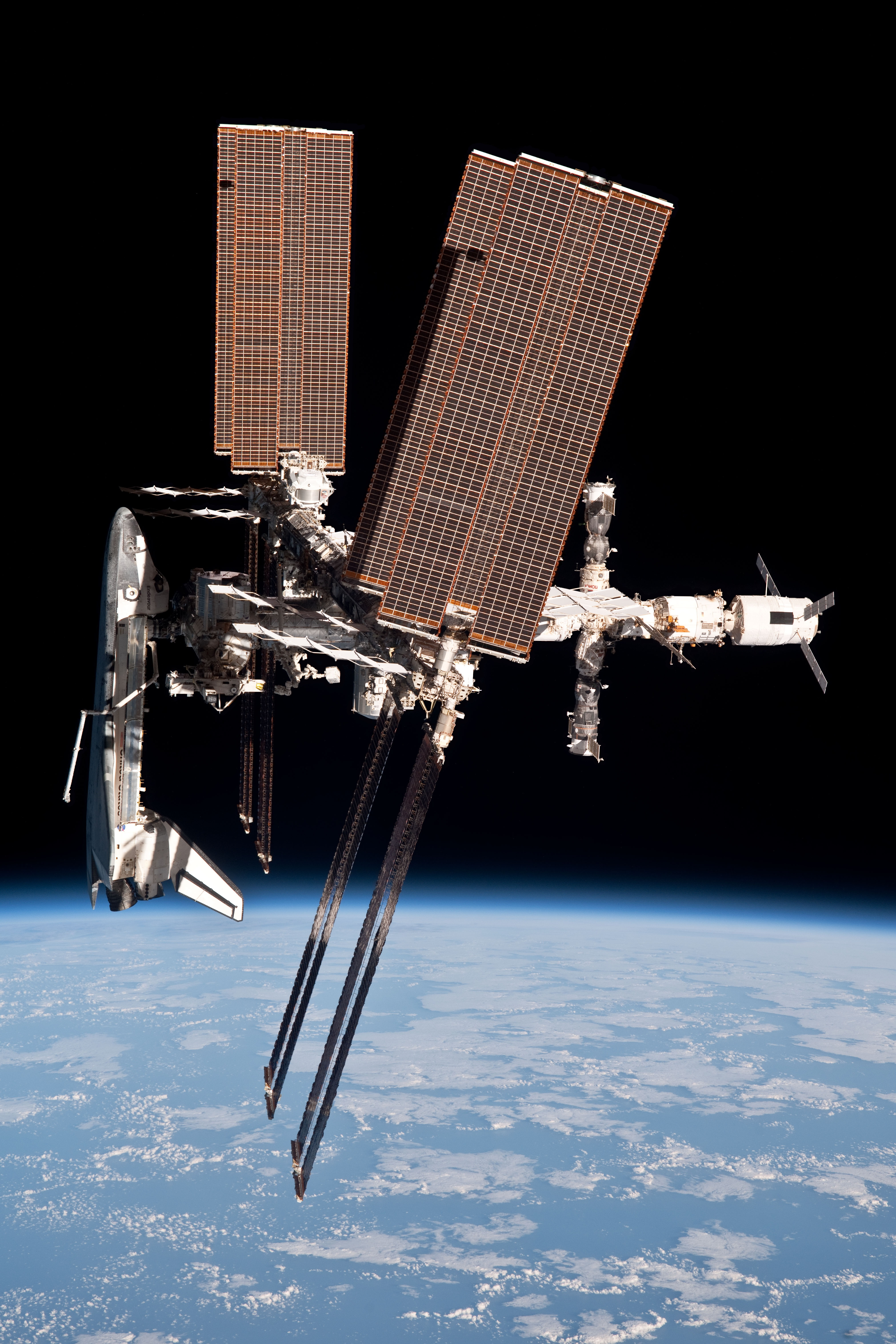
A unique view of the ISS and Space Shuttle Endeavour from the Soyuz

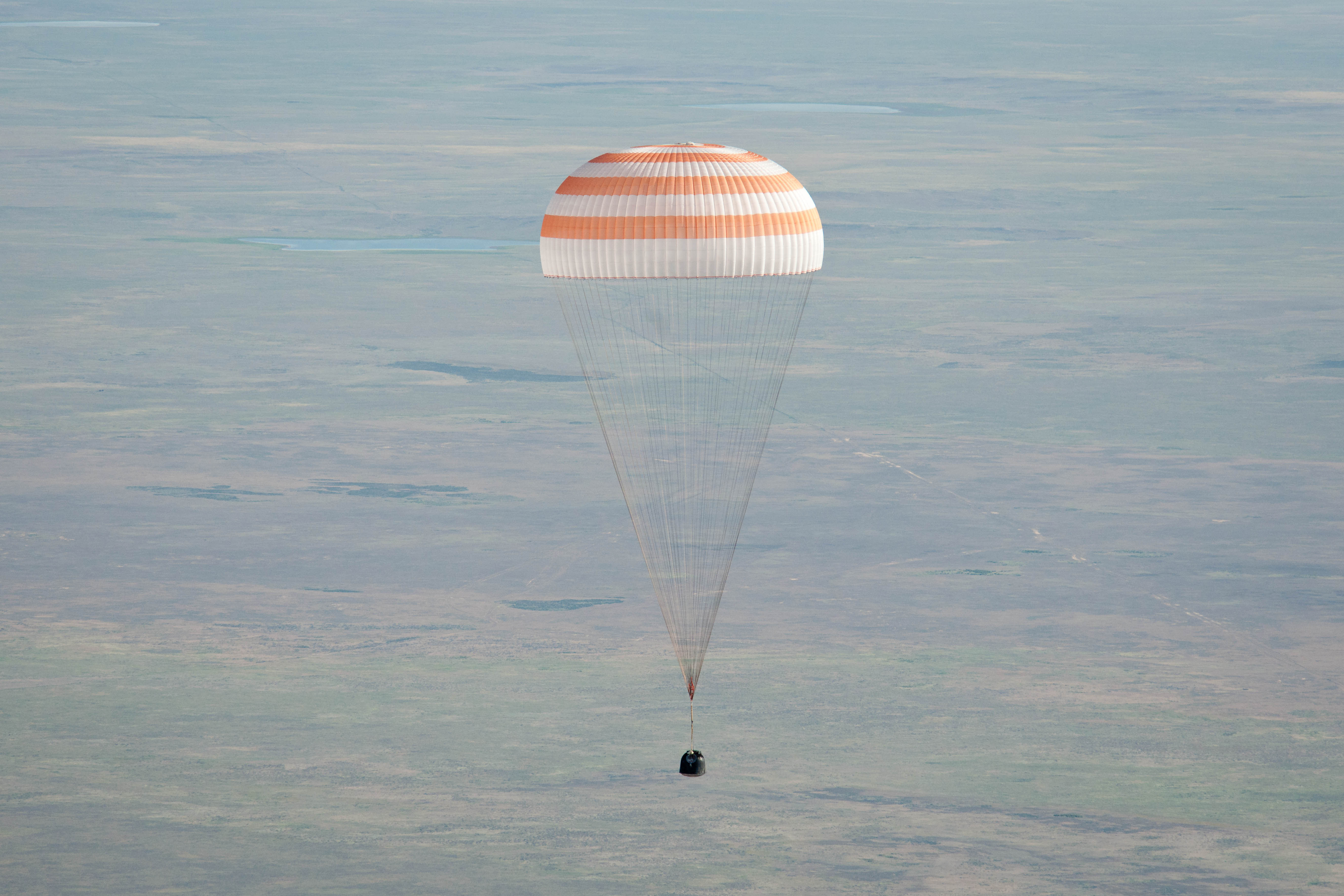
The Soyuz TMA-20 capsule descends toward landing.

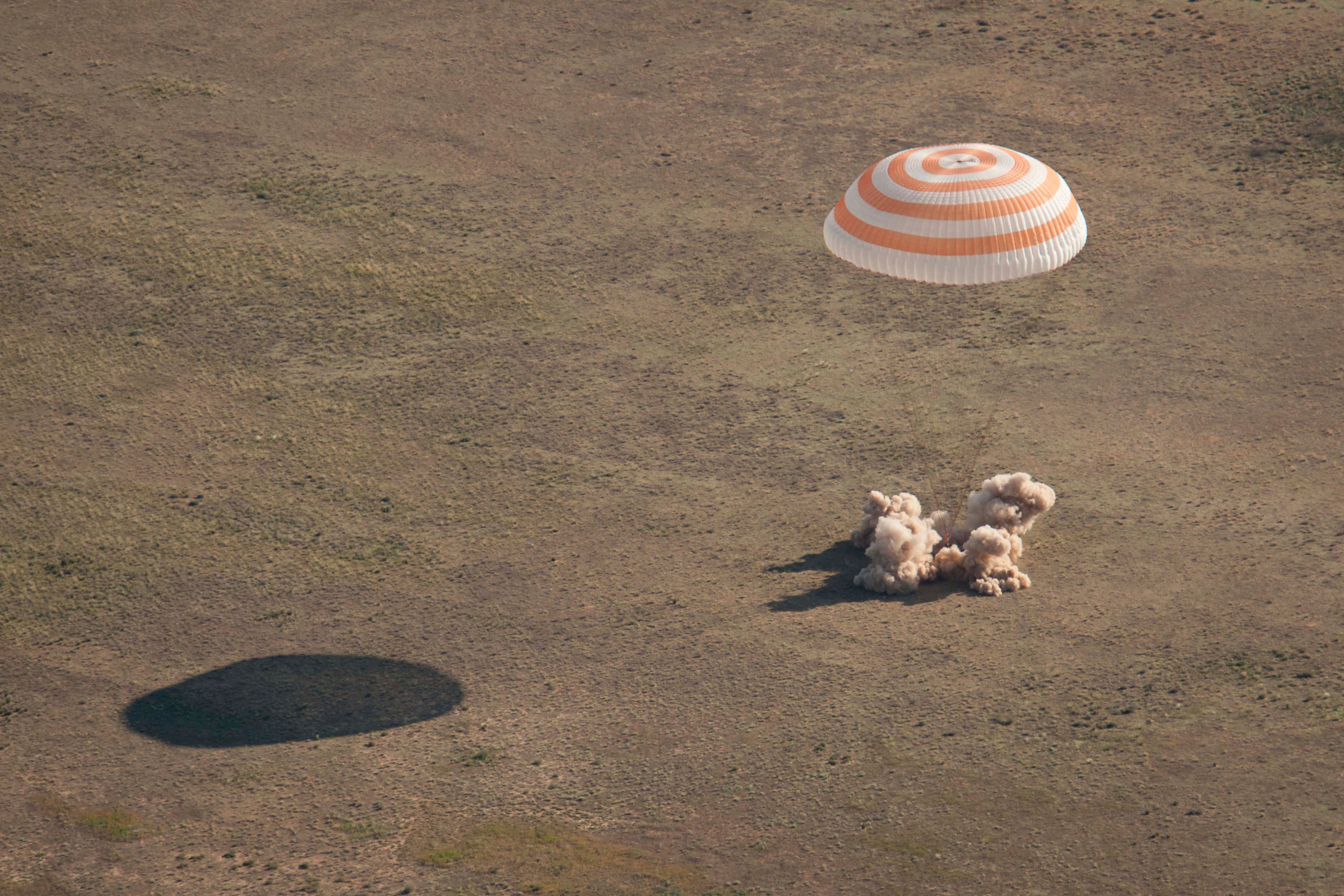
The Soyuz TMA-20 spacecraft lands in Zhezkazgan, Kazakhstan.

Video of the Soyuz TMA-20 spacecraft landing in Zhezkazgan, Kazakhstan.

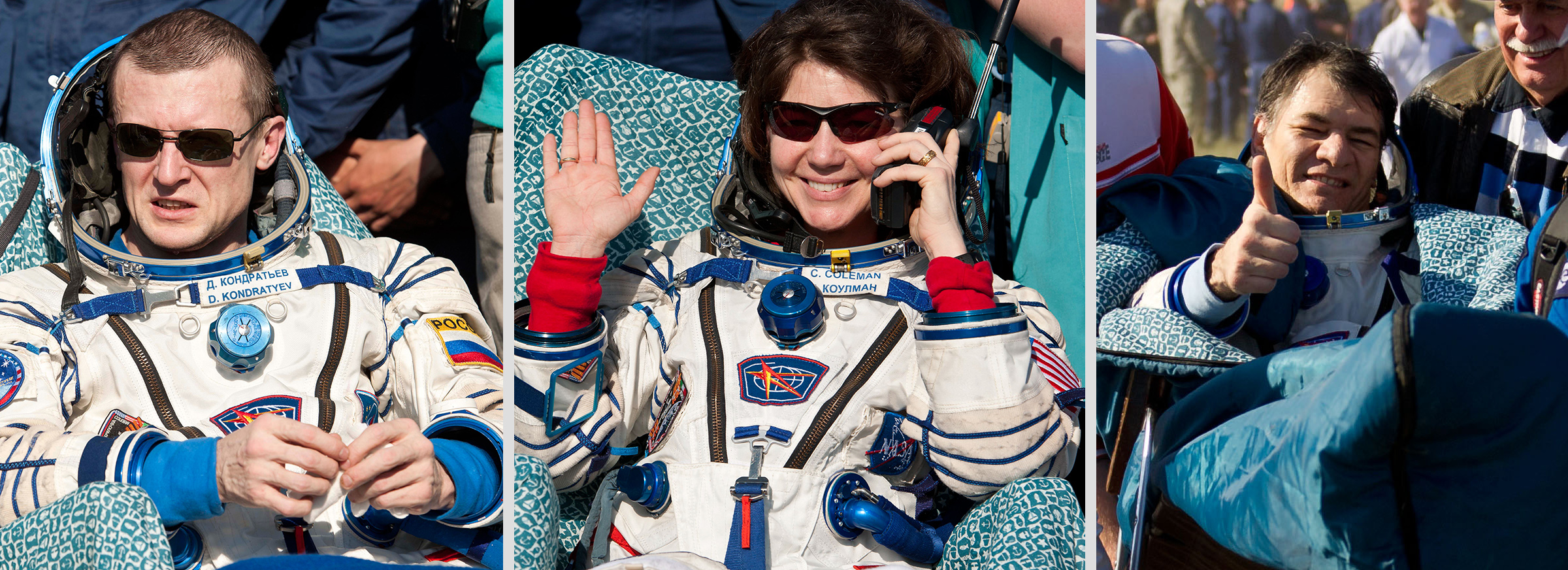
The Soyuz crew is pictured shortly after landing.

This was a textbook entry for Dmitry Kondratyev, Paolo Nespoli and Cady Coleman. "All of the functions of the Soyuz TMA-20 were by the book, no issues reported. – NASA MCC Commentator Rob Navias

After spending 157 days docked to the ISS, the Soyuz TMA-20 spacecraft, with Russian cosmonaut Dmitri Kondratyev at the controls, undocked from the Rassvet module at 21:35 UTC on May 23, 2011. The ISS was flying above eastern China at the time separated. Kondratyev occupied the center seat, with NASA astronaut Catherine Coleman to his right, and ESA astronaut Paolo Nespoli to his left.

Kondratyev backed the spacecraft away from the ISS by about 600 feet and paused to give Nespoli a photo opportunity. Starting about 15 minutes after undocking, holding station at that vantage point directly behind the ISS, Nespoli took numerous photographs and several minutes of high-definition video of the station and the then-docked Space Shuttle Endeavour, which was conducting its final mission, STS-134. The hatch between Soyuz TMA-20's descent and habitation modules, which was closed during undocking, was re-opened for the photo shoot, and Nespoli photographed the station-shuttle complex through a porthole in the habitation module. At 21:55 UTC, the ISS began to slowly rotate by 129 degrees to provide Nespoli with the best lighting conditions and a side-on view of Endeavour. Nespoli spent about 25 minutes completing the photo survey, then removed the digital photo memory cards from his cameras and made his way back into the Soyuz descent module. Once Nespoli was strapped into the seat to the left of Kondratyev's, the descent-habitation module hatch was sealed, and the Soyuz spacecraft performed a separation burn at 22:15 UTC to increase its distance from the ISS.

Flying over the southern Atlantic Ocean, the Soyuz executed its deorbit burn at 01:36 UTC on May 24. The deorbit burn was a four-minute, 16-second firing. The descent, habitation and propulsion modules making up the spacecraft separated at 02:01 UTC. The descent module, with the crew inside, reached the first traces of the Earth's atmosphere at an altitude of about 62 miles at 02:03 UTC.

The re-entry was conducted without any significant problems. In stark contrast to the frigid cold temperatures prevailed on the previous Soyuz TMA-01M landing day, the weather this time was sunny and warm. Soyuz TMA-20's large parachute and smaller drogue chute inflated as planned, and the spacecraft descended towards its landing zone near Dzhezkazgan in Kazakhstan. The safe landing of the descent module was supervised by Russian Search and Recovery forces on board three Antonov 12 and Antonov 26 planes, 14 Mi-8 helicopters and seven search and recovery vehicles, deployed in the landing zone. The final moments of the touchdown were recorded by NASA TV, with live landing footage and commentary.

The Soyuz TMA-20 spacecraft landed safely upright at 02:27 UTC on May 24, 2011, after a mission lasting 159 days, seven hours and 17 minutes. Russian recovery forces moved to assist the Soyuz crew, along with U.S. and Russian flight surgeons. Kondratyev and Coleman appeared to be in good shape, smiling and chatting with support personnel and sharing a satellite phone to call family members back home. However, at a press conference held after the landing, Vyacheslav Rogozhkin, the deputy head of Federal Medical and Biological Agency, said that Naspoli was suffering from a minor health issue with his vestibular system.

The crew was flown from the landing site to Karaganda to undergo medical checks. In Karaganda, Coleman and Nespoli boarded a waiting NASA Gulfstream jet for a flight back to NASA's Johnson Space Center in Houston. Kontratyev was flown on a GCTC Tupolev Tu-134 back to Chkalovsky airfield of the Gagarin Cosmonaut Training Center at Zvezdny Gorodok.
