= Catherine Coleman =

American astronaut, chemist, engineer and USAF colonel (born 1960)

Cady Coleman
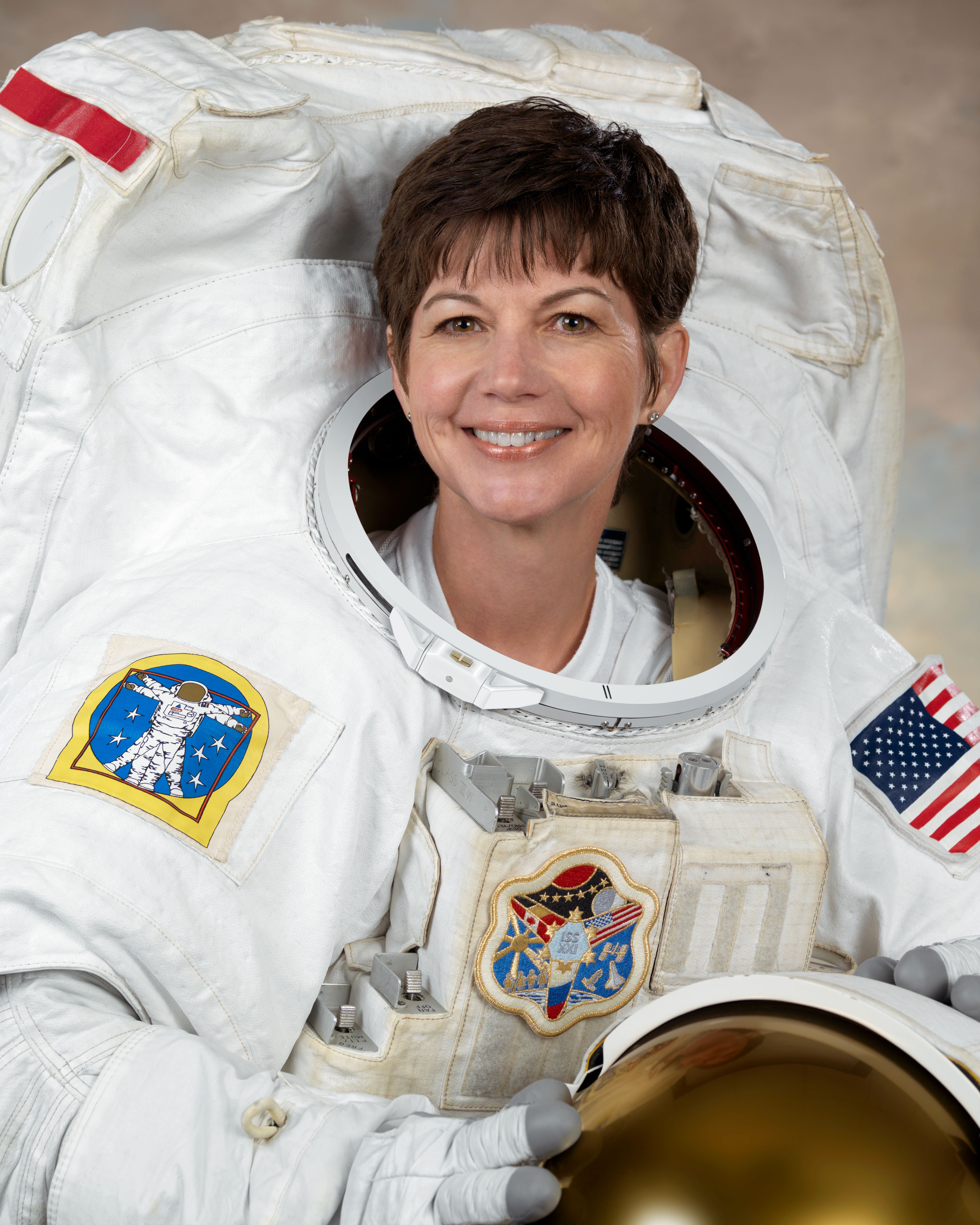
- Coleman in 2009
- Born: Catherine Grace Coleman; December 14, 1960 (age 65); Charleston, South Carolina, U.S.
- Education: Massachusetts Institute of Technology (BS); University of Massachusetts, Amherst (MS, PhD)
- Space career

NASA astronaut
- Rank: Colonel, USAF (ret.)
- Time in space: 180d 4h 0m
- Selection: NASA Group 14 (1992)
- Missions: STS-73; STS-93; Soyuz TMA-20 (Expedition 26/27)

Catherine Grace "Cady" Coleman (born December 14, 1960) is an American chemist, engineer, former United States Air Force colonel, and retired NASA astronaut. She is a veteran of two Space Shuttle missions, and departed the International Space Station on May 23, 2011, as a crew member of Expedition 27 after logging 159 days in space.

== Education ==
Coleman graduated from Wilbert Tucker Woodson High School, Fairfax, Virginia, in 1978. In 1978–1979, she was an exchange student at Røyken Upper Secondary School in Norway with the AFS Intercultural Programs. She received a B.S. degree in chemistry from the Massachusetts Institute of Technology (MIT) in 1983 and was commissioned as graduate of the Air Force Reserve Officer Training Corps (Air Force ROTC)., then received a Ph.D. degree in polymer science and engineering from the University of Massachusetts Amherst in 1991. She was advised by Professor Thomas J. McCarthy on her doctorate. As an undergraduate, she was a member of the intercollegiate rowing crew and was a resident of Baker House.

== Military career ==
Coleman continued to pursue her PhD at the University of Massachusetts Amherst as a second lieutenant. In 1988, she entered active duty at Wright-Patterson Air Force Base as a research chemist. During her work, she participated as a surface analysis consultant on the NASA Long Duration Exposure Facility experiment. In 1991, she received her doctorate in polymer science and engineering. She retired from the Air Force in November 2009 as a colonel.

== NASA career ==
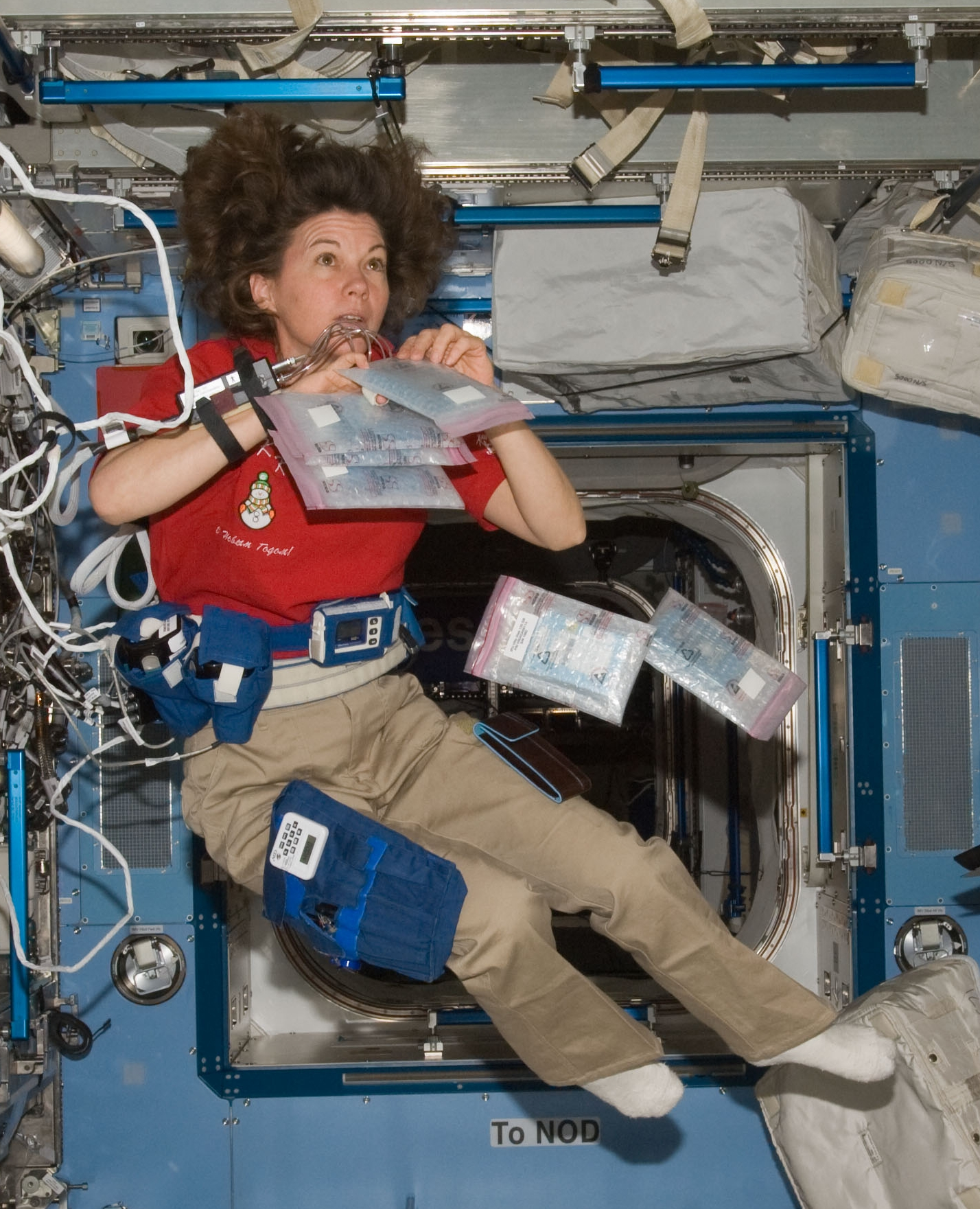
Coleman in the ISS in 2011

Coleman was selected by NASA in 1992 to join the NASA Astronaut Corps. In 1995, she was a member of the STS-73 crew on the scientific mission USML-2 with experiments including biotechnology, combustion science, and the physics of fluids. STS-93 was Coleman's second space flight in 1999. She was mission specialist in charge of deploying the Chandra X-ray Observatory and its Inertial Upper Stage out of the shuttle's cargo bay.

Coleman served as Chief of Robotics for the Astronaut Office, to include robotic arm operations and training for all Space Shuttle and International Space Station missions. In October 2004, Coleman served as an aquanaut during the NEEMO 7 mission aboard the Aquarius underwater laboratory, living and working underwater for eleven days.

Coleman was assigned as a backup U.S. crew member for Expeditions 19, 20 and 21 and served as a backup crew member for Expeditions 24 and 25 as part of her training for Expedition 26.

Coleman launched on December 15, 2010 (December 16, 2010 Baikonur time), aboard Soyuz TMA-20 to join the Expedition 26 mission aboard the International Space Station. She retired from NASA on December 1, 2016.

=== Spaceflight experience ===
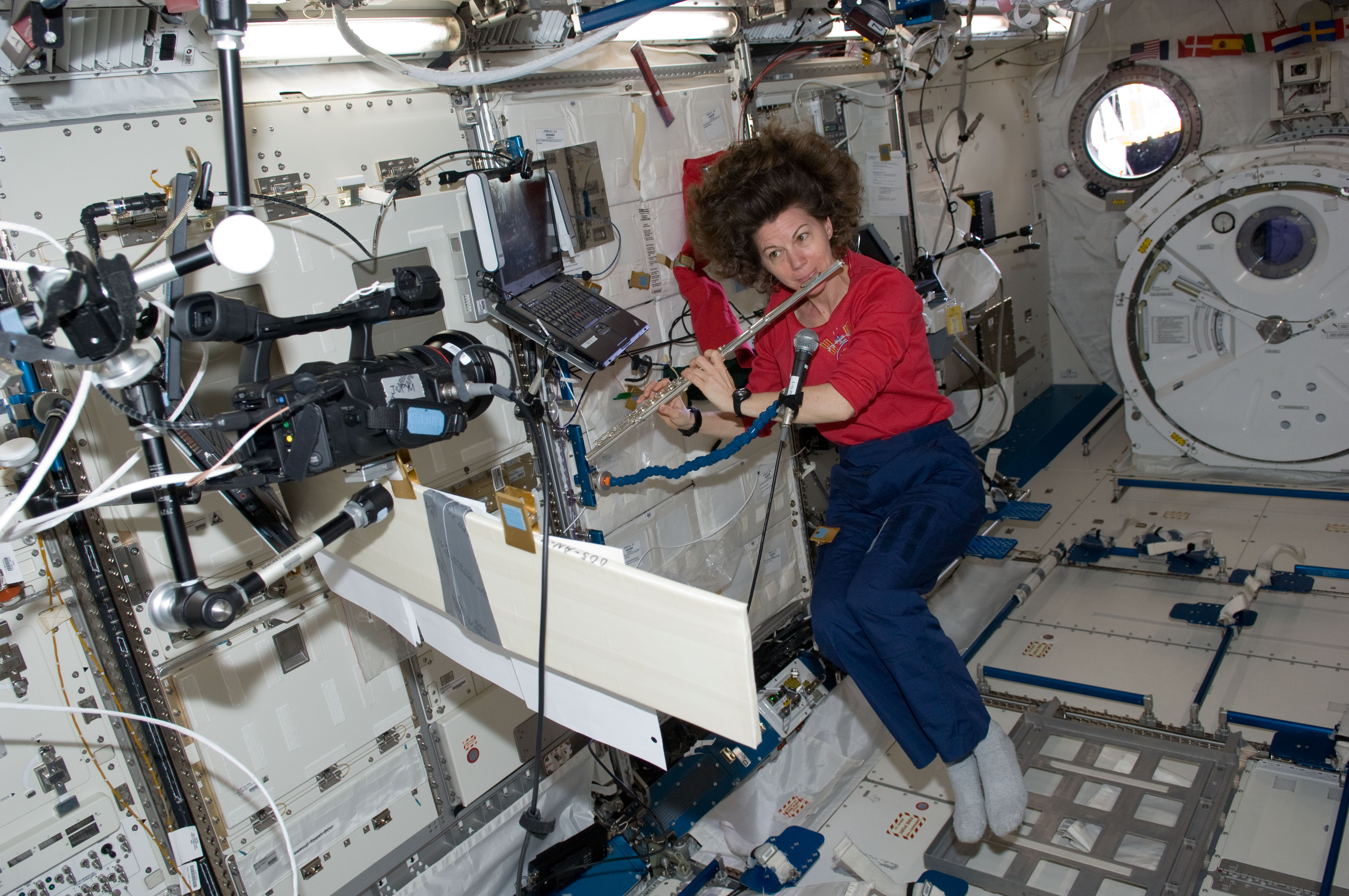
Coleman playing a flute inside the International Space Station in 2011

STS-73 on Space Shuttle Columbia (October 20 to November 5, 1995) was the second United States Microgravity Laboratory (USML-2) mission. The mission focused on materials science, biotechnology, combustion science, the physics of fluids, and numerous scientific experiments housed in the pressurized Spacelab module. In completing her first space flight, Coleman orbited the Earth 256 times, traveled over 6 million miles, and logged a total of 15 days, 21 hours, 52 minutes and 21 seconds in space.

STS-93 on Columbia (July 22 to 27, 1999) was a five-day mission during which Coleman was the lead mission specialist for the deployment of the Chandra X-ray Observatory. Designed to conduct comprehensive studies of the universe, the telescope will enable scientists to study exotic phenomena such as exploding stars, quasars, and black holes. Mission duration was 118 hours and 50 minutes.

Soyuz TMA-20 / Expedition 26/27 (December 15, 2010, to May 23, 2011) was an extended duration mission to the International Space Station.

== Personal ==
Coleman is married to glass artist Josh Simpson who lives in Massachusetts. They have two sons Jamey (born 2002) and Cady. She is part of the band Bandella, which also includes fellow NASA astronaut Stephen Robinson, Canadian astronaut Chris Hadfield, and Micki Pettit (wife of the astronaut Donald Pettit). Coleman is a flute player and has taken several flutes with her to the ISS, including a pennywhistle from Paddy Moloney of The Chieftains, an old Irish flute from Matt Molloy of The Chieftains, and a flute from Ian Anderson of Jethro Tull. On February 15, 2011, she played one of the instruments live from orbit on National Public Radio.

On April 12, 2011, she played a duet with Ian Anderson to honour Yuri Gagarin's 50th anniversary of his flight. She first recorded her part, which later on Anderson joined while on tour in Perm.

On May 13 of that year, Coleman delivered a taped commencement address to the class of 2011 at the University of Massachusetts Amherst.

As do many other astronauts, Coleman holds an amateur radio license (callsign: KC5ZTH).

As of 2015, she is also known to be working as a guest speaker at the Baylor College of Medicine, for the children's program "Saturday Morning Science".

In 2018, she gave a graduation address to Carter Lynch, the sole graduate of Cuttyhunk Elementary School, on Cuttyhunk Island, Massachusetts.

In 2019 the Irish postal service An Post issued a set of commemorative stamps for the 50th anniversary of the Apollo Moon landings, Catherine Coleman is featured alongside fellow astronauts Neil Armstrong, Michael Collins, and Eileen Collins.
