= Thomas J. McCarthy =

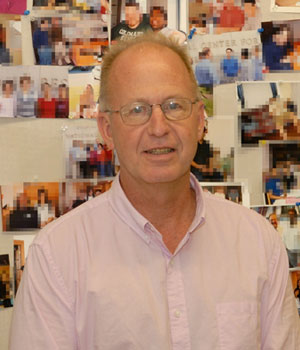
- Born: February 20, 1956 (age 70); Pittsfield, Massachusetts, United States
- Education: University of Massachusetts Amherst, Massachusetts Institute of Technology
- Scientific career
- Fields: Chemistry, Polymer Science, Surface Science
- Workplaces: University of Massachusetts Amherst
- Doctoral advisor: George M. Whitesides
- Notable students: Cady Coleman
- Website: McCarthy Research Group

Thomas J. McCarthy (born February 20, 1956) is an American born researcher, Professor of Polymer Science and Engineering at the University of Massachusetts Amherst.

== Biography ==
Thomas 'Tom' McCarthy was born in Pittsfield, Massachusetts on February 20, 1956. His father, James (Jim), was a draftsman and later a manager at the General Electric Company. His mother, Helen, was a nurse and later a high school English teacher. Tom was educated in the Pittsfield public school system and graduated from Pittsfield High School and Pittsfield Community Music School in 1974. He studied chemistry at the University of Massachusetts, Amherst (UMass Amherst), earning his B.S. in 1978, and organic chemistry at the Massachusetts Institute of Technology, earning his Ph.D. in 1982. His undergraduate and graduate advisors were C. Peter Lillya and George M. Whitesides. He has been a faculty member in the polymer science and engineering department at UMass Amherst since 1982 and was promoted to associate professor in 1986 and professor in 1991. He served as department head from 2000-2003. Since 2006 he has been a guest professor at Changchun Institute of Applied Chemistry and has taught there each semester since 2005.

== Publications ==
He has published 152 peer-reviewed papers, and has been awarded 10 U.S. patents. His earliest papers were on organic chemistry; subsequently, they were mostly on polymer and surface chemistry. His most cited paper, written jointly with Didem Öner, is "Ultrahydrophobic Surfaces. Effects of Topography Length Scales on Wettability" (Langmuir, 2000, 16 (20), pp 7777–7782, DOI: 10.1021/la000598o which has received 1224 citations according to Google Scholar In all, 59 of his papers have had 60 or more citations.

== Notable students ==
- Catherine Coleman
- Anthony J. Dias
- Molly Shoichet
