= Røyken Upper Secondary School =

Location
- Røyken, Akershus; Norway
- Coordinates: 59°44′17″N 10°23′58″E

Information
- Motto: Fokus på Framtiden (Focus on the future)
- Established: 1978
- Headmaster: Laila J.Handelsby
- Employees: 127
- Website: royken.vgs.no

Røyken Upper Secondary School (Norwegian: Røyken videregående skole) is an upper secondary school situated in Asker, Akershus, Norway.

The school was established in 1978, and the first Headmaster was Olav J. Aadnekvam. The present Headmaster is Ole K. Sageng, and the present Deputy Headmaster is Ellen Watkinson. About 800 pupils attend the school, which offers 7 different programs in the Norwegian upper secondary school system. Røyken videregående skole is an UNESCO-Associated Schools Project school, and offers several international exchange programs. Catherine Coleman (who became a NASA astronaut)(USA) and Una Tomasevic (Yugoslavia) were exchange students to Røyken videregående skole during the 1978–79 school year.

About 800 pupils attend the school in 38 classes. The school offers a wide range of teaching programs in both vocational subjects and study preparatory education programs. Røyken Upper Secondary School cooperates with many companies in the placement of professional students in practice, and has a good cooperation with various institutions that contribute to the teaching. The school also has close contact with schools abroad and has regular student exchange projects every year.

== History ==
Røyken Videregående Skole was formally established on March 1, 1978. The first part of the building was taken into use in the fall of 1978. The remaining part of the school was taken into use from New Year 1979. The school was then the first so-called combined school in Buskerud.

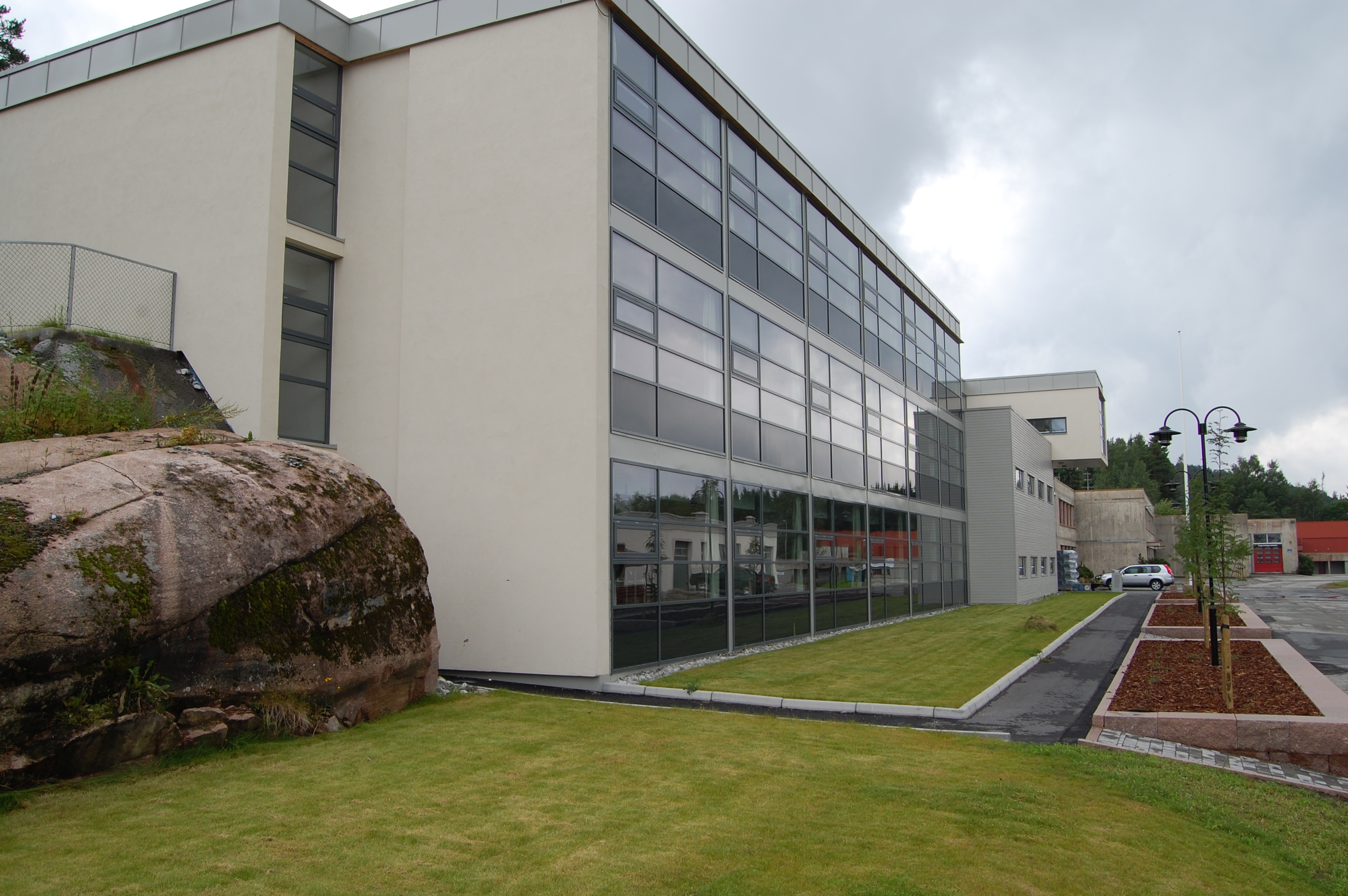
Røyken Videregående Skole from the main entrance

=== Major restructuring of upper secondary education in the 1970s ===
Prior to 1976, everyone who was going to take higher education had to travel out of Røyken, either to Drammen, Lier or to Asker. The students could attend high school, vocational school or home school. When the "Higher Education Act" came in 1976, all these school classes were brought together under the same name. This led to many schools being built for both vocational and general subjects. The smoke in secondary school is such a combined school, which from the beginning had buildings and carpentry, mechanical, electrical, electrical, drawing form and color, household and general subjects.

From the fall of 1976, students could attend high school in Røyken. Then a branch school was established under St. Hallvard gymnasium in Drammen, and that branch was in Klokkergården at Røyken Church. From New Year 1979, the three high school classes moved in and became part of the new school.

=== Røyken Videregående Skole was a pioneering school ===
The new law on higher education from 1976, with the merging of different school types with their many cultures, posed a number of challenges with which much was being worked. From a central point of view, a great focus was also placed on the combined schools. For example, NRK created a television program about the new type of schools based on our school. During the first few years the school also had large environmental projects where the students engaged in alternative activities over several days across the fields of study. This was an important contribution to understanding and respect for the cultures of the different fields of study and clearly marked the school environment.

=== Population growth and space requirements ===
The school was originally built for 450 students, but quickly became too small. When the need for more space was pushed, this was solved by the establishment of a branch office in the bank building in Sætre. Here, the field of study, which was then called Commerce and Office, moved. Later, a branch department for chemistry and process was established at Tofte and a branch for carpenters at Filtvet: both with one class each. The reason for these branches was probably the desire to create a new high school in Hurum. These branches did not temporarily solve the school's area requirements in relation to the large student growth that came in the late 1980s. In the autumn of 1989/1990 a large pavilion with six classrooms was set up.

It gradually became clear that branches with small environments did not provide the good school and learning environments that were desirable. The search declined and the students' complaints meant that in the autumn of 1994 another pavilion was installed at the school and the last branch was closed.

The increase in the number of classes also led to the need for more and better workplaces for employees. Based on this, in 1996/97 it was built on a floor on the A-wing. This extension also provided a few extra classrooms. After much work, a new wing was built in 2007/08 to replace the oldest pavilion.

In recent years, the school has also undergone extensive renovation of the oldest part of the buildings from 1979, so the school now looks both pretty and modern.

=== Two major reforms of higher education ===
During all these years, the school has been through two major reforms. “Reform 94” gathered over a hundred first-class vocational subjects in quite a few basic courses and fields of study. At the same time, all students were given the right to enter upper secondary education, and for the first time, all pupils were also entitled to enter upper secondary education.

Prior to this reform, for example, construction professionals could get their practical training by building detached houses and other larger buildings in the immediate area. Their biggest project was the branch house at Sydskogen. Because the new curriculum placed more emphasis on theory and a wide breadth of fields of study, there was no room for such large projects.

The second major reform, the "Knowledge Promotion", came in 2006, and emphasized theoretical knowledge even more. “Competence” and “competence goals” have become important concepts. “General subjects” became “study specializing” and “study subjects” went on to be called “program subjects”.

=== From pencil, chalk and tablet to computers for everyone ===
Computer technology has kept its entrance into the Norwegian school during these years. The first computers came to us in the mid 80's. They came to Trade and Office and to someone in the school management. Røyken Videregående school has always been at the forefront of development, and the school were among the first schools where all students got their own PC.

=== Røyken Videregående Skole is a school in Europe ===
Our school places great emphasis on internationalization, and from the beginning of the 1990s the school have had an exchange with Tournai in Belgium. For many years the school have also had exchanges with Stamford in England, Thuringia in Germany and with schools near Belgrade in Serbia. Pupils on the carpentry line have worked on buildings by the Norwegian shoe on the Costa Blanca in Spain.
