= Expedition 26 =

Mission to the International Space Station

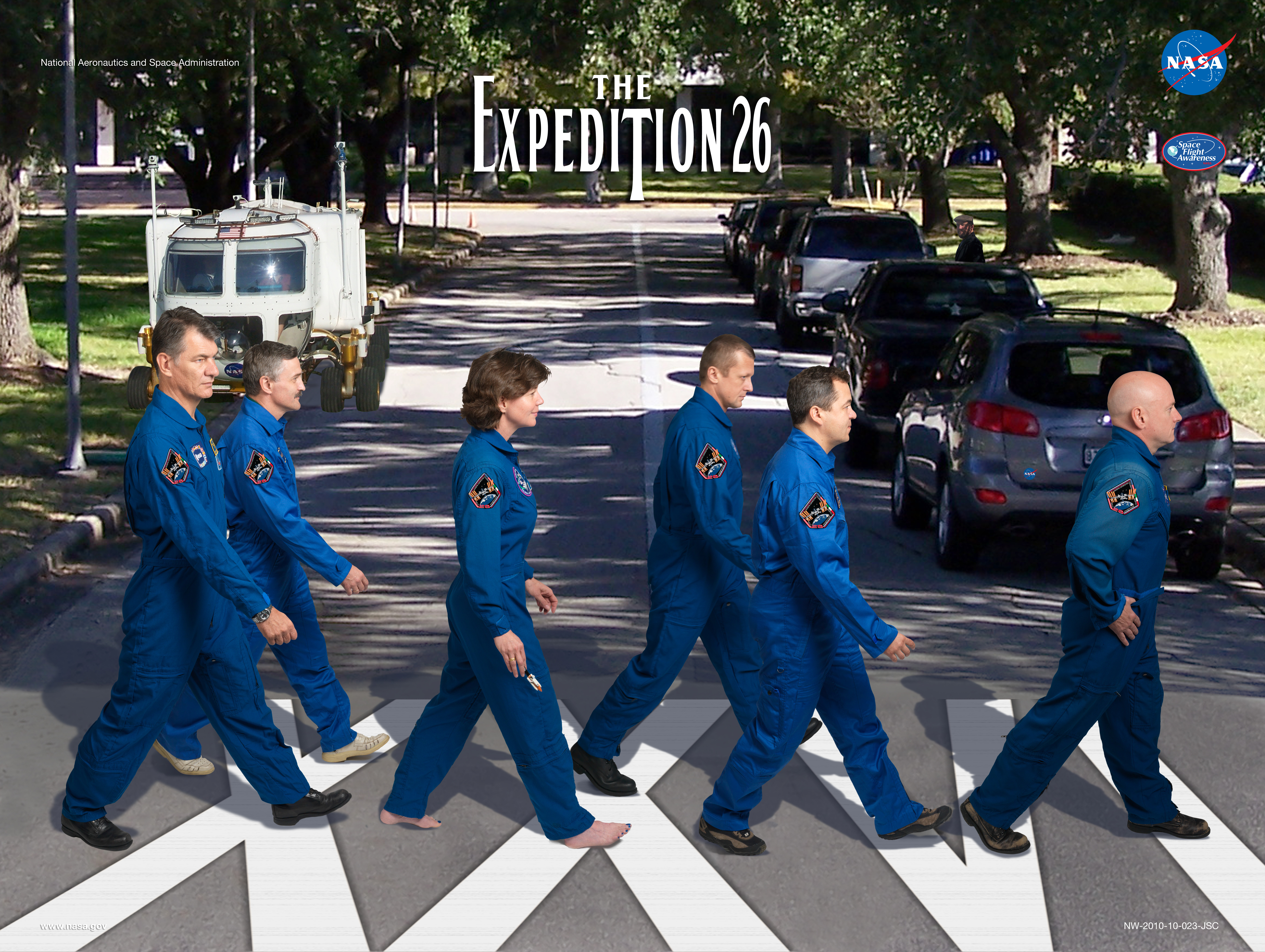
- Promotional Poster
- Mission type: Long-duration expedition

Expedition
- Space station: International Space Station
- Began: 26 November 2010, 04:46 UTC
- Ended: 16 March 2011, 08:54 UTC
- Arrived aboard: Soyuz TMA-01M; Soyuz TMA-20
- Departed aboard: Soyuz TMA-01M; Soyuz TMA-20

Crew
- Crew size: 6
- Members: Expedition 25/26: Scott J. Kelly; Aleksandr Kaleri; Oleg Skripochka Expedition 26/27: Dmitri Kondratyev; Catherine Coleman; Paolo Nespoli
- EVAs: 2
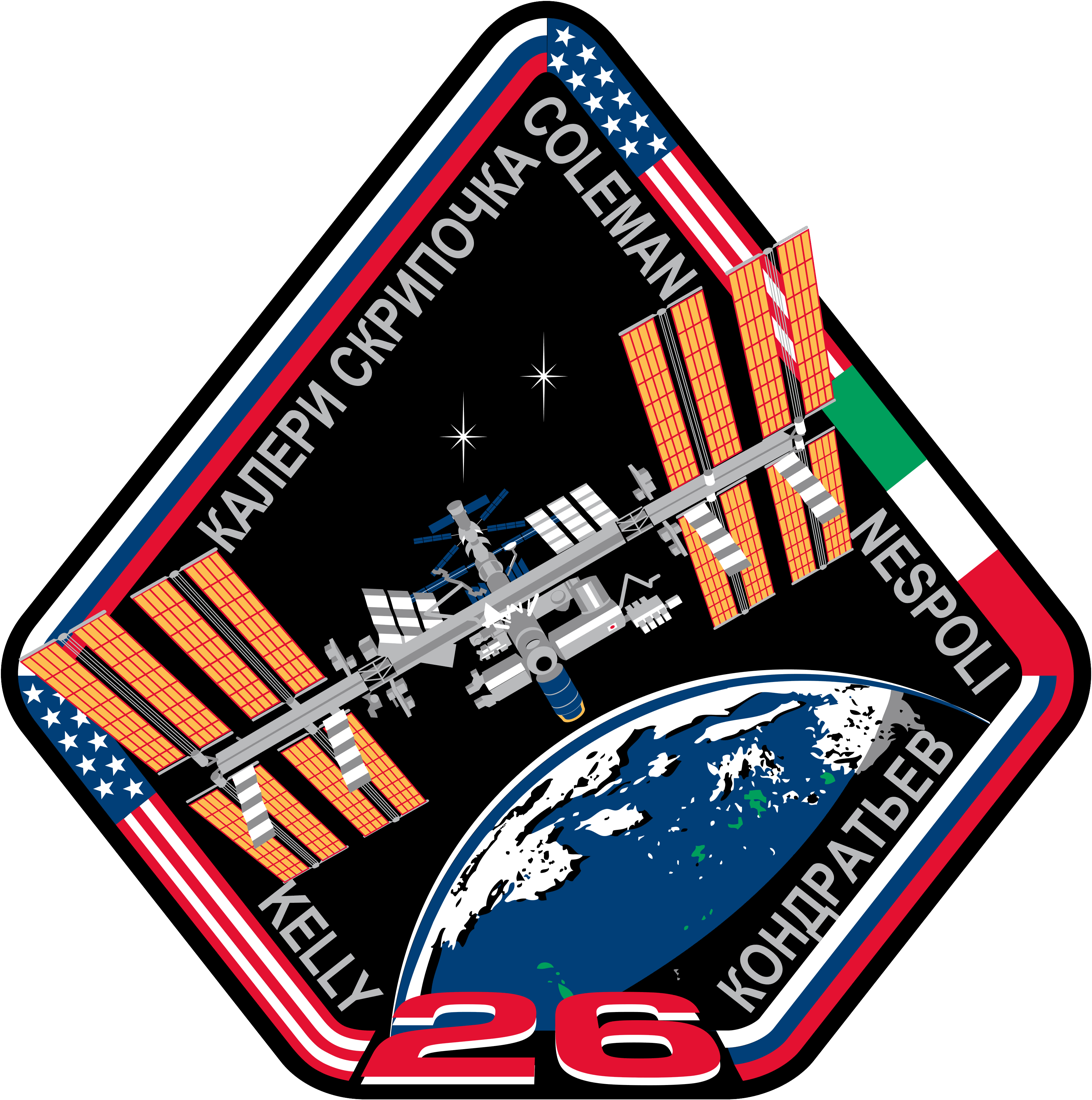
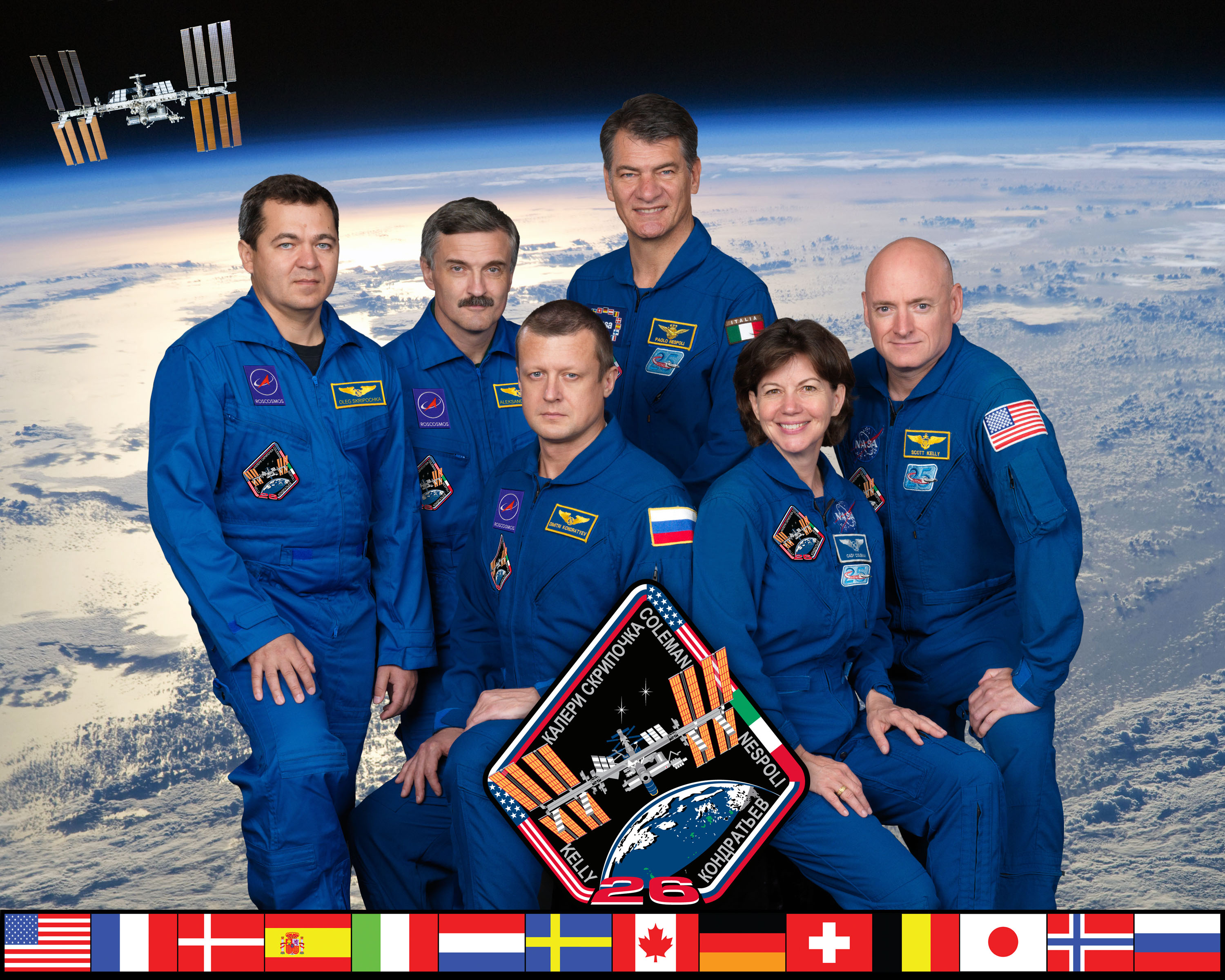
- Expedition 26 mission patch (l-r) Skripochka, Kaleri, Kondratyev, Nespoli, Coleman and Kelly ISS expeditions

Expedition 26 was the 26th long-duration mission to the International Space Station. The expedition's first three crew members – one US astronaut and two Russian cosmonauts – arrived at the station on board Soyuz TMA-01M on 10 October 2010. Expedition 26 officially began the following month on 26 November, when half of the crew of the previous mission, Expedition 25, returned to Earth on board Soyuz TMA-19. The rest of the Expedition 26 crew – one US astronaut, one Russian cosmonaut and one ESA astronaut – joined the trio already on board when their spacecraft, Soyuz TMA-20, docked with the station on 17 December 2010.

The commander of Expedition 25, Douglas Wheelock, handed over command of the station to Expedition 26 commander Scott Kelly on 24 November 2010. The 26 crew was joined by the crew of STS-133 on 26 February 2011, and was supplied by the ESA's Johannes Kepler unmanned resupply craft, which arrived on 24 February. Expedition 26 ended on 16 March 2011 with the departure of Soyuz TMA-01M.

== Crew ==
Position	First part (November 2010)	Second part (December 2010 to March 2011)
Commander	Scott J. Kelly, NASA; Third spaceflight	
Flight Engineer 1	Aleksandr Kaleri, RSA; Fifth and last spaceflight	
Flight Engineer 2	Oleg Skripochka, RSA; First spaceflight	
Flight Engineer 3		Dmitri Kondratyev, RSA; Only spaceflight
Flight Engineer 4		Catherine Coleman, NASA; Third and last spaceflight
Flight Engineer 5		Paolo Nespoli, ESA; Second spaceflight

Source
NASA

=== Backup crew ===
- Ronald Garan, for Kelly
- Sergey Volkov, for Kaleri
- Oleg Kononenko, for Skripochka
- Anatoli Ivanishin, for Kondratyev
- Michael Fossum, for Coleman
- (Japan) Satoshi Furukawa, for Nespoli

=== MagISStra ===
ESA astronaut Paolo Nespoli's mission to the space station was named MagISStra. The name combines the word magistra, meaning "female teacher" in Latin, with the acronym "ISS", as suggested by Antonella Pezzani of Italy.

== Spacewalks ==
Two Russian spacewalks were scheduled for Expedition 26. The first, Russian EVA-27, was conducted Friday, 21 January 2011. The second spacewalk, Russian EVA-28, was conducted on the date of 16 February 2011. Cosmonauts Oleg Skripochka and Dmitri Kondratyev conducted both spacewalks.

== Gallery ==
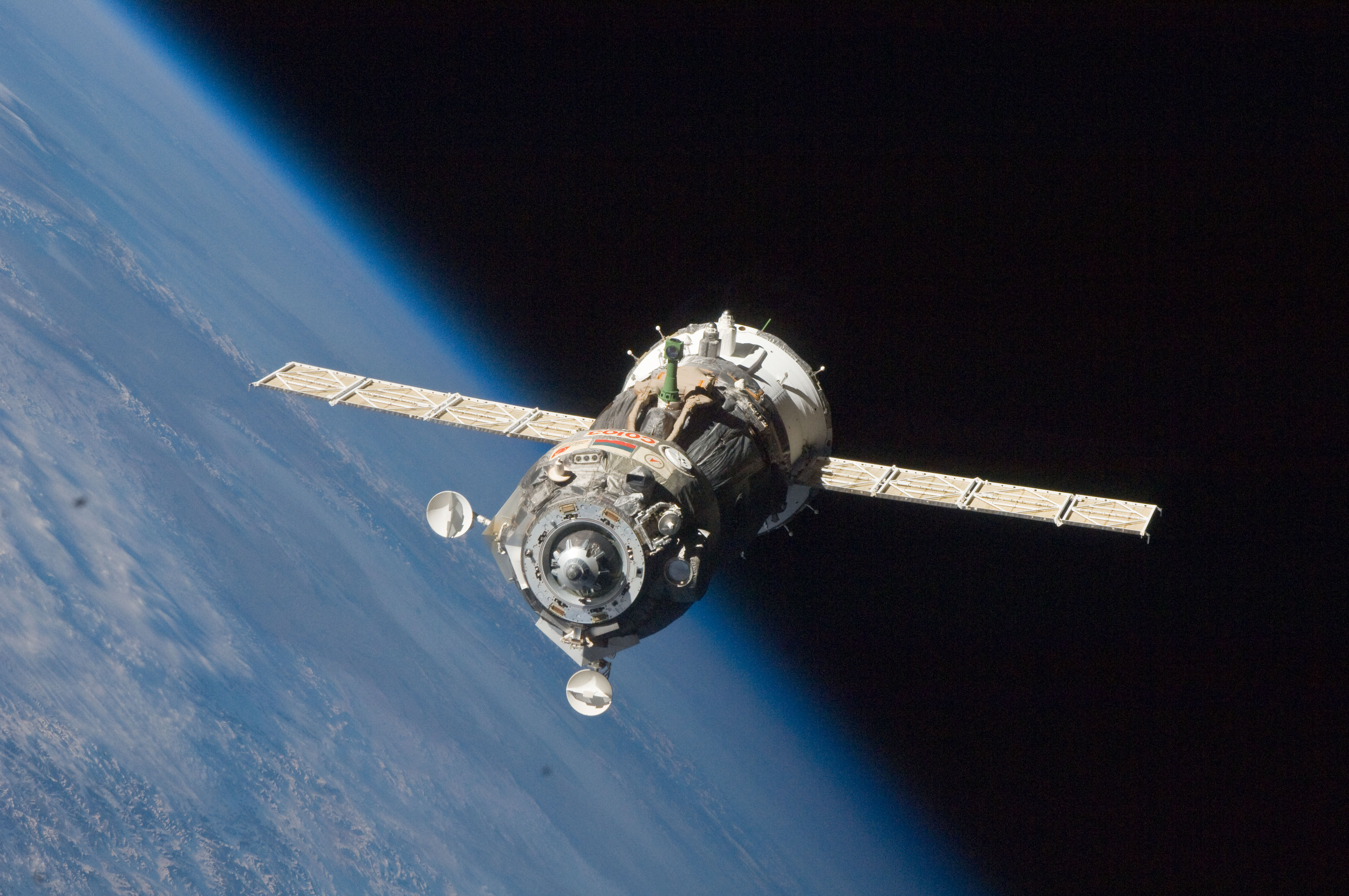
Soyuz TMA-19 departs the ISS, marking the beginning of Expedition 26.

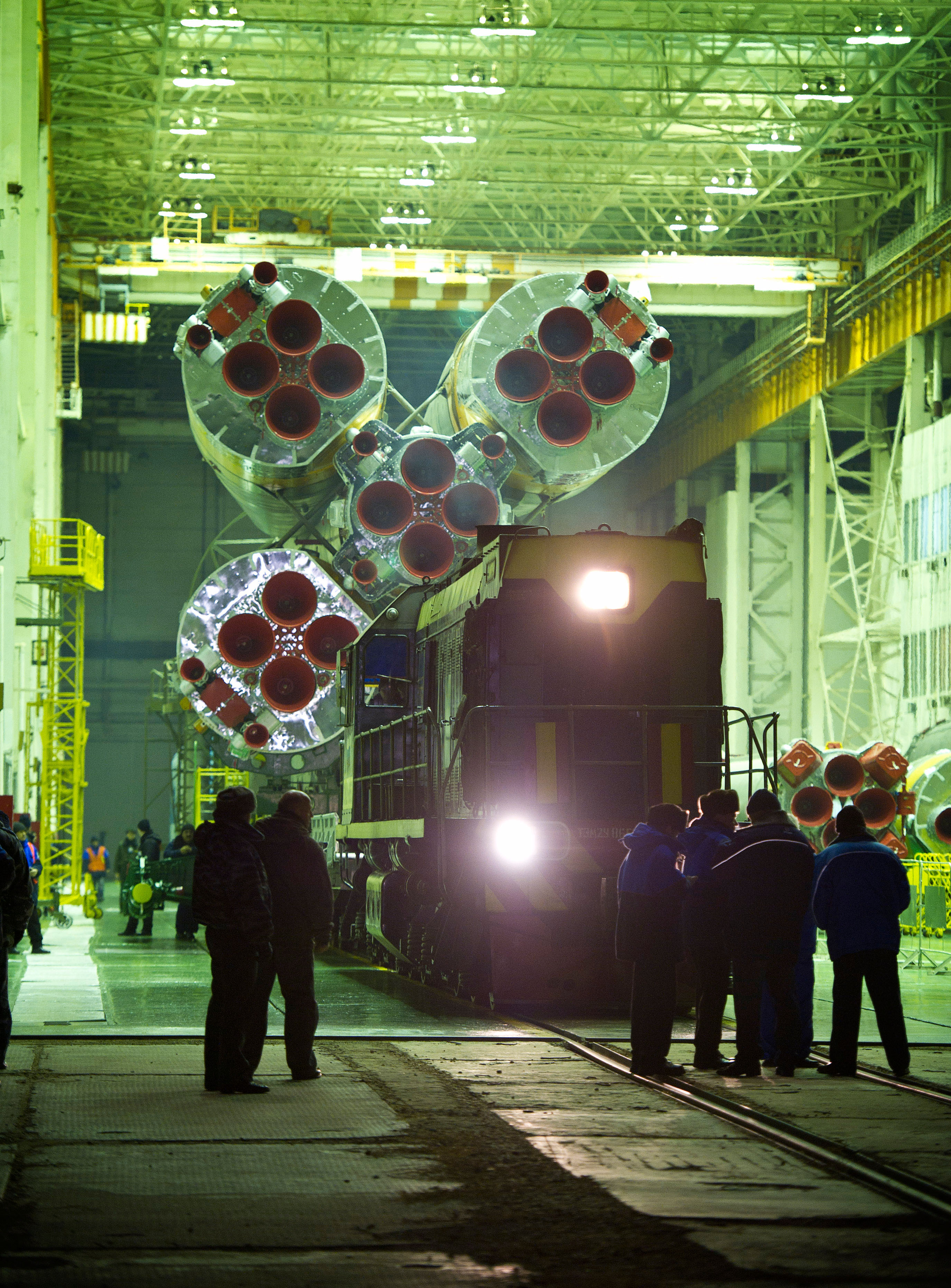
The Soyuz TMA-20 spacecraft is rolled out by train on its way to the launch pad at the Baikonur Cosmodrome in Kazakhstan.

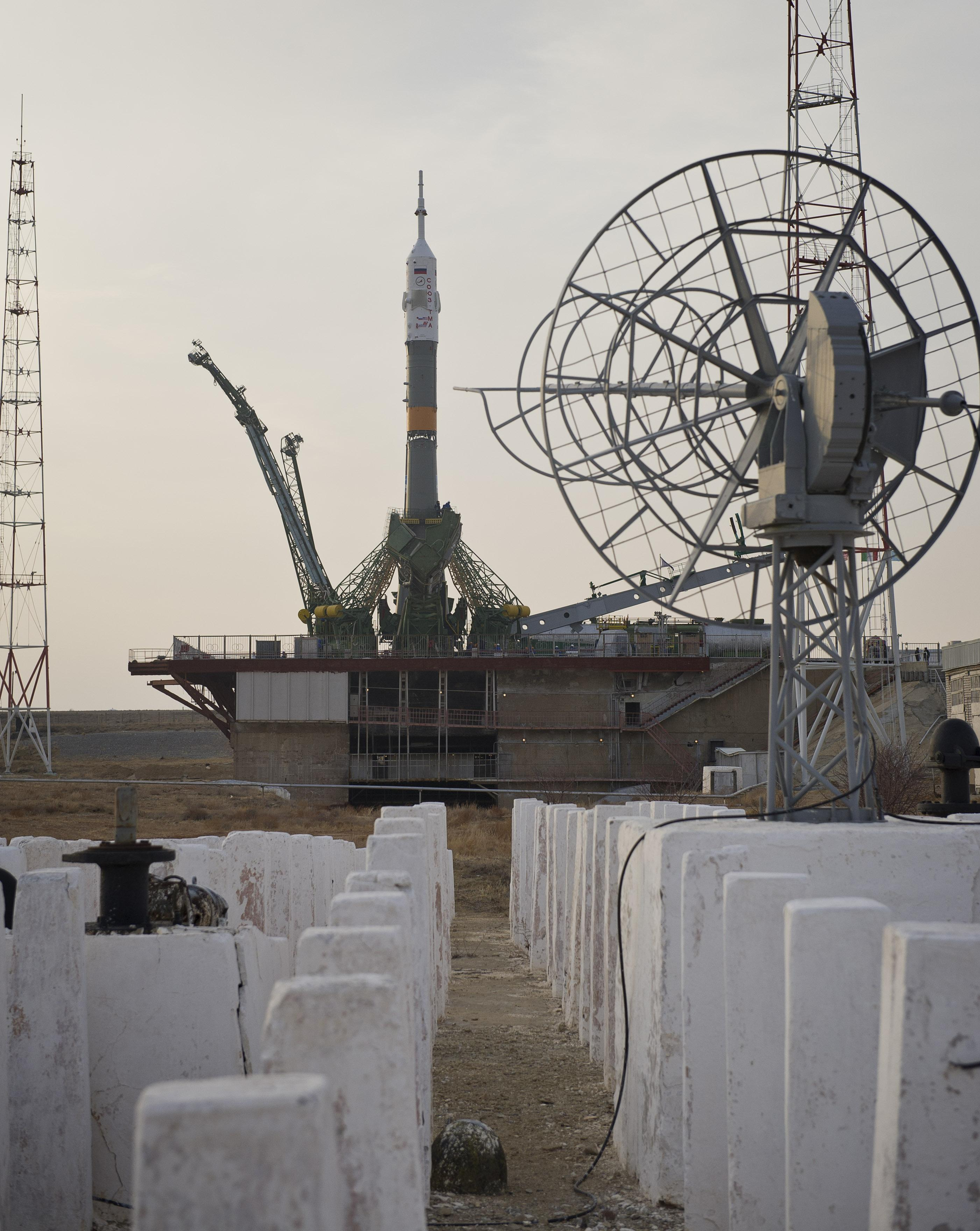
The Soyuz TMA-20 spacecraft is seen shortly after arrival to the launch pad.

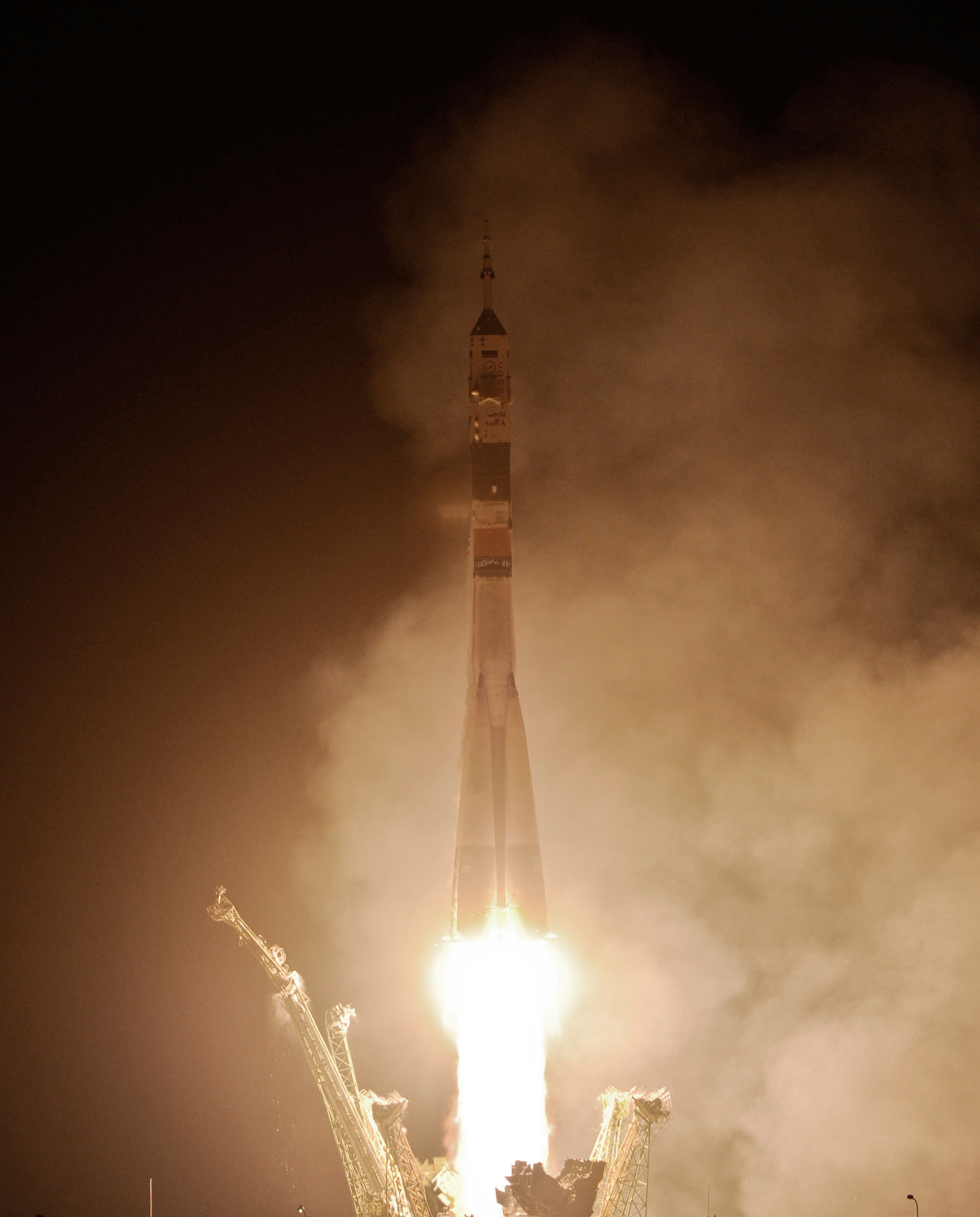
Soyuz TMA-20 lifts-off on 15 December 2010.

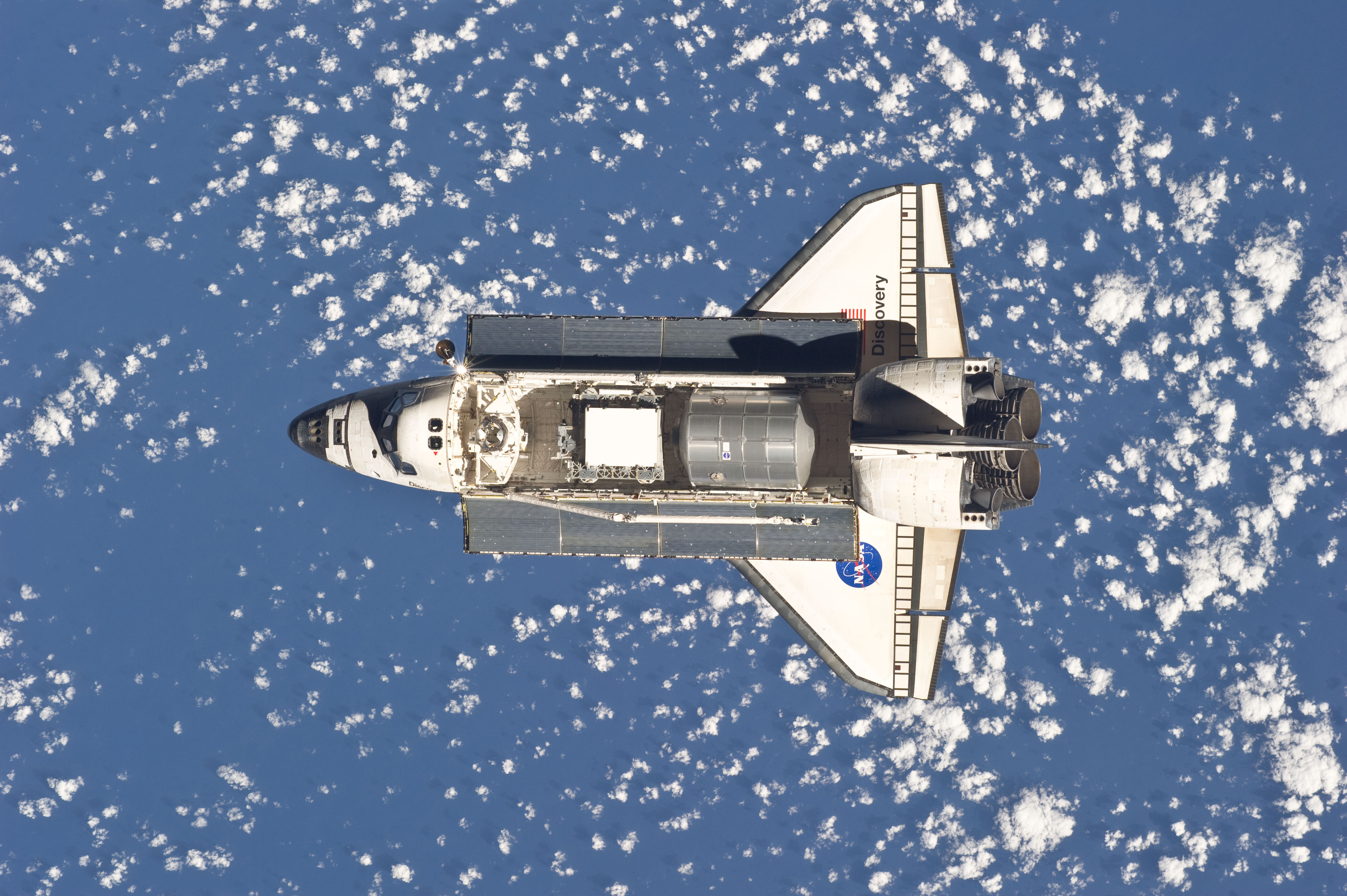
Space Shuttle Discovery approaches the ISS on 26 February 2011.

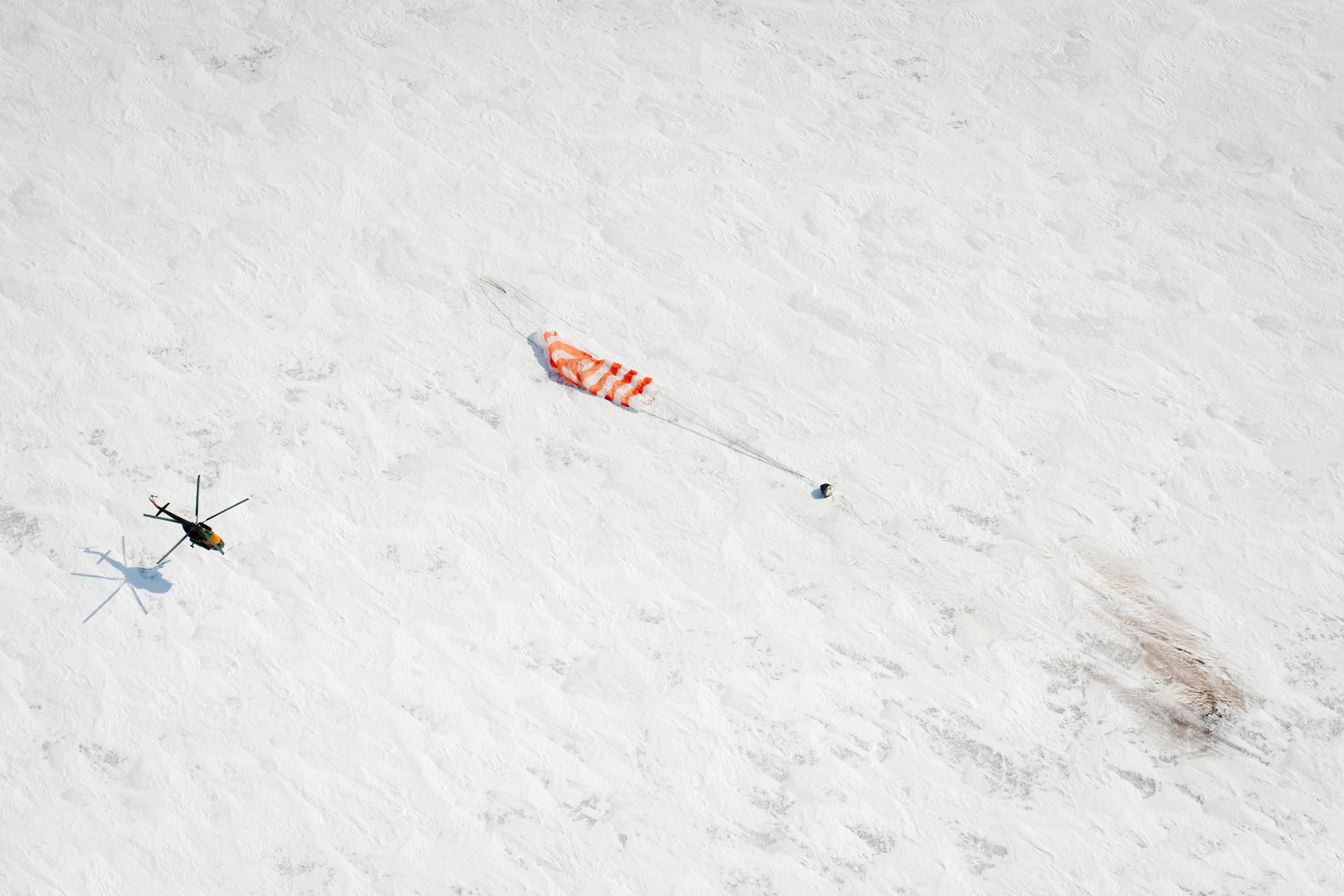
Soyuz TMA-01M after landing in Kazakhstan on 16 March 2011
