= Dmitri Kondratyev =

Russian cosmonaut (born 1969)

- Дмитрий Кондратьев
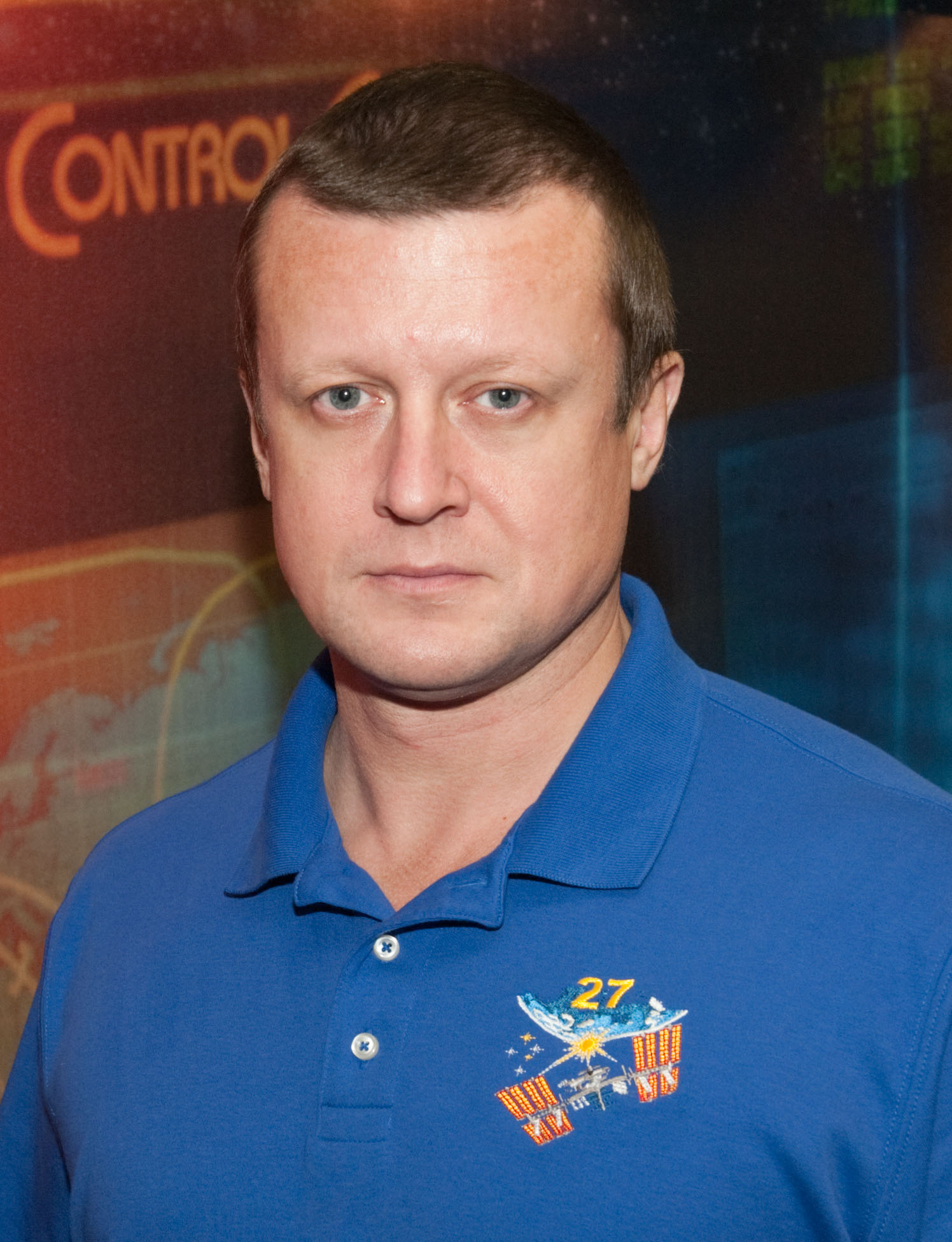
- Born: 25 May 1969 (age 57); Irkutsk, Russian SFSR, Soviet Union
- Occupations: Colonel, Russian Air Force
- Space career

Roscosmos cosmonaut
- Status: Retired
- Time in space: 159d 7h 17m
- Selection: 1997 Cosmonaut Group
- Total EVAs: 2
- Total EVA time: 10 hours, 13 minutes
- Missions: Soyuz TMA-20 (Expedition 26/27)
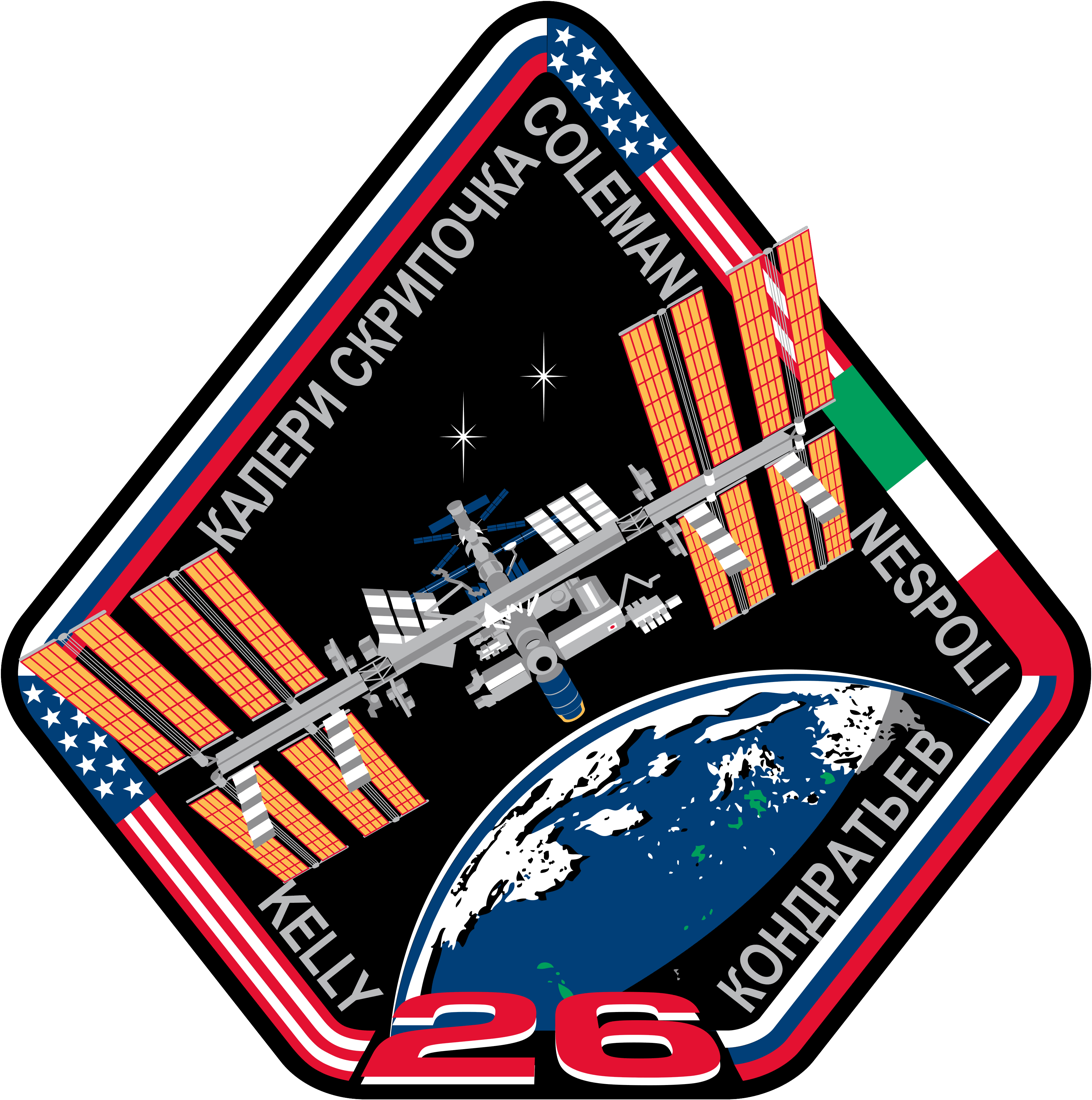
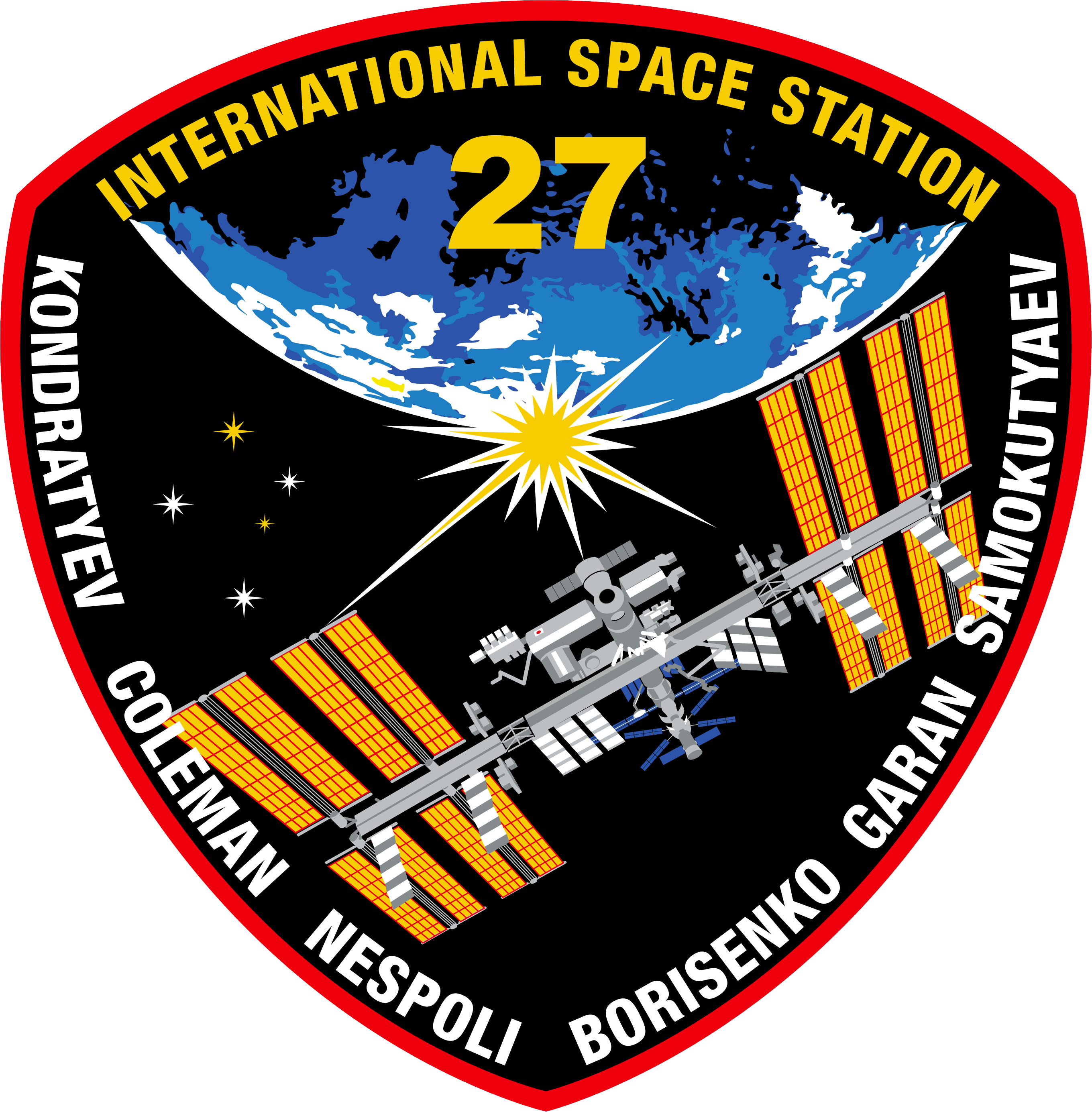
- Mission insignia
- Retired: July 25, 2012

Dmitri Yuryevich Kondratyev (Russian: Дмитрий Юрьевич Кондратьев, born on 25 May 1969 in Irkutsk, Russia) is a retired Russian cosmonaut. He served as a crew member on the International Space Station long duration mission Expedition 27 as commander, having also served as a flight engineer on Expedition 26 during the same stay in space. Kondratyev traveled to space for the first time aboard the Soyuz TMA-20 spacecraft in December 2010.

== Personal ==
Kondratyev is married to Dinara, and they have a son named Vladislav. His parents, Yuri Semyonovich Kondratyev and Valentina Dmitriyevna Kondratyeva (née Zaozyornova), reside in Alma-Aty, Kazakhstan. His pastimes include computers, karate, economics and fishing.

== Education ==
Kondratyev completed Yak-52 flight training at the Alma-Aty Aviation Club in 1986. In 1990, he entered the Kacha Air Force Pilot School graduating in 1990 as a pilot-engineer. In 2000, Kondratyev graduated from the Moscow State University for Economy, Statistics and Computer Science (MESI), Economic Information Systems Department as an economist. In 2004, he graduated from the Yuri A. Gagarin Air Force Academy.

== Experience ==
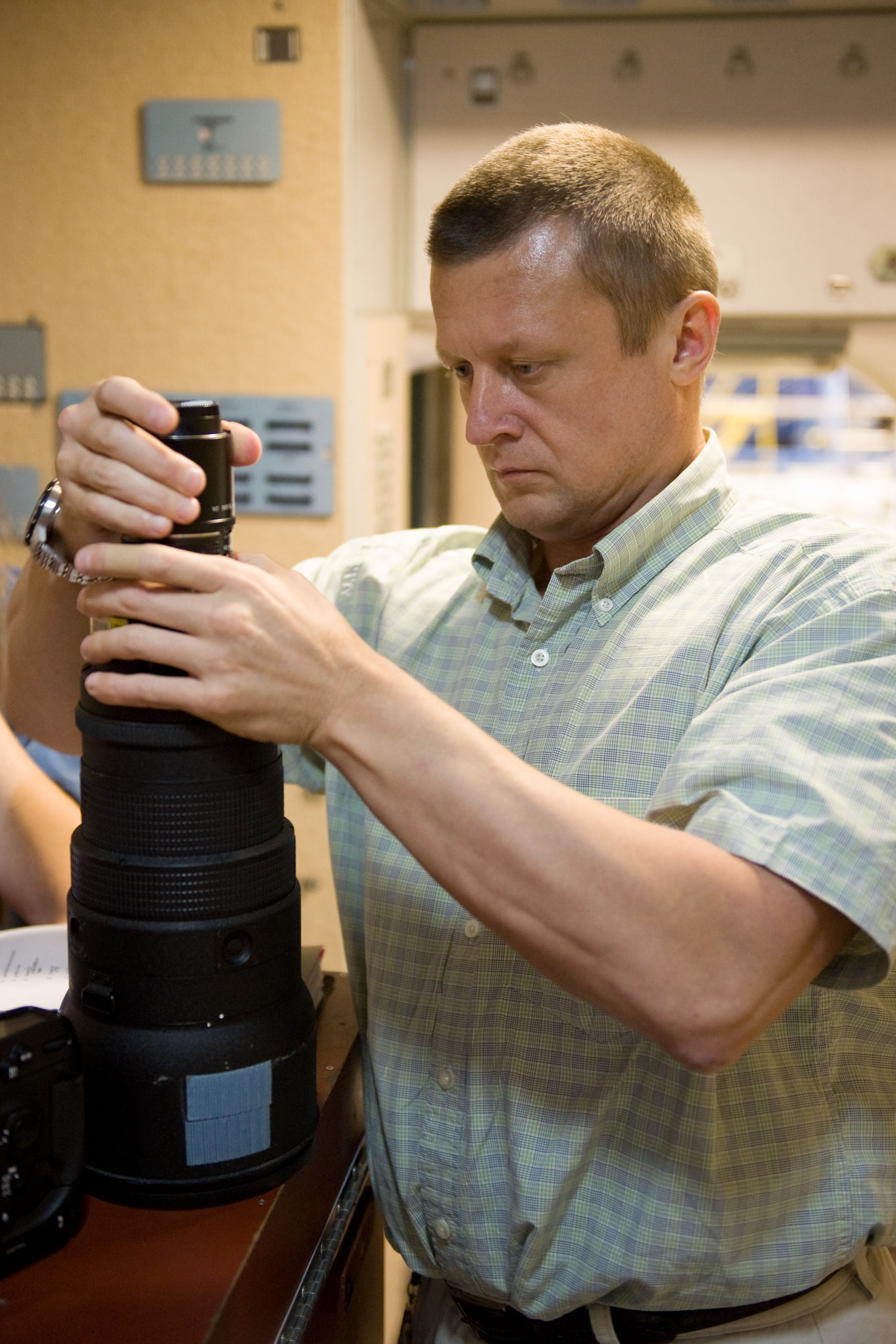
Kondratyev working with camera equipment at NASA's Johnson Space Center.

After graduation from pilot school in 1990, Kondratyev served as a pilot and subsequently as a senior pilot in the Russian Air Force. He flew MiG-21, MiG-29 and Su-27 Russian fighter aircraft. He is a Class 1 Air Force pilot. Kondratyev is also an instructor of General Parachute Training and has performed more than 150 parachute jumps.

== Cosmonaut career ==
Kondratyev was selected as a test-cosmonaut candidate of the Gagarin Cosmonaut Training Center Cosmonaut Office in December 1997. He attended basic space training from January 1998 to March 2000. In 2000 he was qualified as a test-cosmonaut. Kondratyev was assigned to the ISS Expedition 5 Backup crew as Soyuz Commander and ISS Flight Engineer and successfully completed that training in 2003. Kondratyev was then assigned to the ISS Expedition 13 long duration mission prime crew and trained as ISS Flight Engineer and Soyuz Commander for one and a half year until the crew reassignment named ESA astronaut Thomas Reiter. Kondratyev was assigned to the ISS Expedition 20 Backup crew as Soyuz Commander and ISS Flight Engineer and successfully completed that training. From 2 May 2006 through 9 April 2007, he served as Director of Operations, Russian Space Agency, stationed at the Johnson Space Center. In March 2007 Kondratyev received his U.S. Federal Aviation Administration (FAA) Private Pilot License. In March 2009 Kondratyev received his U.S. FAA Airline Transport Pilot Licence.

=== Expedition 26/27 ===
Kondratyev was assigned to the ISS Expedition 26/27 Prime crew as Soyuz Commander and Expedition 27 Commander. He traveled to the space station on 15 December 2010 aboard the Soyuz TMA-20 spacecraft.

=== Spacewalks ===
Kondratyev participated in two spacewalks during his stay aboard the space station as an Expedition 26 and 27 Flight Engineer and Commander.

=== Russian EVA #27 ===
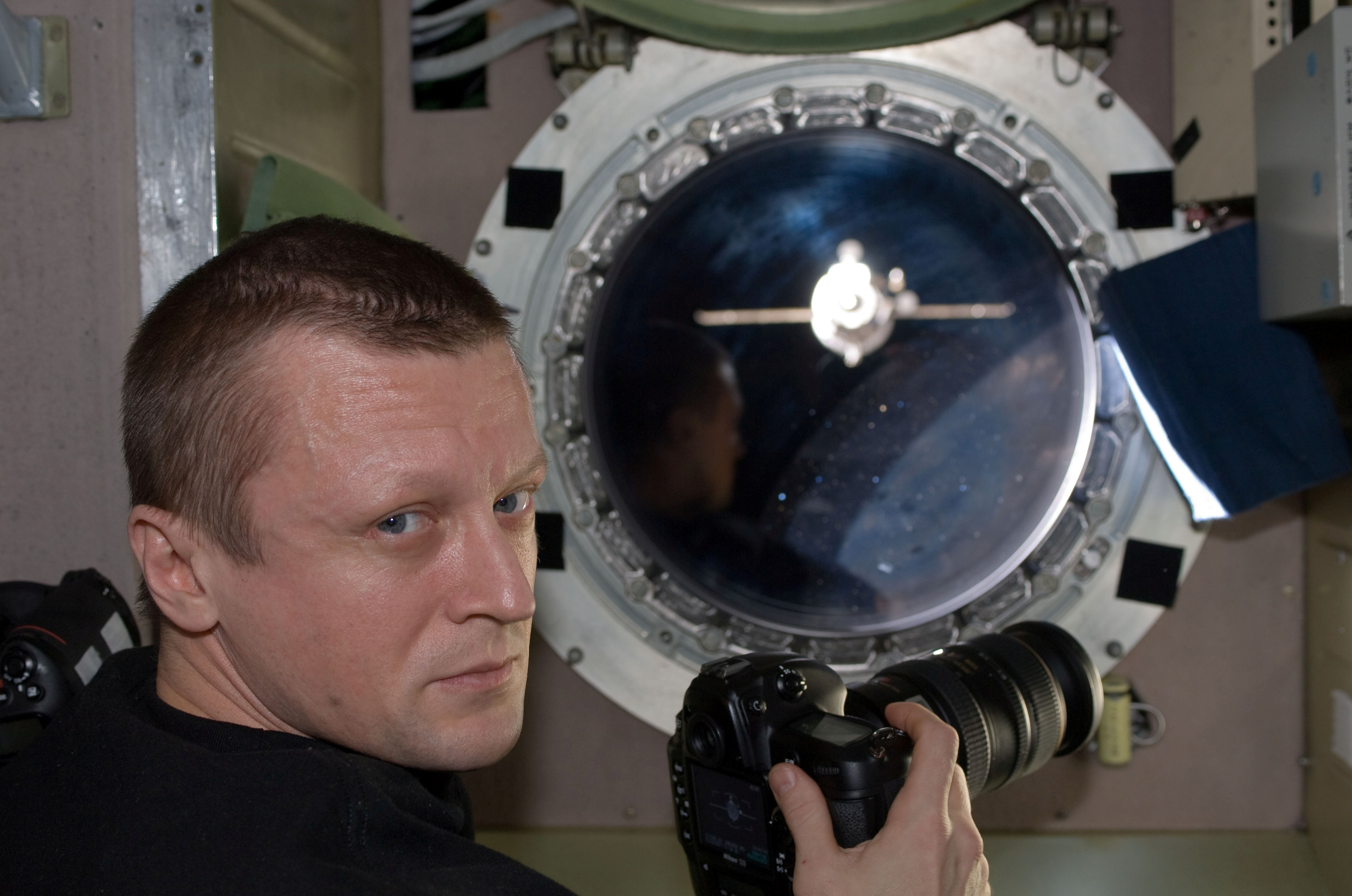
Kondratyev photographing the Progress M-09M departure while inside the Zvezda Service Module.

During the first spacewalk (Russian EVA #27) conducted on 21 January 2011 Kondratyev and cosmonaut Oleg Skripochka focused to complete installation of a new high-speed data transmission system. Kondratyev was designated as Extravehicular 1, and had a red stripe on his spacesuit. Kondratyev and Skripochka began the five-hour, 23-minute spacewalk at 9:29 a.m. EST when the two cosmonauts opened the Pirs hatch and began exiting the Russian segment of the space station. The spacewalk ended at 2:52 p.m EST. They deployed the antenna for the Radio Technical System for Information Transfer, an experimental system designed to enable large data files to be downlinked using radio technology at a speed of about 100 MB/s from space station's Russian segment.

During the spacewalk, Kondratyev and Skripochka also removed the plasma pulse generator on the port side of the Zvezda module that was part of an experiment to investigate disturbances and changes in the ionosphere from space station impulse plasma flow. The generator, was covered, removed and returned inside the Pirs airlock. They also removed the commercial Expose-R experiment from the port side of Zvezda. The joint Russian and European Space Agency package contains a number of material samples that were left open to space conditions. Working inside the Pirs airlock, Kondratyev and Skripochka grabbed the new docking camera for the Rassvet module (MRM1) and carried it to the worksite on Rassvet. They installed the camera and mated the camera's cable to a pre-wired connector that will route the video into the space station.

=== Russian EVA #28 ===
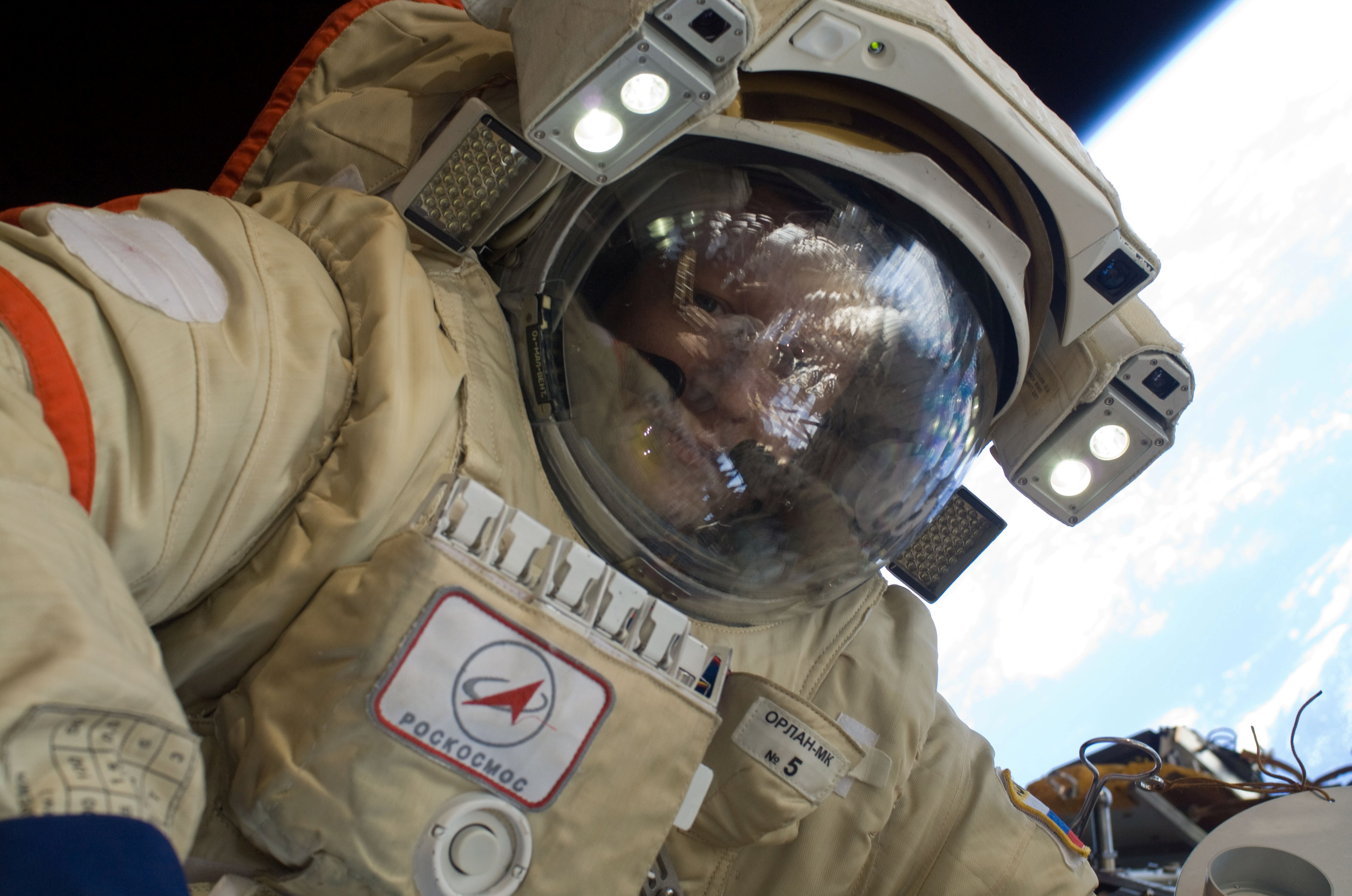
Kondratyev during Russian EVA #28.

On 16 February 2011, Kondratyev and cosmonaut Skripochka participated in a spacewalk (Russian EVA #28) outside the space station. The planned tasks for Kondratyev and Skripochka included to install a radio antenna, deploy a nano satellite, install two experiments and retrieve two exposure panels on a third experiment. The experiments they installed are the Molniya-Gamma experiment, which measures gamma splashes and optical radiation during terrestrial lightning and thunder conditions, and a high-speed data transmission system experiment that uses radio technology. The exposure panels they retrieved are part of the Komplast experiment.

| Preceded by Scott Kelly | ISS Expedition Commander; 16 March to 23 May 2011 | Succeeded by Andrei Borisenko |
