= Anthony J. Dias =

American materials scientist

Anthony J. Dias is a retired ExxonMobil materials scientist known for scientific contributions in polyolefins and elastomers which led to commercialized products.

== Education ==
Dias earned a B.S. in chemistry from Kean College in 1982. He earned a Ph.D. in Polymer Science and Engineering from the University of Massachusetts Amherst in 1987 under Prof. Thomas J. McCarthy.

== Career ==
Dias joined ExxonMobil Chemical Company in 1988 and has held both research and management responsibilities. His most cited scientific work concerned the development of metallocene catalysts on a nonreacting polystrene support to replace reactive silica supports. Dias retired in June 2021 as Chief Scientist.

== Awards and recognition ==
- 1998 - Sparks–Thomas award from the ACS Rubber Division
- 2015 - Fellow of the American Chemical Society
- 2018 - Division Fellow, Polymeric Materials: Science and Engineering
