= Progress M-07M =

Spacecraft for resupplying the International Space Station

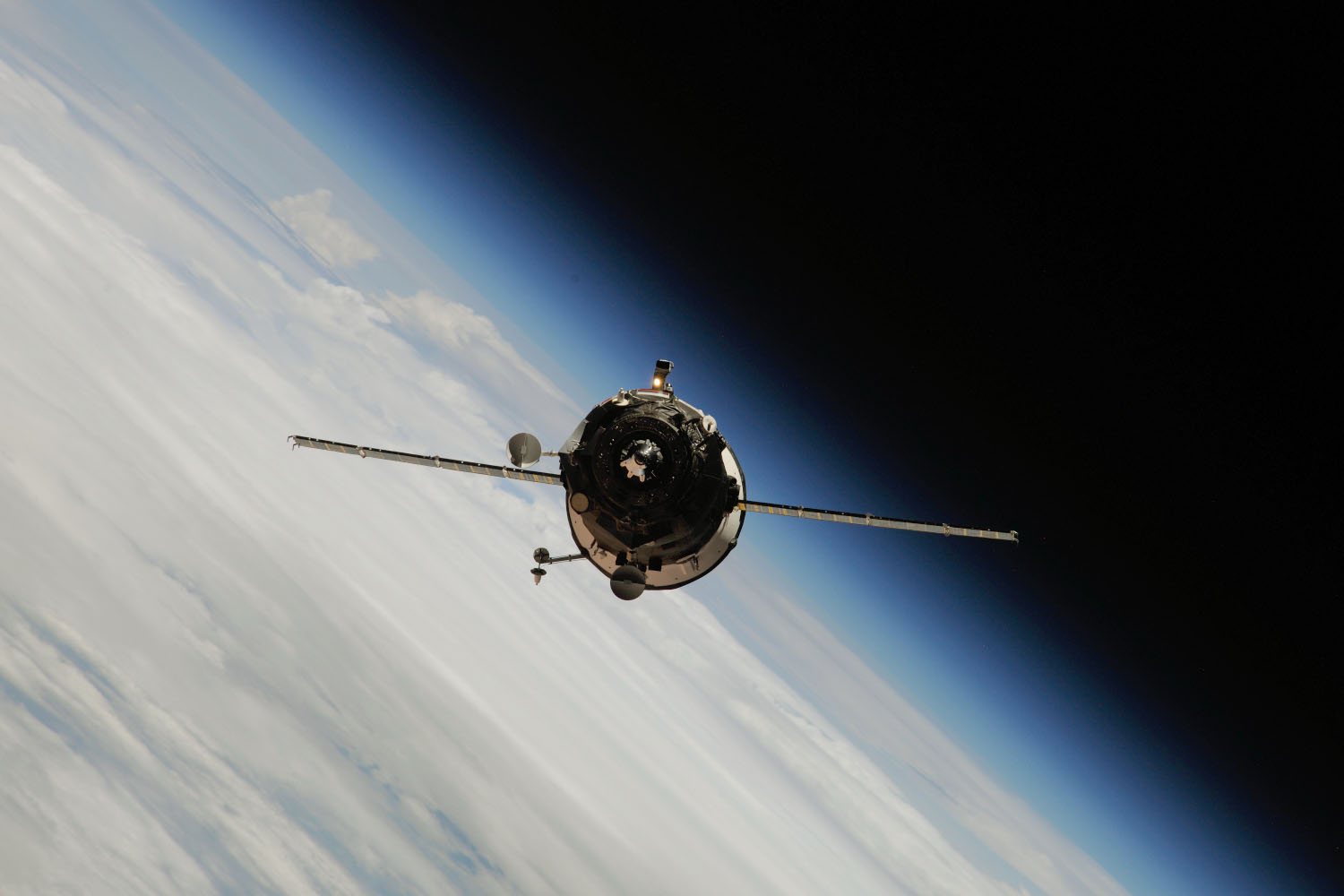
- Progress M-07M approaches the ISS on 12 September 2010.
- Mission type: ISS resupply
- Operator: Roskosmos
- COSPAR ID: 2010-044A
- SATCAT no.: 37156
- Mission duration: 163 days

Spacecraft properties
- Spacecraft type: Progress-M s/n 407
- Manufacturer: RKK Energia

Start of mission
- Launch date: 10 September 2010, 10:22:28 UTC
- Rocket: Soyuz-U
- Launch site: Baikonur, Site 31/6

End of mission
- Disposal: Deorbited
- Decay date: 20 February 2011

Orbital parameters
- Reference system: Geocentric
- Regime: Low Earth
- Inclination: 51.6°
- Epoch: 10 September 2010

Docking with ISS
- Docking port: Zvezda aft
- Docking date: 12 September 2010, 11:58 UTC
- Undocking date: 20 February 2011
- Time docked: 161 days

Cargo
- Mass: 2515 kg
- Pressurised: 1136 kg (dry cargo)
- Fuel: 1120 kg
- Gaseous: 49 kg (oxygen)
- Water: 210 kg
- Progress ISS Resupply

Progress M-07M (Russian: Прогресс М-07М), identified by NASA as Progress 39P, is a Progress spacecraft which was used to resupply the International Space Station. It was the seventh Progress-M 11F615A60 spacecraft to be launched, the fourth for the year 2010 and has the serial number 407. The spacecraft was manufactured by RKK Energia, and is being operated by the Russian Federal Space Agency. It arrived at the space station whilst the Expedition 24 crew was aboard, and will remain docked for the entirety of Expedition 25, before departing during Expedition 26.

== Launch and docking ==
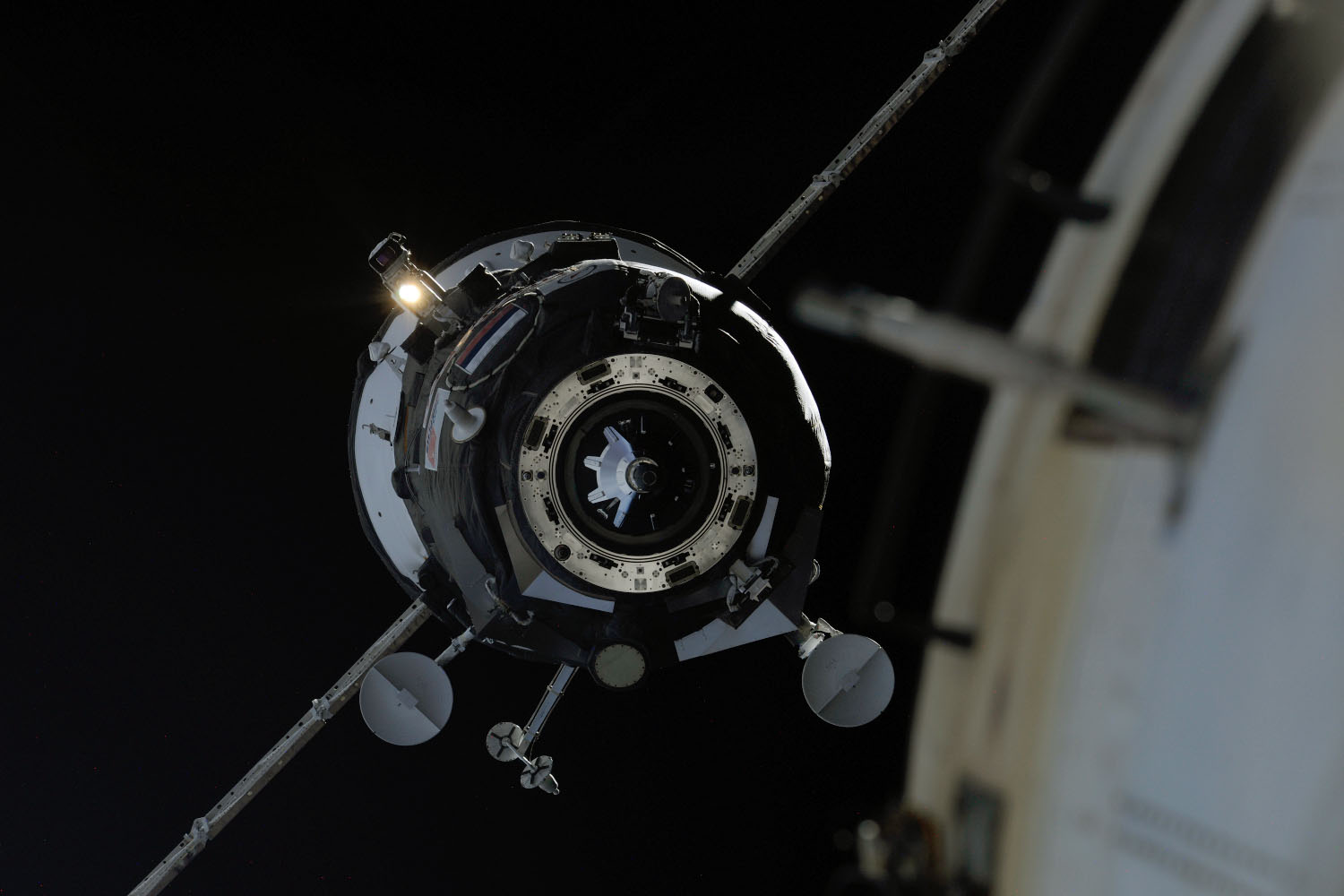
Progress M-07M approaches the ISS for docking on 12 September 2010.

Progress M-07M was launched by a Soyuz-U carrier rocket, flying from Site 31/6 at the Baikonur Cosmodrome. The launch occurred at 10:22:28 UTC on 10 September 2010. The launch had previously been scheduled to occur at 11:11 UTC on 8 September 2010, however it was delayed due to unfavorable weather conditions. After the launch the spacecraft reached a preliminary orbit of 195 by 238 kilometres (121 by 148 mi). A series of engine firings over the next two days guided Progress M-07M to the rendezvous.

Docking with the aft port of the Zvezda module of the ISS had been scheduled for around 12:37 UTC on 10 September 2010, however due to the launch delay, it occurred on 12 September at 11:58 UTC. The approval to begin the 11-minute final approach was issued by the Russian flight controllers after assessing the systems during a brief stationkeeping hold with about 167.6 metres (550 ft) between the space station and the Progress spacecraft. The docking was executed flawlessly by the Kurs automated rendezvous system.

== Cargo ==
Progress M-07M carried 2,515 kilograms (5,545 lb) of cargo to the International Space Station. This consisted of 1,120 kilograms (2,470 lb) of fuel, 49 kilograms (108 lb) of oxygen, and 210 kilograms (460 lb) of water. The remaining 1,136 kilograms (2,504 lb) was dry cargo, including components for the station's life support system, equipment for conducting maintenance and repairs, supplies for sanitation and hygiene, food, medical equipment, clothes and parcels for the cosmonauts aboard the station, cameras, and supplies for outfitting the Zarya, Poisk and Rassvet modules.

== Orbit raising manoeuvres ==
Progress M-07M was used for three manoeuvres to raise the orbit of the International Space Station. The first, which used eight of the Progress spacecraft's attitude control thrusters, was carried out on 15 September 2010. The engines ignited 09:04 UTC, and burned for 526 seconds, raising the orbit of the space station by 2 kilometres (1.2 mi) to 356 kilometres (221 mi), in preparation for the undocking and landing of Soyuz TMA-18 on 25 September 2010, and for the docking of Soyuz TMA-01M on 10 October 2010.

A second orbit raising manoeuvre was conducted at 19:41 UTC on 20 October 2010, in preparation for the docking of Progress M-08M. The manoeuvre lasted 228.7 seconds, and left the space station in an orbit with a perigee of 350.7 kilometres (217.9 mi) and an apogee of 375.7 kilometres (233.4 mi). Progress M-08M was launched on 27 October 2010, and successfully docked two days later.

The third manoeuvre was conducted on 22 December 2010, when eight thrusters were again used to raise the space station's orbit. This manoeuvre raised the orbit of the space station by 4.2 kilometres (2.6 mi) to 352.9 kilometres (219.3 mi) in preparation for the arrival of the Progress M-09M spacecraft, which is scheduled to launch on 28 January 2011, and for the docking of OV-103 on the STS-133 mission.

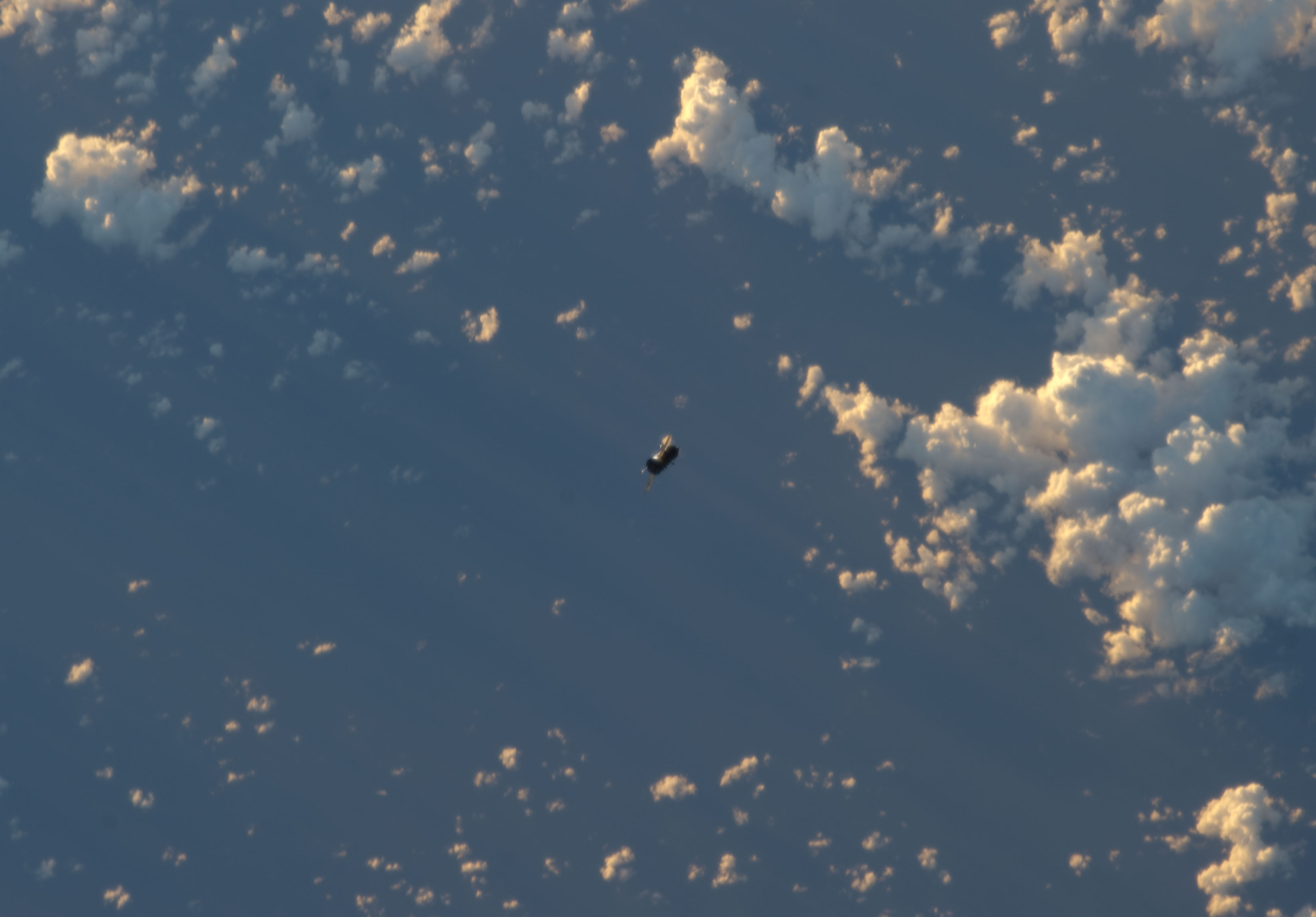
Progress M-07M seen shortly after undocking from the ISS.

== Undocking ==
It remained docked to the space station until 20 February 2011 when it undocked to make way for the Johannes Kepler Automated Transfer Vehicle. After undocking, it was deorbited to a destructive reentry over the spacecraft cemetery in the Pacific Ocean. Filled with trash and spent equipment on board the ISS, Progress M-07M drowned in the Pacific Ocean at 19:58 Moscow time.

== See also ==
- 2010 in spaceflight
- List of Progress flights
- Uncrewed spaceflights to the International Space Station
