= Progress M-05M =

Russian spacecraft

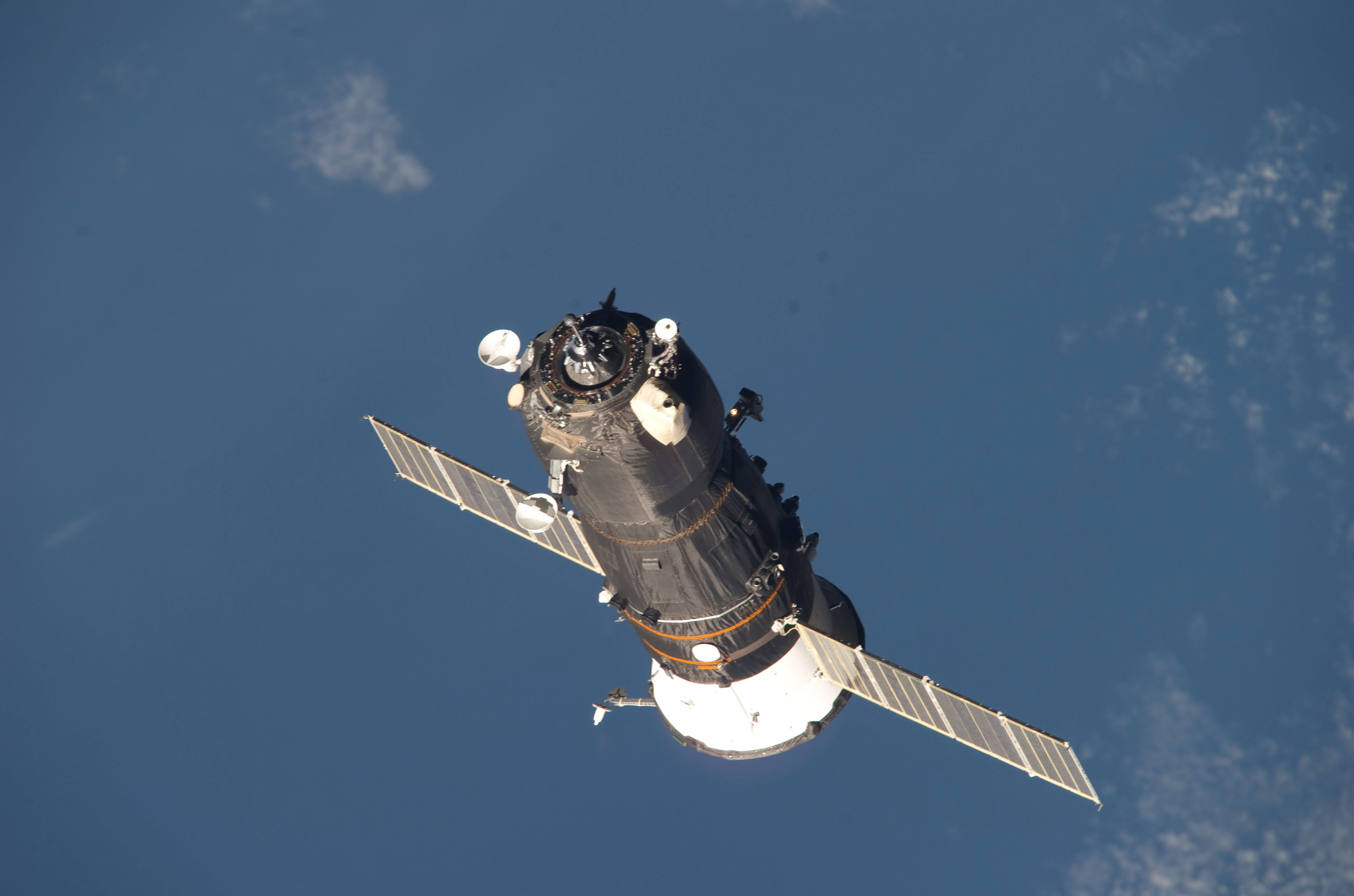
- Progress M-05M approaching the ISS.
- Mission type: ISS resupply
- Operator: Roskosmos
- COSPAR ID: 2010-018A
- SATCAT no.: 36521
- Mission duration: 201 days

Spacecraft properties
- Spacecraft type: Progress-M s/n 405
- Manufacturer: RKK Energia

Start of mission
- Launch date: 28 April 2010, 17:15 UTC
- Rocket: Soyuz-U
- Launch site: Baikonur, Site 1/5

End of mission
- Disposal: Deorbited
- Decay date: 15 November 2010

Orbital parameters
- Reference system: Geocentric
- Regime: Low Earth
- Inclination: 51.6°
- Epoch: 28 April 2010

Docking with ISS
- Docking port: Pirs
- Docking date: 1 May 2010, 18:30 UTC
- Undocking date: 25 October 2010, 14:25 UTC
- Time docked: 177 days

Cargo
- Mass: 2400 kg
- Pressurised: 1497 kg (dry cargo)
- Fuel: 870 kg
- Water: 100 kg
- Progress ISS Resupply

Progress M-05M (Russian: Прогресс М-05М), identified by NASA as Progress 37P, is a Progress spacecraft launched by the Russian Federal Space Agency in April 2010 to resupply the International Space Station (ISS). The spacecraft carried fresh food and supplies for the ISS crew. Progress M-05M also hauled some special care packages for the station crew that included confectioneries, books and new movies.

== Launch ==
Launch of the Soyuz rocket carrying Progress M-05M.

The launch of Progress M-05M, which occurred at 17:15 UTC on 28 April 2010, was conducted from Site 1/5 at the Baikonur Cosmodrome, using a Soyuz-U carrier rocket.

The Progress M-05M spacecraft arrived at the Baikonur Cosmodrome by train on 19 March 2010. Shortly after delivery, initial tests of its electronics and Kurs docking system began, which were completed by 29 March 2010. Further testing was subsequently conducted using an acoustic chamber between 1 and 3 April 2010. It then underwent a series of leak checks in a vacuum chamber. The spacecraft was fuelled for its mission on 19 April 2010, and mated to its launch adaptor on 21 April 2010. On 22 April 2010, the spacecraft underwent a final inspection before it was encapsulated in the payload fairing It was then transported to the MIK integration building for installation atop the carrier rocket, on 24 April 2010. It was rolled to the launch pad on 26 April 2010, and successfully launched two days later.

== Docking ==
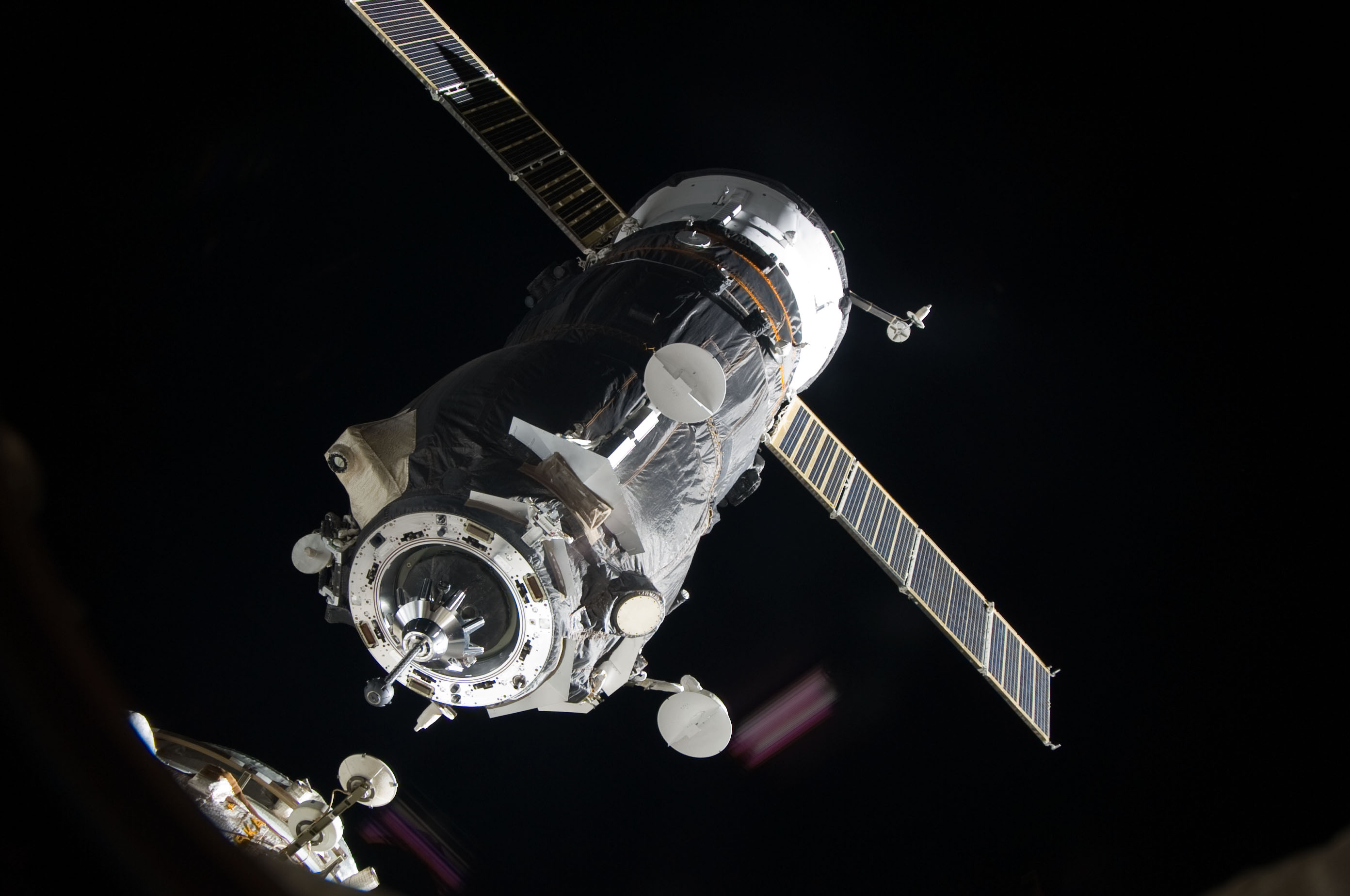
Progress M-05M approaches the ISS for docking.

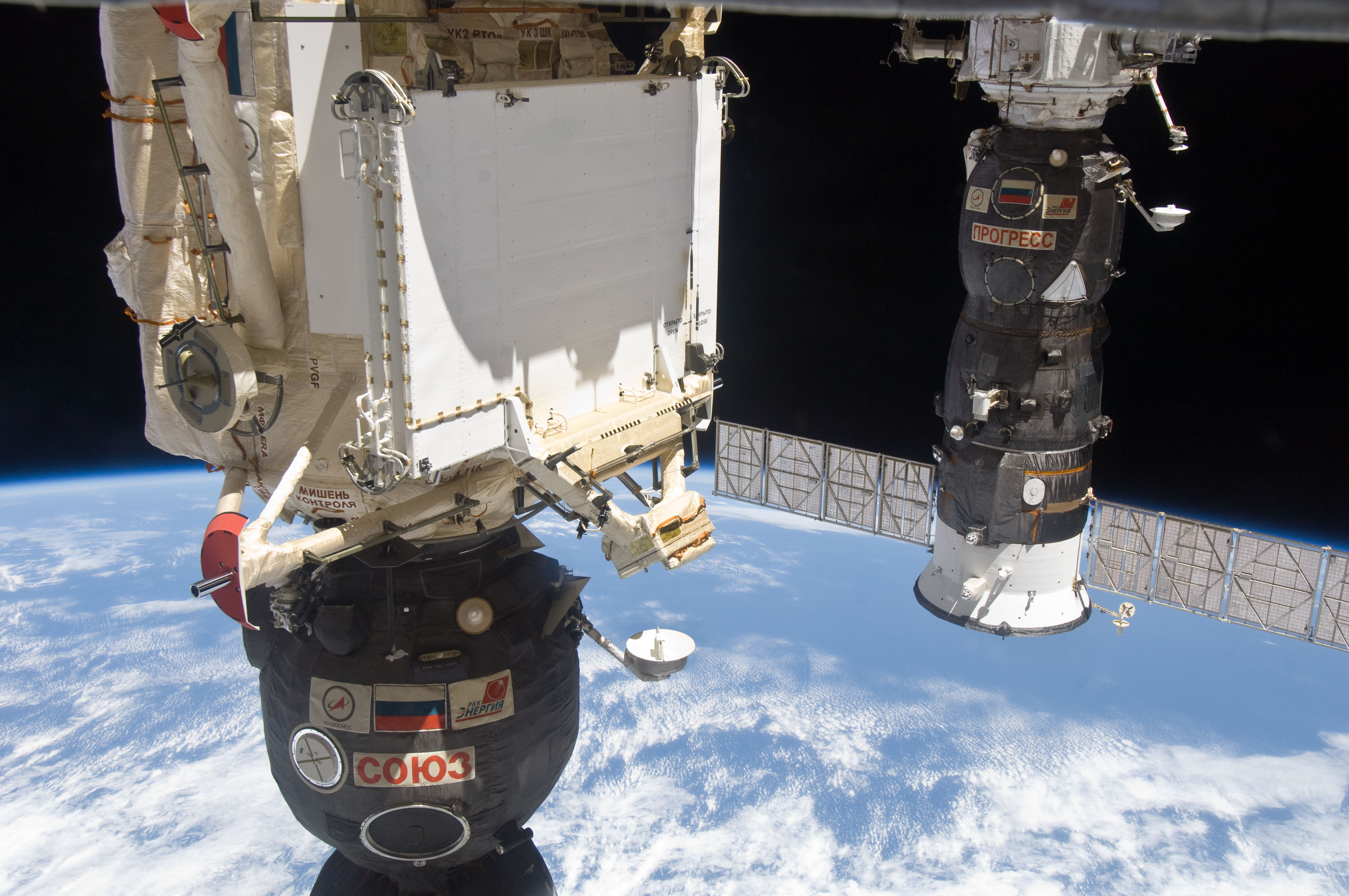
Progress M-05M (background) is docked to the Pirs Docking Compartment.

Following three days of free flight, Progress M-05M docked with the Pirs module of the ISS at 18:30 UTC on 1 May 2010. During rendezvous operations, when Progress M-05M was about a kilometre from the station, its Kurs docking system failed. Cosmonaut Oleg Kotov used the backup TORU system to manually control the rendezvous and docking, setting a record for the furthest distance a Progress spacecraft was flown under manual control.

The Progress M-03M spacecraft, which had previously been occupying the Pirs docking port, departed on 22 April 2010 to make way for Progress M-05M.

== Undocking ==
Progress M-05M remained docked with the space station until 25 October 2010. The spacecraft undocked from the Pirs docking compartment at 14:25 UTC on 25 October 2010. Expedition 25 Flight Engineer Fyodor Yurchikhin closed and performed leak checks on the hatch between the space station and Progress M-05M on 22 October 2010, completing preparations for the spacecraft's undocking. The undocking of Progress M-05M cleared the way for the launch of the Progress M-08M spacecraft on 27 October 2010 from the Baikonur Cosmodrome. On 30 October 2010, Progress M-08M docked to the Pirs docking compartment vacated by Progress M-05M.

== Decay ==
After undocking, the spacecraft was transferred to a lower orbit. The Progress M-05M spacecraft spent 21 days orbiting a safe distance from the space station. The autonomous mission enabled Russian scientists to conduct geophysical experiments before spacecraft's demise.

On 15 November 2010, Progress M-05M was deorbited and drowned in the South Pacific Ocean several thousand kilometers East of New Zealand. Progress engines were activated by the onboard computer and retroburn was initiated at 8:50 UTC. The main engine operated for 186.2 seconds, providing the braking burn of 89.7 mps to the spacecraft. The remaining parts of the Progress M-05M, not burnt during the reentry fell down in the area of 47°57' South and 220°44'West at about 9:35 UTC.
