= Expedition 25 =

25th expedition to the International Space Station

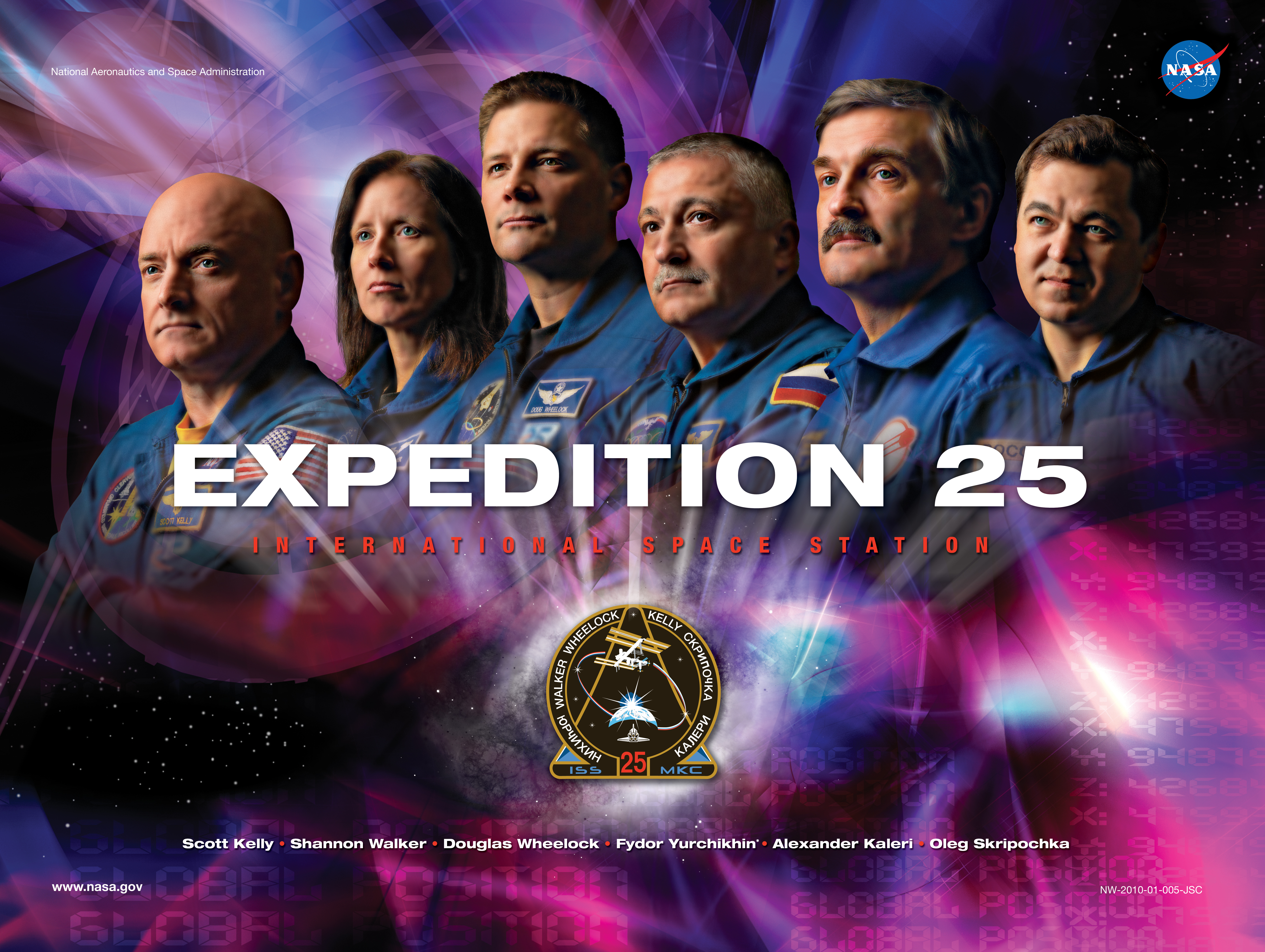
- Promotional Poster
- Mission type: Long-duration expedition

Expedition
- Space station: International Space Station
- Began: 25 September 2010, 02:02 UTC
- Ended: 26 November 2010, 04:46 UTC
- Arrived aboard: Soyuz TMA-19; Soyuz TMA-01M
- Departed aboard: Soyuz TMA-19; Soyuz TMA-01M

Crew
- Crew size: 6
- Members: Expedition 24/25: Douglas H. Wheelock; Shannon Walker; Fyodor Yurchikhin Expedition 25/26: Scott J. Kelly; Aleksandr Kaleri; Oleg Skripochka
- EVAs: 1
- EVA duration: 6 hours, 27 minutes
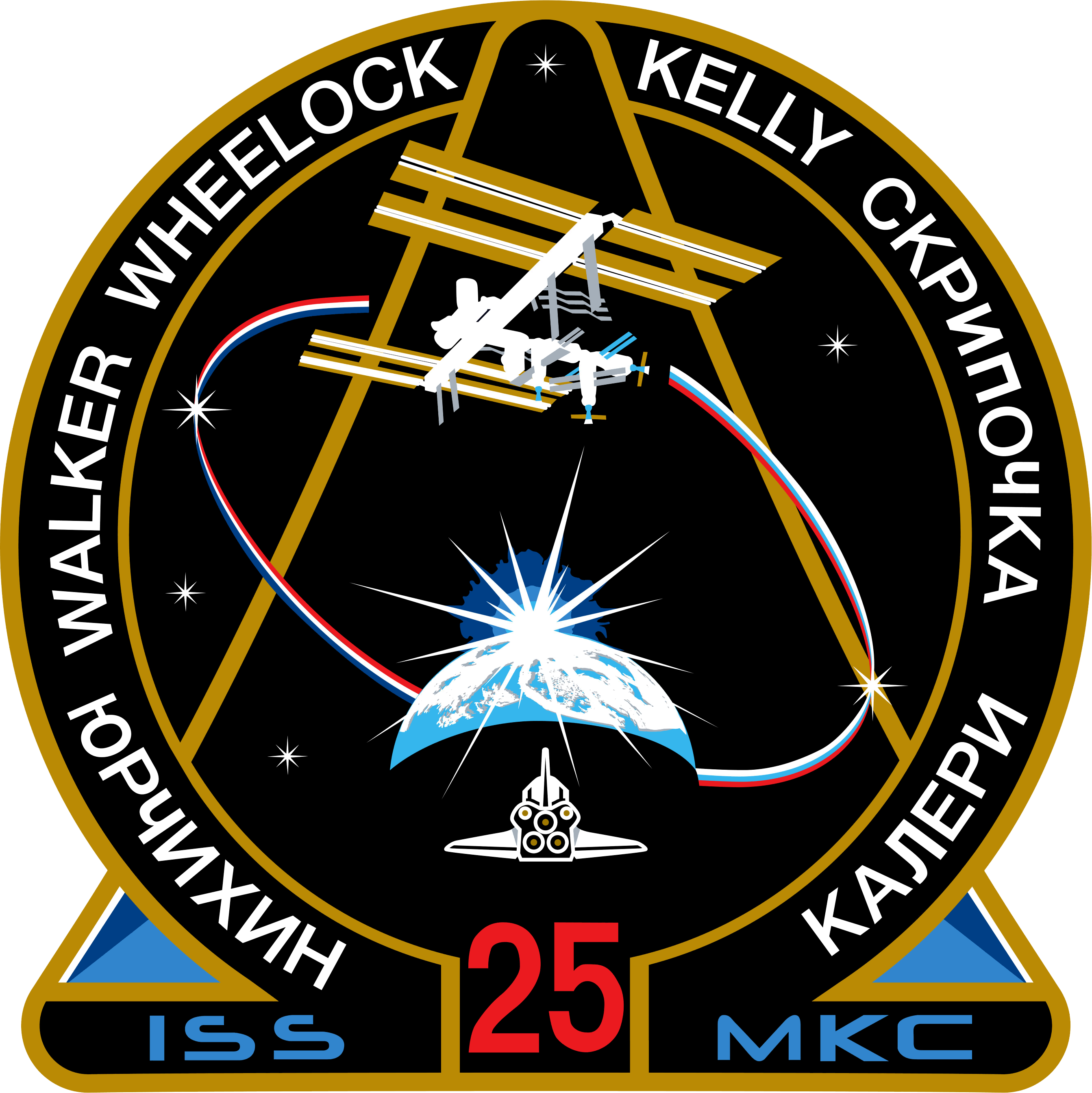
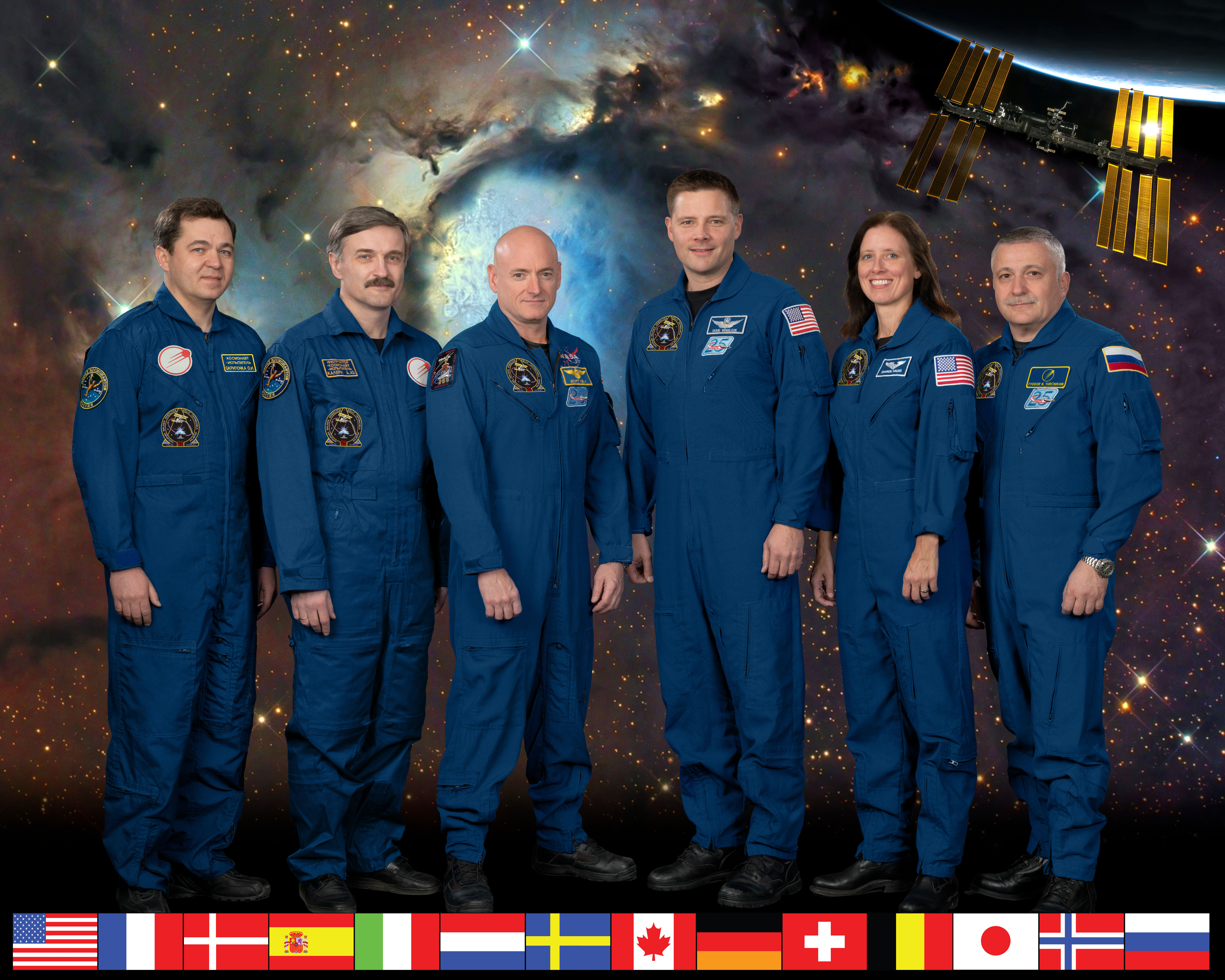
- Expedition 25 mission patch (l-r) Skripochka, Kaleri, Kelly, Wheelock, Walker and Yurchikhin ISS expeditions

Expedition 25 was the 25th long-duration mission to the International Space Station (ISS). Expedition 25 began with the Soyuz TMA-18 undocking on 25 September 2010. Three new crewmembers (Scott Kelly, Alexander Kaleri and Oleg Skripochka) arrived aboard the ISS 10 October 2010 on Soyuz TMA-01M to join Douglas Wheelock, Fyodor Yurchikhin and Shannon Walker, and formed the full six member crew of Expedition 25. NASA astronaut Doug Wheelock accepted command of Expedition 25 on 22 September 2010, taking over from Russia's Aleksandr Skvortsov. The departure of Wheelock, Walker and Yurchikhin on 25 November 2010 marked the official end of Expedition 25.

During Expedition 25 the Progress M-08M spacecraft visited the ISS, docking with the space station on 30 October 2010 bringing 2.5 tons of cargo supplies. Space shuttle Discovery on its STS-133 mission was scheduled to arrive at the ISS on 3 November 2010 but was rescheduled for launch on 3 February 2011. The 10th anniversary of human life, work and research on the ISS fell during Expedition 25. On 2 November 2000, Expedition 1 commander William Shepherd and flight engineers Sergei Krikalev and Yuri Gidzenko became the first residents of the space station. Expedition 25 ended on 26 November.

== Crew ==
Position	First part (September 2010)	Second part (October 2010 to November 2010)
Commander	Douglas H. Wheelock, NASA; Second spaceflight	
Flight Engineer 1	Shannon Walker, NASA; First spaceflight	
Flight Engineer 2	Fyodor Yurchikhin, RSA; Third spaceflight	
Flight Engineer 3		Scott J. Kelly, NASA; Third spaceflight
Flight Engineer 4		Aleksandr Kaleri, RSA; Fifth and last spaceflight
Flight Engineer 5		Oleg Skripochka, RSA; First spaceflight

Source
NASA

== Backup crew ==
- Andrei Borisenko – Commander
- Paolo Nespoli
- Catherine Coleman
- Anatoli Ivanishin
- Sergei Revin
- Ronald J. Garan, Jr.

== Preflight preparations ==
At the Baikonur Cosmodrome in Kazakhstan, Expedition 25 Soyuz Commander Alexander Kaleri, NASA Flight Engineer Scott Kelly and Russian Flight Engineer Oleg Skripochka participated in a variety of activities from 26 September to 4 October 2010 as they prepared for their launch on 8 October 2010 (7 October 2010 U.S. Eastern time) in their Soyuz TMA-01M spacecraft to the International Space Station. The footage includes the crew's arrival in Baikonur, their suited and unsuited fit checks in their Soyuz spacecraft, the raising of flags outside their Cosmonaut Hotel crew quarters and other traditional activities. The Soyuz TMA-01M spacecraft was mated to its booster in a processing facility for its rollout to the launch pad in Baikonur 5 October 2010.

The Soyuz TMA-01M spacecraft and booster rocket were moved to Launch Complex 5 (Complex 17P32-5) at Baikonur Cosmodrome on a rail-car 5 October 2010 for final preparations prior to launch.

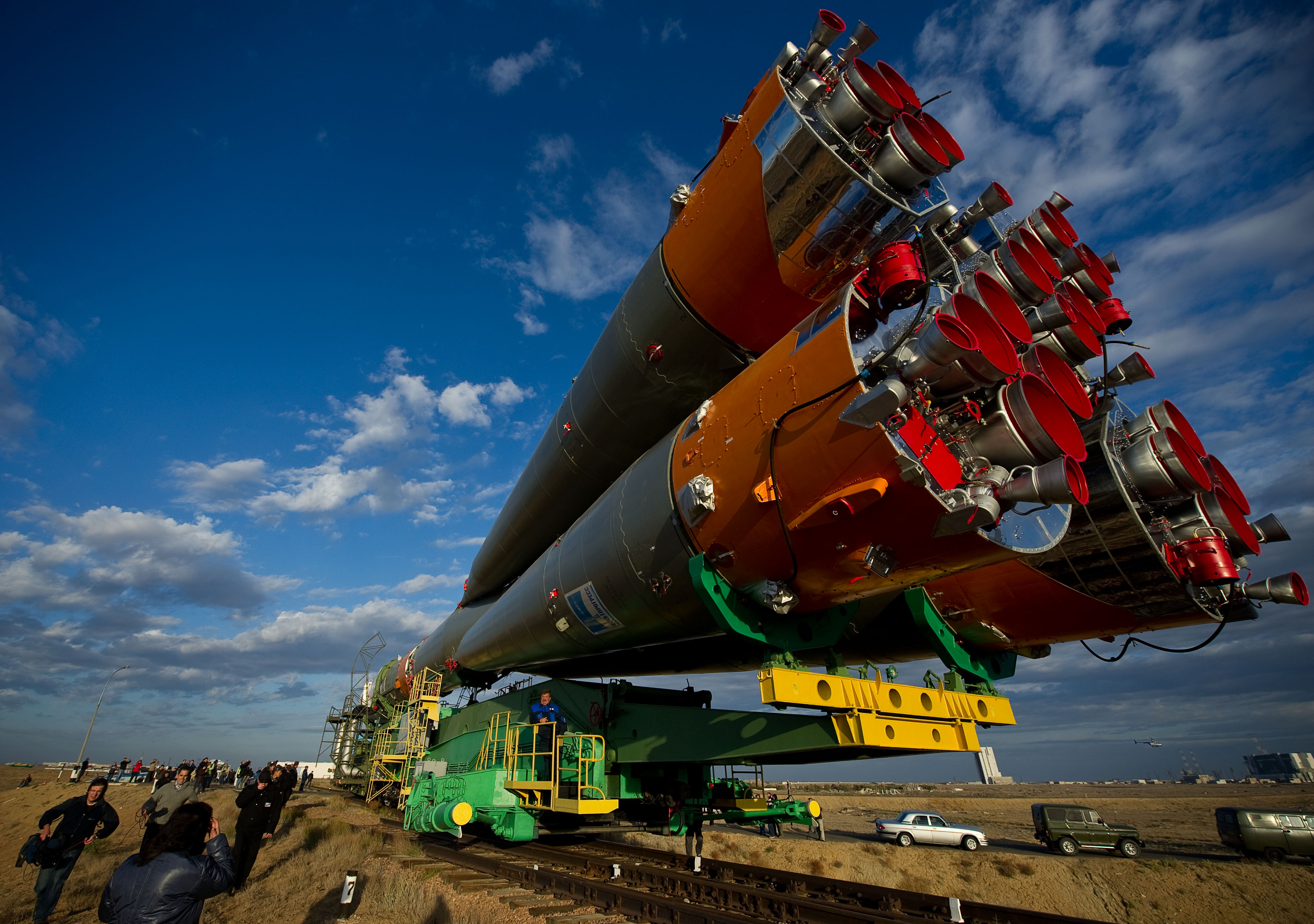
The Soyuz TMA-01M spacecraft is rolled out by train to the launch pad.

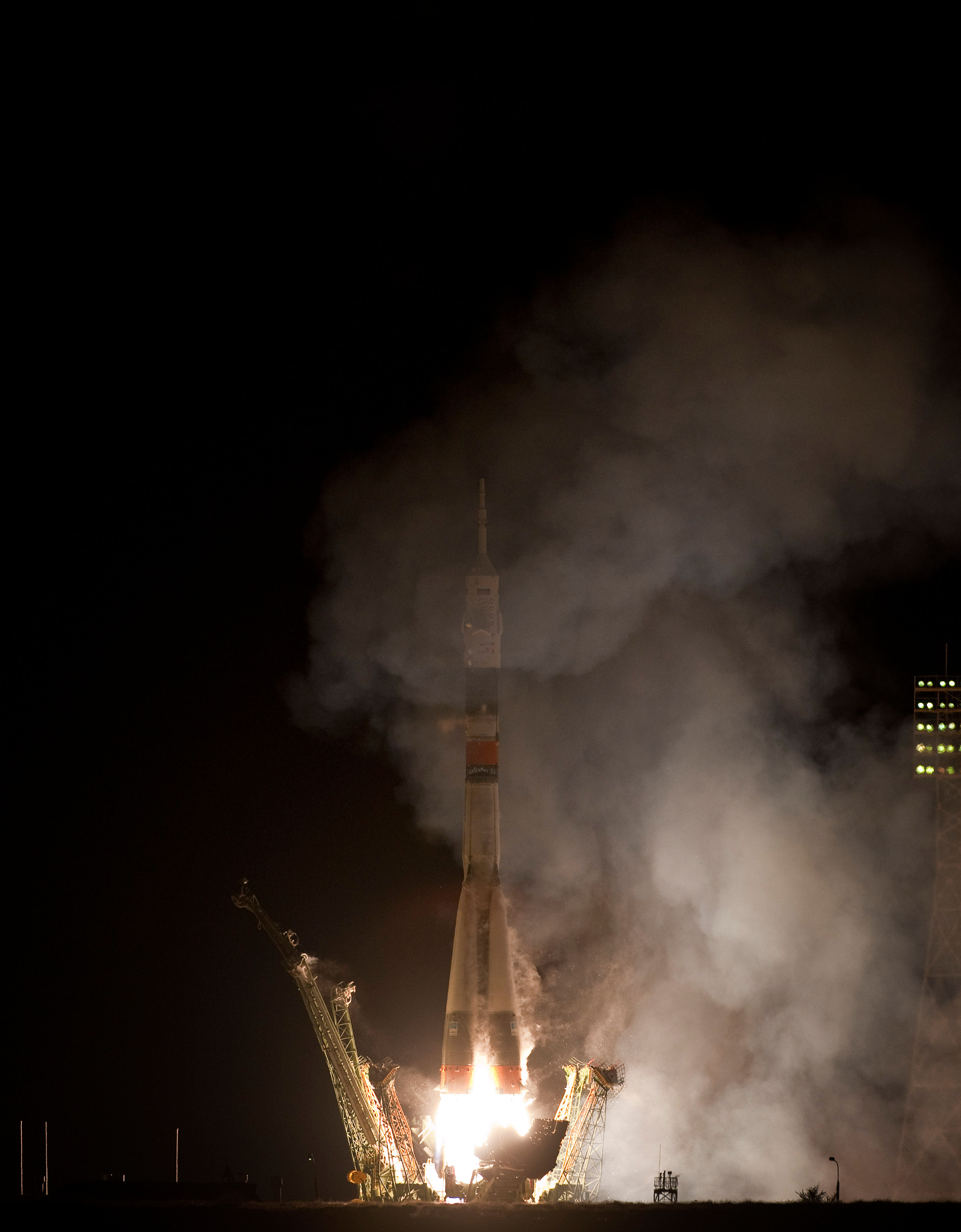
The Soyuz TMA-01M rocket launches from the Baikonur Cosmodrome in Kazakhstan at 7:10 pm. EDT on Thursday, 7 October 2010.

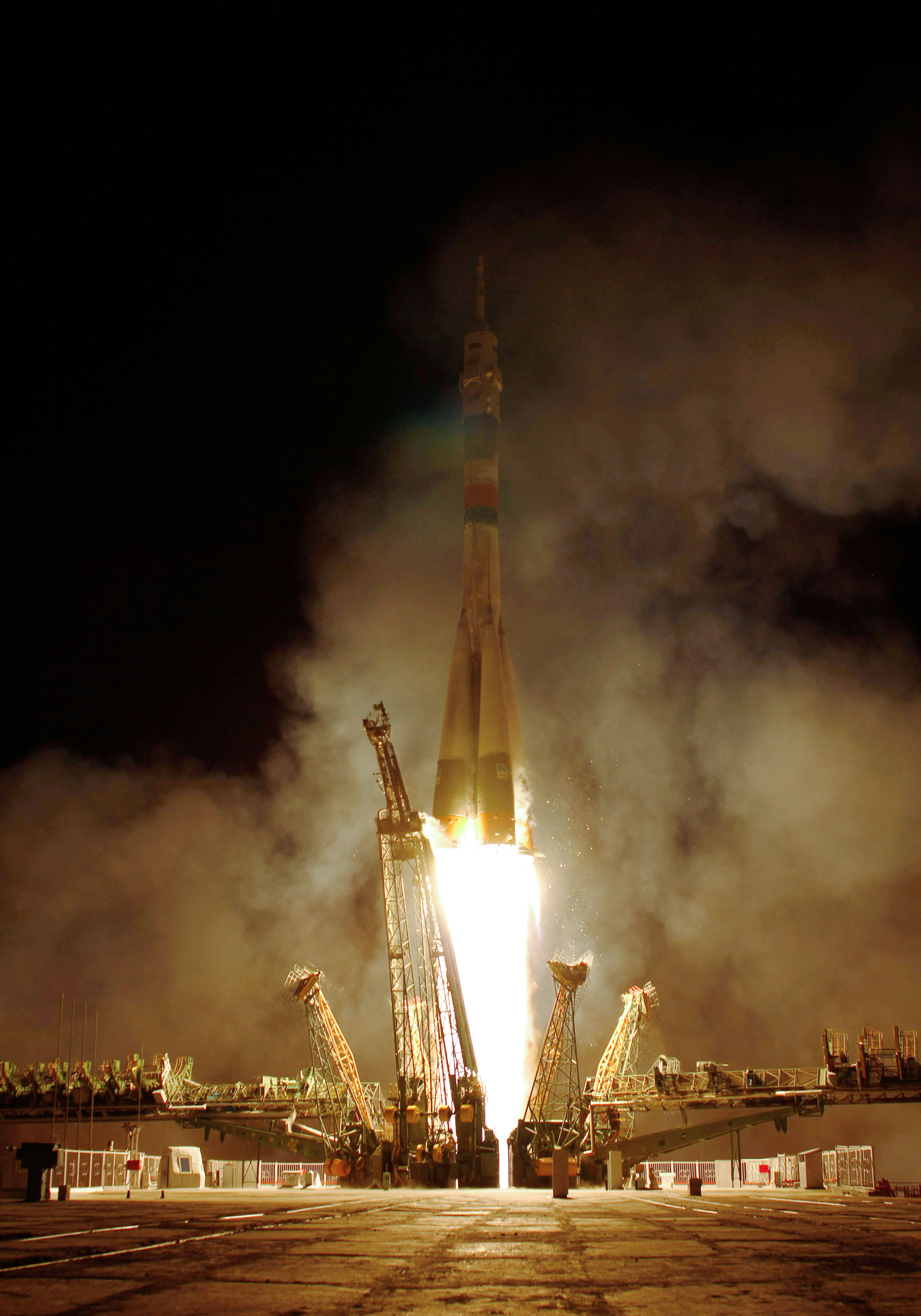

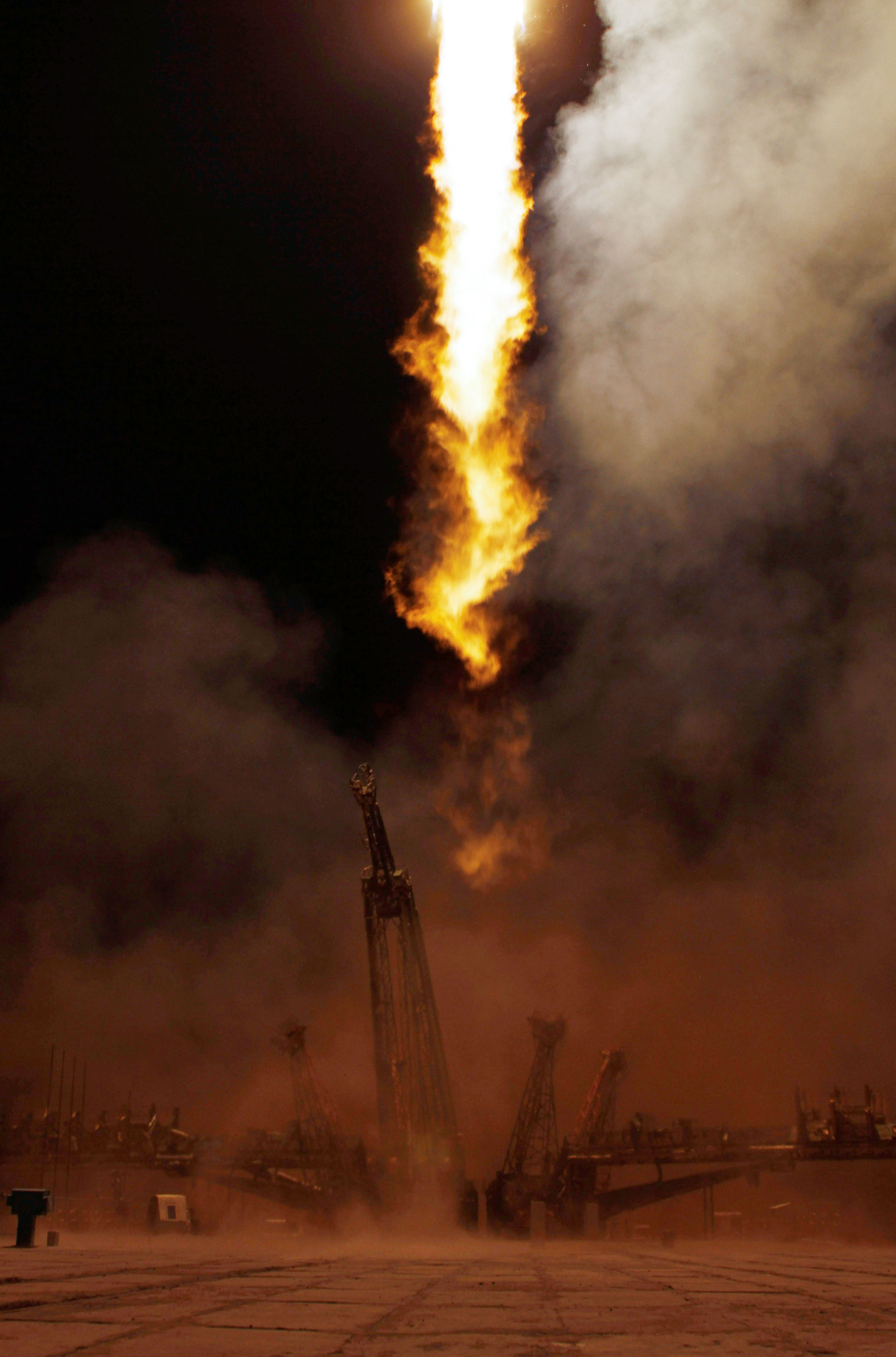

== Experiments ==
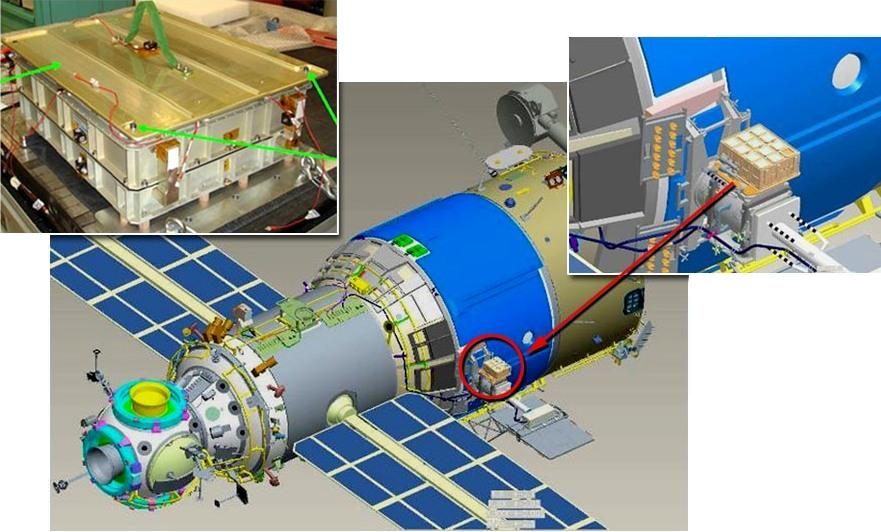
EXPOSE-R payload.

Russian Federal Space Agency revealed that during Expedition 25 and 26, 504 sessions of 41 experiments (34 experiments from previous Expeditions and seven new experiments) are planned to be implemented. The new experiments include, Molniya-Gamma, Sprut-2, UHF-radiometry, SLS, VIRU, Test and Colon Crystal.

Experiments to be carried out include:

Field	Experiment	Notes
Life science	Sonocard, Pilot, Vzaimodeystviye, Tipologia, Pneumocard, Sprut-2, Biorisk	The Biorisk experiment aims to study the effects of microbial bacteria and fungus on structural materials used in spacecraft construction.
Geophysical research	Relaxation, Uragan, Impulse, Vsplesk, Shadow-Beacon, Molniya-Gamma	The Molniya-Gamma experiment measures gamma rays and optical radiation during terrestrial lightning and thunder conditions to study terrestrial gamma-ray flashes and upper-atmospheric lightning.
Remote sensing	MW-radiometry, Rusalka, Zeiner, Econ	The Rusalka experiment is a test of procedures for remote determination of Methane and Carbon Dioxide content in the Earth's atmosphere.
Space biotechnology	Lactolen, Biotrek, Biodegradatsia, Zhinseng-2, Structure, Constanta	
Technical research	Vektor-T, Izgib, Identification, Veterok, SLS, Sreda-MKS, Contur, VIRU, Bar, Test, RadioSkaf	
Contract activities	EXPOSE-R	Expose-R experiment is a European Space Agency (ESA) experiment designed to expose organic material to the extreme environment of space.
Study of cosmic rays	BTN-Neutron, Matryoshka-R	
Educational and humanitarian projects	MAI-75, Colon Crystal	
Space technology and material science	Crystallizator, Plasma crystal	

== Mission highlights ==
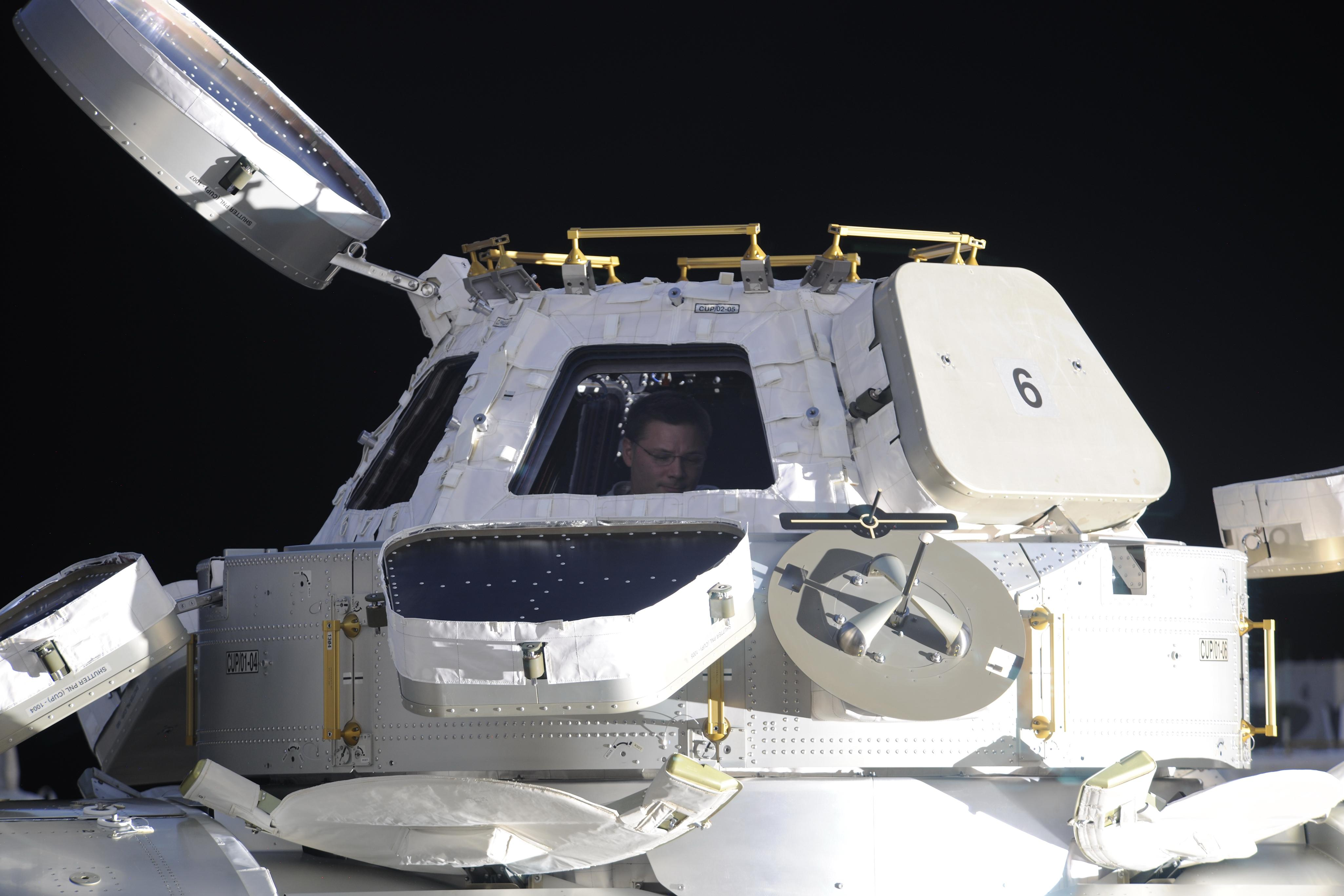
Expedition 25 commander Douglas Wheelock in the Cupola.

=== Progress M-05M undocking ===
The Russian resupply spacecraft Progress M-05M, which came to the station in May 2010, was undocked on 25 October 2010 to make room for another resupply spacecraft – Progress M-08M.

=== Progress M-08M ===
Progress M-08M spacecraft delivered about 2.5 tons of cargo supplies including water, air, fuel and hardware for the Russian Molniya-Gamma and Coulomb Crystal experiments to the station.

The Soyuz-U carrier rocket with Progress M-08M, identified by NASA as Progress 40 or 40P, was launched from the Baikonur's Gagarin's launch pad at 15:11:50 UTC on 27 October 2010. After three days of autonomous flight, at 16:36 UTC on 30 October 2010 Progress M-08M docked with the Pirs module nadir port. A problem during Progress' approach to the space station forced cosmonauts on the station to intervene. During station-keeping as part of the rendezvous operations, flight controllers in Moscow instructed cosmonaut Alexander Kaleri to activate the TORU manual docking equipment and take over the piloting tasks from the Progress' autonomous KURS system. The switch to manual mode was decided at range of 194 m. Kaleri worked inside the space station's Zvezda module to fly Progress M-08M remotely using television views and a pair of joysticks and guided it to the successful docking.

== Spacewalks ==
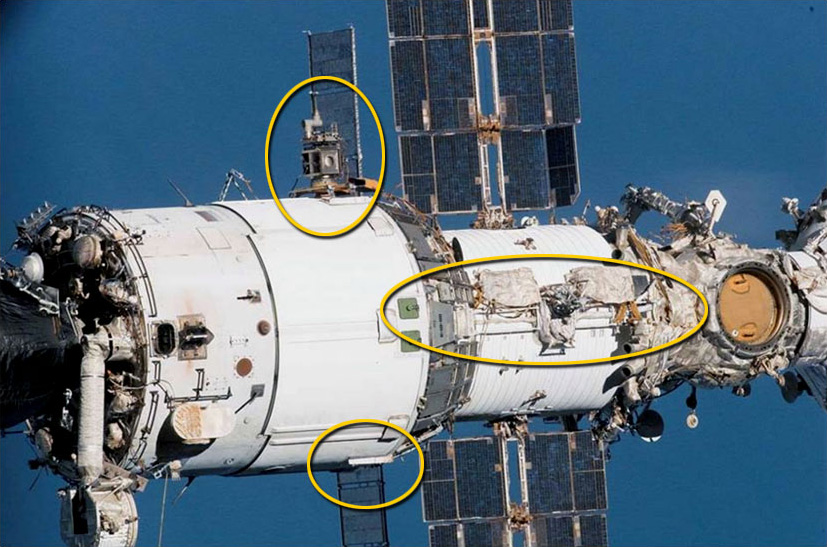
Russian EVA 26 worksites.

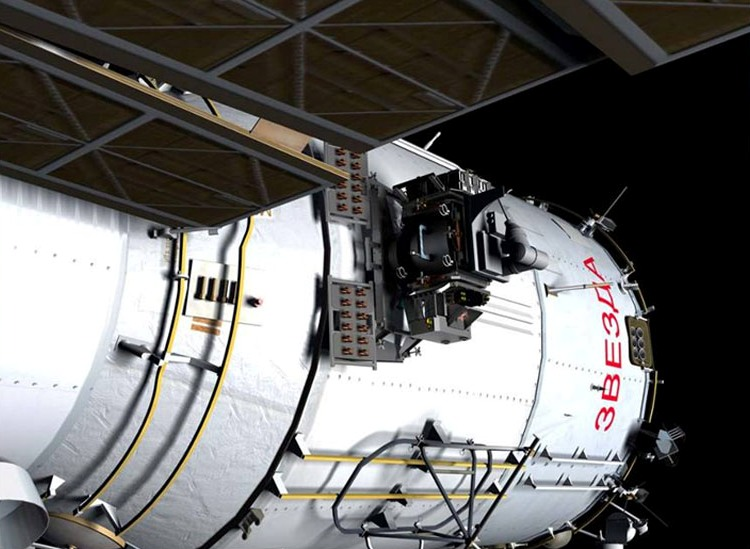
Multipurpose workstation on Zvezda module.

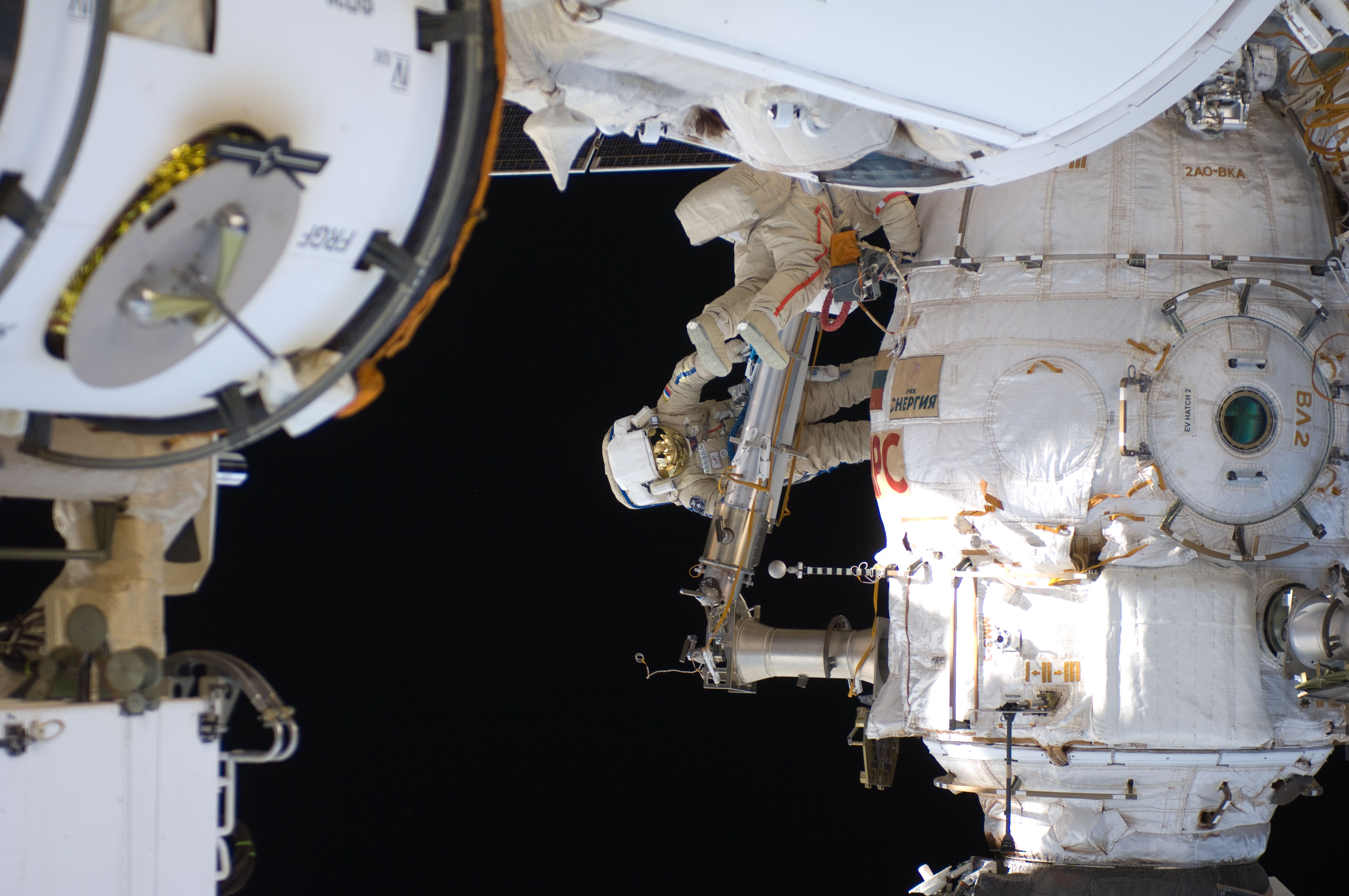
Fyodor Yurchikhin (red stripes) and Oleg Skripochka (blue stripes) participate in the spacewalk.

Mission	Spacewalkers	Start (UTC)	End (UTC)	Duration
Expedition 25; EVA 1 ‡	Fyodor Yurchikhin; Oleg Skripochka	15 November 2010; 14:55	15 November 2010; 21:22	6 hours and 27 minutes
Expedition 25; EVA 1 ‡	Yurchikhin and Skripochka installed a portable multipurpose workstation in Plane IV in the Zvezda large diameter and installed struts between Poisk module and Zvezda module and Poisk module and Zarya module. They performed an experiment called Test, which was aimed at verifying the existence of micro organisms or contamination underneath insulation on the Russian segment of the ISS. Yurchikhin and Skripochka photographed and installed the protective cover and disconnected and removed the Plasma Pulse Injector Science hardware from the portable multipurpose workstation in Plane II of the Zvezda. They cleaned the Kontur science hardware (ROKVISS) with dry towels and then disconnected and then removed it. Yurchikhin and Skripochka also installed the protective cover and disconnected and removed the Expose-R scientific experiment from the portable multipurpose workstation in Plane II of the Zvezda module. The Kontur experiment studied remote object control capability for robotic arms and the Expose-R experiment is a European Space Agency experiment designed to expose organic material to the extreme environment of space. Yurchikhin and Skripochka installed an oft hand-rail on Pirs docking module and installed the SKK #1-M2 cassette on Poisk module. The cosmonauts also removed a television camera from the Rassvet module; however, they were unsuccessful in relocating the camera due to interference with insulation where it was to be installed.			

‡ denotes spacewalks performed from the Pirs docking compartment in Russian Orlan suits.
