= Soyuz TMA-01M =

2010 Russian crewed spaceflight to the ISS

- Operator: Roscosmos
- COSPAR ID: 2010-052A
- SATCAT no.: 37183
- Mission duration: 159 days, 8 hours, 43 minutes

Spacecraft properties
- Spacecraft type: Soyuz-TMA 11F747
- Manufacturer: Energia

Crew
- Crew size: 3
- Members: Aleksandr Kaleri; Oleg Skripochka; Scott Kelly
- Callsign: Ингул ("Ingul")

Start of mission
- Launch date: 7 October 2010, 23:10:55 UTC
- Rocket: Soyuz-FG
- Launch site: Baikonur 1/5

End of mission
- Landing date: 16 March 2011, 7:54 UTC

Orbital parameters
- Reference system: Geocentric
- Regime: Low Earth
- Perigee altitude: 199.85 kilometres (124.18 mi)
- Apogee altitude: 258.77 kilometres (160.79 mi)
- Inclination: 51.63 degrees

Docking with ISS
- Docking port: Poisk zenith
- Docking date: 10 October 2010; 00:01 UTC
- Undocking date: 16 March 2011; 04:27 UTC
- Time docked: 157d 4h 26m
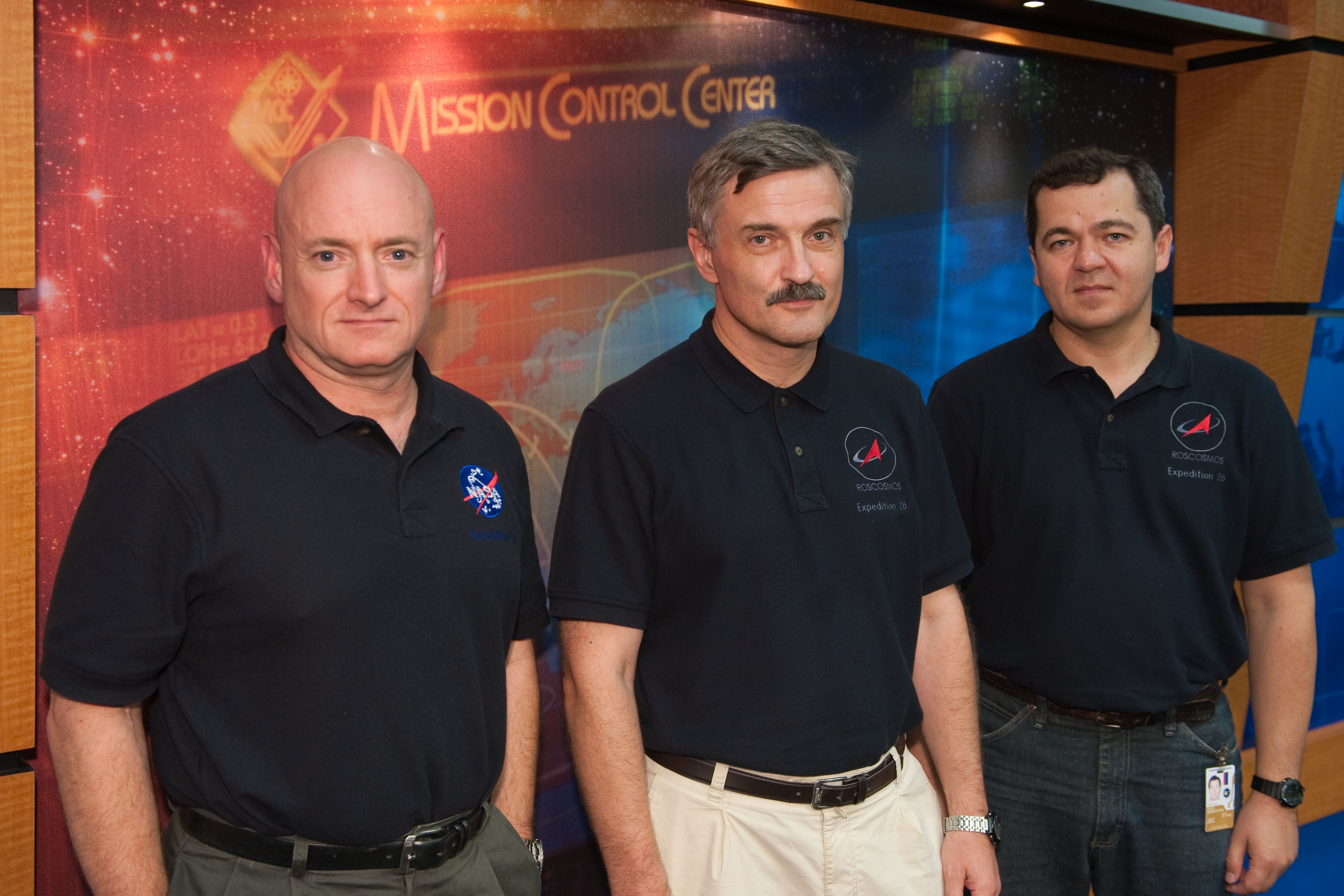
- From left to right: Kelly, Kaleri and Skripochka Soyuz programme (Crewed missions)

Soyuz TMA-01M was a Soyuz flight that transported three members of the Expedition 25 crew to the International Space Station. TMA-01M was the 107th flight of a Soyuz spacecraft, and the first flight of the modernized TMA-M series. The spacecraft remained docked to the space station during Expedition 25, to serve as an emergency escape vehicle. The spacecraft's COSPAR ID was 2010-052A.

== Crew ==
The Soyuz TMA-01M crew was confirmed by NASA on 21 November 2008.

Position	Crew member
Commander	(Russia) Aleksandr Kaleri, Roscosmos; Expedition 25; Fifth and last spaceflight
Flight Engineer 1	(Russia) Oleg Skripochka, Roscosmos; Expedition 25; First spaceflight
Flight Engineer 2	(United States) Scott Kelly, NASA; Expedition 25; Third spaceflight

=== Backup crew ===
Position	Crew member
Commander	(Russia) Sergey Volkov, Roscosmos
Flight Engineer 1	(Russia) Oleg Kononenko, Roscosmos
Flight Engineer 2	(United States) Ronald Garan, NASA

== Spacecraft ==
Soyuz TMA-01M is the first spacecraft of the new modernized Soyuz TMA-M series, developed and built by Energia as an upgrade of the baseline Soyuz-TMA, which has been in use since 2002. 36 obsolete pieces of equipment have been replaced with 19 new-generation devices and the vehicle's total mass has been reduced by 70 kilograms (154 lbs). In particular, the old Argon-16 computer control system, which has been used on Soyuz ships for more than 30 years, has been replaced with a new digital onboard computer, the TsVM-101. Power consumption has been reduced throughout the ship. There are also changes to the spacecraft's structure, such as replacing the magnesium alloy used in the instrument module frame by aluminium alloy, to make the ship easier to manufacture.

The modernized Soyuz ship will also enable engineers to test new equipment which may also be used in Russia's next generation crewed space ship that is currently under development.

NASA astronaut Scott Kelly, part of Soyuz TMA-01M's crew, praised the ship's new displays, saying that they make flying easier and less operator intensive.

Two flight development tests are planned: Soyuz TMA-01M and Soyuz TMA-02M. The third ship, Soyuz TMA-03M will be used for qualification tests. In addition to verifying the nominal operation of the spaceship, the testing will include verification of off-nominal modes, such as manual attitude control, issuing of orbital maneuvering pulses using four berthing and attitude thrusters, and flying around the ISS in manual control mode.

After the launch of Soyuz TMA-01M, Russian space officials said the new spacecraft performed normally with no problems of any significance. "Soyuz TMA-01M is a digital spacecraft, digital vehicle. As you saw today, it worked extremely well, it was an automatic flight, 100 percent automatic," said Vitaly Lopota, president RSC Energia.

== Mission highlights ==
=== Launch ===
The spacecraft lifted off aboard a Soyuz-FG rocket from the Baikonur Cosmodrome at 23:10:55 UTC on Thursday, 7 October 2010 (5:10:55 AM Friday at local time). In 9 minutes, the vehicle reached low Earth orbit with the following parameters: min altitude – 199,85 km; max altitude – 258,77 km; revolution – 88,81 min; inclination– 51,63 degrees. Soon after the orbital insertion, the spacecraft unfolded its solar panels and antennas, and flight control gave the ship green light for starting its approach to the International Space Station.

=== Docking ===
The Soyuz TMA-01M spacecraft linked up with the space station at 00:01 UTC on Sunday, 10 October 2010, precisely one minute ahead of schedule. Docking to the Poisk module occurred when both spacecraft were flying more than 220 miles (354 km) above the southern Pacific Ocean, just off the coast from Chile. A few moments later, hooks and latches engaged to pull the spacecraft firmly into place and after extensive leak checks, hatches were opened at 03:09 UTC.

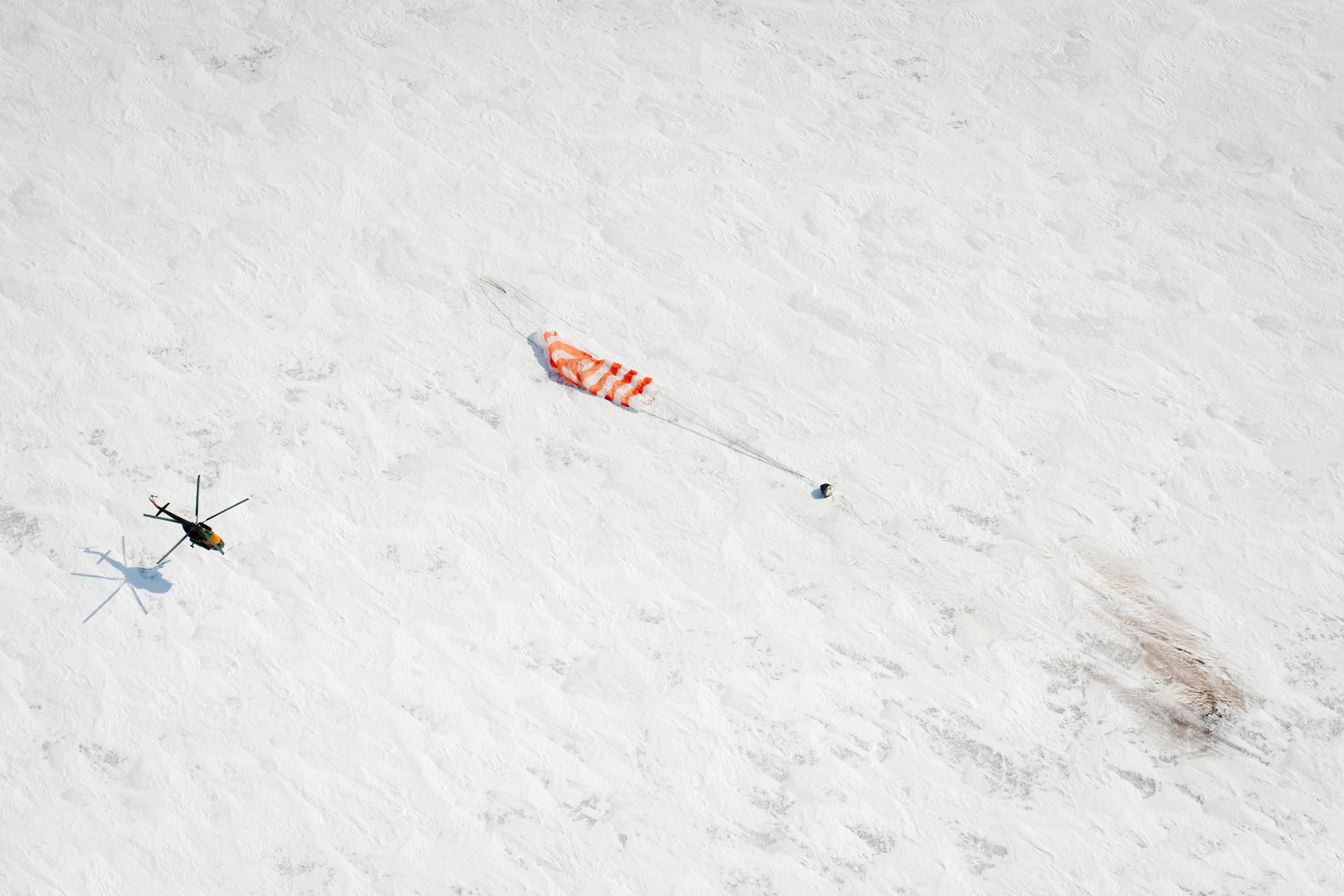
Soyuz TMA-01M lands near the town of Arkalyk in Kazakhstan.

=== Landing ===
Soyuz TMA-01M undocked from the Poisk module at 4:27 GMT on 16 March 2011. Slowing the spacecraft to begin the fall to Earth was initiated by a four-minute 17-second rocket firing starting at 7:03:17 GMT. Just before the atmospheric re-entry, the three modules making up the Soyuz TMA-01M spacecraft separated as planned. Following a nominal re-entry, the central module carrying the crew touched down on its side at 7:54 GMT near Arkalyk in north central Kazakhstan. A few minutes later, Kaleri, Kelly and Skripochka were pulled from the capsule and placed in reclining chairs.

The weather at the landing side was harsh with high winds and viciously frigid temperatures. At one point in his live landing commentary, NASA spokesman Rob Navias said "You would think that was a scene out of the North Pole," to explain the extreme climatic conditions.

== Gallery ==
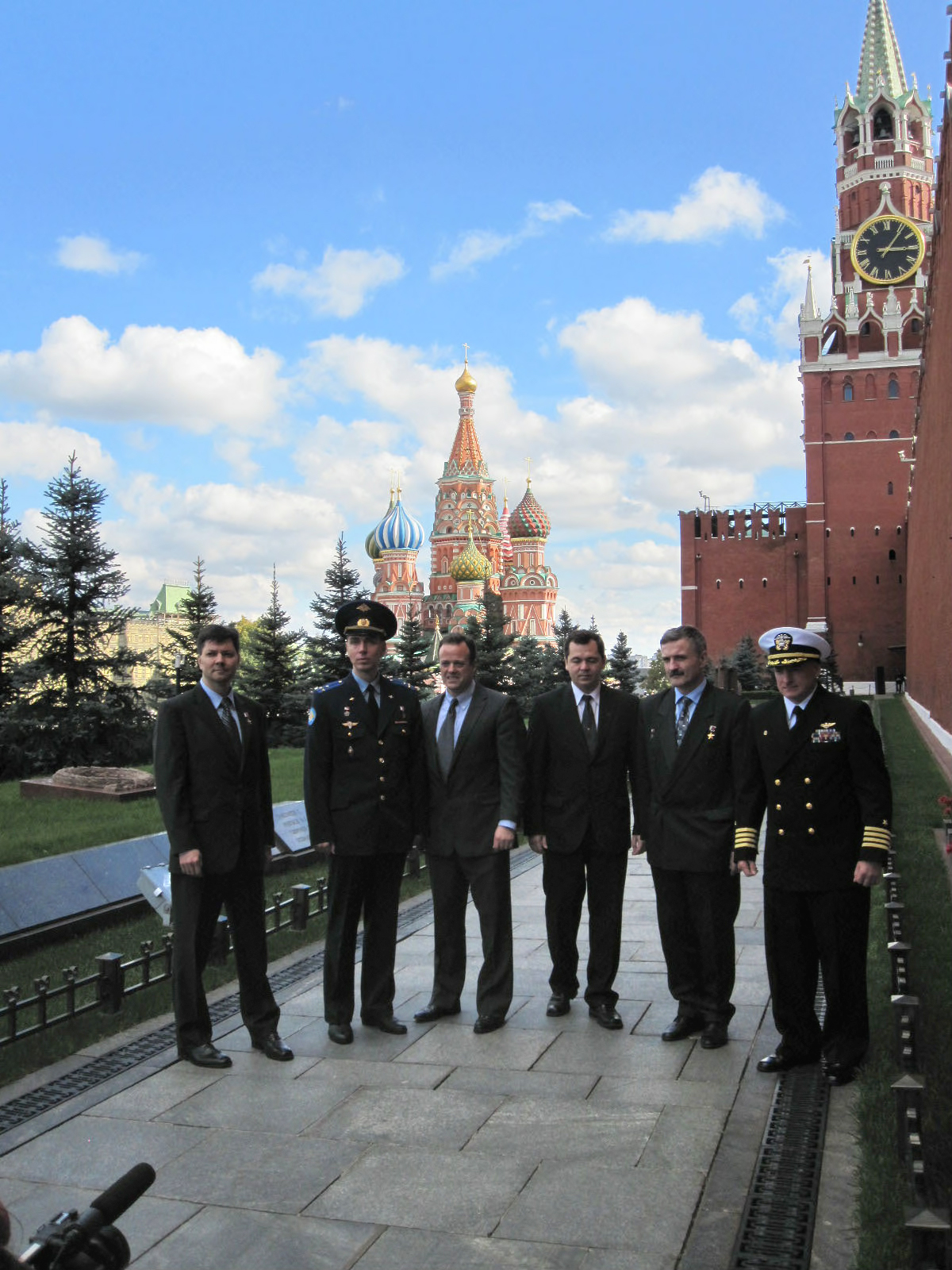
The Soyuz TMA-01M prime and backup crews conduct their ceremonial tour on 17 September 2010.

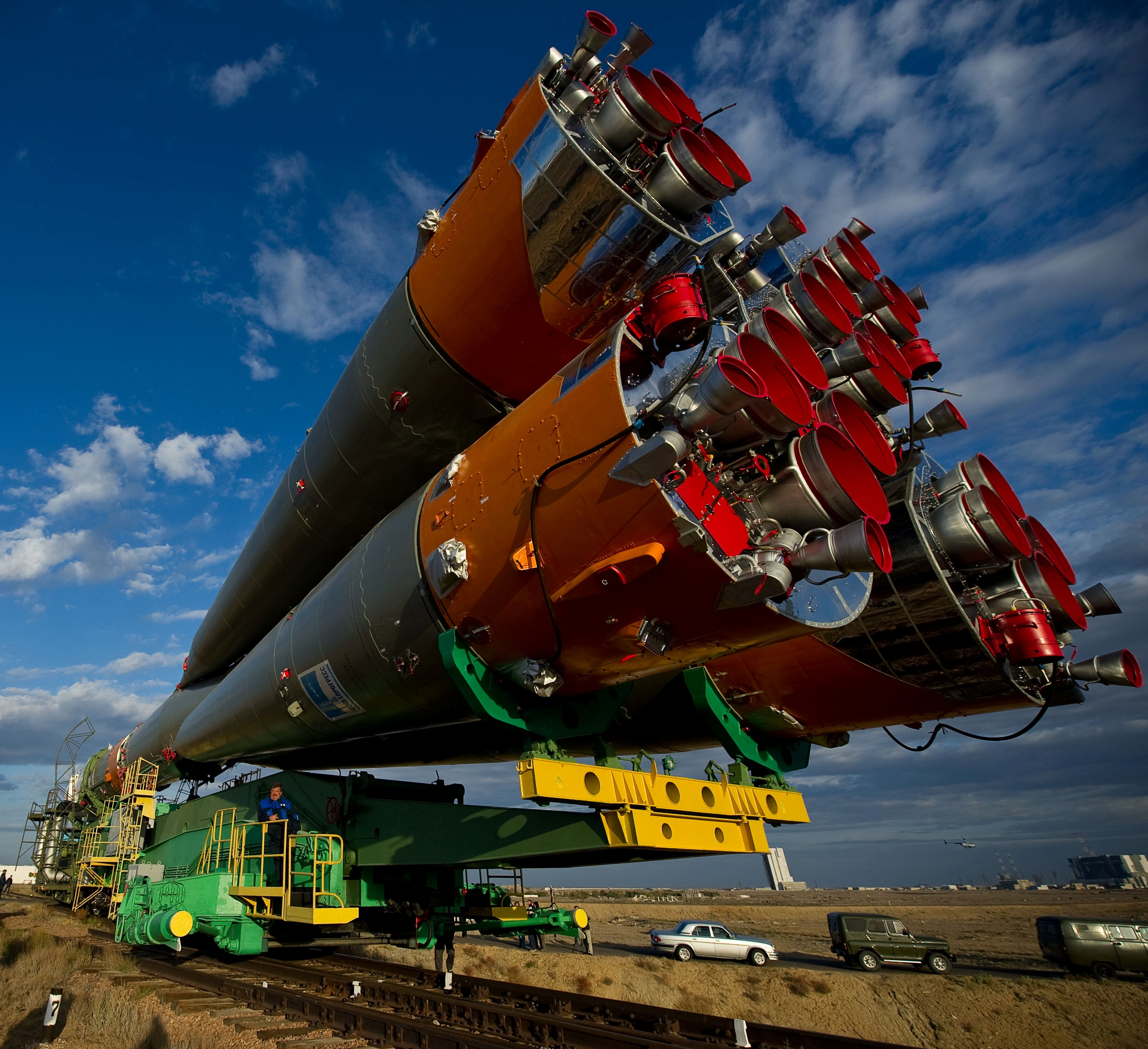
Soyuz TMA-01M, being rolled out to the launch pad at the Baikonur Cosmodrome in 2010.

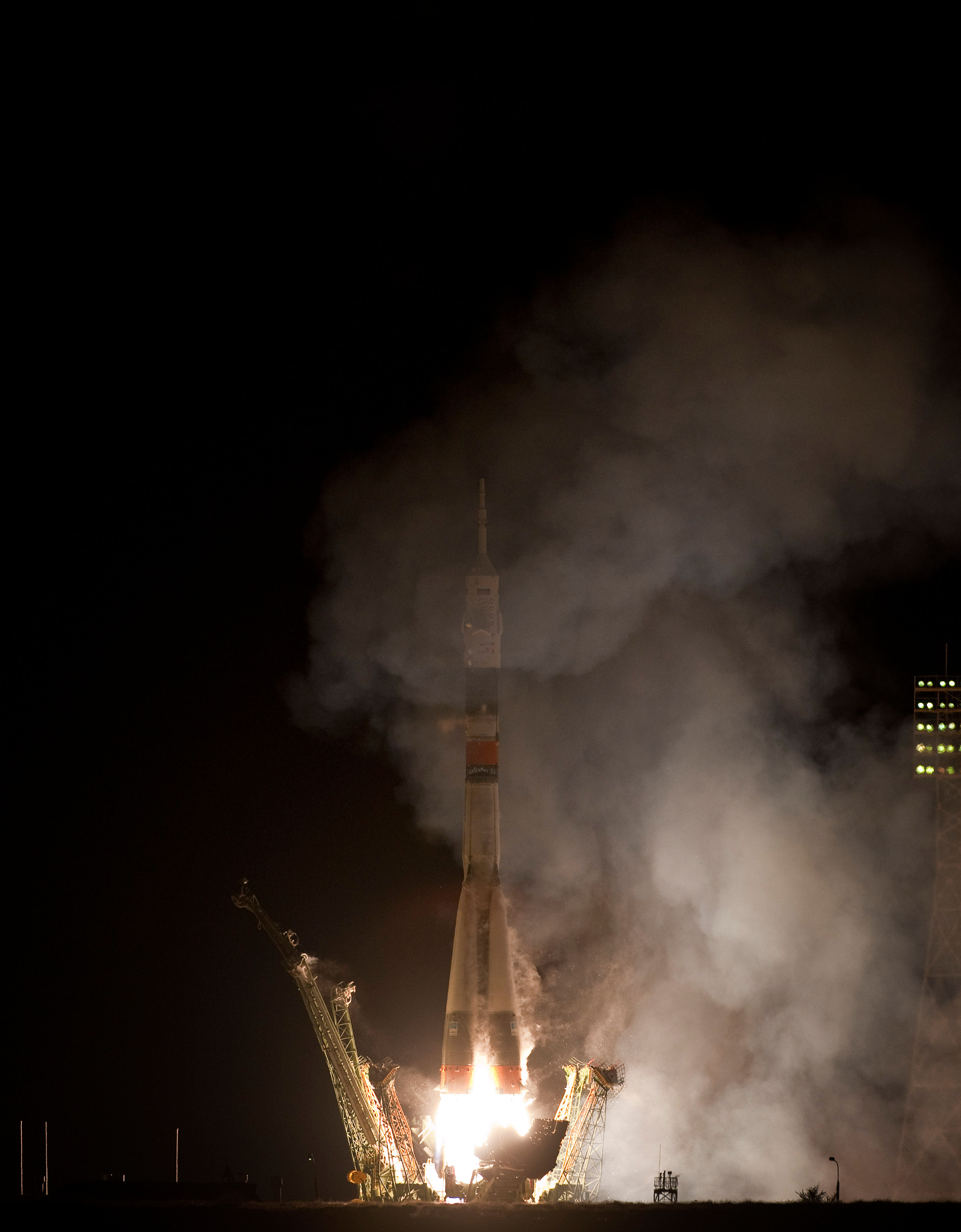
The Soyuz TMA-01M launches from the Baikonur Cosmodrome.

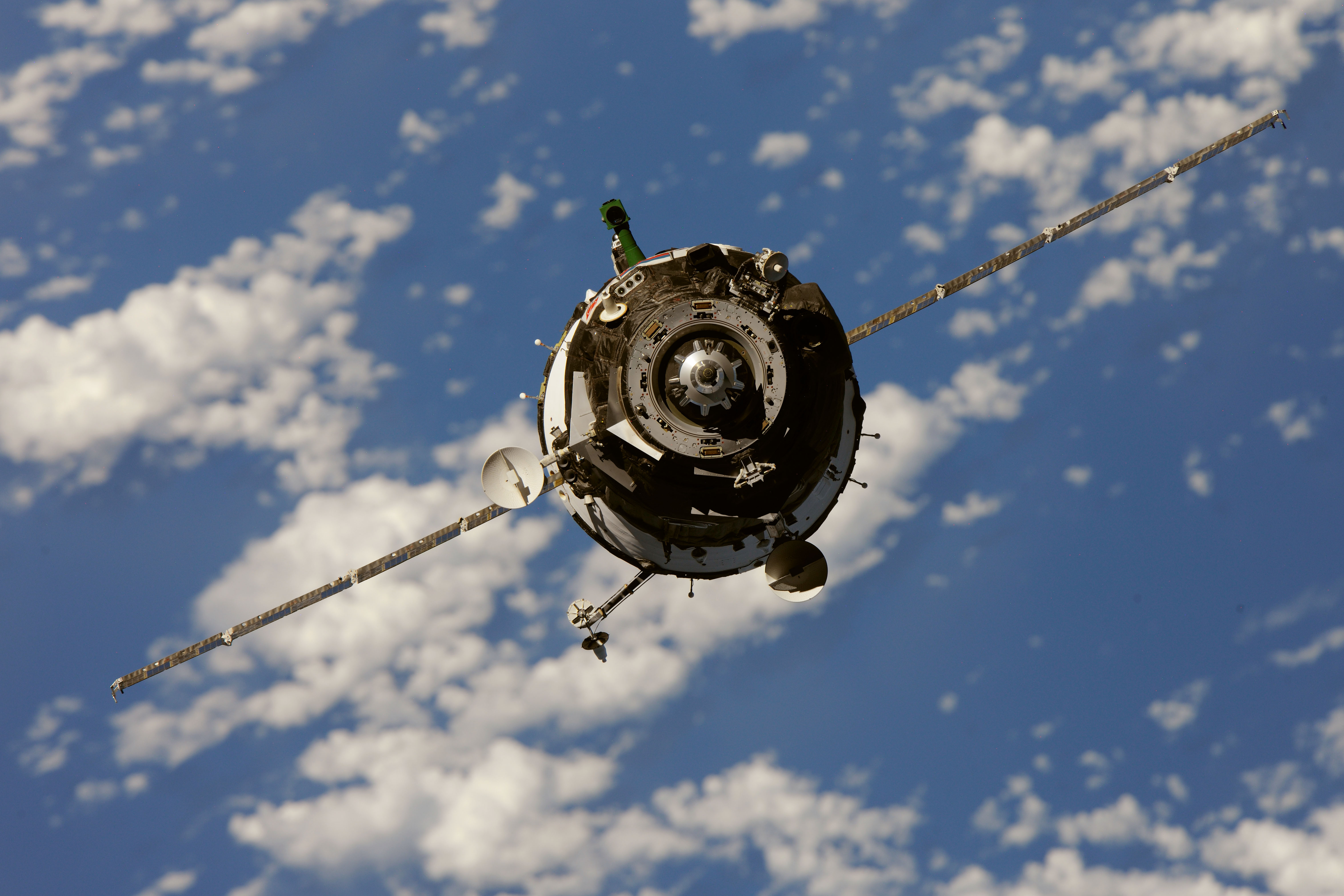
The Soyuz TMA-01M spacecraft approaches the ISS.

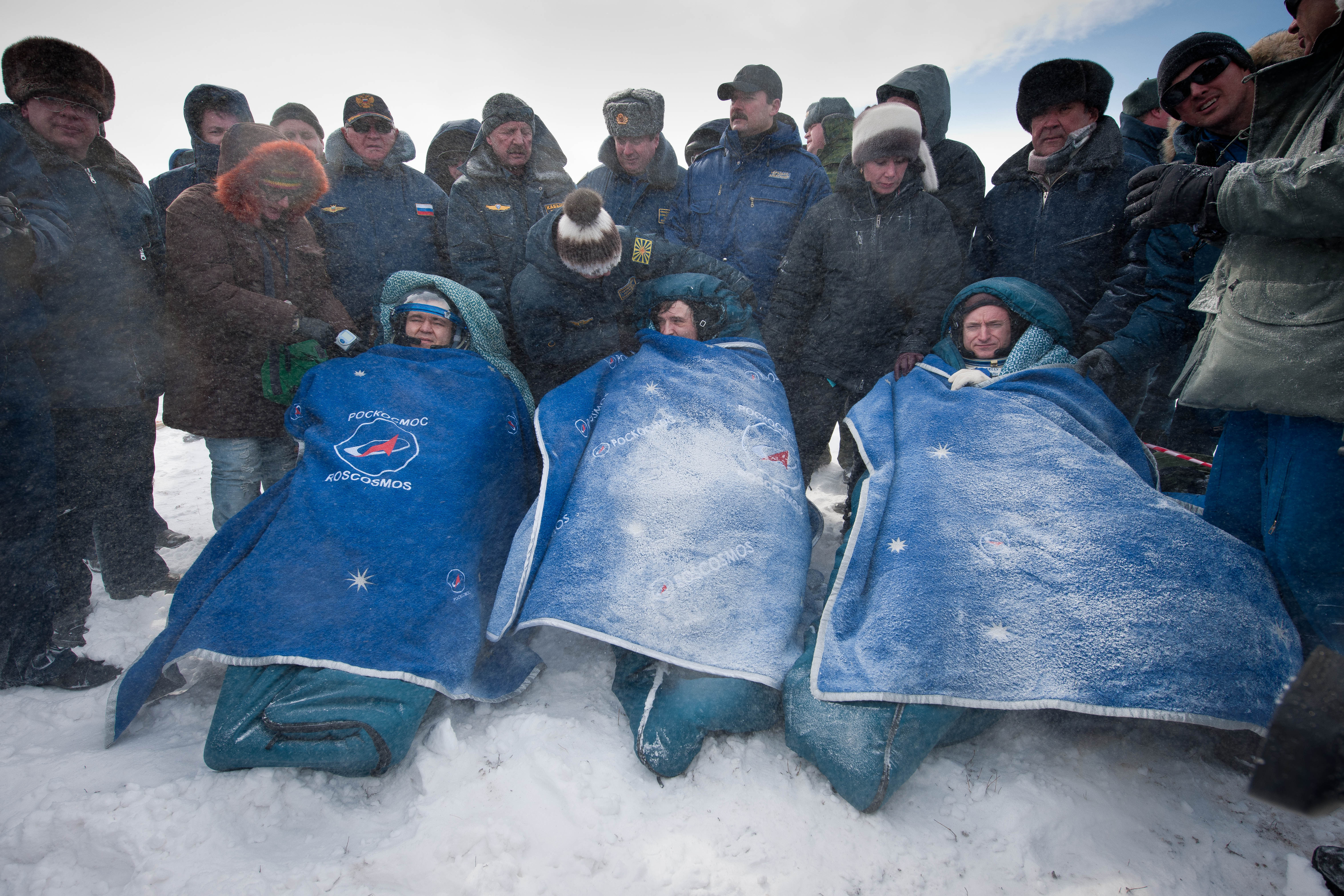
Kaleri, Skripochka and Kelly sit in chairs after they landed.
