= Progress M-08M =

Supply vehicle for the International Space Station

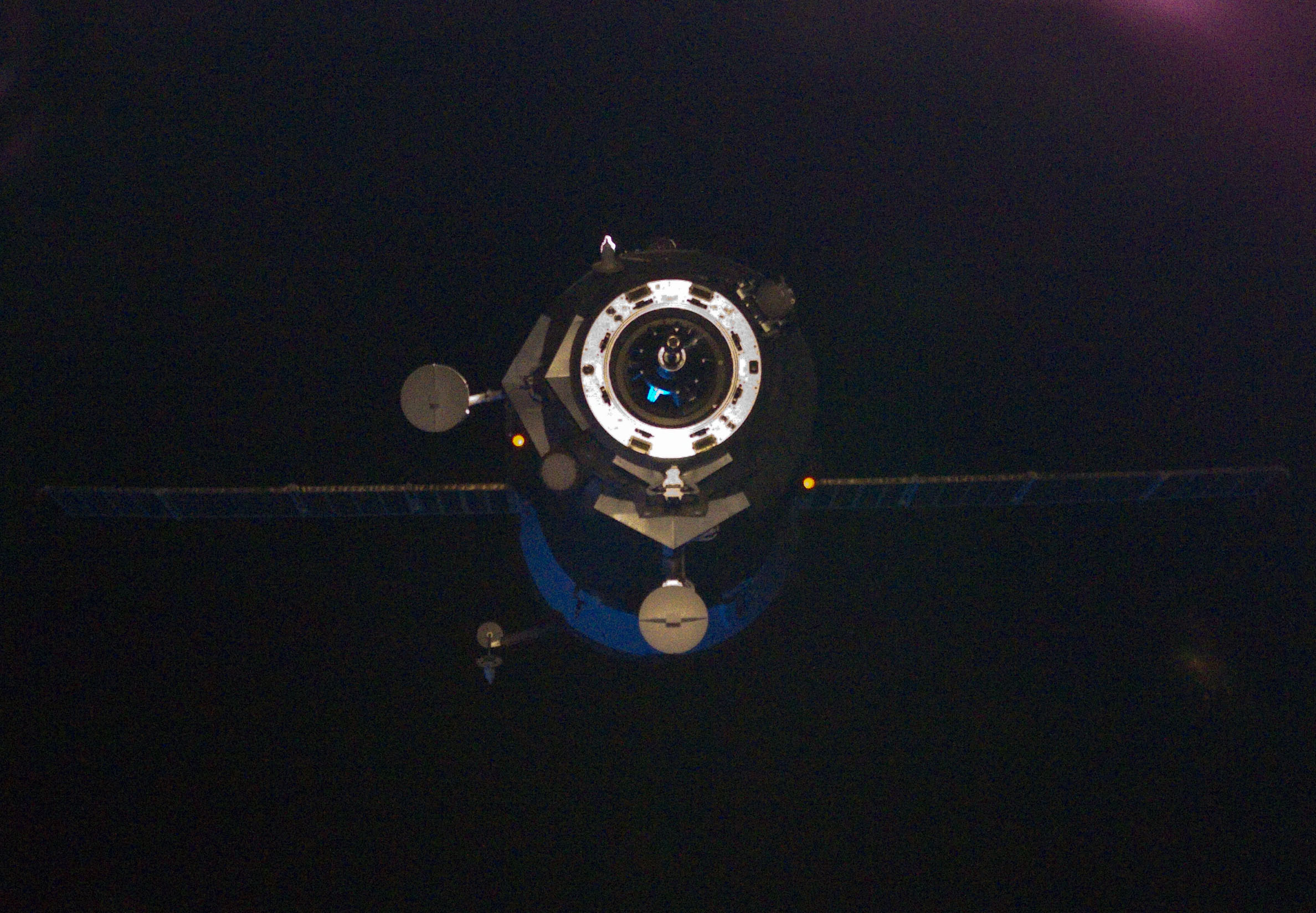
- Progress M-08M approaches the ISS on 30 October 2010.
- Mission type: ISS resupply
- Operator: Roskosmos
- COSPAR ID: 2010-055A
- SATCAT no.: 37196
- Mission duration: 91 days

Spacecraft properties
- Spacecraft type: Progress-M s/n 408
- Manufacturer: RKK Energia
- Launch mass: 7289 kg

Start of mission
- Launch date: 27 October 2010, 15:11:50 UTC
- Rocket: Soyuz-U
- Launch site: Baikonur, Site 1/5

End of mission
- Disposal: Deorbited
- Decay date: 24 January 2011, 06:07 UTC

Orbital parameters
- Reference system: Geocentric
- Regime: Low Earth
- Inclination: 51.64°
- Epoch: 27 October 2010

Docking with ISS
- Docking port: Pirs
- Docking date: 30 October 2010, 16:36 UTC
- Undocking date: 24 January 2011, 00:42 UTC
- Time docked: 88 days

Cargo
- Mass: 2572 kg
- Pressurised: 1272 kg
- Fuel: 870 kg
- Gaseous: 449 kg (oxygen)
- Water: 226 kg
- Progress ISS Resupply

Progress M-08M (Russian: Прогресс М-08М), identified by NASA as Progress 40P, is a Progress spacecraft which was used to resupply the International Space Station. It was the eighth Progress-M 11F615A60 spacecraft to be launched, the fifth for the year 2010. The spacecraft was manufactured by RKK Energia, and was operated by the Russian Federal Space Agency. It arrived at the space station on 30 October 2010 whilst the Expedition 25 crew was aboard, and departed during Expedition 26 on 24 January 2011.

== Prelaunch operations ==
Prior to the expected launch, preparations had been going for months. A train with the Soyuz-U rocket that will be used for the Progress launch arrived at Baikonur Cosmodrome on 24 July 2010. The rocket was transported to Site 112. The Progress M-08M spacecraft was delivered to the Baikonur on 3 September 2010 where it was hosted at site 254. Prelaunch processing gathered pace afterwards with tests of the Progress' RF systems in the acoustic chamber completed in late September 2010 and leak checks in the vacuum chamber in early October 2010. On 3 October 2010, Progress spacecraft was transported to hall 104 of the integration facility from the vacuum chamber. Further tests continued and potable water was loaded into Rodnik tanks of the Progress M-08M spacecraft.

On 15 October 2010, Russian Space Agency began prelaunch processing of Baikonur's pad 1, preparing it for the Progress launch. On 18 October 2010, Progress M-08M cargo vehicle was loaded with propellant components and compressed gases, and returned to the integration and test facility for further processing. With Designers' inspection of Progress M-08M completed, the spacecraft was transported to the launch vehicle integration facility for further assembly with the Soyuz-U rocket.

The combined Soyuz-U rocket and the Progress M-08M spacecraft stack was rolled out and installed in vertical at Baikonur's pad 1 during the morning of 25 October 2010. Soon afterwards, Launch minus three day (L-3) prelaunch operations commenced at the pad.

== Cargo ==
Progress M-08M hauled 2572 kg of cargo supplies including water, air, fuel and hardware for Molniya-Gamma and Coulomb Crystal experiments to the space station. The Molniya-Gamma experiment measures gamma splashes and optical radiation during terrestrial lightning and thunder conditions. The spacecraft also carried high-speed data transmission equipment to be installed on the outer surface of the space station during a spacewalk by cosmonauts Oleg Skripochka and Dmitri Kondratyev in January 2011. In addition to the standard rations, the food boxes contain fresh fruits and vegetables – lemons, apples, onions, tomatoes, and 1 kg of garlic.

=== Inventory ===
Total cargo mass delivered: 2572 kg

Item description	Mass (kg)
Propellant in the propulsion system tanks^{‡}	880
Propellant in the refueling system tanks	870
Oxygen	50
Water in the Rodnik system tanks	272
Items in the cargo compartment	1130
Gas supply system	1
Water supply system	22
On-board hardware control system	13
On-board measurement system	47
Electrical power supply system	77
Telemetry data system (BITS2-12)	1
Thermal control system	19
Lightening items	4
Power supply systems	77
Guidance, Navigation and Control system	48
Maintenance and repair equipment	21
Sanitary and hygienic items	102
Food containers, fresh products	278
Medical equipment, linen, personal hygienic and prophylactics items	91
Personal protective items	79
Anti-fire protection items	4
PCE-pointed power sensor	1
On-board documentation files, crew provisions, video- and photo-equipment	22
Zvezda Service Module hardware	2
MRM-2 hardware	5
Zarya FGB-hardware	65
US Orbital Segment hardware	324

‡ Included 250 kg of propellent for the space station needs.

== Mission timeline ==
=== Launch ===
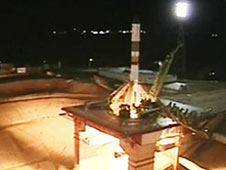
Progress M-08M launches from Baikonur's pad 1 on 27 October 2010.

On 26 October 2010, the space station performed a Debris Avoidance Maneuver (DAM) in order to get out of the way of a piece of debris from the defunct Upper Atmosphere Research Satellite (UARS). As such, at 10:25 UTC, the engines of the Progress M-07M spacecraft, were fired for three minutes in a posigrade direction. This resulted in an increase in velocity of the space station by 0.4 metres per second. As such, the launch of Progress M-08M launch was brought forward by three seconds from 15:11:53 UTC.

The Soyuz-U carrier rocket with Progress M-08M was launched from the Baikonur Cosmodrome's Pad 1 (Gagarin's launch pad) at 15:11:50 on 27 October 2010. Ascent was nominal, and all systems functioned without issues. The launch mass of the spacecraft was 7289 kg. Progress M-08M successfully achieved the preliminary orbit of (192.46 by 242.99 kilometres, inclination 51.4°, period 88.57 minutes) after a nine-minute ascent provided by the three-stage Soyuz-U rocket. In space, onboard commands were issued to unfurl the spacecraft's communications and navigation antennas and extend the two solar arrays.

=== Docking ===
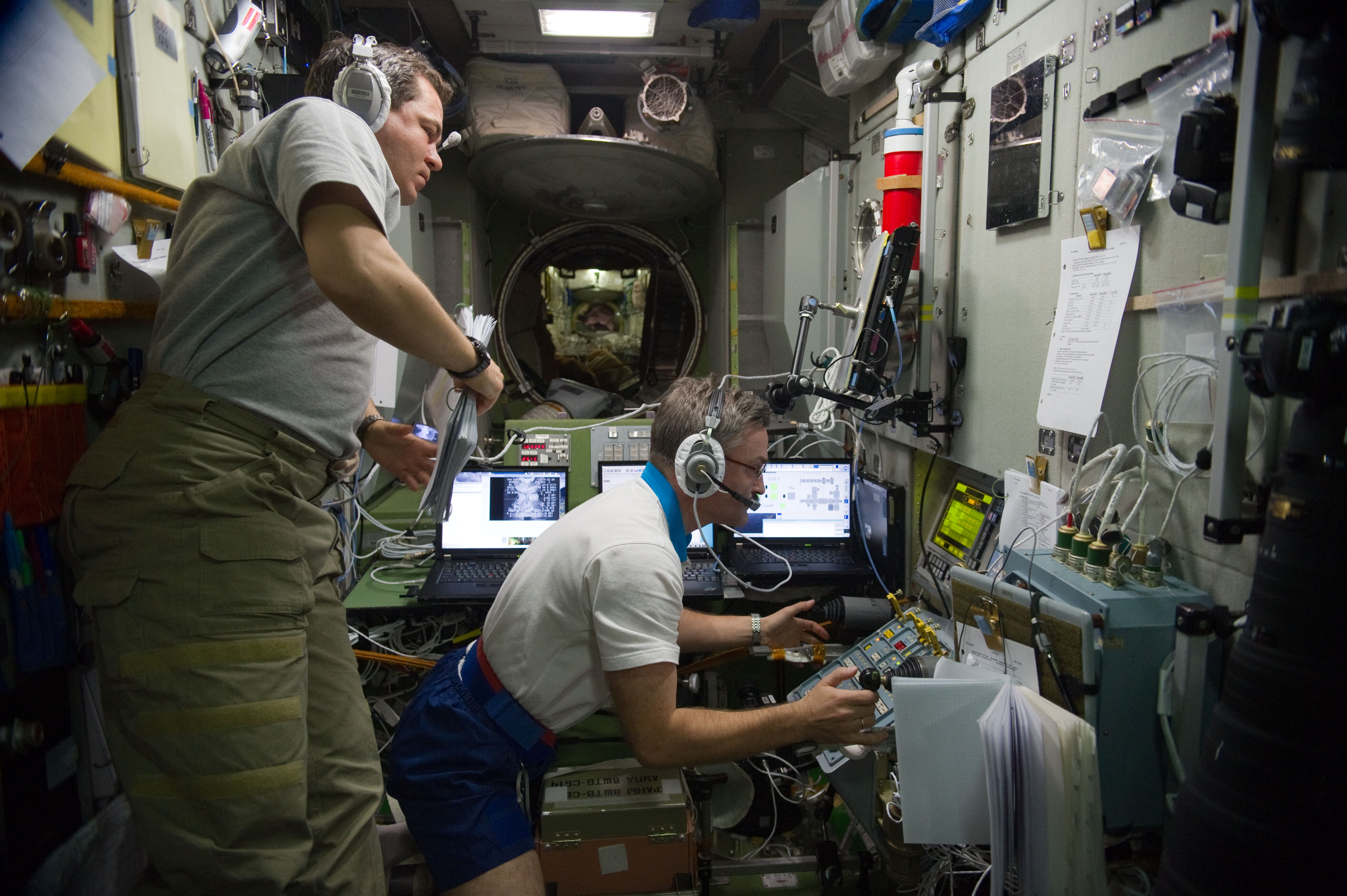
Aleksandr Kaleri (right) and Oleg Skripochka monitor data at the manual TORU docking system controls in the Zvezda Service Module.

On 30 October 2010, after three days of autonomous flight following the launch, Progress M-08M docked with the Pirs Docking Compartment Module nadir port of the space station. The successful linkup came at 16:36 UTC while flying at 350 km over western Kazakhstan. In preparation for the docking on 20 October 2010, the engines of the Progress M-07M spacecraft were fired for 228.7 seconds. This reboost placed the space station at the proper altitude to receive Progress M-08M. A late DAM performed on 26 October 2010 slightly changed the station's orientation in space and the planned docking had to be brought forward by a couple of minutes.

The Progress M-08M spacecraft, flying on autopilot, performed a flawless rendezvous with the space station. After arriving in the vicinity of the space station, Progress M-08M began a flyaround maneuver to get lined up with the docking port and then executed a roll maneuver to properly orient its solar wings with surrounding structures around the Pirs module. A brief stationkeeping hold with about 200 metre between the spacecraft and space station allowed Russian flight controllers to assess systems before giving approval to commence the final approach.

During stationkeeping, flight controllers in Moscow instructed cosmonaut Aleksandr Kaleri to activate the TORU manual docking equipment and take over the piloting tasks from the Progress' autonomous KURS system. The switch to manual mode was decided at range of 194 metre. Kaleri worked inside the space station's Zvezda module to fly Progress M-08M remotely using television views and a pair of joysticks and guided it to the successful docking. The range rate at the time of contact, based on Mission Control Center-Moscow calculations was 0.067 m/s.

Hooks and latches were engaged a few minutes later to firmly secure Progress M-08M to the space station. The Expedition 25 crew opened hatches and entered the Progress later on the next day.

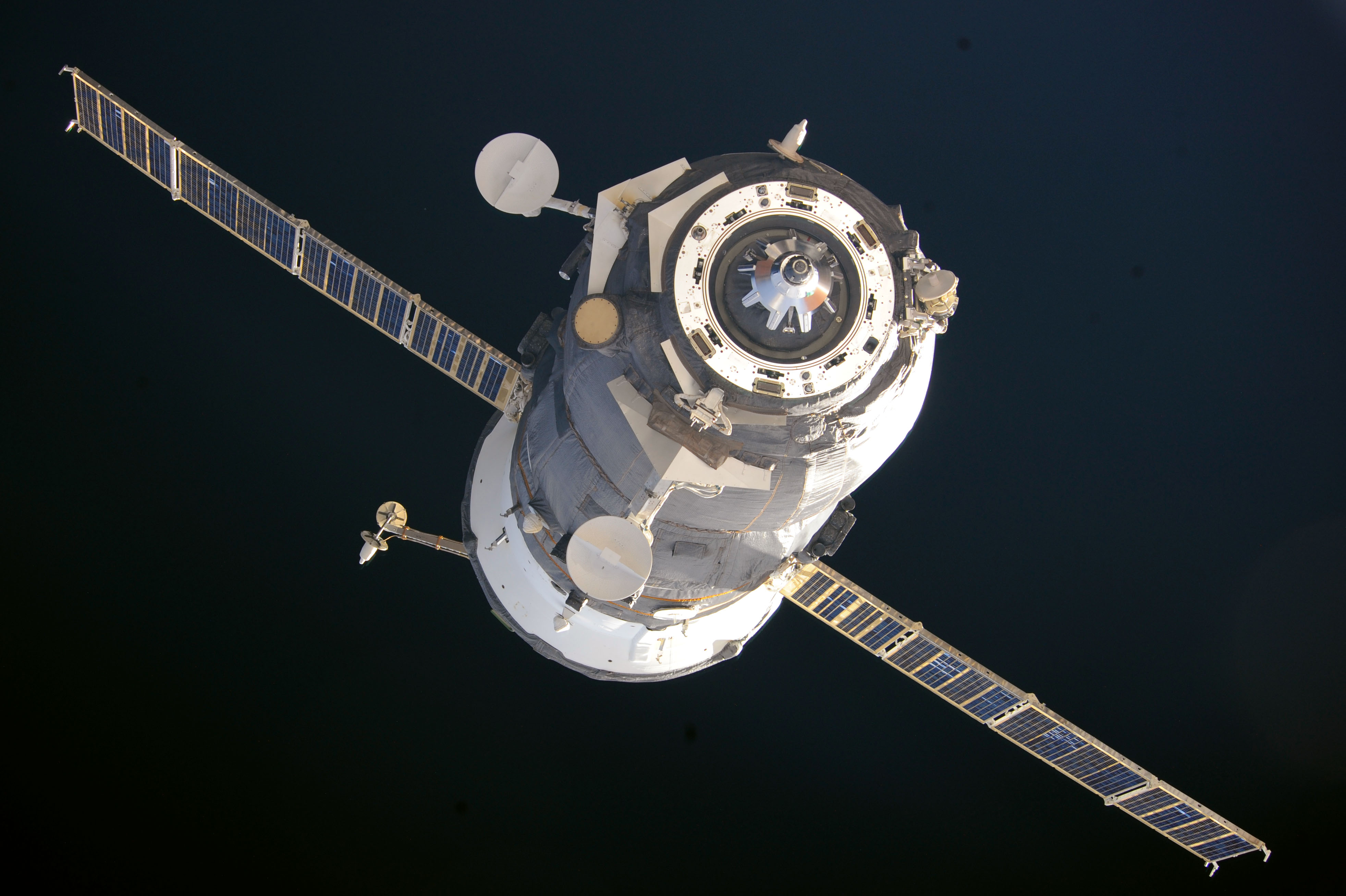
Progress M-08M seen shortly after undocking from the ISS.

=== Undocking and decay ===
Progress M-08M spacecraft undocked nominally from the International Space Station on 23 January 2011. The undocking command was issued by Russian Mission Control at 00:40 UTC. The spacecraft was not used for further scientific experiments. The deorbit burn took place at 05:16 UTC on 24 January 2011. It re-entered and fell into a remote area of the southern Pacific Ocean at 06:07 UTC.

== See also ==
- 2010 in spaceflight
- List of Progress flights
- Uncrewed spaceflights to the International Space Station
