= 2010 in spaceflight =

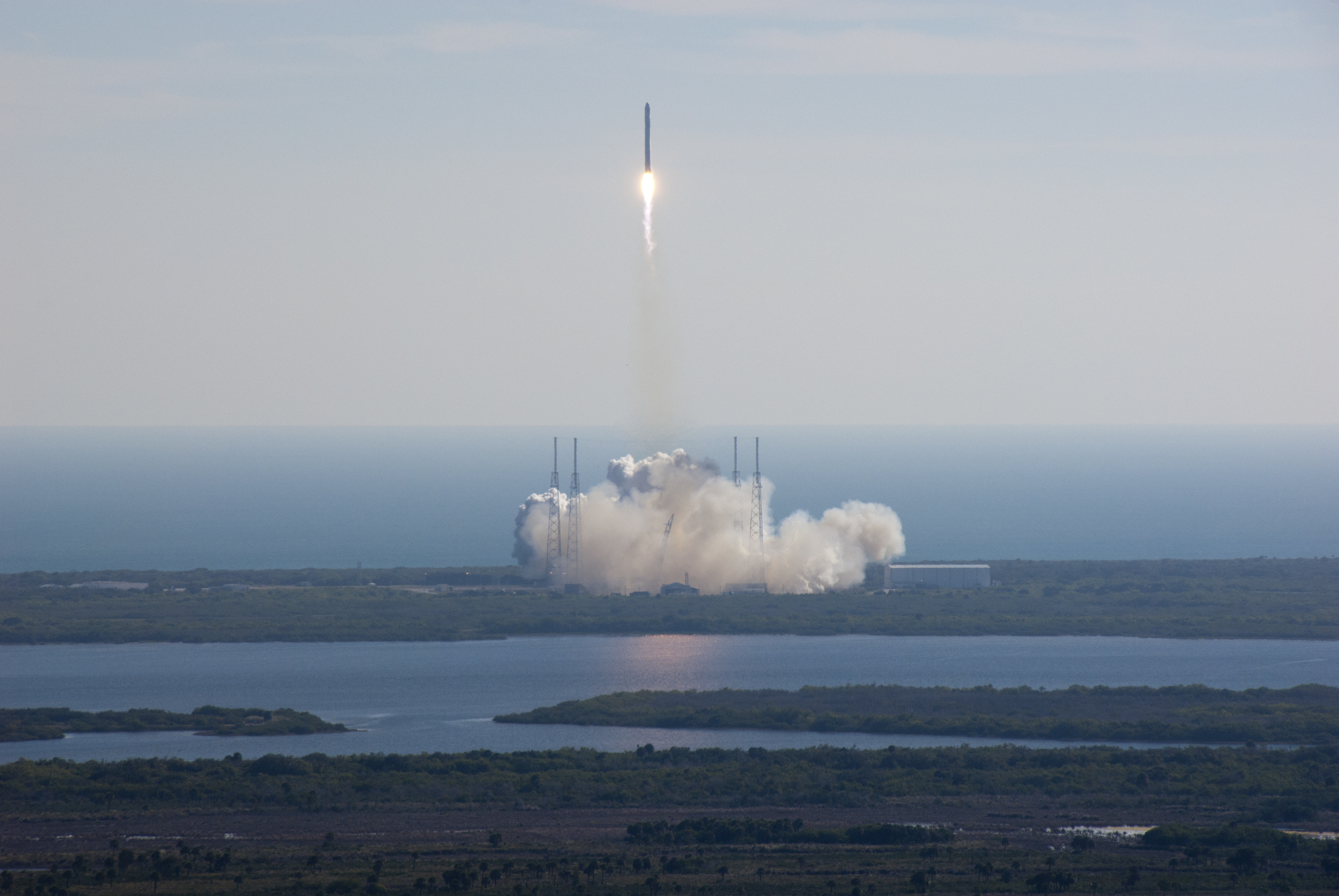
- The Dragon capsule's maiden launch aboard a Falcon 9 rocket on 8 December 2010.

Orbital launches
- First: 16 January
- Last: 29 December
- Total: 74
- Successes: 70
- Failures: 4
- Partial failures: 0
- Catalogued: 70

Rockets
- Maiden flights: Atlas V 501; Atlas V 531; Falcon 9 v1.0 GSLV Mk. II; Minotaur IV
- Retirements: Delta II 7420; Molniya-M; Kosmos-3M

Crewed flights
- Orbital: 7
- Total travellers: 31

2010 in spaceflight

The year 2010 saw a number of notable events in worldwide spaceflight activities. These included the first test flight of the SpaceX Dragon commercial resupply spacecraft, which is intended to resupply the International Space Station (ISS), and the maiden flights of the Falcon 9 and Minotaur IV rockets. In June 2010, South Korea conducted a second Naro-1 launch, after the failure of the rocket's maiden flight in 2009; however, the second attempt also failed. The Kosmos-3M was retired from service, making its final flight in April. The Molniya-M was also retired from service, making its final flight in September.

== Overview ==
The first suborbital launch of 2010 was conducted at 23:00 GMT on 10 January, when a Black Brant IX sounding rocket was launched as a target for the Boeing YAL-1 airborne-laser platform. On 11 January, China conducted an ABM test, involving two missiles. The first orbital launch occurred at 16:12 UTC on 16 January, when a Long March 3C launched the Compass-G1 navigation satellite from the Xichang Satellite Launch Centre.

Seventy-four orbital launches were attempted in 2010, with seventy being successful and four ending in failure. The last orbital launch was made on 29 December, when an Ariane 5ECA launched the Hispasat-1E and Koreasat 6 spacecraft from Guiana Space Centre, near Kourou.

== Space exploration ==
Akatsuki, the first Japanese mission to Venus, was launched on an H-IIA carrier rocket in May. It is intended to look for lightning and volcanoes on Venus. Despite a successful launch, the spacecraft failed to enter Cytherocentric orbit in December, but it managed to enter the orbit around Venus five years later in December 2015. IKAROS, the first operational solar sail, was launched on the same rocket as Akatsuki.

The first Japanese asteroid probe, Hayabusa, returned to Earth on 13 June, having landed on 25143 Itokawa in an effort to collect samples. It was also the world's first successful sample return mission from an asteroid.

On 1 October at 10:59:57 UTC, China successfully launched the Chang'e-2 spacecraft, the nation's second mission to explore the Moon. A Long March 3C rocket was used for the launch, which occurred from the Xichang Satellite Launch Centre. The spacecraft conducted a mission similar to that of the earlier Chang'e-1 spacecraft, but with a focus on mapping potential landing sites in preparation for the Chang'e-3 uncrewed lunar lander.

== Crewed spaceflight ==
Seven crewed launches were planned for 2010, with three Space Shuttle missions and four Soyuz flights for International Space Station (ISS) crew rotation. STS-130, using orbiter Endeavour, was the first crewed flight of the year, launching on 8 February with the Tranquility node and Cupola for the ISS. On 5 April, Discovery launched on mission STS-131, with the Leonardo MPLM to resupply the outpost.

Soyuz TMA-18 launched the Expedition 23 crew to the ISS on 2 April; it was scheduled to spend around six months docked to the station to facilitate crew escape in an emergency. Shortly before, Soyuz TMA-16 undocked, transporting former ISS crewmembers back to Earth. On 14 May, Space Shuttle Atlantis launched on its second-to-last flight, STS-132, carrying the Rassvet module to the ISS. Soyuz TMA-19 launched with Expedition 24 on 15 June. Soyuz TMA-01M, the first flight of a modernised Soyuz-TMA spacecraft, launched on 8 October with the Expedition 25 crew for the ISS. Then, to end the year, Expedition 26 launched aboard Soyuz TMA-20 on 15 December.

== Launch failures ==
Four orbital launch failures occurred in 2010, two affecting Geosynchronous Satellite Launch Vehicles, one affecting a Naro-1 rocket, and one affecting a Proton rocket. The first occurred on 15 April, when the GSLV Mk.II launched on its maiden flight. The rocket's third stage malfunctioned, resulting in the stage, and the GSAT-4 satellite, failing to achieve orbit and falling into the sea. The second failure occurred during the second launch of the Naro-1 rocket, carrying the STSAT-2B spacecraft. The rocket exploded 137 seconds into the flight.

The third failure occurred on 5 December, when a Proton-M with the first Blok DM-03 upper stage failed to inject three Glonass-M satellites into orbit. Before launch, the Blok DM was fuelled incorrectly, resulting in the rocket being too heavy to reach its parking orbit. The fourth failure occurred on 25 December 2010, when a GSLV Mk.I exploded during the launch of GSAT-5P. The rocket was destroyed by range safety, after control of the liquid-fuelled boosters attached to the first stage was lost.

== Orbital launches ==
- ← Jan
- Feb
- Mar
- Apr
- May
- Jun
- Jul
- Aug
- Sep
- Oct
- Nov
- Dec →

Date and time (UTC)	Rocket	Flight number	Launch site		LSP	
Date and time (UTC)	Payload (⚀ = CubeSat)	Operator	Orbit	Function	Decay (UTC)	Outcome
Date and time (UTC)	Remarks					
=== January ===
16 January; 16:12	(China) Long March 3C		(China) Xichang LC-2		(China) CNSA	
16 January; 16:12	(China) BeiDou-2 G1 (Beidou-3/Compass-G1)	CNSA	Geosynchronous	Navigation	In orbit	Operational
28 January; 00:18	(Russia) Proton-M / Briz-M Enhanced		(Kazakhstan) Baikonur Site 81/24		(Russia) Khrunichev	
28 January; 00:18	(Russia) Raduga-1M №2 (Globus-1M №12L)	VKS	Geosynchronous	Communications	In orbit	Operational
← Jan; Feb; Mar; Apr; May; Jun; Jul; Aug; Sep; Oct; Nov; Dec →; === February ===
3 February; 03:45	(Russia) Soyuz-U		(Kazakhstan) Baikonur Site 1/5		(Russia) Roscosmos	
3 February; 03:45	(Russia) Progress M-04M / 36P	Roscosmos	Low Earth (ISS)	ISS logistics	1 July; 14:40	Successful
3 February; 03:45	ISS flight 36P					
8 February; 09:14	(United States) Space Shuttle Endeavour		(United States) Kennedy LC-39A		(United States) United Space Alliance	
8 February; 09:14	(United States) STS-130	NASA	Low Earth (ISS)	ISS assembly	22 February; 03:22	Successful
8 February; 09:14	(United Nations) Tranquility	NASA	Low Earth (ISS)	ISS assembly	In orbit	Operational
8 February; 09:14	(United Nations) Cupola	NASA	Low Earth (ISS)	ISS assembly	In orbit	Operational
8 February; 09:14	Crewed flight with six astronauts.					
11 February; 15:23	(United States) Atlas V 401		(United States) Cape Canaveral SLC-41		(United States) United Launch Alliance	
11 February; 15:23	(United States) Solar Dynamics Observatory	NASA	Geosynchronous	Heliophysics	In orbit	Operational
12 February; 00:39	(Russia) Proton-M / Briz-M Enhanced		(Kazakhstan) Baikonur Site 200/39		(Russia) (United States) International Launch Services	
12 February; 00:39	(United Nations) Intelsat 16	Intelsat	Geosynchronous	Communications	In orbit	Operational
← Jan; Feb; Mar; Apr; May; Jun; Jul; Aug; Sep; Oct; Nov; Dec →; === March ===
1 March; 21:19	(Russia) Proton-M / DM-2 Enhanced		(Kazakhstan) Baikonur Site 81/24		(Russia) Khrunichev	
1 March; 21:19	(Russia) Kosmos 2459 (Glonass-M 731)	VKS	Medium Earth	Navigation	In orbit	Operational
1 March; 21:19	(Russia) Kosmos 2460 (Glonass-M 732)	VKS	Medium Earth	Navigation	In orbit	Operational
1 March; 21:19	(Russia) Kosmos 2461 (Glonass-M 735)	VKS	Medium Earth	Navigation	In orbit	Operational
4 March; 23:57	(United States) Delta IV-M+ (4,2)		(United States) Cape Canaveral SLC-37B		(United States) United Launch Alliance	
4 March; 23:57	(United States) GOES-P (GOES-15)	NOAA / NASA	Geosynchronous	Meteorology	In orbit	Operational
4 March; 23:57	Satellite redesignated EWS-G2 after being transferred to the U.S. Space Force in September 2023.					
5 March; 04:55	(China) Long March 4C		(China) Jiuquan SLS-2		(China) CNSA	
5 March; 04:55	(China) Yaogan 9A	CNSA	Low Earth (SSO)	ELINT	In orbit	Operational
5 March; 04:55	(China) Yaogan 9B	CNSA	Low Earth (SSO)	ELINT	In orbit	Operational
5 March; 04:55	(China) Yaogan 9C	CNSA	Low Earth (SSO)	ELINT	In orbit	Operational
5 March; 04:55	First Long March 4 series launch from Jiuquan.					
20 March; 18:27	(Russia) Proton-M / Briz-M Enhanced		(Kazakhstan) Baikonur Site 200/39		(Russia) (United States) International Launch Services	
20 March; 18:27	(United States) Echostar XIV	Echostar	Geosynchronous	Communications	In orbit	Operational
← Jan; Feb; Mar; Apr; May; Jun; Jul; Aug; Sep; Oct; Nov; Dec →; === April ===
2 April; 04:04	(Russia) Soyuz-FG		(Kazakhstan) Baikonur Site 1/5		(Russia) Roscosmos	
2 April; 04:04	(Russia) Soyuz TMA-18	Roscosmos	Low Earth (ISS)	Expedition 23	25 September; 05:23	Successful
2 April; 04:04	Crewed flight with three cosmonauts.					
5 April; 10:21	(United States) Space Shuttle Discovery		(United States) Kennedy LC-39A		(United States) United Space Alliance	
5 April; 10:21	(United States) STS-131	NASA	Low Earth (ISS)	ISS logistics	20 April; 13:08:35	Successful
5 April; 10:21	(Italy) (United States) Leonardo MPLM	ASI / NASA	Low Earth (ISS)	ISS logistics	20 April; 13:08:35	Successful
5 April; 10:21	Crewed flight with seven astronauts.					
8 April; 13:57	(Ukraine) Dnepr		(Kazakhstan) Baikonur Site 109/95		(Russia) ISC Kosmotras	
8 April; 13:57	Cryosat-2	ESA	Low Earth	Climatology	In orbit	Operational
15 April; 10:57	(India) GSLV Mk II		(India) Satish Dhawan SLP		(India) ISRO	
15 April; 10:57	(India) GSAT-4 (HealthSat)	ISRO	Intended: Geosynchronous	Communications; Navigation	15 April	Launch failure
15 April; 10:57	Maiden flight of GSLV Mk. II, third stage failure.					
16 April; 15:00	(Russia) Soyuz-U		(Russia) Plesetsk Site 16/2		(Russia) VKS	
16 April; 15:00	(Russia) Kosmos 2462 (Yantar-4K2M №6/Kobalt-M №6)	VKS	Low Earth	Reconnaissance	21 July	Successful
22 April; 23:52	(United States) Atlas V 501		(United States) Cape Canaveral SLC-41		(United States) United Launch Alliance	
22 April; 23:52	(United States) USA-212 (X-37B OTV-1)	U.S. Air Force	Low Earth	Technology demonstration	3 December; 09:16	Successful
22 April; 23:52	Maiden flight of Atlas V 501 and Boeing X-37B.					
24 April; 11:19	(Russia) Proton-M / Briz-M Enhanced		(Kazakhstan) Baikonur Site 200/39		(Russia) (United States) International Launch Services	
24 April; 11:19	(Netherlands) SES-1 (OS-1)	SES World Skies	Geosynchronous	Communications	In orbit	Operational
27 April; 01:05	(Russia) Kosmos-3M		(Russia) Plesetsk Site 132/1		(Russia) VKS	
27 April; 01:05	(Russia) Kosmos 2463 (Parus)	VKS	Low Earth	Navigation; Communications	In orbit	Operational
27 April; 01:05	Final flight of Kosmos-3M.					
28 April; 17:15	(Russia) Soyuz-U		(Kazakhstan) Baikonur Site 1/5		(Russia) Roscosmos	
28 April; 17:15	(Russia) Progress M-05M / 37P	Roscosmos	Low Earth (ISS)	ISS logistics	15 November; 09:35:39	Successful
28 April; 17:15	ISS flight 37P					
← Jan; Feb; Mar; Apr; May; Jun; Jul; Aug; Sep; Oct; Nov; Dec →; === May ===
14 May; 18:20	(United States) Space Shuttle Atlantis		(United States) Kennedy LC-39A		(United States) United Space Alliance	
14 May; 18:20	(United States) STS-132	NASA	Low Earth (ISS)	ISS logistics	26 May; 12:48:11	Successful
14 May; 18:20	(United Nations) Rassvet (MRM-1)	Roscosmos	Low Earth (ISS)	ISS assembly	In orbit	Operational
14 May; 18:20	Crewed flight with six astronauts. Rassvet was launched along with the MLM outfittings that included a spare elbow joint for the European Robotic Arm (ERA) (which was launched with Nauka) and an ERA-portable workpost used during EVAs, as well as a heat radiator, internal hardware and an experiment airlock for launching CubeSats to be positioned on the modified passive forward port near the nadir end of the Nauka module.					
20 May; 21:58:22	(Japan) H-IIA 202		(Japan) Tanegashima LA-Y1		(Japan) MHI	
20 May; 21:58:22	(Japan) Akatsuki (Planet-C)	JAXA	Intended: Cytherocentric; Actual: Heliocentric, corrected to Cytherocentric	Venus orbiter	In orbit	Partial spacecraft failure
20 May; 21:58:22	(Japan) IKAROS	JAXA	Heliocentric	Solar sail	In orbit	Successful
20 May; 21:58:22	⚀ (Japan) Waseda-SAT2	Waseda	Low Earth	Earth observation	15 August	Spacecraft failure
20 May; 21:58:22	⚀ (Japan) Hayato (K-Sat)	Kagoshima	Low Earth	Earth observation	28 June – 14 July	Partial spacecraft failure
20 May; 21:58:22	⚀ (Japan) Negai☆''	Soka	Low Earth	Technology demonstration	26 June	Successful
20 May; 21:58:22	(Japan) Shin'en (UNITEC-1)	UNISEC	Heliocentric	Technology demonstration	In orbit	Spacecraft failure
20 May; 21:58:22	(Japan) DCAM-1	JAXA	Heliocentric	Technology demonstration	In orbit	Successful
20 May; 21:58:22	(Japan) DCAM-2	JAXA	Heliocentric	Technology demonstration	In orbit	Successful
20 May; 21:58:22	Waseda-SAT2 never contacted ground, Hayato affected by communications problems, contact lost with Shin'en on 21 May, unclear if data has been received since. DCAM spacecraft deployed from IKAROS and used to observe deployment of the solar sail. Akatsuki malfunctioned during Cytherocentric orbit insertion, and failed to enter orbit. It managed to orbit around Venus five years later.					
21 May; 22:01	(France) Ariane 5 ECA		(France) Kourou ELA-3		(France) Arianespace	
21 May; 22:01	(Luxembourg) Astra 3B	SES Astra	Geosynchronous	Communications	In orbit	Operational
21 May; 22:01	(Germany) COMSATBw-2	Bundeswehr	Geosynchronous	Communications	In orbit	Operational
28 May; 03:00	(United States) Delta IV-M+ (4,2)		(United States) Cape Canaveral SLC-37B		(United States) United Launch Alliance	
28 May; 03:00	(United States) USA-213 (GPS IIF SV-1)	U.S. Air Force	Medium Earth	Navigation	In orbit	Operational
28 May; 03:00	Named after Star Polaris.					
← Jan; Feb; Mar; Apr; May; Jun; Jul; Aug; Sep; Oct; Nov; Dec →; === June ===
2 June; 01:59	(Russia) Rokot / Briz-KM		(Russia) Plesetsk Site 133/3		rocket= (France) (Russia) Eurockot	
2 June; 01:59	(Japan) SERVIS-2	USEF	Low Earth (SSO)	Technology demonstration	In orbit	Operational
2 June; 15:53:04	(China) Long March 3C		(China) Xichang LC-2		(China) CNSA	
2 June; 15:53:04	(China) Compass-G3	CNSA	Geosynchronous	Navigation	In orbit	Operational
3 June; 22:00:08	(Russia) Proton-M / Briz-M Enhanced		(Kazakhstan) Baikonur Site 200/39		(Russia) (United States) International Launch Services	
3 June; 22:00:08	(Saudi Arabia) Badr-5	ARABSAT	Geosynchronous	Communications	In orbit	Operational
4 June; 18:45	(United States) Falcon 9 v1.0		(United States) Cape Canaveral SLC-40		(United States) SpaceX	
4 June; 18:45	(United States) DSQU	SpaceX	Low Earth	Boilerplate	27 June; 00:50	Successful
4 June; 18:45	Maiden flight of Falcon 9.					
10 June; 08:01	(Russia) (South Korea) Naro-1		(South Korea) Naro LC-1		(Russia) (South Korea) Khrunichev / KARI	
10 June; 08:01	(South Korea) STSAT-2B	KARI	Intended: Low Earth	Technology demonstration	+137 seconds	Launch failure
10 June; 08:01	Exploded during first stage burn.					
15 June; 01:39	(China) Long March 2D		(China) Jiuquan SLS-2		(China) CNSA	
15 June; 01:39	(China) Shijian 12	CNSA	Low Earth (SSO)	Technology demonstration	In orbit	Operational
15 June; 14:42	(Ukraine) Dnepr		(Russia) Dombarovsky Site 13		(Russia) ISC Kosmotras	
15 June; 14:42	(Sweden) Prisma-Mango	SSC	Low Earth (SSO)	Technology demonstration	In orbit	Operational
15 June; 14:42	(Sweden) Prisma-Tango	SSC	Low Earth (SSO)	Technology demonstration	In orbit	Operational
15 June; 14:42	(France) Picard	CNES	Low Earth (SSO)	Helioseismology	In orbit	Operational
15 June; 14:42	(Ukraine) BPA-1	Hartron-Arkos	Low Earth (SSO)	Technology demonstration	In orbit	Operational
15 June; 14:42	BPA-1 intentionally remained attached to upper stage.					
15 June; 21:35	(Russia) Soyuz-FG		(Kazakhstan) Baikonur Site 1/5		(Russia) Roscosmos	
15 June; 21:35	(Russia) Soyuz TMA-19	Roscosmos	Low Earth (ISS)	Expedition 24	26 November; 04:46:53	Successful
15 June; 21:35	Crewed flight with three cosmonauts					
21 June; 02:14	(Ukraine) Dnepr		(Kazakhstan) Baikonur Site 109/95		(Russia) ISC Kosmotras	
21 June; 02:14	(Germany) TanDEM-X	DLR	Low Earth (SSO)	Earth observation	In orbit	Operational
22 June; 19:00	(Israel) Shavit-2		(Israel) Palmachim		Israel Aerospace Industries	
22 June; 19:00	(Israel) Ofek-9	IAI / Israel Defense Forces	Low Earth (retrograde)	Reconnaissance	In orbit	Operational
22 June; 19:00	Known as Ofek-8 before launch.					
26 June; 21:41	(France) Ariane 5 ECA		(France) Kourou ELA-3		(France) Arianespace	
26 June; 21:41	(Saudi Arabia) ArabSat-5A	ARABSAT	Geosynchronous	Communications	In orbit	Operational
26 June; 21:41	(South Korea) Chollian (COMS-1)	KARI	Geosynchronous	Communications; Meteorology; Oceanography	In orbit	Successful
30 June; 15:35	(Russia) Soyuz-U		(Kazakhstan) Baikonur Site 1/5		(Russia) Roscosmos	
30 June; 15:35	(Russia) Progress M-06M / 38P	Roscosmos	Low Earth (ISS)	ISS logistics	6 September; 12:53:20	Successful
30 June; 15:35	ISS flight 38P					
← Jan; Feb; Mar; Apr; May; Jun; Jul; Aug; Sep; Oct; Nov; Dec →; === July ===
10 July; 18:40	(Russia) Proton-M / Briz-M Enhanced		(Kazakhstan) Baikonur Site 200/39		(Russia) (United States) International Launch Services	
10 July; 18:40	(United States) EchoStar XV	Echostar	Geosynchronous	Communications	In orbit	Operational
12 July; 03:53	(India) PSLV-CA		(India) Satish Dhawan FLP		(India) ISRO	
12 July; 03:53	(India) Cartosat-2B	ISRO	Low Earth (SSO)	Earth observation	In orbit	Operational
12 July; 03:53	(Algeria) AlSat-2A	ASAL	Low Earth (SSO)	Earth observation	In orbit	Operational
12 July; 03:53	⚀ (India) StudSat	StudSat	Low Earth (SSO)	Technology demonstration	In orbit	Operational
12 July; 03:53	(Norway) AISSat-1	NDRE	Low Earth (SSO)	Technology demonstration	In orbit	Operational
12 July; 03:53	⚀ (Switzerland) TIsat-1	SUPSI	Low Earth (SSO)	Technology demonstration	In orbit	Operational
12 July; 03:53	AISSat and TIsat cubeSats to be launched as NLS-6, coordinated by UTIAS					
31 July; 21:30	(China) Long March 3A		(China) Xichang LC-3		(China) CNSA	
31 July; 21:30	(China) Compass IGSO-1	CNSA	IGSO	Navigation	In orbit	Operational
← Jan; Feb; Mar; Apr; May; Jun; Jul; Aug; Sep; Oct; Nov; Dec →; === August ===
4 August; 20:59	(France) Ariane 5 ECA		(France) Kourou ELA-3		(France) Arianespace	
4 August; 20:59	(Egypt) Nilesat-201	Nilesat	Geosynchronous	Communications	In orbit	Operational
4 August; 20:59	(Mauritius) RASCOM-QAF 1R	RASCOM-QAF	Geosynchronous	Communications	In orbit	Operational
9 August; 22:49	(China) Long March 4C		(China) Taiyuan LC-2		(China) CNSA	
9 August; 22:49	(China) Yaogan 10	CNSA	Low Earth (SSO)	Reconnaissance	In orbit	Operational
14 August; 11:07	(United States) Atlas V 531		(United States) Cape Canaveral SLC-41		(United States) United Launch Alliance	
14 August; 11:07	(United States) USA-214 (AEHF-1)	U.S. Air Force	Intended: Geosynchronous; Actual: GTO	Communications	In orbit	Partial spacecraft failure Operational
14 August; 11:07	Maiden flight of Atlas V 531; liquid apogee engine failed to operate during orbital insertion process.					
24 August; 07:10	(China) Long March 2D		(China) Jiuquan SLS-2		(China) CNSA	
24 August; 07:10	(China) Tian Hui 1	CNSA	Low Earth (SSO)	Earth observation	In orbit	Operational
← Jan; Feb; Mar; Apr; May; Jun; Jul; Aug; Sep; Oct; Nov; Dec →; === September ===
2 September; 00:53:43	(Russia) Proton-M / DM-2 Enhanced		(Kazakhstan) Baikonur Site 81/24		(Russia) Roscosmos	
2 September; 00:53:43	(Russia) Kosmos 2464 (Glonass-M 736)	VKS	Medium Earth	Navigation	In orbit	Operational
2 September; 00:53:43	(Russia) Kosmos 2465 (Glonass-M 737)	VKS	Medium Earth	Navigation	In orbit	Operational
2 September; 00:53:43	(Russia) Kosmos 2466 (Glonass-M 738)	VKS	Medium Earth	Navigation	In orbit	Operational
4 September; 16:14	(China) Long March 3B		(China) Xichang LC-2		(China) CNSA	
4 September; 16:14	(China) Chinasat-6A	Sinosat	Geosynchronous	Communications	In orbit	Operational
8 September; 03:30	(Russia) Rokot / Briz-KM		(Russia) Plesetsk Site 133/3		(Russia) RVSN RF	
8 September; 03:30	(Russia) Gonets-M No.2	Gonets Satellite System	Low Earth	Communications	In orbit	Operational
8 September; 03:30	(Russia) Kosmos 2467 (Strela-3)	VKS	Low Earth	Communications	In orbit	Operational
8 September; 03:30	(Russia) Kosmos 2468 (Strela-3)	VKS	Low Earth	Communications	In orbit	Operational
10 September; 10:22	(Russia) Soyuz-U		(Kazakhstan) Baikonur Site 31/6		(Russia) Roscosmos	
10 September; 10:22	(Russia) Progress M-07M / 39P	Roscosmos	Low Earth (ISS)	ISS logistics	20 February 2011; 16:12	Successful
10 September; 10:22	ISS flight 39P					
11 September; 11:17	(Japan) H-IIA 202		(Japan) Tanegashima LA-Y1		(Japan) MHI	
11 September; 11:17	(Japan) QZSS-1 (Michibiki)	JAXA	Tundra	Navigation	In orbit	Successful
21 September; 04:03:30	(United States) Atlas V 501		(United States) Vandenberg SLC-3E		(United States) United Launch Alliance	
21 September; 04:03:30	(United States) USA-215	NRO	Low Earth (retrograde)		In orbit	Operational
21 September; 04:03:30	NRO Launch 41					
22 September; 02:42	(China) Long March 2D		(China) Jiuquan SLS-2		(China) CNSA	
22 September; 02:42	(China) Yaogan 11	CNSA	Low Earth (SSO)	Reconnaissance	In orbit	Operational
22 September; 02:42	(China) Zheda Pixing 1B	CNSA	Low Earth (SSO)	Technology demonstration	In orbit	Operational
22 September; 02:42	(China) Zheda Pixing 1C	CNSA	Low Earth (SSO)	Technology demonstration	In orbit	Operational
26 September; 04:41	(United States) Minotaur IV		(United States) Vandenberg SLC-8		(United States) Orbital Sciences	
26 September; 04:41	(United States) USA-216 (SBSS)	U.S. Air Force	Low Earth (SSO)	Technology demonstration Space surveillance	In orbit	Operational
26 September; 04:41	First orbital launch of Minotaur IV.					
30 September; 17:01	(Russia) Molniya-M / 2BL		(Russia) Plesetsk Site 16/2		(Russia) RVSN RF	
30 September; 17:01	(Russia) Kosmos 2469 (Oko)	VKS	Molniya	Missile defense	15 October 2022	Successful
30 September; 17:01	Final flight of Molniya-M.					
← Jan; Feb; Mar; Apr; May; Jun; Jul; Aug; Sep; Oct; Nov; Dec →; === October ===
1 October; 10:59:57	(China) Long March 3C		(China) Xichang LC-2		(China) CNSA	
1 October; 10:59:57	(China) Chang'e 2	CNSA	Selenocentric	Lunar orbiter	In orbit	Operational
6 October; 00:49	(China) Long March 4B		(China) Taiyuan LC-2		(China) CNSA	
6 October; 00:49	(China) Shijian 6-04A	CNSA	Low Earth (SSO)	Technology demonstration	In orbit	Operational
6 October; 00:49	(China) Shijian 6-04B	CNSA	Low Earth (SSO)	Technology demonstration	In orbit	Operational
7 October; 23:10:57	(Russia) Soyuz-FG		(Kazakhstan) Baikonur Site 1/5		(Russia) Roscosmos	
7 October; 23:10:57	(Russia) Soyuz TMA-01M	Roscosmos	Low Earth (ISS)	Expedition 25	16 March 2011; 07:54	Successful
7 October; 23:10:57	Crewed flight with three cosmonauts, maiden flight of modernised Soyuz-TMA spacecraft.					
14 October; 18:53	(Russia) Proton-M / Briz-M		(Kazakhstan) Baikonur Site 81/24		(Russia) (United States) International Launch Services	
14 October; 18:53	(United States) XM-5	XM Satellite Radio	Geosynchronous	Communications	In orbit	Operational
19 October; 17:10:59	(Russia) Soyuz-2.1a / Fregat		(Kazakhstan) Baikonur Site 31/6		rocket= (France) (Russia) Starsem	
19 October; 17:10:59	(United States) Globalstar-2 #1	Globalstar	Low Earth	Communications	In orbit	Operational
19 October; 17:10:59	(United States) Globalstar-2 #2	Globalstar	Low Earth	Communications	In orbit	Operational
19 October; 17:10:59	(United States) Globalstar-2 #3	Globalstar	Low Earth	Communications	In orbit	Operational
19 October; 17:10:59	(United States) Globalstar-2 #4	Globalstar	Low Earth	Communications	In orbit	Operational
19 October; 17:10:59	(United States) Globalstar-2 #5	Globalstar	Low Earth	Communications	In orbit	Operational
19 October; 17:10:59	(United States) Globalstar-2 #6	Globalstar	Low Earth	Communications	In orbit	Operational
27 October; 15:11:53	(Russia) Soyuz-U		(Kazakhstan) Baikonur Site 1/5		(Russia) Roscosmos	
27 October; 15:11:53	(Russia) Progress M-08M / 40P	Roscosmos	Low Earth (ISS)	ISS logistics	24 January 2011	Successful
27 October; 15:11:53	ISS flight 40P.					
28 October; 21:51	(France) Ariane 5 ECA		(France) Kourou ELA-3		(France) Arianespace	
28 October; 21:51	(France) Eutelsat W3B	Eutelsat	Intended: Geosynchronous; Actual: GTO	Communications	In orbit	Spacecraft failure
28 October; 21:51	(Japan) BSAT-3b	BSAT	Geosynchronous	Communications	In orbit	Operational
28 October; 21:51	Eutelsat W3B written-off as a total loss immediately after launch due to an oxidizer leak in the satellite's main propulsion system.					
31 October; 16:26	(China) Long March 3C		(China) Xichang LC-2		(China) CNSA	
31 October; 16:26	(China) Compass-G4	CNSA	Geosynchronous	Navigation	In orbit	Operational
← Jan; Feb; Mar; Apr; May; Jun; Jul; Aug; Sep; Oct; Nov; Dec →; === November ===
2 November; 00:59	(Russia) Soyuz-2.1a / Fregat		(Russia) Plesetsk Site 43/4		(Russia) RVSN RF	
2 November; 00:59	(Russia) Meridian 3	VKS	Molniya	Communications	In orbit	Operational
4 November; 18:37	(China) Long March 4C		(China) Taiyuan LC-2		(China) CNSA	
4 November; 18:37	(China) Fengyun 3B	CNSA	Low Earth (SSO)	Meteorology	In orbit	Operational
6 November; 02:20	(United States) Delta II 7420-10		(United States) Vandenberg SLC-2W		(United States) United Launch Alliance	
6 November; 02:20	(Italy) COSMO-4	ASI	Low Earth (SSO)	Earth observation	In orbit	Operational
6 November; 02:20	Final flight of Delta II 7420.					
14 November; 17:29	(Russia) Proton-M / Briz-M Enhanced		(Kazakhstan) Baikonur Site 200/39		(Russia) (United States) International Launch Services	
14 November; 17:29	(United States) SkyTerra-1	SkyTerra	Geosynchronous	Communications	In orbit	Operational
20 November; 01:25	(United States) Minotaur IV / HAPS		(United States) Kodiak LP-1		(United States) Orbital Sciences	
20 November; 01:25	(United States) STPSat-2	STP	Low Earth	Technology demonstration	In orbit	Operational
20 November; 01:25	⚀ (United States) O/OREOS	NASA AMES	Low Earth	Technology demonstration	In orbit	Operational
20 November; 01:25	⚀ (United States) RAX	University of Michigan	Low Earth	Auroral	In orbit	Operational
20 November; 01:25	(United States) FASTSAT	NASA	Low Earth	Technology demonstration	In orbit	Partial spacecraft failure
20 November; 01:25	⚀ (United States) NanoSail-D2	NASA	Low Earth	Technology demonstration	17 September 2011	Successful
20 November; 01:25	(United States) Sara-Lily (FASTRAC 1)	Texas	Low Earth	Technology demonstration	In orbit	Operational
20 November; 01:25	(United States) Emma (FASTRAC 2)	UT Austin	Low Earth	Technology demonstration	In orbit	Operational
20 November; 01:25	(United States) USA-221 / FalconSat-5	USAFA	Low Earth	Technology demonstration	In orbit	Operational
20 November; 01:25	Maiden flight of Minotaur IV/HAPS. NanoSail-D2 should have been deployed from FASTSAT seven days after launch, immediate deployment failed but ejection was confirmed almost two months later on 19 January 2011					
21 November; 22:58	(United States) Delta IV Heavy		(United States) Cape Canaveral SLC-37B		(United States) United Launch Alliance	
21 November; 22:58	(United States) USA-223 / Orion 7	NRO	Geosynchronous	Reconnaissance	In orbit	Operational
21 November; 22:58	NROL-32 mission.					
24 November; 16:09	(China) Long March 3A		(China) Xichang LC-3		(China) CNSA	
24 November; 16:09	(China) Chinasat 20A	CNSA	Geosynchronous	Communications	In orbit	Operational
26 November; 18:39	(France) Ariane 5 ECA		(France) Kourou ELA-3		(France) Arianespace	
26 November; 18:39	(United Nations) Intelsat 17	Intelsat	Geosynchronous	Communications	In orbit	Operational
26 November; 18:39	(United Kingdom) HYLAS-1	Avanti	Geosynchronous	Communications	In orbit	Operational
26 November; 18:39	40th consecutive Ariane 5 launch success.					
← Jan; Feb; Mar; Apr; May; Jun; Jul; Aug; Sep; Oct; Nov; Dec →; === December ===
5 December; 10:25	(Russia) Proton-M / DM-03 Enhanced		(Kazakhstan) Baikonur Site 81/24		(Russia) Roscosmos	
5 December; 10:25	(Russia) Glonass-M 739	VKS	Intended: Medium Earth	Navigation	5 December	Launch failure
5 December; 10:25	(Russia) Glonass-M 740	VKS	Intended: Medium Earth	Navigation	5 December	Launch failure
5 December; 10:25	(Russia) Glonass-M 741	VKS	Intended: Medium Earth	Navigation	5 December	Launch failure
5 December; 10:25	Maiden flight of Blok DM-03. Incorrect fuelling of upper stage led to mass being too great to achieve parking orbit, reentered over the Pacific Ocean.					
8 December; 15:43	(United States) Falcon 9 v1.0		(United States) Cape Canaveral SLC-40		(United States) SpaceX	
8 December; 15:43	(United States) Dragon C1	SpaceX / NASA	Low Earth	Flight test	8 December; 19:02	Successful
8 December; 15:43	⚀ (United States) SMDC-ONE 1	U.S. Army	Low Earth	Communications	12 January 2011	Successful
8 December; 15:43	⚀ (United States) Mayflower-Caerus	Northrop Grumman / USC	Low Earth	Technology demonstration	22 December	Successful
8 December; 15:43	⚀ (United States) QbX-1	NRO	Low Earth	Technology demonstration	6 January 2011	Successful
8 December; 15:43	⚀ (United States) QbX-2	NRO	Low Earth	Technology demonstration	16 January 2011	Successful
8 December; 15:43	⚀ (United States) Perseus 000	LANL	Low Earth	Technology demonstration	30 December	Successful
8 December; 15:43	⚀ (United States) Perseus 001	LANL	Low Earth	Technology demonstration	31 December	Successful
8 December; 15:43	⚀ (United States) Perseus 002	LANL	Low Earth	Technology demonstration	30 December	Successful
8 December; 15:43	⚀ (United States) Perseus 003	LANL	Low Earth	Technology demonstration	31 December	Successful
8 December; 15:43	COTS Demo 1; maiden flight of the SpaceX Dragon; Mayflower included Caerus payload operated by USC.					
15 December; 19:09	(Russia) Soyuz-FG		(Kazakhstan) Baikonur Site 1/5		(Russia) Roscosmos	
15 December; 19:09	(Russia) Soyuz TMA-20	Roscosmos	Low Earth (ISS)	Expedition 26	24 May 2011; 02:27	Successful
15 December; 19:09	Crewed flight with three cosmonauts.					
17 December; 20:04	(China) Long March 3A		(China) Xichang LC-3		(China) CNSA	
17 December; 20:04	(China) Compass IGSO-2	CNSA	IGSO	Navigation	In orbit	Operational
25 December; 10:34	(India) GSLV Mk.I		(India) Satish Dhawan SLP		(India) ISRO	
25 December; 10:34	(India) GSAT-5P	ISRO	Intended: Geosynchronous	Communications	25 December	Launch failure
25 December; 10:34	Disintegrated during first stage flight.					
26 December; 22:51	(Russia) Proton-M / Briz-M Enhanced		(Kazakhstan) Baikonur Site 200/39		(Russia) (United States) International Launch Services	
26 December; 22:51	(France) KA-SAT	Eutelsat	Geosynchronous	Communications	In orbit	Operational
29 December; 21:27	(France) Ariane 5 ECA		(France) Kourou ELA-3		(France) Arianespace	
29 December; 21:27	(Spain) Hispasat-1E	Hispasat	Geosynchronous	Communications	In orbit	Operational
29 December; 21:27	(South Korea) Koreasat 6	Koreasat	Geosynchronous	Communications	In orbit	Operational

- ← Jan
- Feb
- Mar
- Apr
- May
- Jun
- Jul
- Aug
- Sep
- Oct
- Nov
- Dec →

== Suborbital flights ==
Date and time (UTC)	Rocket	Flight number	Launch site		LSP	
Date and time (UTC)	Payload (⚀ = CubeSat)	Operator	Orbit	Function	Decay (UTC)	Outcome
Date and time (UTC)	Remarks					
10 January; 23:00:00	(Canada) Black Brant IX		(United States) San Nicolas		(United States) NASA	
10 January; 23:00:00	(United States) MARTI	U.S. Air Force	Suborbital	Target	10 January	Successful
11 January; 11:55	(China) CSS-X-11		(China) Shuangchengzi Space and Missile Center		(China) PLA	
11 January; 11:55		PLA	Suborbital	ABM target	11 January	Successful
11 January; 11:55	Target					
11 January; 12:00	(China) SC-19		(China) Korla Missile Test Complex		(China) PLA	
11 January; 12:00		PLA	Suborbital	ABM test	11 January	Successful
11 January; 12:00	Interceptor					
14 January; 06:50	(India) RH-300 Mk.II		(India) TERLS		(India) ISRO	
14 January; 06:50		ISRO	Suborbital	Solar/Aeronomy	14 January	Successful
14 January; 06:50	Apogee: 116 km (72 mi)					
14 January; 07:35	(India) RH-300 Mk. II		(India) TERLS		(India) ISRO	
14 January; 07:35		ISRO	Suborbital	Solar/Aeronomy	14 January	Successful
14 January; 07:35	Apogee: 116 km (72 mi)					
14 January; 07:45	(India) RH-560 Mk.II		(India) Satish Dhawan		(India) ISRO	
14 January; 07:45		ISRO	Suborbital	Solar/Aeronomy	14 January	Successful
14 January; 07:45	Apogee: 548 km (341 mi)					
15 January; 06:50	(India) RH-300 Mk. II		(India) TERLS		(India) ISRO	
15 January; 06:50		ISRO	Suborbital	Solar/Aeronomy	15 January	Successful
15 January; 06:50	Apogee: 116 km (72 mi)					
15 January; 07:35	(India) RH-300 Mk. II		(India) TERLS		(India) ISRO	
15 January; 07:35		ISRO	Suborbital	Solar/Aeronomy	15 January	Successful
15 January; 07:35	Apogee: 116 km (72 mi)					
15 January; 10:30	(India) RH-300 Mk. II		(India) TERLS		(India) ISRO	
15 January; 10:30		ISRO	Suborbital	Solar/Aeronomy	15 January	Successful
15 January; 10:30	Apogee: 116 km (72 mi)					
15 January; 07:45	(India) RH-560 Mk. II		(India) Satish Dhawan		(India) ISRO	
15 January; 07:45		ISRO	Suborbital	Solar/Aeronomy	15 January	Successful
15 January; 07:45	Apogee: 523 km (325 mi)					
27 January; 08:25	(France) M51		(France) Le Terrible, Audierne Bay		(France) DGA	
27 January; 08:25		DGA	Suborbital	Missile test	27 January	Successful
27 January; 08:25	First launch of M51 from a submarine					
31 January; 11:40	(United States) UGM-96 Trident I C4 (LV-2)	FTG-06	(Marshall Islands) Meck		(United States) MDA	
31 January; 11:40		MDA	Suborbital	ABM target	30 January	Successful
31 January; 11:40	Maiden flight of Trident I in LV-2 configuration, interceptor failed					
31 January	(United States) Ground Based Interceptor	FTG-06	(United States) Vandenberg LF-23		(United States) MDA	
31 January		MDA	Suborbital	ABM test	30 January	Spacecraft failure
31 January	Radar tracking problem caused by unexpected "chuffing", compounded by thruster problem on interceptor, resulted in failure to intercept Trident					
3 February	(Iran) Kavoshgar (Naze'at-based)		(Iran) Semnan Space Center		(Iran) ISA	
3 February	(Iran) Kavoshgar-3	ISA	Suborbital	Biological	3 February	Successful
4 February; 08:03:07	(Canada) Black Brant IX		(United States) San Nicolas		(United States) NASA	
4 February; 08:03:07	(United States) MARTI	U.S. Air Force	Suborbital	Target	4 February	Successful
7 February; 05:20	(India) Agni-III		(India) ITR IC-4		(India) DRDO	
7 February; 05:20		DRDO	Suborbital	Missile test	7 February	Successful
7 February; 05:20	Travelled 3,500 km (2,175 mi) downrange					
9 February; 09:01:00	(United States) Terrier-Orion		(United States) Poker Flat		(United States) NASA	
9 February; 09:01:00		Alaska	Suborbital	Auroral	9 February	Successful
12 February; 04:44	(Russia) R-17 Elbrus		(United States) Ship, Pacific Ocean		(United States) U.S. Air Force	
12 February; 04:44		U.S. Air Force	Suborbital	Target	12 February	Successful
12 February; 04:44	Destroyed by Boeing YAL-1 aircraft					
12 February; 05:31:20	(Canada) Black Brant IX		(United States) San Nicolas		(United States) NASA	
12 February; 05:31:20	(United States) MARTI	U.S. Air Force	Suborbital	Target	12 February	Successful
15 February; 09:49:11	(Canada) Black Brant XII		(United States) Poker Flat		(United States) NASA	
15 February; 09:49:11		Dartmouth	Suborbital	Auroral	15 February	Successful
15 February; 09:49:11	Apogee: 803 km (499 mi)					
17 February	(United States) Juno		(United States) Fort Wingate LC-96		(United States) US Army	
17 February		US Army	Suborbital	Target	17 February	Successful
17 February	Target for MIM-104 Patriot PAC-3 MSE test, successful intercept					
4 March; 04:50	(Russia) R-29RMU Sineva		(Russia) K-114 Tula, Barents Sea		(Russia) VMF	
4 March; 04:50		VMF	Suborbital	Missile test	4 March	Successful
15 March	(India) Prithvi		(India) ITR IC-4		(India) DRDO	
15 March		DRDO	Suborbital	Target	15 March	Launch failure
15 March	Target for ABM test, deviated from planned course, interceptor not launched					
22 March	(United States) Terrier Mk.70-Orion		(Australia) Woomera LA-2		(Australia) (United States) DSTO/U.S. Air Force	
22 March	(Australia) (United States) HIFiRE-1	DSTO/U.S. Air Force	Suborbital	Technology demonstration	22 March	Successful
22 March	Hypersonic research experiment					
26 March; 13:43	(United States) / Maxus		(Sweden) Esrange		EuroLaunch	
26 March; 13:43	(Sweden) MAXUS-8	SSC / ESA	Suborbital	Microgravity	26 March; 13:55	Successful
26 March; 13:43	Apogee: 700 km (435 mi)					
27 March; 00:14	(India) Dhanush		(India) INS Subhadra Indian Ocean		(India) DRDO	
27 March; 00:14		DRDO	Suborbital	Missile test	27 March	Successful
27 March; 00:18	(India) Prithvi II		(India) Integrated Test Range IC-3		(India) DRDO	
27 March; 00:18		DRDO	Suborbital	Missile test	27 March	Successful
27 March; 14:09:56	(United States) Terrier-Improved Malemute		(United States) Wallops Island LA-1/50K		(United States) NASA	
27 March; 14:09:56		NASA	Suborbital	Test flight	27 March	Successful
27 March; 14:09:56	(United States) SOCEM	CalPoly	Suborbital	Technology demonstration	27 March	Successful
27 March; 14:09:56	(United States) ADAMASat	Kentucky Space	Suborbital	Technology demonstration	27 March	Successful
27 March; 14:09:56	Maiden flight of Terrier-Improved Malemute, apogee: 270 km (168 mi)					
27 March; 19:37	(India) Agni I		(India) Integrated Test Range IC-4		(India) Indian Army	
27 March; 19:37		Indian Army	Suborbital	Missile test	28 March	Successful
22 April; 23:00	(United States) Minotaur IV Lite		(United States) Vandenberg SLC-8		(United States) Orbital Sciences	
22 April; 23:00	(United States) HTV-2a	U.S. Air Force	Suborbital	Technology demonstration	22 April	Spacecraft failure
22 April; 23:00	Maiden flight of Minotaur IV, loss of contact with HTV nine minutes after launch.					
3 May; 09:47:00	(Canada) Black Brant IX		(United States) San Nicolas		(United States) NASA	
3 May; 09:47:00	(United States) MARTI	U.S. Air Force	Suborbital	Target	3 May	Successful
3 May; 18:32:00	(Canada) Black Brant IX		(United States) White Sands		(United States) NASA	
3 May; 18:32:00	(United States) EVE	CU Boulder	Suborbital	Geospace/Solar	3 May	Successful
3 May; 18:32:00	Used to calibrate the Solar Dynamics Observatory					
4 May; 12:41:02	(United States) SpaceLoft XL		(United States) Spaceport America		(United States) UP Aerospace	
4 May; 12:41:02	(United States) RocketSat	CSG	Suborbital	Technology demonstration	4 May	Successful
4 May; 12:41:02		NMSU	Suborbital	Technology demonstration	4 May	Successful
4 May; 12:41:02		UNM	Suborbital	Technology demonstration	4 May	Successful
4 May; 12:41:02	(United States) Pioneer	Celestis	Suborbital	Space burial	4 May	Successful
4 May; 12:41:02	Reached an apogee of 113 km (70 mi), successfully recovered.					
6 May; 03:50	Taiwan Sounding Rocket	Sounding Rocket VII	(Taiwan) Jiu Peng Air Base		(Taiwan) NSPO	
6 May; 03:50	(Taiwan) Ion probe	NSPO/NCU	Suborbital	Ionospheric research	6 May	Successful
6 May; 03:50	Apogee: 289 km (180 mi)					
8 May	(Pakistan) Ghaznavi		(Pakistan) Sonmiani		(Pakistan) ASFC	
8 May		ASFC	Suborbital	Missile test	8 May	Successful
8 May	(Pakistan) Shaheen-I		(Pakistan) Sonmiani		(Pakistan) ASFC	
8 May		ASFC	Suborbital	Missile test	8 May	Successful
17 May; 11:29	(India) Agni-II		(India) ITR IC-3		(India) Indian Army	
17 May; 11:29		Indian Army	Suborbital	Missile test	17 May	Successful
17 May; 11:29	Travelled 2,500 km (1,553 mi) downrange					
21 May; 09:00:00	(Canada) Black Brant IX		(United States) White Sands		(United States) NASA	
21 May; 09:00:00	(United States) DICE	CU Boulder	Suborbital	Astronomy	21 May	Spacecraft failure
6 June; 22:25	(United States) Ground Based Interceptor		(United States) Vandenberg LF-24		(United States) MDA	
6 June; 22:25		MDA	Suborbital	Test flight	6 June	Successful
6 June; 22:25	Two stage test vehicle, non-intercept test					
8 June	(United States) UGM-133 Trident II D5		(United States) USS Maryland, ETR		(United States) US Navy	
8 June		US Navy	Suborbital	Test flight	8 June	Successful
8 June	Follow-on Commander's Evaluation Test 42					
8 June	(United States) UGM-133 Trident II D5		(United States) USS Maryland, ETR		(United States) US Navy	
8 June		US Navy	Suborbital	Test flight	8 June	Successful
8 June	Follow-on Commander's Evaluation Test 42					
9 June	(United States) UGM-133 Trident II D5		(United States) USS Maryland, ETR		(United States) US Navy	
9 June		US Navy	Suborbital	Test flight	9 June	Successful
9 June	Follow-on Commander's Evaluation Test 43					
9 June	(United States) UGM-133 Trident II D5		(United States) USS Maryland, ETR		(United States) US Navy	
9 June		US Navy	Suborbital	Test flight	9 June	Successful
9 June	Follow-on Commander's Evaluation Test 43					
16 June; 10:01	(United States) LGM-30G Minuteman III		(United States) Vandenberg LF-10		(United States) U.S. Air Force	
16 June; 10:01		U.S. Air Force	Suborbital	Missile test	16 June	Successful
16 June; 10:01	Travelled 6,743 km (4,190 mi) to Kwajalein Atoll					
24 June; 11:17:00	(United States) Terrier-Orion		(United States) Wallops Island LA-2/MRL		(United States) NASA	
24 June; 11:17:00	(United States) RockOn!	Colorado	Suborbital	Student research	24 June	Successful
30 June; 10:40:01	(United States) LGM-30G Minuteman III		(United States) Vandenberg LF-04		(United States) U.S. Air Force	
30 June; 10:40:01		U.S. Air Force	Suborbital	Missile test	30 June	Successful
10 July; 11:32	(France) M51		(France) Le Terrible, Audierne Bay		(France) DGA/Marine nationale	
10 July; 11:32		DGA/Marine nationale	Suborbital	Test flight	10 July	Successful
11 July	(Canada) Black Brant IX		(United States) White Sands		(United States) NASA	
11 July	(United States) CIBER	Caltech	Suborbital	Astronomy	11 July	Successful
27 July	(India) Prithvi		(India) ITR IC-4		(India) DRDO	
27 July		DRDO	Suborbital	Target	27 July	Successful
27 July	Target for ABM test, intercepted successfully by AAD					
30 July; 18:18	(Canada) Black Brant IX		(United States) White Sands		(United States) NASA	
30 July; 18:18	(United States) SUMI	NASA	Suborbital	Solar	30 July	Successful
4 August; 09:15	(Canada) Black Brant X		(United States) Wallops Island LA-1/50K		(United States) NASA	
4 August; 09:15		NASA	Suborbital	Test flight Technology	4 August	Successful
4 August; 09:15	Tests of Nihka rocket motor, with secondary technology experiments					
6 August	(Russia) R-29RMU Sineva		(Russia) K-114 Tula, Barents Sea		(Russia) VMF	
6 August		VMF	Suborbital	Missile test	6 August	Successful
6 August	(Russia) R-29RMU Sineva		(Russia) K-114 Tula, Barents Sea		(Russia) VMF	
6 August		VMF	Suborbital	Missile test	6 August	Successful
23 August; 17:57	(Canada) Black Brant IX		(United States) White Sands		(United States) NASA	
23 August; 17:57	(United States) RAISE	SwRI	Suborbital	Solar	23 August	Successful
30 August; 20:00	(Japan) S-520		(Japan) Uchinoura		(Japan) JAXA	
30 August; 20:00		JAXA/TMU/Kagawa /Shizuoka	Suborbital	Technology demonstration	30 August	Partial spacecraft failure
30 August; 20:00	High-voltage control experiments not conducted as planned					
17 September; 10:03	(United States) LGM-30G Minuteman III		(United States) Vandenberg LF-09		(United States) U.S. Air Force	
17 September; 10:03		U.S. Air Force	Suborbital	Test flight	17 September	Successful
21 September; 13:07:30	(United States) Terrier-Orion		(United States) Wallops Island LA-2/MRL		(United States) NASA	
21 September; 13:07:30	(United States) SubTec-III	NASA	Suborbital	Technology demonstration	21 September; 13:23	Successful
6 October	(United States) ARAV-B (Terrier-Oriole)?		(United States) Kauai		(United States) MDA	
6 October		MDA	Suborbital	Aegis radar target	6 October	Successful
6 October	Aegis radar target, detected by STSS-Satellites					
6 October	(United States) ARAV-B (Terrier-Oriole)?		(United States) Kauai		(United States) MDA	
6 October		MDA	Suborbital	Aegis radar target	6 October	Successful
6 October	Aegis radar target, detected by STSS-Satellites					
7 October; 03:10	(Russia) RSM-56 Bulava		(Russia) TK-208 Dmitri Donskoi, White Sea		(Russia) VMF	
7 October; 03:10		VMF	Suborbital	Missile test	7 October	Successful
21 October; 17:00	(Canada) Black Brant IX		(United States) San Nicolas		(United States) NASA	
21 October; 17:00		U.S. Air Force	Suborbital	Target	21 October	Successful
27 October; 10:15	(United States) Nike Orion		(Sweden) Esrange		EuroLaunch	
27 October; 10:15	(Germany) MAPHEUS-2	DLR	Suborbital	Technology demonstration	27 October	Successful
27 October; 10:15	Apogee: 153 km (95 mi)					
28 October; 09:59	(Russia) RS-12M Topol		(Russia) Plesetsk		(Russia) RVSN	
28 October; 09:59		RVSN	Suborbital	Missile test	28 October	Successful
28 October; 10:30	(Russia) R-29RMU Sineva		(Russia) K-117 Bryansk, Barents Sea		(Russia) VMF	
28 October; 10:30		VMF	Suborbital	Missile test	28 October	Successful
28 October; 10:30	(Russia) R-29R Volna		(Russia) K-433 Svyatoy Georgiy Pobedonosets, Sea of Okhotsk		(Russia) VMF	
28 October; 10:30		VMF	Suborbital	Missile test	28 October	Successful
29 October; 01:10	(Russia) RSM-56 Bulava		(Russia) TK-208 Dmitri Donskoi, White Sea		(Russia) VMF	
29 October; 01:10		VMF	Suborbital	Missile test	29 October	Successful
29 October; 03:06		JFTM-4	(United States) Kauai		(United States) MDA	
29 October; 03:06		JMSDF/MDA	Suborbital	ABM target	29 October	Successful
29 October; 03:06	Apogee: 161 km (100 mi), intercepted by SM-3					
29 October; 03:09	(United States) RIM-161 SM-3	JFTM-4	(Japan) JDS Kirishima, Pacific Ocean		(Japan) JMSDF	
29 October; 03:09		JMSDF	Suborbital	ABM test	29 October	Successful
29 October; 03:09	Apogee: 161 km (100 mi), intercepted target					
25 November; 04:40	(India) Agni I		(India) Integrated Test Range IC-4		(India) Indian Army	
25 November; 04:40		Indian Army	Suborbital	Missile test	25 November	Successful
4 December; 04:21	(United States) Nike-Improved Orion		(Norway) Andøya		(Norway) Andøya	
4 December; 04:21	(Norway) (Germany) ECOMA 2010-1	Andøya/DLR	Suborbital	Aeronomy	4 December	Successful
5 December; 19:11	(Russia) RS-12M Topol		(Russia) Kapustin Yar		(Russia) RVSN	
5 December; 19:11		RVSN	Suborbital	Missile test	5 December	Successful
6 December; 16:45	(Canada) Terrier-Orion		(United States) White Sands		(United States) NASA	
6 December; 16:45	(United States) TRaiNED	NASA	Suborbital	Technology demonstration	6 December	Successful
6 December; 17:19	(Brazil) Improved Orion		(Brazil) Alcântara		(Brazil) AEB	
6 December; 17:19	(Brazil) Maracati 2	INPE	Suborbital	Microgravity	6 December	Successful
6 December; 17:19	Test for Operation Maracati 2					
10 December	(India) Agni-II Plus		(India) ITR IC-3		(India) Indian Army	
10 December		Indian Army	Suborbital	Missile test	10 December	Launch failure
10 December	Upgraded Agni II version, fell into the sea shortly after launch					
12 December; 06:38	(Canada) Black Brant XII		(Norway) Andøya		(United States) NASA	
12 December; 06:38	(United States) RENU 1	New Hampshire	Suborbital	Geospace	12 December	Launch failure
12 December; 12:35	(Brazil) VSB-30		(Brazil) Alcântara		(Brazil) AEB	
12 December; 12:35	(Brazil) Maracati 2	INPE	Suborbital	Microgravity	12 December; 12:51	Successful
12 December; 12:35	Operation Maracati 2, MICROG 1A payload					
13 December; 03:24	(United States) Nike-Improved Orion		(Norway) Andøya		(Norway) Andøya	
13 December; 03:24	(Norway) (Germany) ECOMA 2010-2	Andøya/DLR	Suborbital	Aeronomy	13 December	Successful
15 December	(United States) UGM-96 Trident I C4 (LV-2)	FTG-06a	(Marshall Islands) Meck		(United States) MDA	
15 December		MDA	Suborbital	ABM target	15 December	Successful
15 December	(United States) Ground Based Interceptor	FTG-06a	(United States) Vandenberg LF-23		(United States) MDA	
15 December		MDA	Suborbital	ABM test	15 December	Spacecraft failure
15 December	Interceptor failed, the cause is under investigation					
19 December; 02:36	(United States) Nike-Improved Orion		(Norway) Andøya		(Norway) Andøya	
19 December; 02:36	(Norway) (Germany) ECOMA 2010-3	Andøya/DLR	Suborbital	Aeronomy	19 December	Successful
21 December	(Pakistan) Ghauri		(Pakistan) Tilla		Army of Pakistan	
21 December	(Pakistan) Haft-5	Army of Pakistan	Suborbital	Missile test	21 December	Successful
21 December	Apogee: 100 km (62 mi)					
22 December	(India) Prithvi II		(India) Integrated Test Range IC-3		(India) DRDO	
22 December		DRDO	Suborbital	Missile test	22 December	Successful
22 December	(India) Prithvi II		(India) Integrated Test Range IC-3		(India) DRDO	
22 December		DRDO	Suborbital	Missile test	22 December	Successful

== Deep space rendezvous ==
Date	Spacecraft	Event	Remarks
12 January	Cassini	65th flyby of Titan	Closest approach: 1,073 km (667 mi)
28 January	Cassini	66th flyby of Titan	Closest approach: 7,490 km (4,654 mi)
31 January	Artemis P1	Lunar flyby	Closest approach: 11,992 km (7,451 mi) at 08:13 UTC
1 February	Artemis P2	Lunar flyby	Closest approach: 69,222 km (43,013 mi) at 14:44 UTC
13 February	Artemis P1	Lunar flyby	Closest approach: 2,958 km (1,838 mi) at 10:06 UTC
13 February	Cassini	Flyby of Mimas	Closest approach: 9,520 km (5,915 mi)
16 February	Mars Express	Flyby of Phobos	Closest approach: 991 km (616 mi)
22 February	Mars Express	Flyby of Phobos	Closest approach: 574 km (357 mi)
25 February	Mars Express	Flyby of Phobos	Closest approach: 398 km (247 mi)
28 February	Mars Express	Flyby of Phobos	Closest approach: 226 km (140 mi)
1 March	Artemis P2	Lunar flyby	Closest approach: 68,036 km (42,276 mi) at 04:11 UTC
2 March	Cassini	2nd flyby of Rhea	Closest approach: 100 km (62 mi)
3 March	Cassini	Flyby of Helene	Closest approach: 1,803 km (1,120 mi)
3 March	Mars Express	Flyby of Phobos	Closest approach: 67 km (42 mi)
7 March	Mars Express	Flyby of Phobos	Closest approach: 107 km (66 mi)
10 March	Mars Express	Flyby of Phobos	Closest approach: 286 km (178 mi)
13 March	Mars Express	Flyby of Phobos	Closest approach: 476 km (296 mi)
16 March	Mars Express	Flyby of Phobos	Closest approach: 662 km (411 mi)
19 March	Mars Express	Flyby of Phobos	Closest approach: 848 km (527 mi)
23 March	Mars Express	Flyby of Phobos	Closest approach: 1,341 km (833 mi)
26 March	Mars Express	Flyby of Phobos	Closest approach: 1,304 km (810 mi)
28 March	Artemis P2	Lunar flyby	Closest approach: 9,366 km (5,820 mi) at 07:34 UTC
5 April	Cassini	67th flyby of Titan	Closest approach: 7,462 km (4,637 mi)
7 April	Cassini	2nd flyby of Dione	Closest approach: 504 km (313 mi)
28 April	Cassini	9th flyby of Enceladus	Closest approach: 103 km (64 mi)
18 May	Cassini	10th flyby of Enceladus	Closest approach: 201 km (125 mi)
20 May	Cassini	68th flyby of Titan	Closest approach: 1,400 km (870 mi)
5 June	Cassini	69th flyby of Titan	Closest approach: 2,044 km (1,270 mi)
13 June	Hayabusa	First sample return mission from asteroid	Sample canister successful recovered to Earth
21 June	Cassini	70th flyby of Titan	Closest approach: 955 km (593 mi)
7 July	Cassini	71st flyby of Titan	Closest approach: 1,005 km (624 mi)
10 July	Rosetta	Flyby of 21 Lutetia	Closest approach: 3,100 km (1,926 mi)
13 August	Cassini	11th flyby of Enceladus	Closest approach: 2,554 km (1,587 mi)
25 August	Artemis P1	LL2 orbit insertion	
24 September	Cassini	72nd flyby of Titan	Closest approach: 8,175 km (5,080 mi)
6 October	Chang'e 2	Lunar orbit insertion	
16 October	Cassini	Flyby of Pallene	Closest approach: 36,000 km (22,369 mi)
22 October	Artemis P2	LL1 orbit insertion	
4 November	Deep Impact	Flyby of Hartley 2	Closest approach: 700 km (435 mi)
11 November	Cassini	73rd flyby of Titan	
30 November	Cassini	12th flyby of Enceladus	Closest approach: 47.9 km (30 mi)
7 December	Akatsuki	1st flyby of Venus	Cytherocentric orbit insertion failure Closest approach: 550 km (342 mi)
8 December	IKAROS	Flyby of Venus	Closest approach: 80,800 km (50,207 mi)
21 December	Cassini	13th flyby of Enceladus	Closest approach: 50 km (31 mi)
December	Shin'en	Flyby of Venus	not confirmed.

Distant, non-targeted flybys of Dione, Enceladus, Mimas, Rhea, Tethys and Titan by Cassini will occur throughout the first half of the year.

== EVAs ==
Start date/time	Duration	End time	Spacecraft	Crew	Remarks
14 January; 10:05	5 hours 44 minutes	15:49	Expedition 22; ISS Pirs	(Russia) Oleg Kotov (Russia) Maksim Surayev	Prepared the Poisk module for future dockings.
12 February; 02:17	6 hours 32 minutes	08:49	STS-130; ISS Quest	(United States) Robert L. Behnken (United States) Nicholas Patrick	Removed a protective cover on a port on the Unity node where Tranquility was berthed halfway through the spacewalk. The pair then transferred a spare parts platform for the Special Purpose Dexterous Manipulator from the shuttle to the station. Once that task is completed Behnken and Patrick made several connections on the newly installed Tranquility node to begin its activation.
14 February; 02:20	5 hours 54 minutes	08:14	STS-130; ISS Quest	(United States) Robert L. Behnken (United States) Nicholas Patrick	Installed ammonia plumbing and connectors between Unity, Destiny and Tranquility and covered them with thermal insulation. Prepared the nadir port on Tranquility for the relocation of the Cupola, and installed handrails on the exterior of Tranquility.
17 February; 02:15	5 hours 48 minutes	08:03	STS-130; ISS Quest	(United States) Robert L. Behnken (United States) Nicholas Patrick	Installed additional ammonia plumbing between Unity and Tranquility, removed insulation and launch locks from the Cupola, installed additional handrails on the exterior of Tranquility and performed get-ahead tasks to support the installation of a Power Data Grapple Fixture (PDGF) on the exterior of Zarya with cable installation on Unity and the S0 truss.
9 April; 05:31	6 hours 27 minutes	11:58	STS-131; ISS Quest	(United States) Richard Mastracchio (United States) Clayton Anderson	Relocated new an ammonia tank from the Shuttle's payload bay to a temporary stowage location and disconnected the fluid lines to the old ammonia tank on the S1 truss. Retrieved a Japanese seed experiment from the exterior of the Kibo laboratory for return to earth and replaced a failed gyroscope on the S0 truss. Performed get-ahead tasks including the opening of a window flap on the zenith CBM of Harmony, and removed launch restraint bolts from a Flex Hose Rotary Coupler (FHRC) on the P1 truss.
11 April; 05:30	7 hours 26 minutes	12:56	STS-131; ISS Quest	(United States) Richard Mastracchio (United States) Clayton Anderson	The old ammonia tank was removed from the S1 truss and was replaced with the new tank. The electrical connections to the tank were made, but the fluid lines were deferred to the mission's third EVA due to time constraints since the installation was prolonged by a problem with the bolts that hold the tank to the truss. The old tank was relocated to a temporary stowage location on the station and a foot restraint was relocated in preparation for a future shuttle mission's spacewalk.
13 April; 06:14	6 hours 24 minutes	12:36	STS-131; ISS Quest	(United States) Richard Mastracchio (United States) Clayton Anderson	The fluid lines were connected to the new ammonia tank and the old tank was moved to the shuttle's payload bay for return to Earth. Micro-meteoroid debris shields from the Quest airlock which were no longer necessary were brought inside the airlock for return to Earth inside the Leonardo MPLM. The Z1 truss was prepared for the installation of a spare antenna on the next shuttle mission, and a foot restraint was relocated in preparation for a future spacewalk. The retrieval of an external carrier plate on Columbus was deferred to another shuttle mission due to time constraints after problems were encountered with attaching the old ammonia tank to a carrier in the payload bay, and several other tasks were deferred to later EVAs due to the replanning from the problems with the mission's second EVA.
17 May; 11:54	7 hours 25 minutes	19:19	STS-132; ISS Quest	(United States) Garrett Reisman (United States) Stephen G. Bowen	Installed a spare space-to-ground Ku-band antenna on the Z1 truss; installed new tool platform on Dextre, and broke torque on bolts holding replacement batteries to the ICC-VLD cargo carrier.
19 May; 10:38	7 hours 9 minutes	17:47	STS-132; ISS Quest	(United States) Stephen G. Bowen (United States) Michael T. Good	Repaired Atlantis' Orbiter Boom Sensor System (OBSS); P6 battery replacement (4 of 6 units); and removed gimbal locks from the Ku-band antenna installed on the first EVA of the mission.
21 May; 10:27	6 hours 46 minutes	17:13	STS-132; ISS Quest	(United States) Michael T. Good (United States) Garrett Reisman	P6 battery replacement (final 2 of 6 units); installed ammonia "jumpers" at the P4/P5 interface; retrieved a spare PDGF from Atlantis' payload bay and stowed it inside the Quest airlock. The spacewalkers also replenished supplies of EVA tools in toolboxes on the exterior of the station.
27 July; 04:11	6 hours 42 minutes	10:53	Expedition 24; ISS Pirs	(Russia) Fyodor Yurchikhin (Russia) Mikhail Korniyenko	Replaced an ATV video camera on Zvezda, routed command and data handling lines from Zvezda and Zarya to the new Rassvet module as well as made KURS connections between Rassvet and Zarya to allow future automated dockings to the new module. Then the two cosmonauts jettisoned the old ATV video camera.
7 August; 11:19	8 hours 3 minutes	19:22	Expedition 24; ISS Quest	(United States) Douglas H. Wheelock (United States) Tracy Caldwell Dyson	Attempted to replace failed S1 ammonia pump module. The spacewalkers did not complete all of the planned tasks due to a quick disconnect that got stuck and would not release. The pair had to complete a "bake-out" in order to ensure there was no ammonia on their suits before re-entering the Space Station.
11 August; 12:27	7 hours 26 minutes	19:53	Expedition 24; ISS Quest	(United States) Douglas H. Wheelock (United States) Tracy Caldwell Dyson	Completed removal of failed pump module from the S1 truss and began installation preparations on the replacement pump.
16 August; 10:20	7 hours 20 minutes	17:40	Expedition 24; ISS Quest	(United States) Douglas H. Wheelock (United States) Tracy Caldwell Dyson	Installed new pump module on the S1 truss.
15 November; 14:55	6 hours 27 minutes	21:22	Expedition 25; ISS Pirs	(Russia) Fyodor Yurchikhin (Russia) Oleg Skripochka	Install a multipurpose workstation on Zvezda, retrieve camera, retrieve kontur, install new materials experiment, collect samples below insulation.

== Orbital launch statistics ==
=== By country ===
For the purposes of this section, the yearly tally of orbital launches by country assigns each flight to the country of origin of the rocket, not to the launch services provider or the spaceport. For example, Dnepr rockets are counted under Ukraine even though they are launched from Russia.

Country	Launches	Successes	Failures	Partial failures
China	15	15	0	0
France	6	6	0	0
India	3	1	2	0
Israel	1	1	0	0
Japan	2	2	0	0
Russia	28	27	1	0
South Korea	1 (Note: With Russian assistance)	0	1	0
Ukraine	3 (Note: Launched from Russia)	3	0	0
United States	15	15	0	0
World	74	70	4	0

=== By rocket ===
- Ariane 5
- Atlas V
- Delta II
- Delta IV
- Delta IV Heavy
- Falcon 9
- GSLV
- H-IIA
- Long March 2
- Long March 3
- Long March 4
- Minotaur IV
- Molniya-M
- Soyuz-U
- Soyuz-FG
- Soyuz-2
- Dnepr
- Space Shuttle
- Proton-M
- Rokot
- Others

==== By family ====
Family	Country	Launches	Successes	Failures	Partial failures	Remarks
Angara	Russia	1	0	1	0	
Ariane	France	6	6	0	0	
Atlas	United States	4	4	0	0	
Delta	United States	4	4	0	0	
Falcon	United States	2	2	0	0	
GLSV	India	2	0	2	0	
H-II	Japan	2	2	0	0	
Long March	China	15	15	0	0	
Minotaur	United States	2	2	0	0	
PSLV	India	1	1	0	0	
R-7	Russia	13	13	0	0	
R-14	Russia	1	1	0	0	
R-36	Ukraine	3	3	0	0	
Shavit	Israel	1	1	0	0	
Space Shuttle	United States	3	3	0	0	
Universal Rocket	Russia	14	13	1	0	

==== By type ====
Rocket	Country	Family	Launches	Successes	Failures	Partial failures	Remarks
Ariane 5	France	Ariane	6	6	0	0	
Atlas V	United States	Atlas	4	4	0	0	
Delta II	United States	Delta	1	1	0	0	
Delta IV	United States	Delta	3	3	0	0	
Dnepr	Ukraine	R-36	3	3	0	0	
Falcon 9	United States	Falcon	2	2	0	0	Maiden flight
GSLV	India	GSLV	2	0	2	0	
H-IIA	Japan	H-II	2	2	0	0	
Kosmos	Russia	R-12/R-14	1	1	0	0	
Long March 2	China	Long March	3	3	0	0	
Long March 3	China	Long March	8	8	0	0	
Long March 4	China	Long March	4	4	0	0	
Minotaur IV	United States	Minotaur	2	2	0	0	Maiden flight
Molniya	Russia	R-7	1	1	0	0	Final flight
Naro	Russia; South Korea	Angara	1	0	1	0	
Proton	Russia	Universal Rocket	12	11	1	0	
PSLV	India	PSLV	1	1	0	0	
Shavit	Israel	Shavit	1	1	0	0	
Soyuz	Russia	R-7	10	10	0	0	
Soyuz-2	Russia	R-7	2	2	0	0	
Space Shuttle	United States	Space Shuttle	3	3	0	0	
UR-100	Russia	Universal Rocket	2	2	0	0	

==== By configuration ====
Rocket	Country	Type	Launches	Successes	Failures	Partial failures	Remarks
Ariane 5 ECA	France	Ariane 5	6	6	0	0	
Atlas V 401	United States	Atlas V	1	1	0	0	
Atlas V 501	United States	Atlas V	2	2	0	0	Maiden flight
Atlas V 531	United States	Atlas V	1	1	0	0	Maiden flight
Delta II 7420	United States	Delta II	1	1	0	0	Final flight
Delta IV-M+(4,2)	United States	Delta IV	2	2	0	0	
Delta IV Heavy	United States	Delta IV	1	1	0	0	
Dnepr	Ukraine	Dnepr	3	3	0	0	
Falcon 9 v1.0	United States	Falcon 9	2	2	0	0	Maiden flight
GSLV Mk I(c)	India	GSLV	1	0	1	0	Only flight
GSLV Mk II	India	GSLV	1	0	1	0	Maiden flight
H-IIA 202	Japan	H-IIA	2	2	0	0	
Kosmos-3M	Russia	Kosmos	1	1	0	0	Final flight
Long March 2D	China	Long March 2	3	3	0	0	
Long March 3A	China	Long March 3	3	3	0	0	
Long March 3B	China	Long March 3	1	1	0	0	
Long March 3C	China	Long March 3	4	4	0	0	
Long March 4B	China	Long March 4	1	1	0	0	
Long March 4C	China	Long March 4	3	3	0	0	
Minotaur IV	United States	Minotaur IV	1	1	0	0	Maiden flight
Minotaur IV / HAPS	United States	Minotaur IV	1	1	0	0	Maiden flight
Molniya-M / 2BL	Russia	Molniya	1	1	0	0	Final flight
Naro-1	Russia; South Korea	Naro	1	0	1	0	
Proton-M / DM-2	Russia	Proton	2	2	0	0	
Proton-M / DM-03	Russia	Proton	1	0	1	0	
Proton-M / Briz-M	Russia	Proton	9	9	0	0	
PSLV-CA	India	PSLV	1	1	0	0	
Rokot / Briz-KM	Russia	UR-100	2	2	0	0	
Shavit-2	Israel	Shavit	1	1	0	0	
Soyuz-2.1a / Fregat-M	Russia	Soyuz-2	2	2	0	0	
Soyuz-U	Russia	Soyuz	6	6	0	0	
Soyuz-FG	Russia	Soyuz	4	4	0	0	
Space Shuttle	United States	Space Shuttle	3	3	0	0	

=== By spaceport ===
- Jiuquan
- Taiyuan
- Xichang
- Kourou
- Satish Dhawan
- Palmachim
- Tanegashima
- Baikonur
- Naro
- Dombarovsky
- Plesetsk
- Cape Canaveral
- Kennedy
- Kodiak
- MARS
- Vandenberg

Site	Country	Launches	Successes	Failures	Partial failures	Remarks
Baikonur	Kazakhstan	24	23	1	0	
Cape Canaveral	United States	8	8	0	0	
Dombarovsky	Russia	1	1	0	0	
Jiuquan	China	4	4	0	0	
Kennedy	United States	3	3	0	0	
Kodiak	United States	1	1	0	0	
Kourou	France	6	6	0	0	
Naro	South Korea	1	0	1	0	
Palmachim	Israel	1	1	0	0	
Plesetsk	Russia	6	6	0	0	
Satish Dhawan	India	3	1	2	0	
Taiyuan	China	3	3	0	0	
Tanegashima	Japan	2	2	0	0	
Vandenberg	United States	3	3	0	0	
Xichang	China	8	8	0	0	
Total		74	70	4	0	

=== By orbit ===
- Transatmospheric
- Low Earth
- Low Earth (ISS)
- Low Earth (SSO)
- Low Earth (retrograde)
- Medium Earth
- Geosychronous
  (transfer)
- Inclined GSO
- High Earth
- Heliocentric

Orbital regime	Launches	Successes	Failures	Accidentally achieved	Remarks
Transatmospheric	0	0	0	0	
Low Earth	37	36	1	0	12 to ISS
Medium Earth / Molniya	6	5	1	0	
Geosynchronous / GTO	29	27	2	0	
High Earth / Lunar transfer	1	1	0	0	
Heliocentric / Planetary transfer	1	1	0	0	
Total	74	70	4	0	
