= Compass-IGSO1 =

Chinese navigation satellite

- Mission type: Navigation
- COSPAR ID: 2010-036A
- SATCAT no.: 36828
- Mission duration: 8 years

Spacecraft properties
- Bus: DFH-3
- Manufacturer: CAST

Start of mission
- Launch date: 31 July 2010, 21:30:04 UTC
- Rocket: Chang Zheng 3C
- Launch site: Xichang LC-2

Orbital parameters
- Reference system: Geocentric
- Regime: Geosynchronous
- Perigee altitude: 35,653 kilometres (22,154 mi)
- Apogee altitude: 35,924 kilometres (22,322 mi)
- Inclination: 54.47 degrees
- Period: 23.93 hours
- Epoch: 25 December 2013, 12:35:30 UTC

Compass-IGSO1, also known as Beidou-2 IGSO1, is a Chinese navigation satellite developed as part of the Compass navigation system. It was launched on 31 July 2010 aboard a Long March 3A rocket from the Xichang Satellite Launch Centre, becoming the fifth satellite in the programme. Based on the DFH-3 satellite platform, it carries an L-band navigation system and an optical synchronization link. Its timing system combines laser time transfer and single-photon detection to provide ground-to-space time synchronization with a precision of 10^-11 seconds.

== History ==
Compass-IGSO1, also known as Beidou-2 IGSO1, is a Chinese navigation satellite which will become part of the Compass navigation system. It was launched in July 2010, and became the fifth Compass satellite to be launched after Compass-M1, G2, G1, and G3. Compass-IGSO1 was launched at 21:30 GMT on 31 July 2010. The launch used a Long March 3A carrier rocket, flying from the Xichang Satellite Launch Centre. The satellite is developed in the basis of the DFH-3 satellite platform and has a lifespan of 8 years.

Compass-IGSO1 was the first satellite placed in the BeiDou-2 inclined geosynchronous orbit (IGSO) constellation. It was positioned in the first of the constellation's orbital planes, at 118° E, and its gross mass was about 2,600 kg. Its pseudo-random noise code is C06. The ground tracks of the three satellites in that plane coincide, crossing the equator at 118° E. The plane was completed by Compass-IGSO2 in December 2010 and IGSO3 in April 2011, and a second plane at 95° E was filled by IGSO4 and IGSO5 in 2011. Like the other BeiDou-2 satellites, it transmitted three open signals, B1I at 1561.098 MHz, B2I at 1207.140 MHz and B3I at 1268.520 MHz, plus three restricted-access signals on the same frequencies.

BeiDou-2 was designed to give users in the Asia-Pacific region positioning, velocity, time, wide-area differential corrections and short message services, and by the end of 2012 its constellation of 14 satellites (five geostationary, five IGSO and four medium-orbit) was complete. The regional system began providing positioning, navigation and timing services on 27 December 2012. IGSO and medium-orbit satellites of the system use a yaw-steering attitude, continuously rotating to keep one axis perpendicular to the plane formed by the Sun, the Earth and the satellite. The International GNSS Service lists Compass-IGSO1 as decommissioned in April 2026.

== Instruments ==
The primary instrument aboard Compass-IGSO1 is a navigation system operating in the L-band. Compass-IGSO1 is the second satellite of the Compass navigation system with an optical synchronization link. The timing functionality is provided by two instruments on board the space segment, the Laser Time Transfer (LTT) instrument consisting of a corner-cube retroflector array (hexagonal shape 49 × 43 cm, 90 pcs, 33 mm diameter, 770 cm^{2} reflective area) and a single-photon avalanche diode based detector developed in cooperation with FNSPE CTU. The ground segment uses the dedicated Chinese satellite laser ranging network. The combination of traditional passive laser ranging with active single photon detection aboard produces data for the ground-to-space oscillator time-base with 10^{−11} s precision.

== See also ==
- 2010 in spaceflight
- List of passive satellites
