= Globus-1M No.12L =

Russian military communications satellite

- Mission type: Military communication
- Operator: VKS
- COSPAR ID: 2010-002A
- SATCAT no.: 36358
- Mission duration: 5 years planned

Spacecraft properties
- Spacecraft type: Raduga-1M
- Manufacturer: JSC-ISS
- Launch mass: 2,500 kilograms (5,500 lb)

Start of mission
- Launch date: 28 January 2010, 00:18:00 UTC
- Rocket: Proton-M/Briz-M
- Launch site: Baikonur 81/24
- Contractor: Khrunichev

Orbital parameters
- Reference system: Geocentric
- Regime: Geostationary
- Longitude: 70° East
- Perigee altitude: 35,780 kilometres (22,230 mi)
- Apogee altitude: 35,805 kilometres (22,248 mi)
- Inclination: 0.00 degrees
- Period: 23.93 hours
- Epoch: 24 December 2013, 14:15:48 UTC

Globus-1M #12L or No.12L (Russian: Глобус-1М meaning Globe-1M), also known as Raduga-1M 2 (Russian: Радуга-1М meaning Rainbow-1M) is a Russian military communications satellite which is operated by the Russian Space Forces. It was the second Raduga-1M satellite to be launched – the first being Globus-1M #11L which was launched in 2008, and forms part of the Raduga satellite system. It is positioned in geostationary orbit at a longitude of 70 degrees East.

Globus-1M #12L was built by JSC Information Satellite Systems, and is equipped with multiple transponders broadcasting centimetre-band and decimetre-band signals. It was launched by the Khrunichev State Research and Production Space Centre, using a Proton-M carrier rocket with a Briz-M upper stage. The launch occurred at 00:18:00 GMT on 28 January 2010, from Site 81/24 at the Baikonur Cosmodrome. The launch was successful, and inserted the satellite directly into geosynchronous orbit. At launch the satellite had a mass of 2,500 kilograms (5,500 lb), with an expected operational lifespan of around 5 years.

It is currently in a geostationary orbit, with an apogee of 35,788 kilometres (22,238 mi), a perigee of 35,784 kilometres (22,235 mi), zero degrees of inclination, and an orbital period of 24 hours.

== See also ==
- 2010 in spaceflight
