= 2010 Chinese anti-ballistic missile test =

The People's Republic of China carried out a land-based high-altitude anti-ballistic missile test on 11 January 2010. This reportedly made China the second country in the world after the United States of America to successfully destroy an incoming missile beyond the Earth's atmosphere.

== Possible purpose ==
The test came just after an American official announced in Taipei that The Pentagon had just approved the sale of the MIM-104 Patriot missile system to Taiwan. In fact, the sale was part of a deal passed by the United States Congress more than a year before. Beijing considers Taiwan to be part of its territory, and its Ministry of Foreign Affairs and Ministry of National Defense had voiced its strong opposition to these sales. Observers and analysts think the test was a response to the deal, and showed Beijing's stance on the issue.

However, some others believe this test was routine, because an article appeared in the PLA Daily as early as on November 12, 2009, claiming that a new type of Chinese missile provided anti-ballistic missile capability and would go to further tests. Recently, the statements from Zhu Zhuhua (朱祝华), a director of the People's Liberation Army Air Force Equipment Research Institute (解放军空军装备研究院) supported the claim. Based on this analysis, the test was coincidental to Taiwan's weapon deal.

== Basic information ==
The flight of Intercontinental ballistic missiles has three stages in air, the boost phase (the 1st phase), the mid-course phase (the 2nd phase), and the final reentry phase (also known as terminal phase). The Chinese test targeted on the mid-course phase when the target was out of the atmosphere. The test was successful. The full name of the test is called the Test of the Land-based Mid-course Phase Anti-ballistic Missile Interception Technology (simplified Chinese: 陆基中段反导拦截技术试验). However, the exact launch sites and types of these two missiles are not clarified in Chinese news, although it was rumored that the interceptor was designated the DN-1 or "Dong Neng 1".

According to The Pentagon, Beijing did not inform the test in advance. And the statement "We detected two geographically separated missile launch events with an exo-atmospheric collision also being observed by space-based sensors", by The Pentagon spokeswoman Major Maureen Schumann, also proves the profile and results of the test.

== See also ==
Some related concepts:

- Exoatmospheric Kill Vehicle (EKV)
- Anti-ballistic missile
- Anti-satellite weapon (ASAT)
- National Missile Defense (NMD)

Organizations:

- Ballistic Missile Defense Organization, an agency of the United States Department of Defense
- Ministry of National Defense (China)

Some recent tests:

- 2007 Chinese anti-satellite missile test
- (2008) USA 193
- 2010 in spaceflight
