= GSAT-5P =

Indian communications satellite

- Mission type: Communication
- Operator: ISRO
- Mission duration: 12-14 years (planned); Failed to orbit

Spacecraft properties
- Bus: I-2K
- Manufacturer: ISRO
- Launch mass: 2,310 kilograms (5,090 lb)

Start of mission
- Launch date: 25 December 2010, 10:34 UTC
- Rocket: GSLV Mk.I F06
- Launch site: Satish Dhawan SLP

Orbital parameters
- Reference system: Geocentric
- Regime: Geostationary
- Longitude: 55° East
- Epoch: Planned

Transponders
- Band: 36 G/H band (IEEE C band)

GSAT-5P, or GSAT-5 Prime, was an Indian communications satellite which was lost in a launch failure in December 2010. Part of the Indian National Satellite System, it was intended to operate in geosynchronous orbit as a replacement for INSAT-3E.

== Satellite ==
GSAT-5P was a 2,310-kilogram (5,090 lb) spacecraft, which was built by the Indian Space Research Organisation based on the I-2K satellite bus. ISRO also launched the satellite, and was to have been responsible for its operation. It was equipped with 36 transponders operating in the G/H band of the NATO-defined spectrum, or the C band of the older IEEE spectrum. Twelve of the transponders operated on extended frequencies within the band. GSAT-5P was expected to operate for at least 12 years, and would have been placed at a longitude of 55 degrees east.

== Launch ==
The launch of GSAT-5P used a Geosynchronous Satellite Launch Vehicle Mk.I, serial number F06, and took place from the Second Launch Pad at the Satish Dhawan Space Centre. The rocket featured several modifications from previous flights, including an enlarged upper stage with more fuel to accommodate a heavier payload, and an enlarged composite payload fairing with a diameter of 4 metres (13 ft) in place of the regular 3.4 metres (11 ft) aluminium fairing.

The launch was originally scheduled for 20 December 2010, but was delayed to allow a leaking valve on the upper stage to be repaired. Following the repair of the leak, the launch was rescheduled for 25 December 2010. The countdown began 06:34 UTC on 24 December 2010. and launch occurred at 10:34 UTC on 25 December.

== Failure ==
Forty five seconds after launch the four liquid fuelled boosters attached to the first stage ceased responding to commands, resulting in a loss of control. Sixty three seconds into the flight, the Range Safety Officer activated a self-destruct mechanism aboard the rocket, causing it to explode. Debris from the launch fell into the Bay of Bengal. It was the second consecutive launch failure involving a Geosynchronous Satellite Launch Vehicle, following the loss of GSAT-4 in April 2010.

== See also ==
- 2010 in spaceflight
