= Terrier Malemute =

American sounding rocket

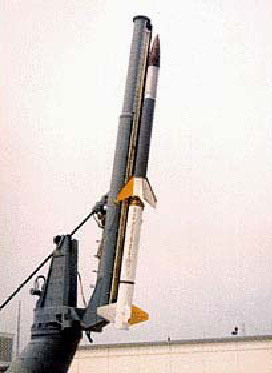
Terrier Malemute on launch tower

The Terrier Malemute is a two-stage American sounding rocket typically used for smaller payloads (less than 180 kg [400 lb]). Both the Terrier first stage and the Malemute second stage use solid propellant. The Terrier burns for approximately 5.2 seconds, and the Malemute burns for approximately 21.5 seconds. The first stage booster consists of a surplus Navy Terrier MK 12 Mod 1 rocket motor with four 0.22 m^{2} (340 sq in) fin panels arranged in a cruciform configuration. The Terrier rocket booster has a diameter of 460 mm (18 in). The second stage solid rocket is a Thiokol Malemute TU-758 rocket motor, specially designed for high altitude research rocket applications. Apogee is approximately 400 km (220 nmi) for a 230 kg (510 lb) payload or 700 km (380 nmi) for a 41 kg (90 lb) payload. For a payload weight of 200 lb (91 kg), the acceleration during the boost phase is 26 g. Its first flight was on November 11, 1974, from Barking Sands. Other launch sites have included Poker Flat, Wallops Island and Fort Yukon, Alaska.

Terrier Malemute was launched more than fifty times between 1974 and 2021:

| Date | Version | Site | Payload |
|---|---|---|---|
| 11.11.1974 | Terrier Malemute | Barking Sands | Sandia 497-002 (failure) |
| 12.05.1975 | Terrier Malemute | Barking Sands | Sandia 497-004 |
| 27.06.1975 | Terrier Malemute | Wallops Island | NASA 29.002GT (failure) |
| 15.01.1976 | Terrier Malemute | Wallops Island | NASA 12.034CT-GT (failure) |
| 11.08.1976 | Terrier Malemute | Wallops Island | NASA 12.036GT |
| 27.11.1976 | Terrier Malemute | Andøya Rocket Range | NASA 29.005IE (Ferdinand 38 (Harang)) |
| 14.01.1977 | Terrier Malemute | Poker Flat | NASA 29.003AE |
| 18.01.1977 | Terrier Malemute | Poker Flat | NASA 29.004UE (failure) |
| 10.09.1977 | Terrier Malemute | Wallops Island | Sandia 497-008 |
| 02.02.1978 | Terrier Malemute | Poker Flat | NASA 29.008UE |
| 09.03.1978 | Terrier Malemute | Poker Flat | NASA 29.007UE |
| 26.01.1979 | Terrier Malemute | Poker Flat | NASA 29.013UE (failure) |
| 15.04.1979 | Terrier Malemute | Poker Flat | NASA 29.011GE |
| 18.04.1979 | Terrier Malemute | Poker Flat | NASA 29.012GE |
| 16.07.1979 | Terrier Malemute | Roi-Namur | Sandia 497-011 (DNA PLUMEX I) |
| 23.07.1979 | Terrier Malemute | Roi-Namur | Sandia 497-012 (DNA PLUMEX II) |
| 13.10.1979 | Terrier Malemute-2 | Barking Sands | Sandia 497-010 (LASL Aguila) |
| 27.01.1980 | Terrier Malemute | Poker Flat | NASA 29.014UE (ARCS 1) |
| 07.12.1981 | Terrier Malemute-2 | Cape Parry | NASA 29.017CE (CENTAUR) |
| 21.01.1982 | Terrier Malemute | Cape Parry | NASA 29.018UE |
| 06.03.1982 | Terrier Malemute-2 | Poker Flat | NASA 29.016CE |
| 02.03.1983 | Terrier Malemute | Chilca Launch Range | NASA 29.020UE (CONDOR Cornell ESF) |
| 15.03.1983 | Terrier Malemute | Chilca Launch Range | NASA 29.019UE (CONDOR Cornell ESF) |
| 11.11.1983 | Terrier Malemute-2 | Andøya Rocket Range | NASA 29.022GE/IE (Ferdinand 63/Poleward Leap) |
| 07.02.1984 | Terrier Malemute | Fort Yukon | NASA 29.021UE (Bidarca) |
| 23.01.1985 | Terrier Malemute | Søndre Strømfjord | NASA 29.023UE (COPE) |
| 10.02.1985 | Terrier Malemute | Søndre Strømfjord | NASA 29.015UE (COPE/ARCS 3) |
| 14.07.1985 | Terrier Malemute-2 | Barking Sands | Sandia 497-013 (ACE I) |
| 27.09.1985 | Terrier Malemute-2 | Barking Sands | Sandia 497-014 (ACE II) |
| 10.10.1985 | Terrier Malemute-2 | Barking Sands | Sandia 497-015 (ACE III) |
| 10.12.1985 | Terrier Malemute-2 | Barking Sands | Sandia 497-016 (ACE IV) |
| 03.04.1986 | Terrier Malemute | Poker Flat | NASA 29.024UE |
| 26.02.1987 | Terrier Malemute | Søndre Strømfjord | NASA 29.025UE (COPE II) |
| 05.03.1987 | Terrier Malemute | Søndre Strømfjord | NASA 29.026UE (COPE II) |
| 03.04.1989 | Terrier Malemute | Wallops Island | NASA 29.027UE (RED AIR 1) |
| 04.09.1989 | Terrier Malemute | Barking Sands | SDIO Starmate |
| 11.09.1989 | Terrier Malemute | Barking Sands | SDIO Starmate |
| 29.03.1990 | Terrier Malemute | Wallops Island | SDIO Laser Target (Firefly 1) |
| 25.04.1990 | Terrier Malemute | Wallops Island | SDIO BSUV (Bow Shock 1) |
| 30.07.1990 | Terrier Malemute | Roi-Namur | NASA 29.028UE (EQUIS Spread F) |
| 02.08.1990 | Terrier Malemute | Roi-Namur | NASA 29.029UE (EQUIS Spread F) |
| 20.10.1990 | Terrier Malemute | Wallops Island | SDIO (Firefly 2) |
| 24.05.1992 | Terrier Malemute | Barking Sands | CDX (LWIS) |
| 10.06.2003 | Terrier Malemute | Wallops Island | NASA 29.035UP (DEBI, Bowshock) |
| 07.08.2004 | Terrier Malemute | Roi-Namur | NASA 29.037UE (EQUIS II) |
| 15.08.2004 | Terrier Malemute | Roi-Namur | NASA 29.036UE (EQUIS II) |
| 09.09.2017 | Terrier Malemute | Kwajalein Island | NASA 29.042UE (WINDY 2) (failure) |
| 23.04.2019 | Terrier Malemute | Barking Sands | HOT SHOT 2 |
| 24.04.2019 | Terrier Malemute | Barking Sands | HOT SHOT 3 |
| 20.10.2021 | Terrier Malemute | Wallops Island | H4H 1 |
| 20.10.2021 | Terrier Malemute | Wallops Island | H4H 2 |
| 20.10.2021 | Terrier Malemute | Wallops Island | H4H 3 |

== Terrier Improved Malemute ==
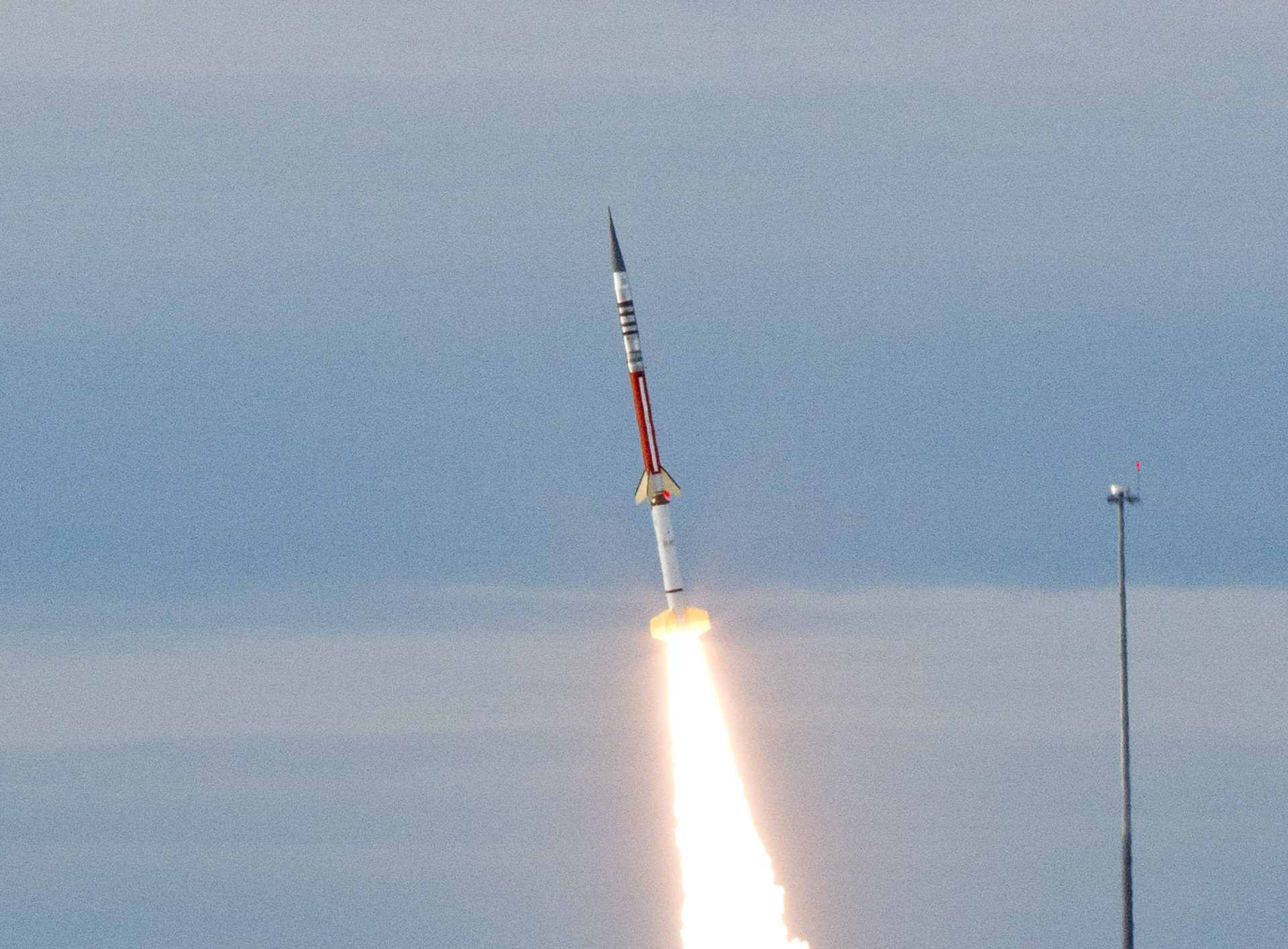
The Terrier Improved-Malemute launch vehicle

The Terrier Improved Malemute uses a Terrier Mk. 70 rocket motor for the first stage and a surplus MIM-104 Patriot motor (Thiokol TX-486-1) for the second stage. The Terrier Improved Malemute has made two successful test flights and two failed attempts. Two of these rockets were successfully used in 2012 in the Anomalous Transport Rocket Experiment (ATREX) upper atmospheric study.

On 26 November 2019, a Terrier Improved Malemute suborbital sounding rocket was launched from Ny-Ålesund, Norway. The rocket conducted the ICI-5 mission for NASA and Norwegian research institutes. The purpose of the mission was ionosphere research. The suborbital flight, with an apogee of 252 km (157 mi), was a partial failure as the rocket experienced a roll rate anomaly, precluding the on board instruments from functioning as intended.

Terrier Improved Malemute was launched more than thirty times between 2010 and 2025:

| Date | Site | Payload |
|---|---|---|
| 27.03.2010 | Wallops Island | NASA 12.067GT / ADAMASat / CP1U |
| 11.01.2012 | Wallops Island | NASA 12.074GT |
| 27.03.2012 | Wallops Island | NASA 46.002UE (ATREX 2) |
| 27.03.2012 | Wallops Island | NASA 46.003UE (ATREX 4) |
| 21.09.2012 | Wallops Island | NASA 46.004GO (RockSat-X 2) |
| 07.05.2013 | Roi-Namur | NASA 46.001UE (EVEX) |
| 13.08.2013 | Wallops Island | NASA 46.005UO (Rocksat-X 3) |
| 02.07.2014 | Wallops Island | NASA 46.007GP (SubTec 6) |
| 26.01.2015 | Poker Flat | NASA 46.009UE (M-TeX 1) |
| 26.01.2015 | Poker Flat | NASA 46.010UE (M-TeX 2) |
| 18.04.2015 | Wallops Island | NASA 46.008UO (Rocksat-X 4) |
| 12.08.2015 | Wallops Island | NASA 46.012UO (Rocksat-X 5) |
| 01.03.2016 | Wallops Island | NASA 46.011GP (MUSIC) |
| 17.08.2016 | Wallops Island | NASA 46.014UO (Rocksat-X 6) |
| 29.06.2017 | Wallops Island | NASA 46.015GT (Ampoule Test) |
| 13.08.2017 | Wallops Island | NASA 46.017UO (Rocksat-X 7) |
| 25.03.2018 | Wallops Island | NASA 46.019UO (USIP) |
| 14.08.2018 | Wallops Island | NASA 46.021UO (RockSat-X 8) |
| 13.01.2019 | Ny-Ålesund | NASA 46.018UO (G-CHASER, RockSat-XN) |
| 12.08.2019 | Wallops Island | NASA 46.022UO (RocSat-X 9) |
| 25.10.2019 | Wallops Island | NASA 46.020GT (SubTec 8) |
| 26.11.2019 | Ny-Ålesund | NASA 46.029IE (ICI 5) |
| 26.05.2021 | Wallops Island | NASA 46.028UE (VIPER) |
| 19.08.2021 | Wallops Island | NASA 46.030UO (RockSat-X 10) |
| 11.09.2021 | Wallops Island | NASA 46.033AR (HOTShot) |
| 21.03.2022 | Wallops Island | NASA 46.027DR (BOLT 2) |
| 07.04.2022 | Poker Flat | NASA 46.031UE (INCAA 1) |
| 11.08.2022 | Wallops Island | NASA 46.036UO (RockSat-X 11) |
| 24.08.2022 | Wallops Island | NASA 46.025UE (SpEED Demon) |
| 26.10.2022 | Wallops Island | HOTH 2-1 |
| 27.10.2022 | Wallops Island | HOTH 2-2 |
| 16.08.2023 | Wallops Island | NASA 46.038UO (RockSat-X 12) |
| 13.08.2024 | Wallops Island | NASA 46.042WO (RockSat-X 13) |
| 25.03.2025 | Poker Flat | NASA 46.034UE (AWESOME 1) |
| 29.03.2025 | Poker Flat | NASA 46.035UE (AWESOME 2) |
| 20.06.2025 | Roi-Namur | NASA 46.026UE (SEED 1) |
| 28.06.2025 | Roi-Namur | NASA 46.037UE (SEED 2) |

== See also ==
- Terrier Oriole
- Terrier Orion
