= Terrier Oriole =

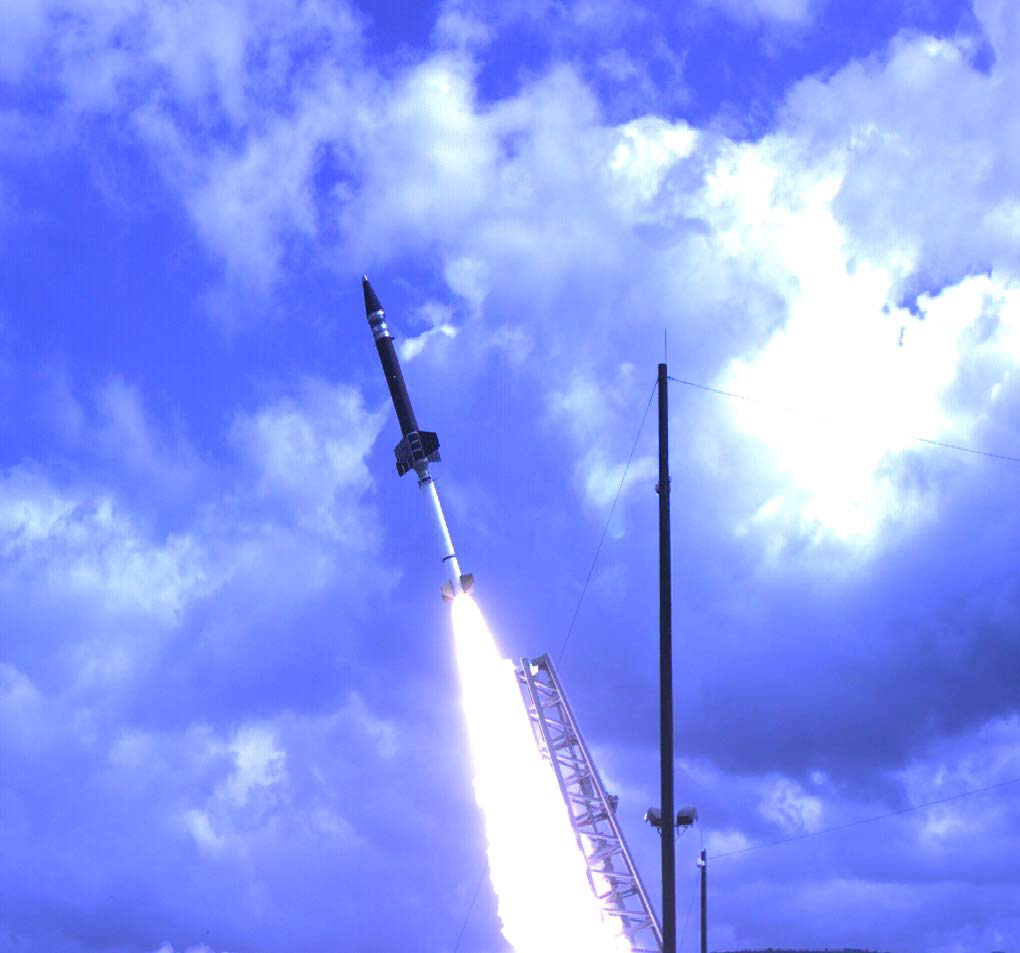
- Terrier Oriole at launch
- Function: Sounding rocket
- Manufacturer: Astrotech Space Operations
- Country of origin: United States

Size
- Height: 8.2 metres (324 in)
- Diameter: 0.56 metres (22 in)
- Stages: 2

Capacity

Payload to 340 kilometres (210 mi)
- Mass: 360 kilograms (800 lb)

Associated rockets
- Family: Terrier

Launch history
- Status: Operational
- Launch sites: Wallops Island, Barking Sands, South Uist
- Total launches: 12 minimum
- First flight: July 7, 2000

First stage – Terrier Mk 12
- Height: 3.9 metres (155 in)
- Diameter: 0.46 metres (18 in)
- Gross mass: 1,001 kilograms (2,207 lb)
- Powered by: 1
- Maximum thrust: 258 kilonewtons (58,000 lbf)
- Propellant: solid

Second stage – Oriole
- Height: 3.9 metres (155 in)
- Diameter: 0.56 metres (22 in)
- Empty mass: 198 kilograms (436 lb)
- Gross mass: 1,174 kilograms (2,588 lb)
- Propellant mass: 976 kilograms (2,152 lb)
- Powered by: 1
- Maximum thrust: 131.5 kilonewtons (29,570 lbf) (vacuum)
- Specific impulse: 288.5 s (vacuum)
- Burn time: 30 seconds
- Propellant: QDL/SAA-144 (HTPB-based APCP)

Terrier Oriole is an unguided two-stage rocket system which is primarily used by the Goddard Space Flight Center out of the Wallops Flight Facility as a sounding rocket. The system uses a Terrier first-stage booster attached to an Oriole second-stage rocket. The system can carry payloads between 800 and 1,500 pounds (360 and 680 kg) up to an altitude of 320 kilometres (200 mi). It is also used to test ballistic missile defense systems, under the name ARAV-B.

== Technical details ==
The Terrier motor is 18 inches (460 mm) in diameter and 155 inches (3,900 mm) long, and it normally uses two "spin motors", both to reduce dispersion and to serve as drag plates. It uses four equally spaced fins which are 4.8 square feet (0.45 m^{2}) and canted in such a way as to provide two revolutions per second at Terrier burnout. The weight of the Terrier booster system is 2,207 pounds (1,001 kg).

The Oriole stage is 22 inches (560 mm) in diameter and 155 inches (3,900 mm) long. It is powered by GEM-22 Graphite-Epoxy Motor. There is a 14-inch (360 mm) interstage adapter between the Terrier and Oriole systems, which allows for drag separation following Terrier burnout. The Oriole stage uses four fins in a cruciform configuration, which are canted in order to provide a spin rate of four revolutions per second upon Oriole burnout.

Standard hardware includes a nose cone and capacitive discharge ignition system. Separation systems are available for use in order to separate the payload from the motor during ascent. An ogive nose cone is also available to users, when required.

Terrier-Oriole is used to test ballistic missile defense systems, under the name Aegis Readiness Assessment Vehicle-B (ARAV-B). It is much cheaper than other ballistic missile targets.

=== T4-E ===
This T-T-O stack uses two Terrier Mk.70 (TX-664) plus the final Oriole GEM-22 as a medium range ballistic missile (MRBM) target.

In mid-November 2022, the T4-E stack was used for two live-fire events when Japanese Navy ships JS Maya and JS Haguro used RIM-161 SM-3 Block IIA missiles to engage T4-E targets in conjunction with the US Navy at the Pacific Missile Range Facility, Kauaʻi Island, Hawaii.

=== Terrier-Oriole-Oriole ===
A 3-stage rocket (a Terrier booster and two Oriole stages) is used for the test of the VMAX hypersonic glider of the French Ministry of Defense from the Biscarosse test site DGA Essais de missiles in Landes on June 26, 2023.

== See also ==
- Terrier Malemute
- Terrier-Orion
