= Compass-G1 =

Chinese navigation satellite

- Mission type: Navigation
- COSPAR ID: 2010-001A
- SATCAT no.: 36287

Spacecraft properties
- Bus: DFH-3
- Manufacturer: CAST

Start of mission
- Launch date: 16 January 2010, 16:12:04 UTC
- Rocket: Chang Zheng 3C
- Launch site: Xichang LC-2

Orbital parameters
- Reference system: Geocentric
- Regime: Geosynchronous
- Perigee altitude: 35,775 kilometres (22,230 mi)
- Apogee altitude: 35,807 kilometres (22,249 mi)
- Inclination: 1.58 degrees
- Period: 23.93 hours
- Epoch: 24 December 2013, 10:17:46 UTC

Compass-G1, also known as Beidou-2 G1, is a Chinese navigation satellite which will become part of the Compass navigation system. It was launched in January 2010, and became the third Compass satellite to be launched after Compass-M1 and Compass-G2.

Compass-G1 was launched at 16:12 GMT on 16 January 2010, and was the first orbital launch to be conducted in 2010. The launch used a Long March 3C carrier rocket, flying from the Xichang Satellite Launch Centre. It was the first flight of a Long March 3 series rocket since an upper stage engine problem in August 2009 which left the Palapa-D satellite in a lower than planned orbit. The injection systems on the rocket's third stage engines had filters fitted to them in an attempt to prevent a recurrence of this failure. The Compass-G1 launch demonstrated this new system.

Compass-G1 had originally been scheduled for launch in the first half of 2009, however it was subsequently delayed after issues developed with the Beidou-1D and Compass-G2 satellites.

== See also ==
- 2010 in spaceflight
- USA-206
