= Terrier Orion =

American sounding rocket

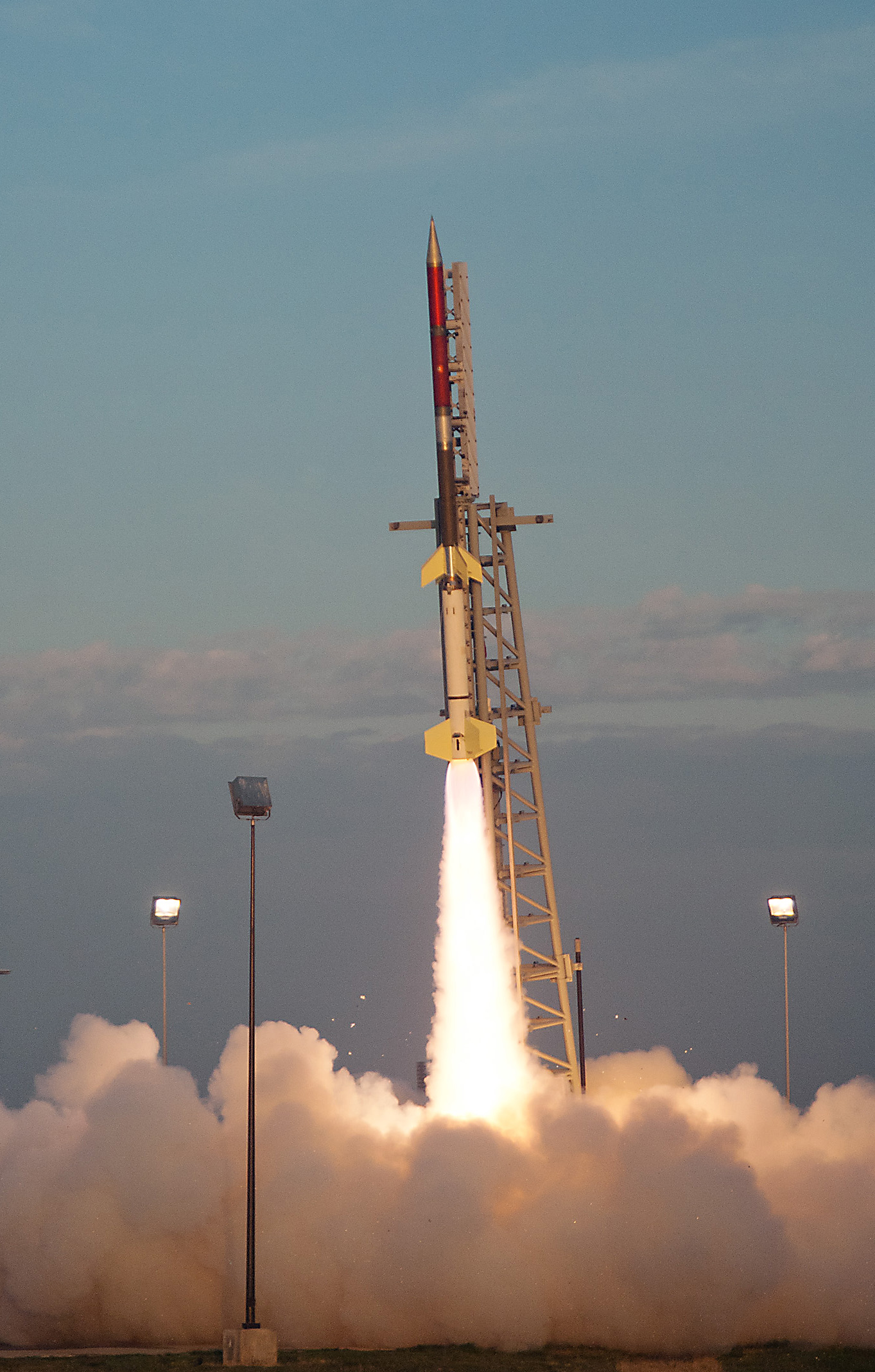
NASA's Terrier–Improved Orion rocket

The Terrier Orion sounding rocket is a combination of the Terrier booster rocket with the Orion rocket used as a second stage. This spin stabilized configuration is most often used by the Goddard Space Flight Center, who operate out of the Wallops Flight Facility for sounding rocket operations. The system supports payloads ranging from 200 to 800 pounds (90 to 360 kg), and is capable of achieving altitudes as high as 120 miles (200 km), but at least 50 miles (80 km), depending on payload size.

== Technical details ==
The Terrier Orion system is designed to be rail launched, and can be supported at most fixed and mobile launch sites. The Terrier Mk 12 Mod 1 or Mk 70 rocket used for the first stage uses an 18-inch (46 cm) diameter motor along with 2.5-or-4.8-square-foot (0.23 or 0.45 m^{2}) cruciform configured tail fins. The Improved Orion motor used in the second stage is 14 inches (36 cm) in diameter and 110 inches (280 cm) long. The system typically uses spin motors and has a total weight of approximately 2,900 pounds (1,300 kg), excluding payload.

== Improved Orion ==
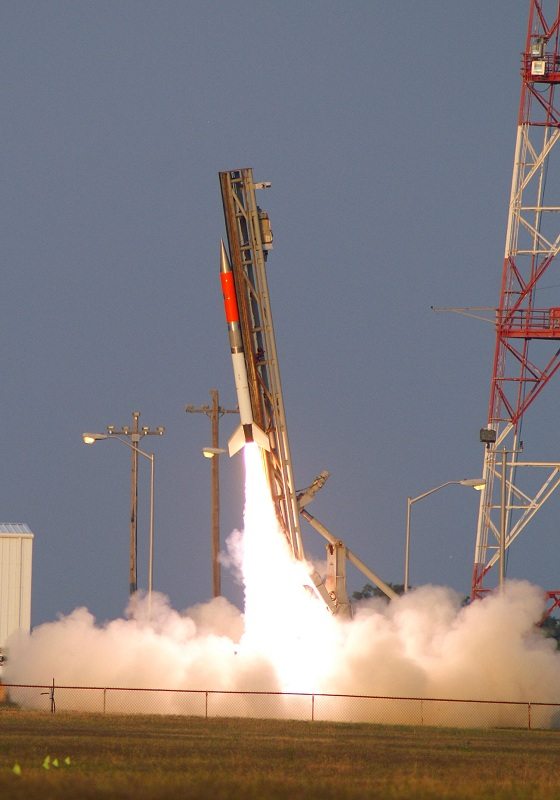
Improved Orion rocket shortly after launch

The Improved Orion motor uses a "bi-phase propellant" system which provides it with around 19,000 pounds-force (85,000 N) of thrust during the first four seconds of motor burn. The thrust then tails off to approximately 3,000 pounds-force (13,000 N) of thrust until burnout occurs at around 25 seconds. The fins are normally configured so that the rocket will have a stabilizing spin rate of approximately four cycles per second.

As a standalone rocket, it has a maximum flight altitude of 85 km, a liftoff thrust of 7.00 kN, a total mass of 400 kg, a core diameter of 0.35 m and a total length of 5.60 m, launching a total of 67 times with no attached Terrier rocket.

== See also ==
- Terrier Oriole
- Terrier Malemute
