= Raduga-1M =

Satellite chain

- Mission type: Military Communications
- Operator: Russia
- Mission duration: 10 years

Spacecraft properties
- Launch mass: 2,300 kilograms (5,100 lb)

Start of mission
- Launch date: September 12, 2007
- Rocket: Proton-M/Briz-M

Raduga-1M (Russian: Радуга-1М) is a decommissioned orbital military communications satellite built by Roscosmos as part of the Globus program. It has a launch mass of 2300 kilograms, and was first launched on September 12, 2007, on the Proton launch system. The satellite was later launched two more times as Globus-M12 and Globus M-13 from 2010 to 2013. It was decommissioned in 2013 when they did not need to make any more communication satellites. It consists of two deploy-able power arrays, as well as a battery pack.
