= WURN =

WURN may refer to:

- WURN (AM), a radio station (1040 AM) licensed to serve Miami, Florida, United States
- WURN-FM, a radio station (107.1 FM) licensed to serve Key Largo, Florida
- WLVJ (AM), a radio station (1020 AM) licensed to serve Boynton Beach, Florida, which held the call sign WURN from 2008 to 2016
