= WLVJ =

WLVJ may refer to:

- WLVJ (AM), a radio station (1020 AM) licensed to serve Boynton Beach, Florida, United States
- WURN (AM), a radio station (1040 AM) licensed to serve Miami, Florida, which held the call sign WLVJ from 2003 to 2016
