= WMYM =

Spanish-language Christian radio station in Miami

- Kendall, Florida; United States
- Broadcast area: Miami metropolitan area
- Frequency: 990 kHz
- Branding: La Poderosa

Programming
- Language: Spanish
- Format: Conservative talk radio

Ownership
- Owner: Salem Media Group; (Hispanos Communications LLC)
- Sister stations: WWFE; WRHC

History
- First air date: 1997
- Former call signs: WFBA (1997–1999)
- Call sign meaning: "Mickey Mouse" (related to former affiliation)

Technical information
- Licensing authority: FCC
- Facility ID: 12833
- Class: B
- Power: 7,500 watts (day); 5,000 watts (night)
- Transmitter coordinates: 25°37′35″N 80°31′16″W
- Translator: 98.7 W254DT (Kendall)

Links
- Public license information: Public file; LMS
- Webcast: Listen live
- Website: lapoderosa.com

WMYM (990 kHz) is an AM radio station licensed to Kendall, Florida, serving the Miami metropolitan area with a Spanish conservative talk radio format.

== History ==
WFAB "La Fabulosa" broadcast a Spanish-language format on 990 from 1962 to 1977; the station, however, lost its license due to fraudulent billing practices. The demise of WFAB led to a multi-year fight for the license, ultimately won by Community Broadcasting Company. The unbuilt construction permit was sold to W.R.A. Broadcasting in 1996, and went on the air in 1997, was WFBA. (The WFAB call sign had been assigned in the intervening 20 years to a station in Puerto Rico). While WFAB's tower site used a six-tower inline array, WMYM uses a six-tower parallelogram; the pattern had to be tightened because of an upgrade to WHSR, a Pompano Beach station on 980.

Final Radio Disney logo for WMYM.

In 1999, Disney acquired WFBA for its Radio Disney children's network, launching the format on September 17, 1999. On October 13, 1999, ABC Radio changed 990 AM's calls to WMYM (as in Disney character Mickey Mouse). On August 13, 2014, Disney put WMYM and twenty-two other Radio Disney stations up for sale, to focus on digital distribution of the Radio Disney network.

On February 12, 2015, Enrique Cusco's Actualidad Radio Group (owner of the Spanish news/talk trimulcast WLVJ, WURN and WURN-FM) announced that it would acquire WMYM (from ABC Radio/Radio Disney Group), for a price of $2,100,000. The sale was completed on May 29, 2015.

Logo as an ESPN Deportes affiliate

The station discontinued its Radio Disney affiliation and went silent on June 2, 2015. WMYM returned to the air in mid-July 2015, at the latest, and switched to sports programming from ESPN Deportes Radio, which effectively continued Disney's programming of the station. WMYM served as the flagship station for ESPN Deportes Radio's programming.

Logo as Unanimo Deportes

After ESPN Deportes Radio was discontinued on September 8, 2019, WMYM became the flagship station of the newly launched Unanimo Deportes Radio network.

Effective January 6, 2023, Salem Media Group acquired WMYM and translator W254DT from Actualidad Radio Group for $5 million. At closing, WMYM dropped Unanimo Deportes and began simulcasting WWFE, which airs a Spanish-language talk radio format. It eventually dropped the simulcast for a Spanish-language Christian radio format, branded as "Radio Trans Mundial". In June 2023, WMYM rebranded as "Radio Oasis 990" under the operation of Adrian Flores, who also operates WNMA, which is also under the "Radio Oasis" brand.

On June 6, 2025, WMYM changed their format from Spanish Christian to Spanish talk, branded as "La Poderosa" (format moved from WWFE 670 AM Miami).
