= Soyuz TMA-19 =

2010 Russian crewed spaceflight to the ISS

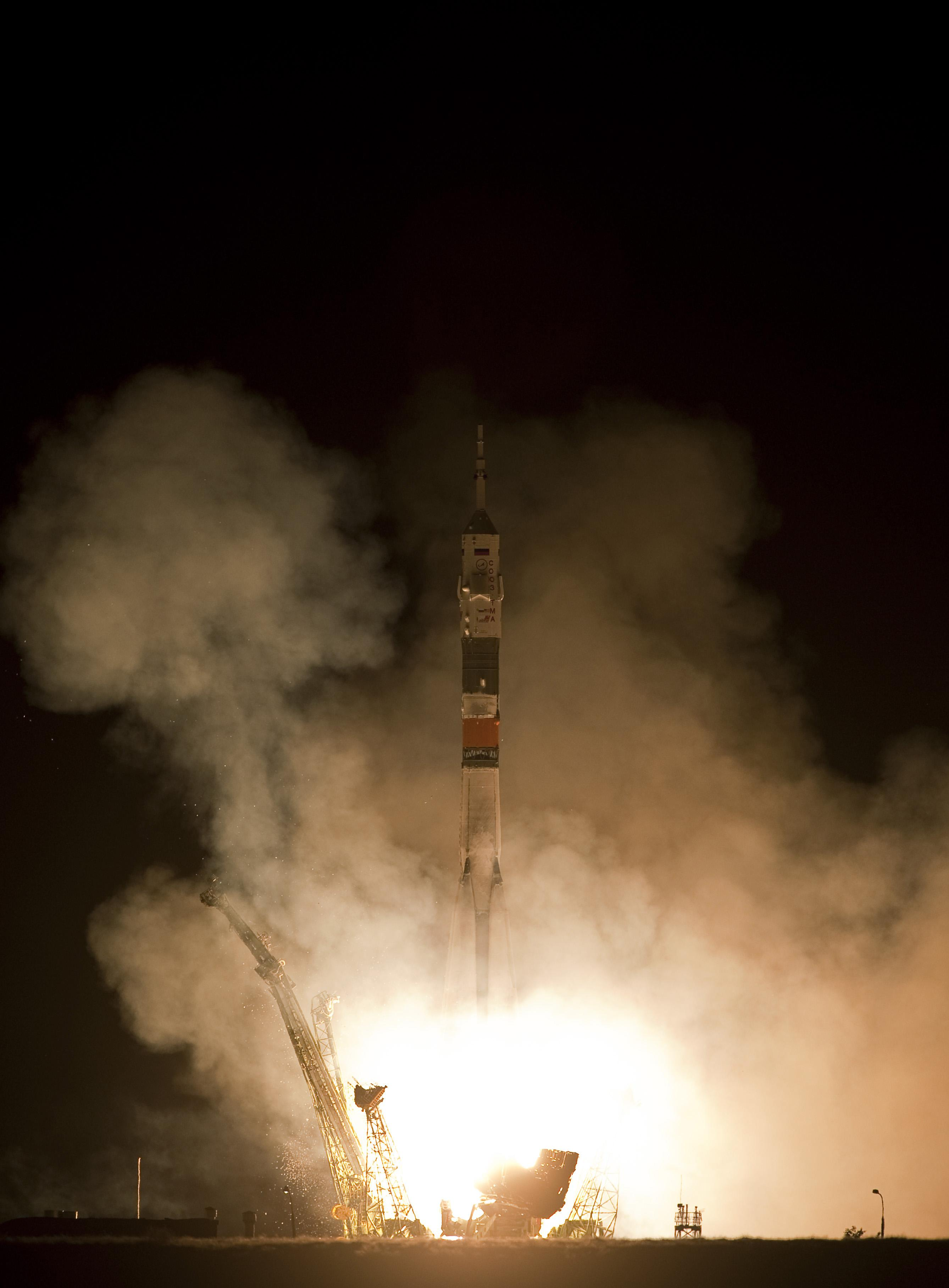
- A Soyuz-FG rocket launches Soyuz TMA-19 from the Baikonur Cosmodrome on 15 June 2010
- Mission type: Crewed mission to ISS
- Operator: Roscosmos
- COSPAR ID: 2010-029A
- SATCAT no.: 36603
- Mission duration: 164 days

Spacecraft properties
- Spacecraft type: Soyuz-TMA 11F732
- Manufacturer: Energia

Crew
- Crew size: 3
- Members: Fyodor Yurchikhin; Shannon Walker; Douglas H. Wheelock
- Callsign: Olympus

Start of mission
- Launch date: 15 June 2010, 21:35 UTC
- Rocket: Soyuz-FG
- Launch site: Baikonur, Site 1/5

End of mission
- Landing date: 26 November 2010, 04:46 UTC
- Landing site: 84 km from the city of Arkalyk.

Orbital parameters
- Reference system: Geocentric orbit
- Regime: Low Earth orbit
- Inclination: 51.62°

Docking with ISS
- Docking port: Zvezda aft
- Docking date: 17 June 2010; 22:25 UTC
- Undocking date: 28 June 2010; 19:13 UTC
- Time docked: 10 days, 20 hours and 48 minutes

Docking with ISS (Relocation)
- Docking port: Rassvet nadir
- Docking date: 28 June 2010; 19:38 UTC
- Undocking date: 26 November 2010; 01:19 UTC
- Time docked: 150 days, 5 hours and 41 minutes
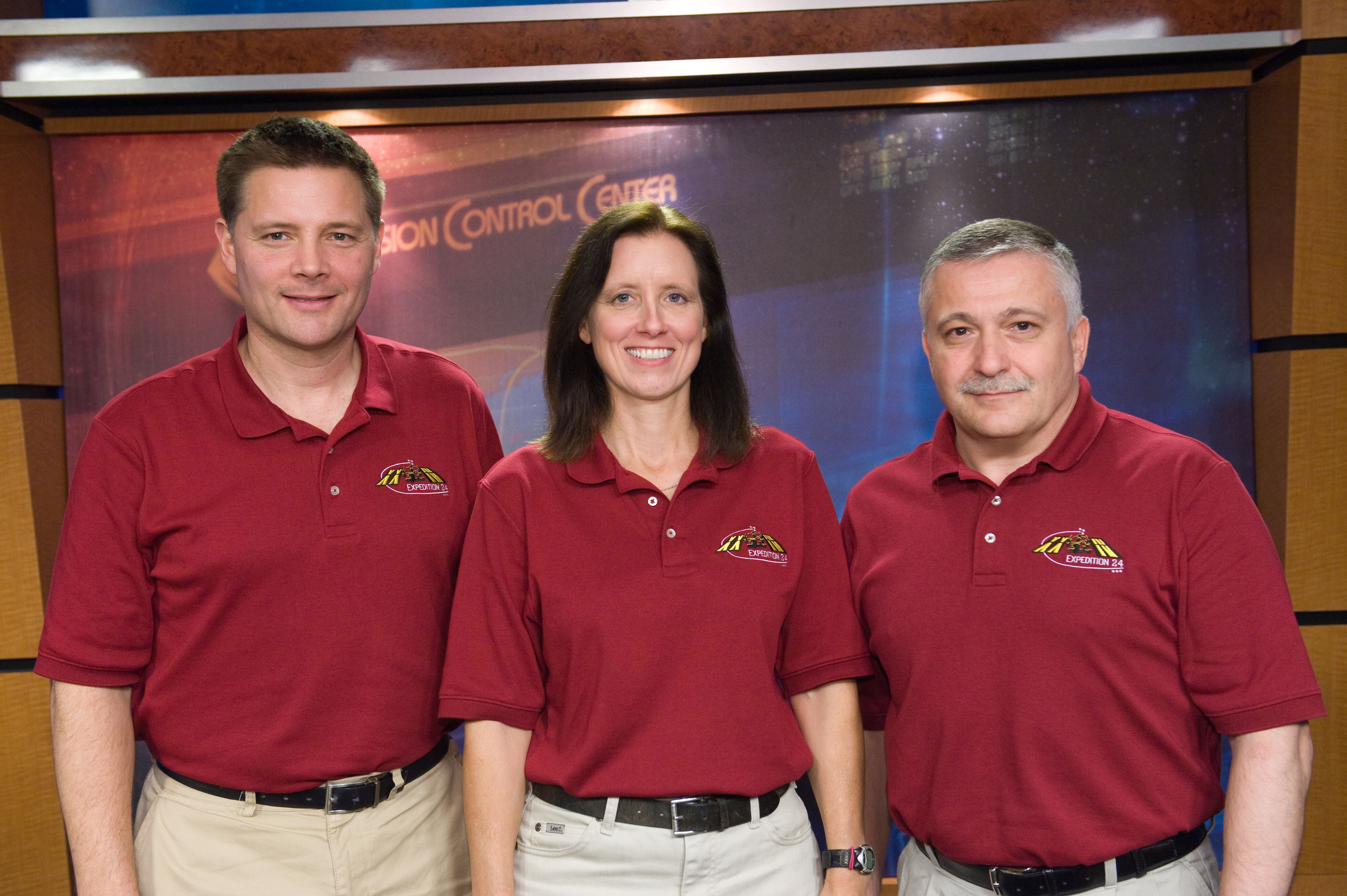
- From left to right: Wheelock, Walker and Yurchikhin Soyuz programme (Crewed missions)

Soyuz TMA-19 was a crewed spaceflight to the International Space Station (ISS) and is part of the Soyuz programme. It was launched on 15 June 2010 carrying three members of the Expedition 24 crew to the International Space Station, who remained aboard the station for around six months. Soyuz TMA-19 was the 106th crewed flight of a Soyuz spacecraft, since the first mission which was launched in 1967. The spacecraft remained docked to the space station for the remainder of Expedition 24, and for Expedition 25, to serve as an emergency escape vehicle. It undocked from ISS and landed in Kazakhstan on 26 November 2010. It was the 100th mission to be conducted as part of the International Space Station programme since assembly began in 1998.

== Crew ==
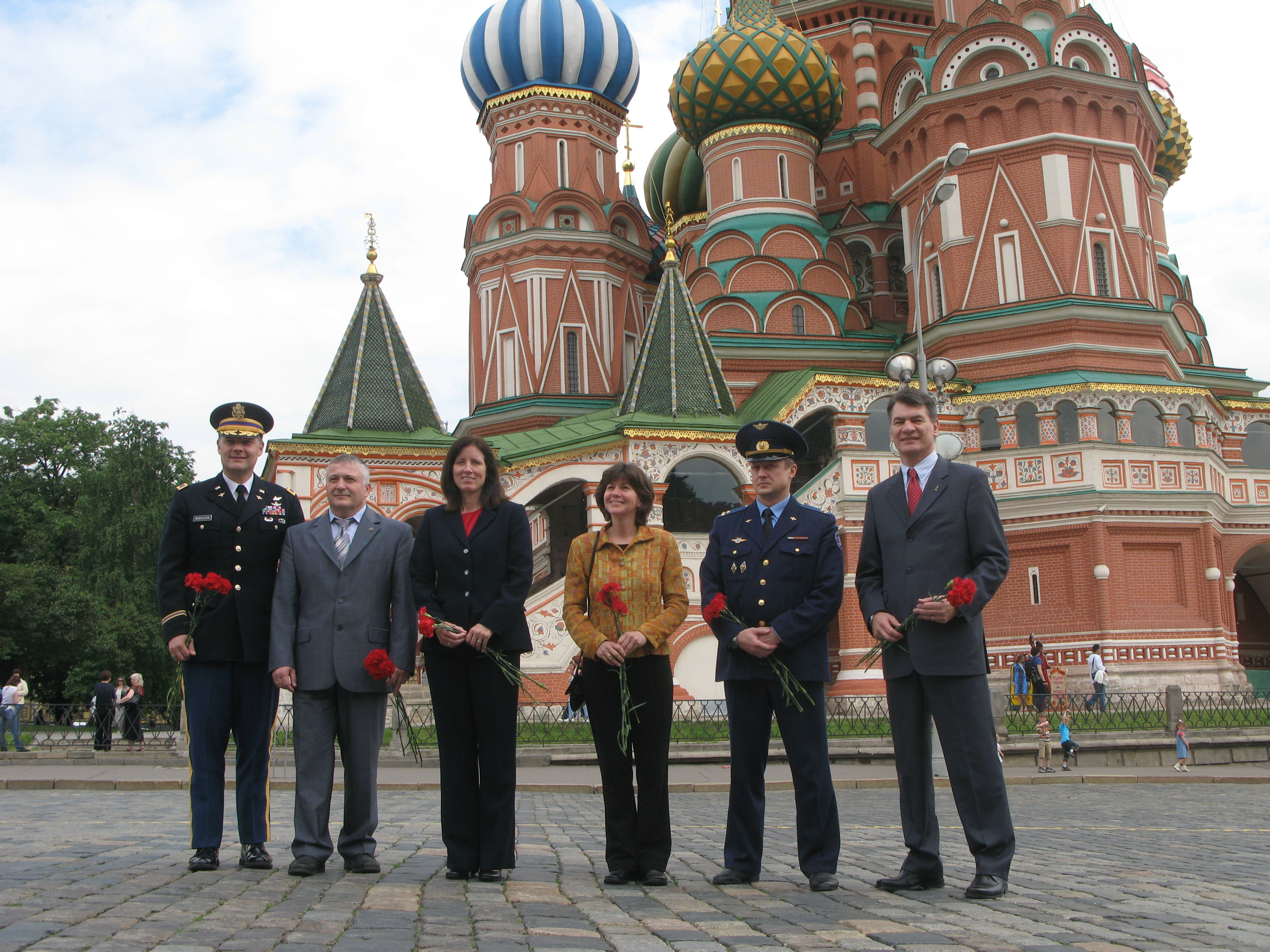
The Soyuz TMA-19 prime and backup crews on a ceremonial tour of Red Square on 31 May 2010.

The Soyuz TMA-19 crew was confirmed by NASA on 21 November 2008. The mission Commander is Fyodor Yurchikhin of the Roscosmos, who is making his third spaceflight. The other two crew members are Shannon Walker and Douglas H. Wheelock of the United States NASA and are designated flight engineers. Soyuz TMA-19 is Wheelock's second spaceflight, and Walker's first.

Position	Crew Member
Commander	(Russia) Fyodor Yurchikhin, Roscosmos; Expedition 24; Third spaceflight
Flight Engineer 1	(United States) Shannon Walker, NASA; Expedition 24; First spaceflight
Flight Engineer 2	(United States) Douglas H. Wheelock, NASA; Expedition 24; Second spaceflight

=== Backup crew ===
Position	Crew Member
Commander	(Russia) Dmitri Kondratyev, Roscosmos
Flight Engineer 1	(Italy) Paolo Nespoli, ESA
Flight Engineer 2	(United States) Catherine Coleman, NASA

== Launch ==
Soyuz TMA-19 was launched by a Soyuz-FG launch vehicle from Site 1/5 at the Baikonur Cosmodrome in Kazakhstan. The launch occurred successfully on 15 June 2010, with the rocket lifting off at 21:35 UTC. After its separation from the last stage of the Soyuz-FG rocket, Moscow Mission Control Center began controlling the Soyuz TMA-19 spacecraft. Nine minutes into the ascent, the spacecraft settled into a preliminary orbit of 200.16 by 259.16 km (124.37 by 161.03 mi) with the inclination 51.62° toward the equator. The Soyuz spacecraft successfully deployed the solar arrays for power generation and the antennas for navigational and communication systems. Telemetry data received from the Soyuz confirmed that the spacecraft was performing nominally.

Prior to launch, assembly of the rocket and spacecraft had been underway for several months. The Soyuz-FG rocket arrived at Baikonur on 11 March 2010, along with a Soyuz-U which was slated to launch Progress M-06M. The spacecraft itself was shipped from Korolyov on 16 April 2010, arriving at Baikonur by train three days later. Upon delivery, the spacecraft was moved to site 254.

On 11 June 2010, final inspections of the spacecraft were conducted, and the spacecraft was then encapsulated in its payload fairing to form the upper composite of the rocket. The next day, the upper composite was integrated with the upper stage of the rocket that was to launch it, and subsequently the launch escape system. This assembly work took place at Site 112 of the Baikonur Cosmodrome. Once this was complete, the upper stage was attached to the remainder of the rocket in the MIK. A State Commission met of 12 June 2010 to approve rollout, which was authorised.

Rollout to the launch pad began at 01:00 UTC on 13 June 2010, with the rocket departing the MIK propelled by a locomotive. Rollout lasted around two hours, with the rocket travelling 2 km (1.2 mi) from the MIK to the launch pad. The winner and runner-up in the patch design competition were present to observe the rollout. Rollout operations were completed by 05:00 UTC, when the rocket was erected on the launch pad.

== Docking ==
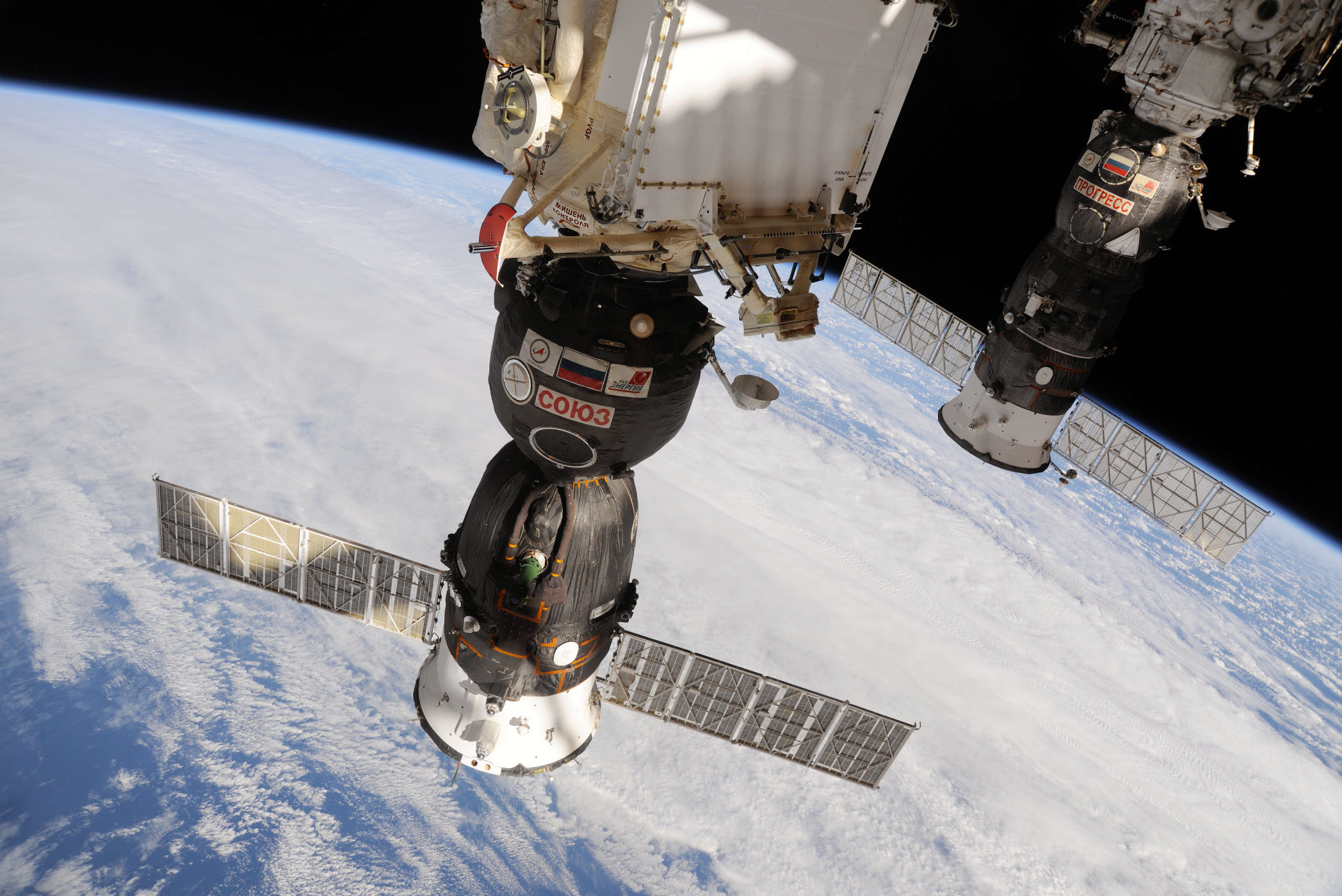
Soyuz TMA-19 spacecraft docked to Rassvet

Soyuz TMA-19 arrives at the ISS (16 m 32 s)

Soyuz TMA-19 docked with the International Space Station on 17 June 2010 at 22:25 UTC. It docked with the aft port of the Zvezda module. Ahead of docking, the ISS handed over attitude control to the Russian Orbital Segment at 19:00 UTC, and at 19:17 maneuvered to provide an optimum attitude for docking. At 20:06, the automated rendezvous sequence started. The Kurs docking systems aboard the Soyuz and the International Space Station were activated at 20:52 and 20:54 respectively. Soyuz TMA-19 began station keeping at around 20:08 UTC, before it commenced its final approach at 20:16.

Twenty minutes after docking, hooks were closed securing the Soyuz to the station. Once this was completed, the ISS returned to its normal attitude. Attitude control was returned to the US Orbital Segment at 23:45 UTC.

== Relocation ==
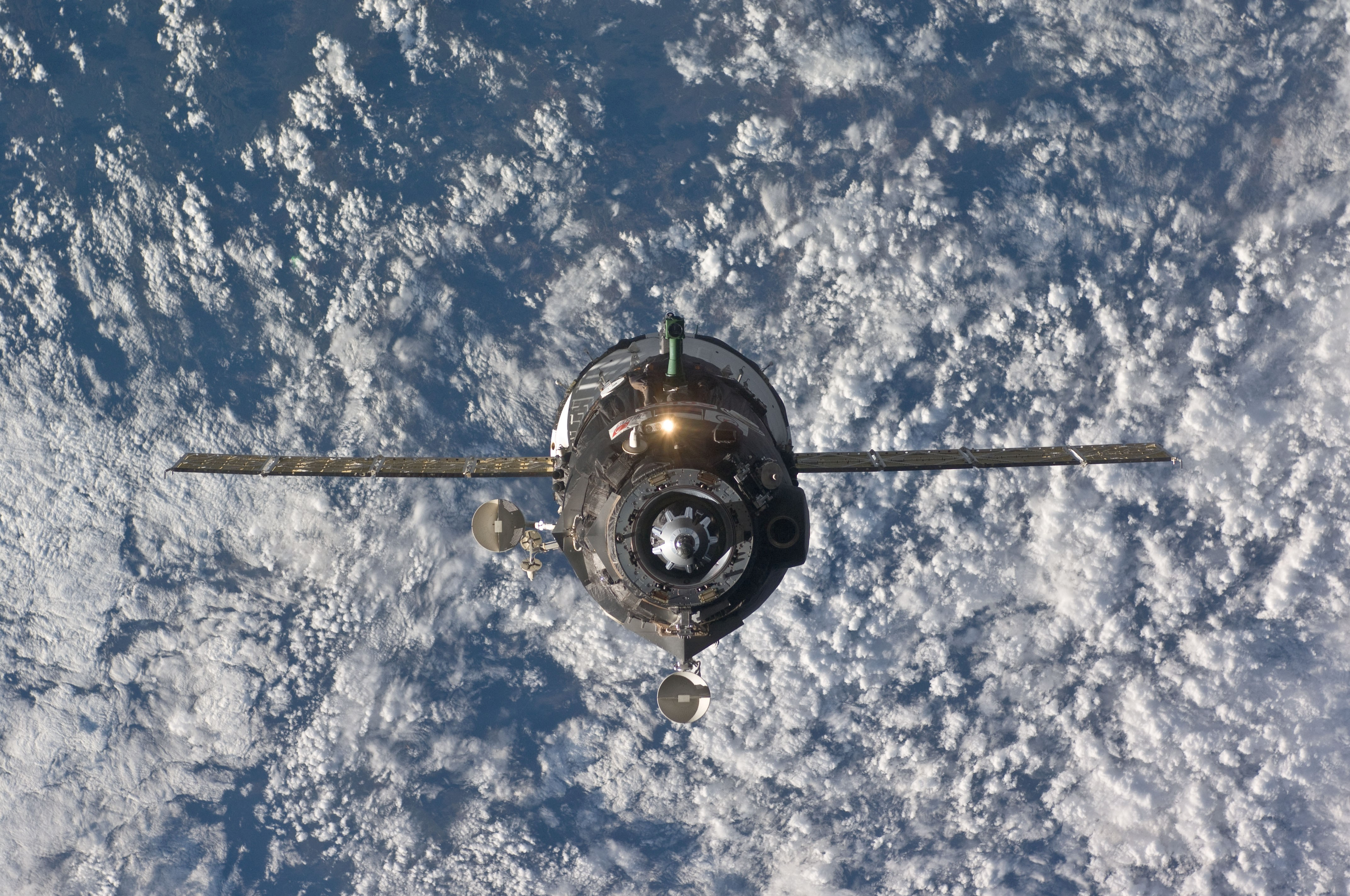
Soyuz TMA-19 relocates from the Zvezda Service Module's aft port to the Rassvet.

On 28 June 2010, cosmonaut Fyodor Yurchikhin along with NASA astronauts Douglas Wheelock and Shannon Walker boarded their Soyuz TMA-19 spacecraft and undocked from Zvezda Service Module's aft port at 07:13 UTC. They re docked it to its new location on the Rassvet module 25 minutes later as the two spacecraft were flying just off the coast of the Western Sahara on the west coast of Africa. The repositioning of the Soyuz TMA-19 was temporarily delayed due to an electrical breaker problem that delayed proper orientation of the 4B solar array on the space station's P4 truss. The flight went according to plan.

The event marked the first ever docking to the Rassvet module. The change of location released the Zvezda port for the docking of Progress M-06M.

== Undocking and landing ==
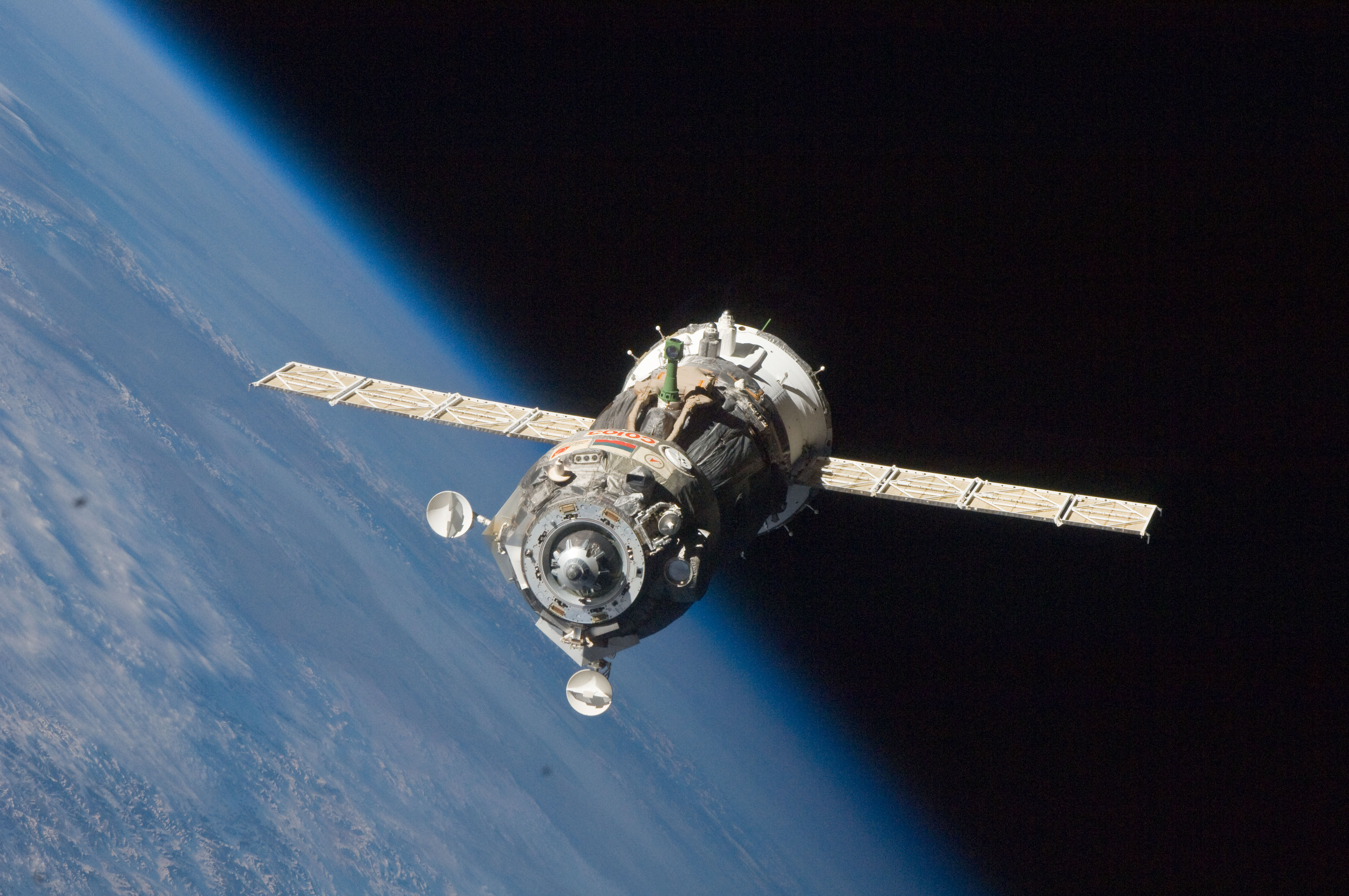
The Soyuz TMA-19 spacecraft departs the International Space Station.

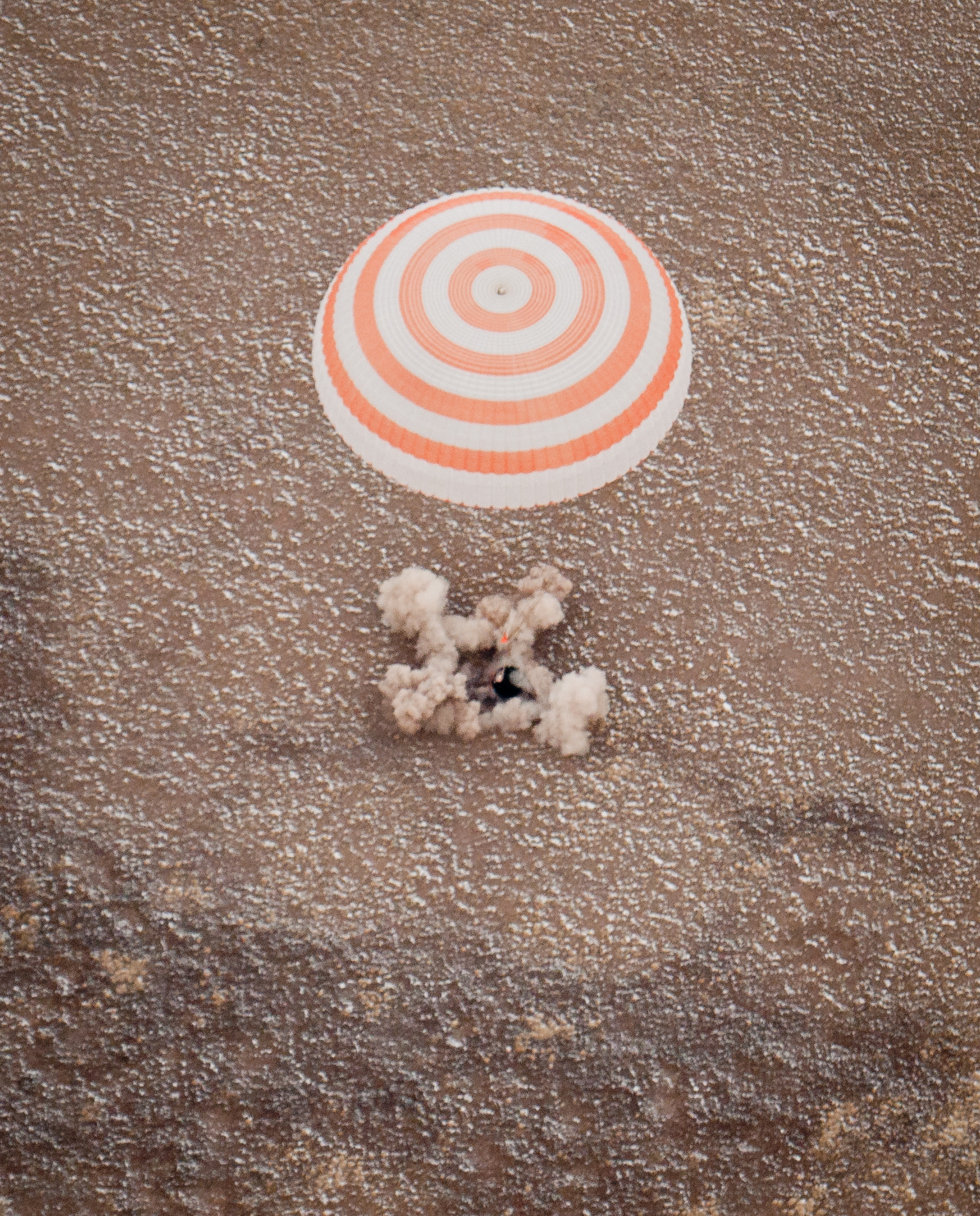
Soyuz TMA-19 lands in Kazakhstan on 26 November 2010.

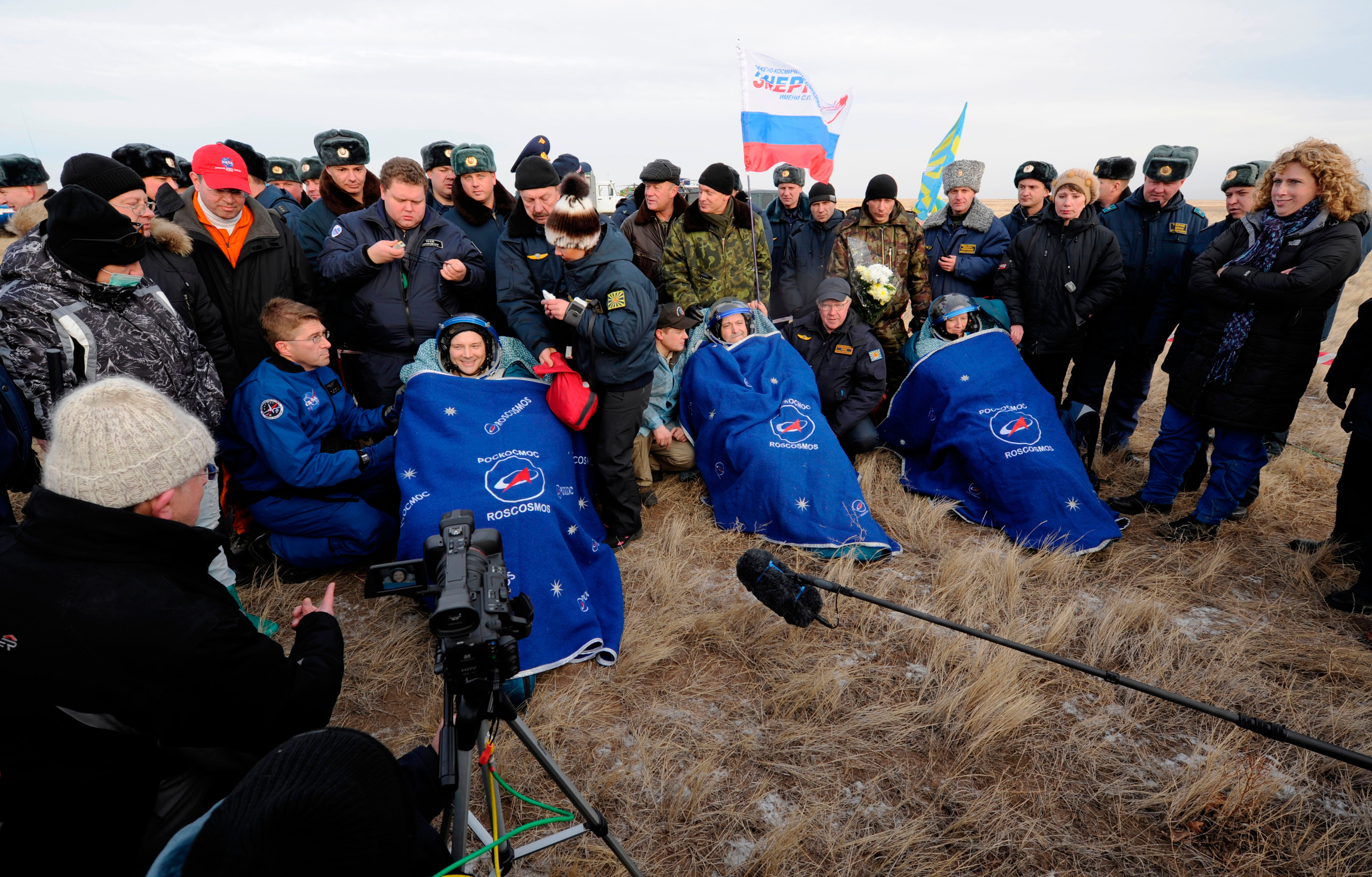
Soyuz TMA-19 crewmembers after landing.

Soyuz TMA-19 undocked from the space station at 01:19 UTC on 26 November 2010. The descent module landed on the central steppes of Kazakhstan at 04:46 UTC, four days earlier than originally planned. The landing had been set for 30 November 2010, but Kazakh officials decided to restrict air traffic before the start of the Organization for Security and Co-operation in Europe (OSCE) summit in Nur-Sultan (Astana), Kazakhstan, set for 1–2 December 2010. The landing site was located 84 km away from the city of Arkalyk.

On 25 November 2010, the crew boarded Soyuz TMA-19 to return to Earth. After closing the hatchway between the Soyuz and the station at 22:14 UTC, they donned their Sokol spacesuits and continued with the power up operations. The crew also activated the Soyuz systems and removed the docking clamps. The undock command was issued at 01:20 UTC when the Soyuz and the station was flying above the Russian-Mongolian border. The physical separation occurred three minutes later at 01:23:13 UTC.

After the separation from the station and at a short distance away, Soyuz TMA-19 executed the so-called "separation burn" (a 15 seconds burn) to vacate the proximity of the space station. About two and half hours later, at 03:55:12 UTC, the Soyuz spacecraft performed the deorbit maneuver which lasted for 4 minutes and 21 seconds, while it flew backwards over the south-central Atlantic Ocean on a north easterly trajectory towards Asia. With the deorbit burn nominally accomplished, the recovery forces comprising 14 helicopters, 4 airplanes and 7 search and rescue vehicles were dispatched to the landing zone. At an altitude of 140 kilometers, just above the first traces of the Earth's atmosphere, onboard computers commanded the separation of the three Soyuz TMA-19 modules. With the crew inside the Descent Module, the forward Orbital Module and the rear Instrumentation Module were pyrotechnically nominally jettisoned at 04:21 UTC. Three minutes after the separation, with the heat shield of the Descent Module pointing towards the direction of travel, the Soyuz capsule experienced the first traces of the atmosphere ("entry interface") at 04:23 UTC at an altitude of 120,000 m (390,000 ft) above the Earth. Around 04:28 UTC, the flight path of the capsule crossed the Mediterranean, Turkey and the Black Sea before flying over southern Russia and into Kazakhstan.

At an altitude of about 10 kilometers, onboard computers started a commanded sequence to unfurl the parachutes. Two "pilot" parachutes deployed first, extracting a 24-square-meter drogue parachute. The parachute deployment reduced the velocity of the Soyuz capsule from 230 m/s to 80 m/s and assisted in the capsule's stability by creating a gentle spin for the Soyuz spacecraft. Once the drogue chute was released, the main parachutes were deployed. They further reduced the descent to 7.2 m/s. Initially, the Descent Module hung underneath the main parachute at a 30° angle with respect to the horizon and for the few minutes before the landing, then following the detachment of the bottom-most harness it hung vertically. At this time, flight controllers reported the Soyuz spacecraft was operating as expected on the automatic sequence. During the same time, they were successful in contacting the crew via the fixed-wing aircraft that served as the central command for the search and recovery forces. The recovery forces spotted the Soyuz TMA-19 around 04:36 UTC. At an altitude of five kilometers, the module's heat shield was jettisoned.

At the end of the 164-day voyage, Soyuz TMA-19's landing was confirmed at 04:46 UTC. The recovery team assisted the crew to exit the capsule. First out of the capsule was cosmonaut Fyodor Yurchikhin followed by NASA astronauts Shannon Walker and Douglas Wheelock.

After the successful landing, the Soyuz TMA-19 crew flew to Kostanay in Kazakhstan for the welcoming ceremony. Wheelock and Walker boarded a NASA jet waiting for them in Kostanay for the trip back to the Johnson Space Center in Houston, Texas. Yurchikhin headed for Star City – the home of the Yuri Gagarin Cosmonaut Training Center in Russia.

== Mission insignia ==
The Soyuz TMA-19 patch design is based on a drawing by Evgeny Emelianov, the winner of the traditional patch contest organized by the Russian Federal Space Agency. His design shows the ISS and the Earth waiting for the crew to come back.
