= Progress M-06M =

Russian spacecraft

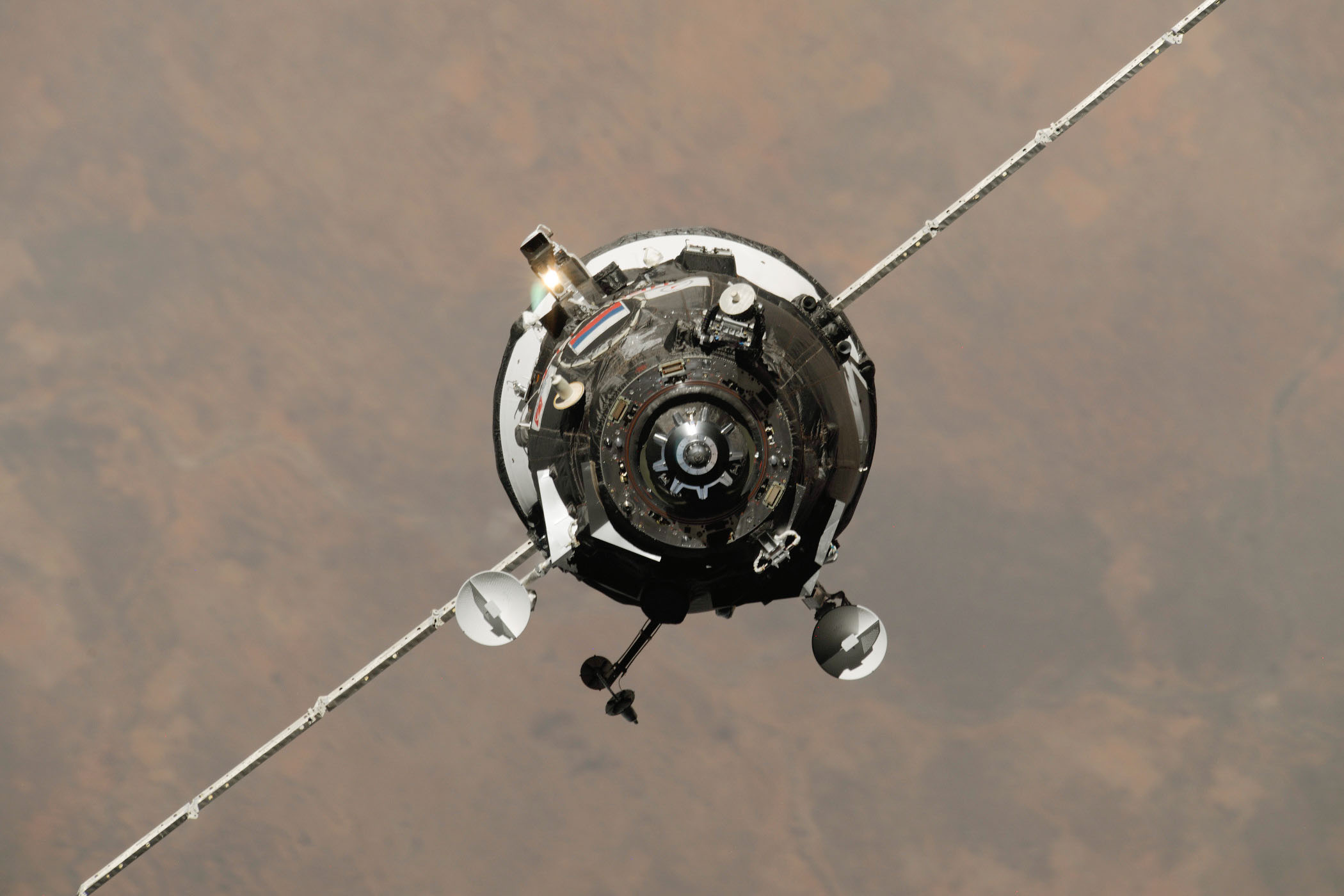
- Progress M-06M approaches the space station on 4 July 2010.
- Mission type: ISS resupply
- Operator: Roskosmos
- COSPAR ID: 2010-033A
- SATCAT no.: 36748
- Mission duration: 68 days

Spacecraft properties
- Spacecraft type: Progress-M s/n 406
- Manufacturer: RKK Energia

Start of mission
- Launch date: 30 June 2010, 15:35:00 UTC
- Rocket: Soyuz-U
- Launch site: Baikonur, Site 1/5

End of mission
- Disposal: Deorbited
- Decay date: 6 September 2010

Orbital parameters
- Reference system: Geocentric
- Regime: Low Earth
- Inclination: 51.6°
- Epoch: 30 June 2019

Docking with ISS
- Docking port: Zvezda
- Docking date: 4 July 2010, 16:17 UTC
- Undocking date: 31 August 2010, 11:25 UTC
- Time docked: 58 days

Cargo
- Pressurised: 1210 kg (equipment)
- Fuel: 870 kg
- Gaseous: 50 kg (oxygen and air)
- Water: 100 kg
- Progress ISS Resupply

Progress M-06M (Russian: Прогресс М-06М), identified by NASA as Progress 38P, is a Russian Progress spacecraft which was launched in June 2010 to resupply the International Space Station. It was the 38th Progress to dock with the space station and the third of year 2010.

== Launch ==
The Soyuz-U rocket used to launch the Progress M-06M spacecraft was delivered to the Baikonur Cosmodrome in early March 2010. The rocket was manufactured by TsSKB-Progress at Samara.

The Progress was launched successfully on 30 June 2010 at 15:35:00 UTC. The cargo ship was loaded with 870 kilograms (1,920 lb) of propellant, 50 kilograms (110 lb) of oxygen and air, 100 kilograms (220 lb) of water and 1,210 kilograms (2,670 lb) of equipment, spare parts and experiment hardware.

The spacecraft reached a preliminary orbit of 193 by 241 kilometres (120 by 150 mi). A series of precise engine firings over two days guided the craft towards a docking with the International Space Station's aft Zvezda port originally scheduled for 2 July.

== First docking ==
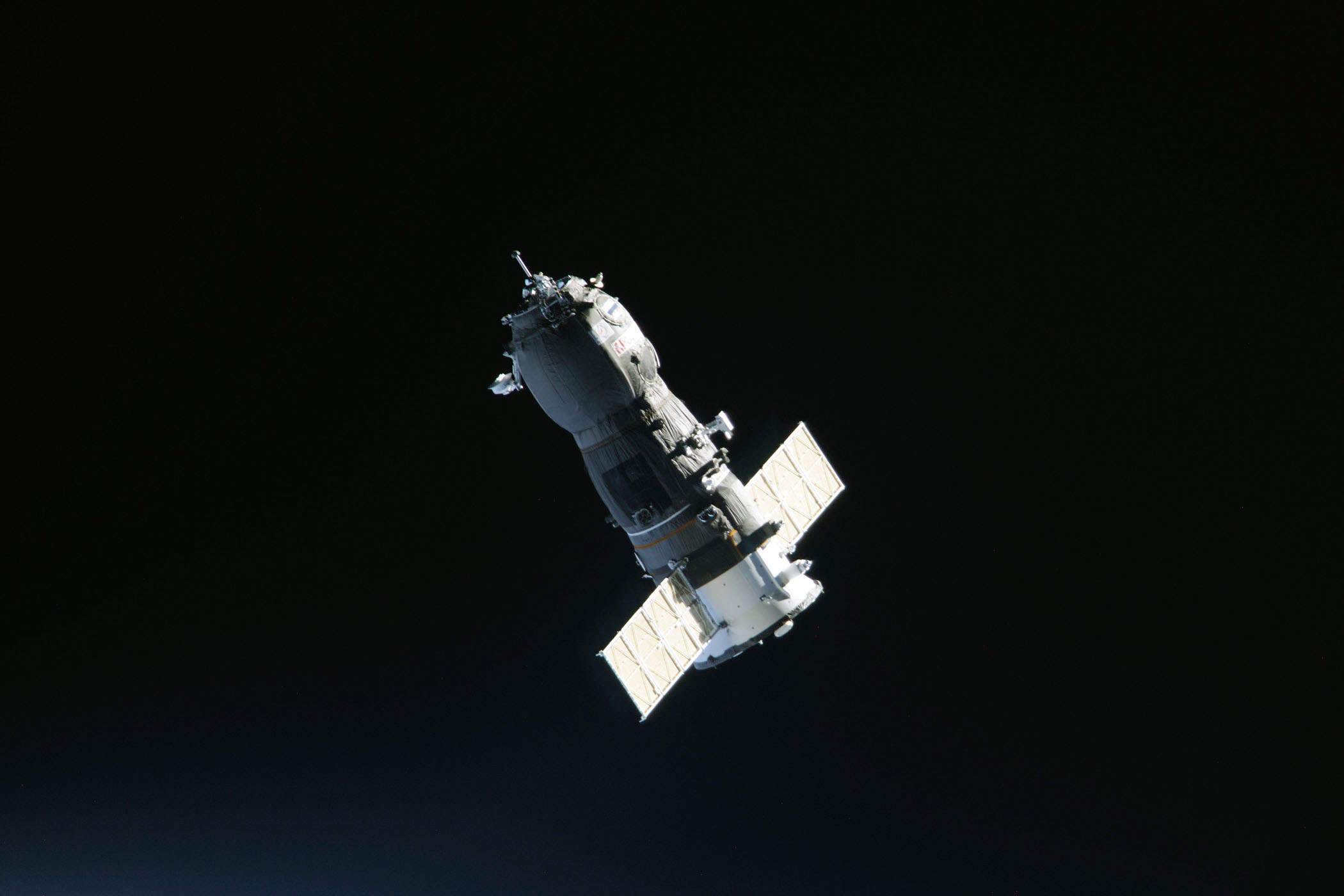
Progress spacecraft approaches the ISS during the aborted docking attempt on 2 July 2010.

While approaching the ISS on 2 July 2010, the spacecraft aborted the docking procedure after a critical communications error. The spacecraft bypassed the station at a safe distance. According to the official statement of the Moscow mission control, the approach to the ISS went normally until the distance of around 2 kilometres (1.2 mi) when the ship's KURS automated rendezvous system issued a command prohibiting further "dynamic operations". The telemetry between the spacecraft and the ISS was lost about 25 minutes before planned docking. According to NASA, the most likely cause of the aborted docking was traced to the activation of the TORU "Klest" TV transmitter, which created interference with TORU manual rendezvous system, causing a loss of the TORU command link between spacecraft and the ISS that triggered the abort of the Progress docking. The Russian flight control team later confirmed that the KURS system operated normally during the aborted docking attempt and did not fail, as was initially believed.

A RKK Energia accident commission completed an investigation into the docking failure and concluded that a "dynamical mode abort" command in the spacecraft's backup manual approach control loop had caused the anomaly. The command was generated because of interference in the TORU metric wave signal link and pressed button "Operation" on the TORU panel in the space station's Zvezda module.

== Docking ==
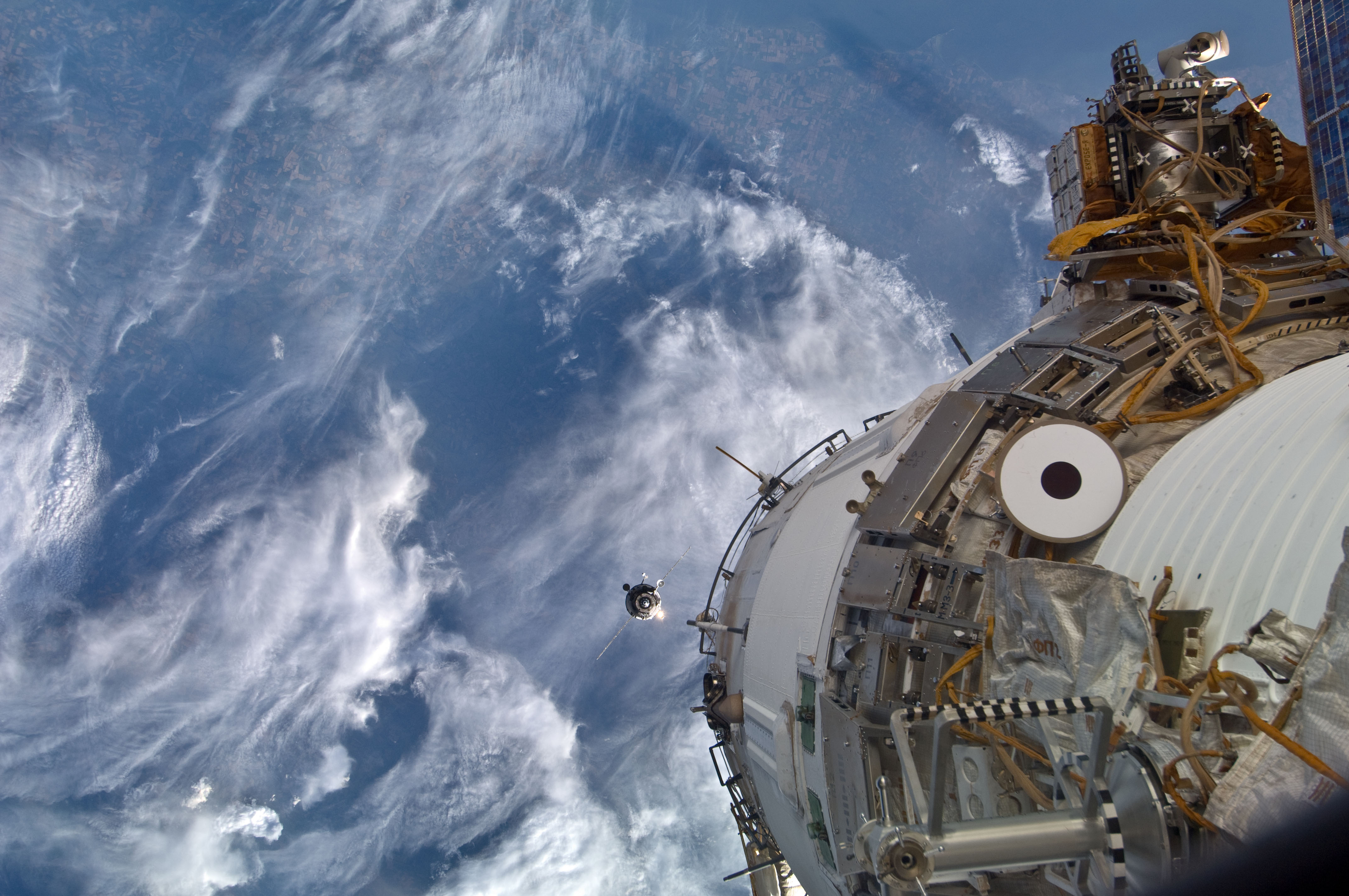
Progress M-06M approaches the ISS again for a successful docking.

Shortly after the abort, the situation was evaluated and a second attempt at docking on 4 July 2010 was planned and subsequently succeeded.

Flying on autopilot using the KURS automated system, the spacecraft docked to the aft docking port of Zvezda. The Expedition 24 crew members monitored the arrival of the spacecraft and as a precautionary measure TORU was not activated for the second attempt. The docking occurred over four-corner border of Russia, Kazakhstan, China and Mongolia. Hooks and latches were engaged a few minutes later and the crew members entered the Progress around 19:30 UTC.

== ISS reboost ==
An ISS reboost assisted by the attitude thrusters of Progress M-06M was initiated on 16 July 2010 to improve conditions for the landing of Soyuz TMA-18 and the docking of Progress M-07M. Following the commands from the space station Russian Segment Central Computer, the engines of the Progress M-06M spacecraft were started at 06:42:30 UTC. The operation lasted 1065 seconds raised the orbit of the space station by 3.7 km to 355.2 km.

== Undocking and deorbit ==
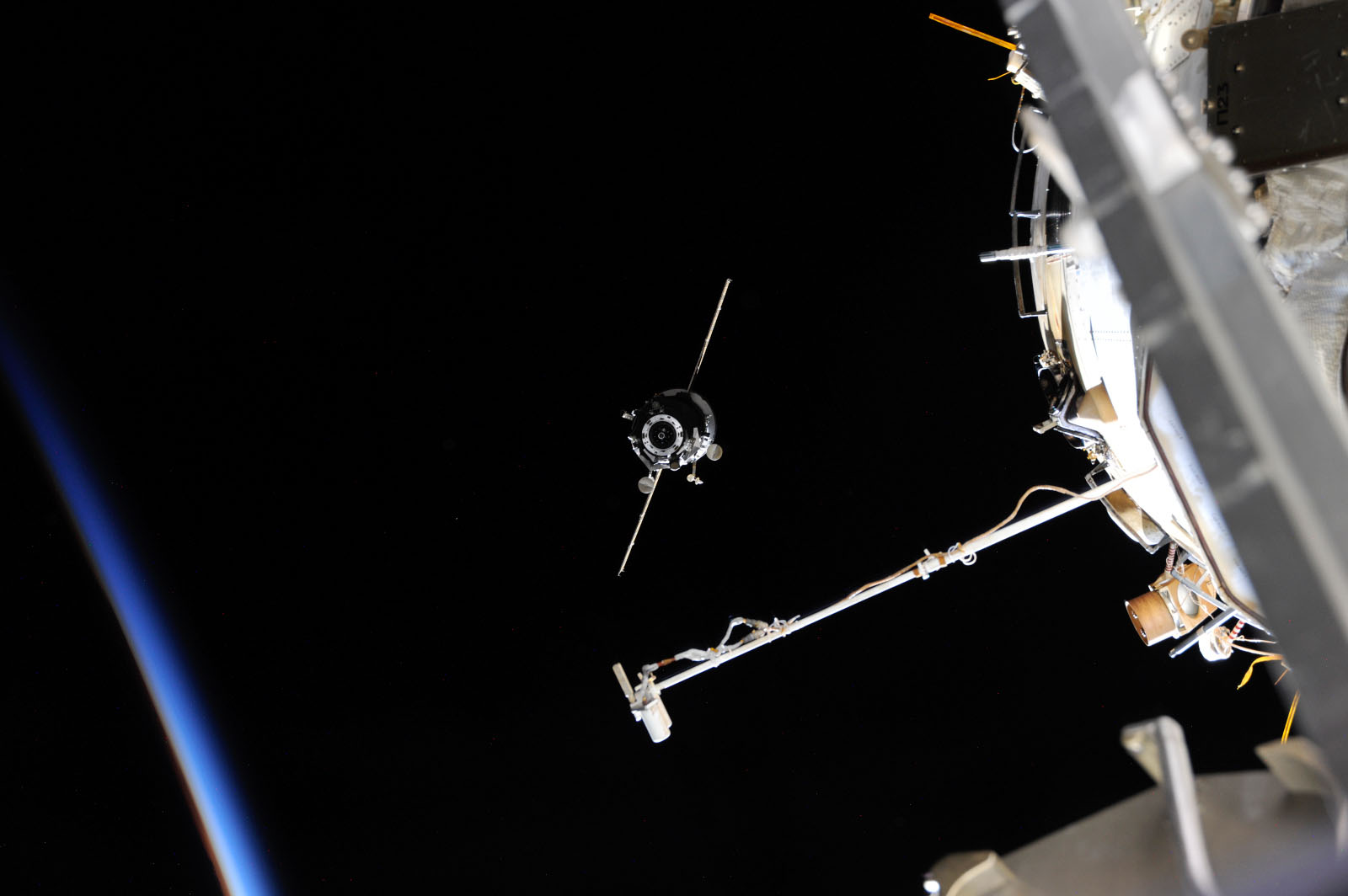
Progress M-06M seen shortly after undocking from the ISS.

The Progress M-06M spacecraft loaded with trash and other items for disposal, undocked from the International Space Station at 11:25 UTC on 31 August 2010. This was slightly behind schedule: the command for the spacecraft to undock was intended to have been issued from the ISS at 11:19 UTC, resulting in undocking three minutes later.

Following undocking, Progress M-06M remained in orbit to conduct an experiment designation Radar-Progress. It was deorbited over the Pacific Ocean on 6 September 2010, with debris falling into an area known as the spacecraft cemetery. The retroburn was initiated at 16:13:50 Moscow time and the remaining parts of the Progress, which had not burnt during the reentry, fell down in the area of 42°07' South, 138°25' West at about 16:53 Moscow time.
