= Cape Romano =

Geographic feature in Florida

Coordinates: 25°50′43″N 81°40′43″W

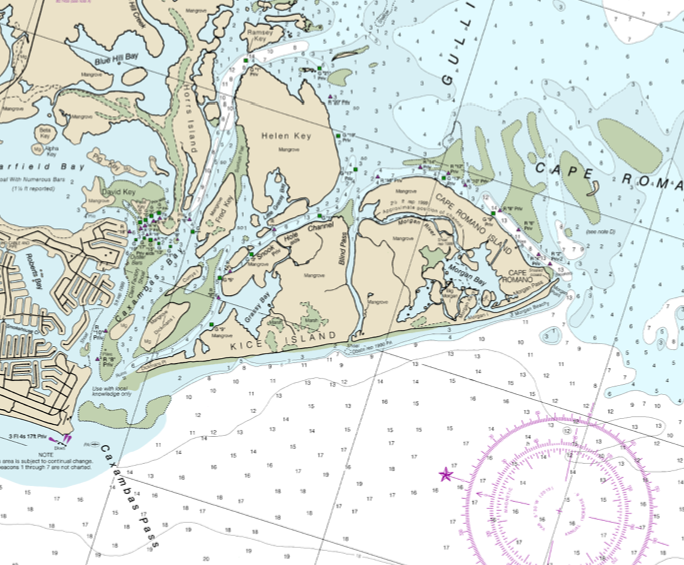
Chart of Kice, Morgan, and Cape Romano islands, with Cape Romano on the South (right) end

Cape Romano is a cape on the Gulf Coast of Florida, United States. It is on Cape Romano Island, one of a group of islands known collectively as Kice-Morgan Island.

Marjory Stoneman Douglas stated that the cape was named for Bernard Romans, who charted all of the coasts of East and West Florida in 1774. The feature is called "Cape Roman or Punta Larga" on Romans's 1774 map. John Lee Williams, in 1837, refers to the south point of "Isle Roman" as "Cape Roman" "of the British [charts]", and "Puerta Longa", "Punta Longa", and "Cape Acies" "of the Spanish charts".

== Kice-Morgan Island ==
Kice-Morgan Island is located south of Marco Island, in Collier County. It is separated from Marco Island by Caxambas Bay. John Lee Williams called the island south of Caxambas Bay "Isle Roman", and described it as 15 miles (24 km) long and 10 to 12 miles (16 to 19 km) wide. The island complex consists of narrow barrier beaches with large mangrove mangals (forests) behind the beaches. The Kice Island barrier beach was 2.5 miles (4.0 km) long in 1976, extending southsouthwest from Caxamabas Pass and Bay. Hurricane Wilma made landfall near Cape Romano in 2005, bringing a 10-foot (3.0 m) storm surge onto Kice Island. The storm opened an inlet, Morgan Pass, in the middle of the island. The southern portion of Kice Island is now called Morgan Island. In the decade following Hurricane Wilma, much of the beach on Morgan Island was eroded away. Some sand from the Kice-Morgan beaches has moved south, forming a spit at the southern end of Morgan Island. Other sand from the Kice-Morgan beaches has moved further south, onto the Cape Romano shoals south of the cape. As of 2023, the NOAA chart shows Cape Romano on Cape Romano Island, which lies behind the Morgan Island beach. The sand spit at the southern end of Morgan Island extends further south than Cape Romano Island.

== Human presence ==
The town of Muspa, a sub-chiefdom of the Calusa, may have been located on or near Cape Romano. One Spanish map gave the name "Punta de Muspa" to the cape, and descriptions of the location of the town fit the cape, as well. John Lee Williams reported plantations in the vicinity of Caxambas Bay in 1837, which led Charlton Tebeau to suggest there may have been one at Cape Romano. A military expedition in 1838 camped on Cape Romano at the site of a former settlement, where they found fresh water. The cape was later reported to have a reliable fresh water well, which was used by residents of the area. Joe Dickman lived on Cape Romano as a hermit from the 1930s until the 1960s. Several houses were built on or near Cape Romano in the 1970s and 1980s, but beach erosion left them in open water, and hurricanes have washed them away, including the Cape Romano Dome House.
