= XEPLE-AM =

Radio Chiapas station in Palenque, Chiapas

- Palenque, Chiapas, Mexico; Mexico
- Broadcast area: Palenque, Chiapas
- Frequency: 1040 AM
- Branding: Radio Palenque

Programming
- Format: Public radio

Ownership
- Owner: Government of the State of Chiapas

History
- First air date: June 23, 1991
- Call sign meaning: PaLenquE

Technical information
- Power: 5 kW day/0.5 kW night
- Transmitter coordinates: 17°32′40″N 91°59′11″W

Links
- Website: Radio Palenque

XEPLE-AM is a radio station on 1040 AM in Palenque, Chiapas in Mexico. It is part of the state-owned Radio Chiapas state network and is known as Radio Palenque.

XEPLE signed on June 23, 1991.
