= Cape Romano Dome House =

Submerged offshore house in Florida, US

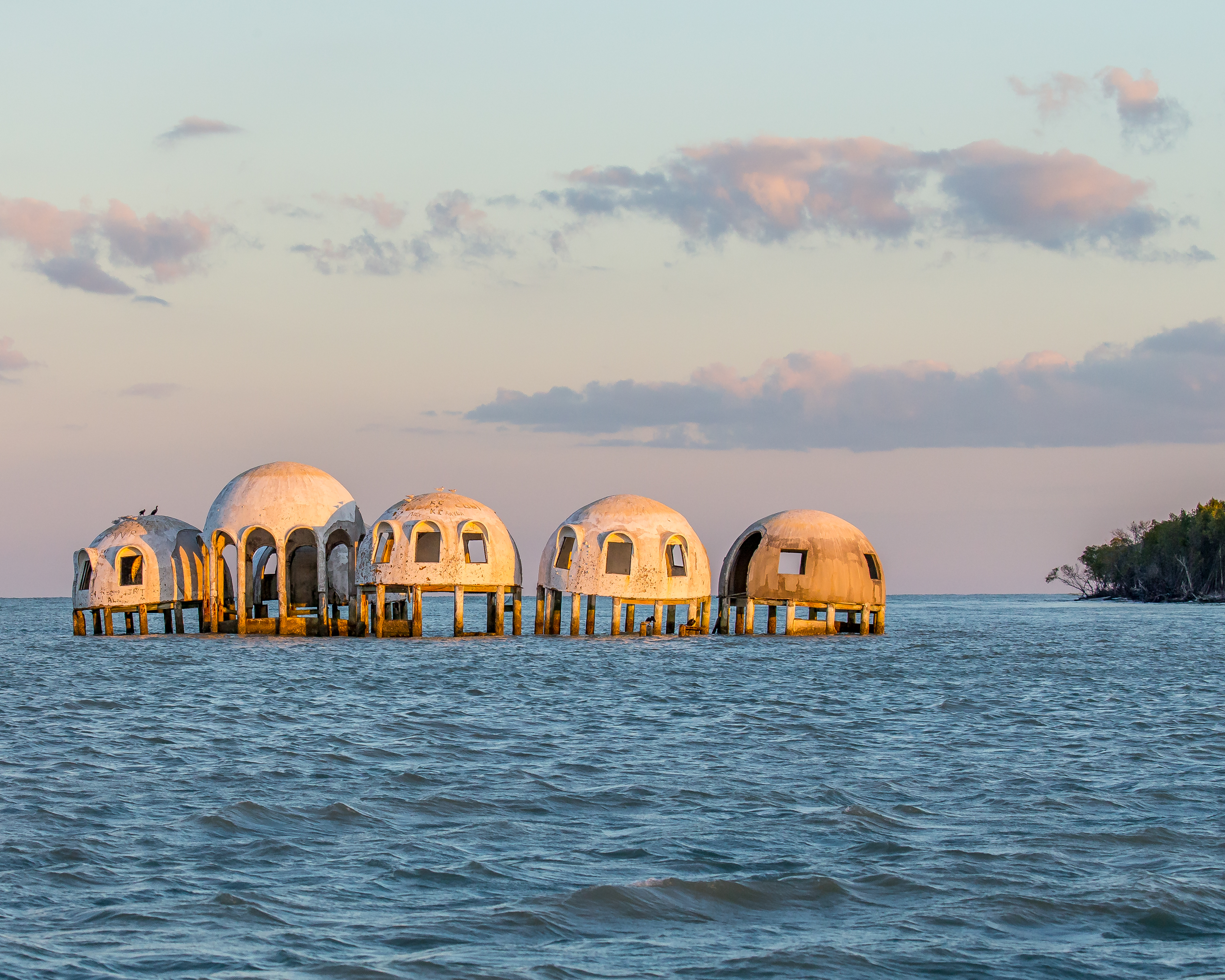
- The Dome House in 2016
- Interactive map of the Cape Romano Dome House area

General information
- Status: Submerged underwater
- Location: Cape Romano, Florida, United States
- Coordinates: 25°50′43″N 81°40′52″W
- Construction started: 1980
- Completed: 1982
- Destroyed: September 28, 2022
- Owner: Florida Department of Environmental Protection (FDEP)

Technical details
- Floor area: 2,400 sq ft (220 m^{2})

The Cape Romano Dome House was a structure consisting of six dome-shaped modules on stilts, originally built on an islet located approximately 300 feet (91 m) offshore from Cape Romano Island, south of Marco Island, in the Ten Thousand Islands of Collier County, Florida. Cape Romano Dome house was built in 1982 by retired independent oil producer Bob Lee. The home changed ownership several times, with the most recent ownership by the state of Florida since 2018. The islet was gradually eroded by successive hurricanes, and on September 28, 2022, the remaining structures above water collapsed due to Hurricane Ian.

== History ==
=== Construction and period in use ===
Bob Lee, a retired oil producer, spent much of the years 1978 and 1979 surveying and purchasing land on Morgan Island in hopes of constructing a vacation home. He eventually purchased four adjacent plots of land for his project.

In 1980, Lee began constructing the home, a white-painted concrete structure. He purchased a barge to transport supplies for the building. The house consisted of six stout, interconnected dome structures, which made up the rooms of the house, and some of which had two levels. It was 2,400 square feet (220 m^{2}) and featured three bedrooms and three bathrooms. Lee's daughter Jane Maples recalled the construction:

Building it was the fun part for my dad, but he also loved the seclusion of living on the island; fishing, shelling and watching the weather. He loved inventing things. He invented a heat source for under the floors of our house and had an invention that would bring logs in and drop them on the fireplace that came through the wall of our den. Kids loved him. He was just fun to be around; a really adventurous guy way before his time.

She also recalled to Florida Weekly:

My dad thought the corners of rooms were wasted space as were the corners of the ceiling. He thought the dome ceiling gave the feeling of openness. He was right. The rooms felt very large and open.

Before erecting the Cape Romano structure, he built a full-scale model on land he owned in Gatlinburg, Tennessee. The Tennessee dome house is still standing. Lee was known for engaging in his own projects, and designed the house to run on solar power and be self-sustaining. The concrete walls were made out of sand from the island. Gutters were installed which drained rainwater into a large tank, which purified the water, and then pumped it into all the home's sinks, baths and showers, and water-consuming appliances. The house's domes were not only aesthetic but practical as well; their sturdy concrete walls and rounded tops providing superior hurricane protection. The house was completed in 1982 The floors were tile and carpet, the walls painted white, and the rooms had large windows on all sides. Mike Morgan, Bob Lee's grandson, said about the house's sustainability:

My grandfather designed it so that when the rain would hit the domes, all the rainwater and the morning dew would wash down into a gutter system that he built around the domes. That would all lead into a 23,000 gallon cistern under the center dome. The water would run through filters and that's what we would use for showers and dishwashing; things like that. The house was totally self-sustaining. He had several solar panels for power along with backup generators if it was cloudy for several days. The solar systems were installed by Dell Jones, a solar contractor in Fort Myers. The Amcor Solon 120 liter thermosyphon solar water heater provided the hot water, the photovoltaic system was a hybrid system with a gasoline generator, a large 24 volt lead acid battery with hydro caps (catalytic converters) and Arco solar modules. The refrigerator was a SunFrost high efficiency refrigerator run by the 24 volt battery bank. The inverter was a combination of the older Vanner and a new Trace Engineering inverter installed by Dell. In addition upgrading the appliance loads, Dell installed the new lighting, which at the time was state-of-the-art, compact fluorescent lamps.

The home originally was built as a vacation house for Bob Lee, his wife Margaret and their children, including daughter Jane. Jane Maples, née Lee, told Coastal Breeze News about the local attention and controversy the house attracted during its early years.

I can remember one time we went to the drug store on Marco and some people in the row behind me were saying ‘Have you been by those dome houses?' And the other one said ‘Yeah, but I hear they guard that with machine guns!' Somehow it got a reputation of being a scary place.

Two years after its completion in 1984, the Lees sold the house to another family. After that family's financial situation declined, the Lees repossessed the home in 1987, after which point it became the family's primary residence. Bob and Margaret Lee lived there as well as Jane, their adult daughter and Jane's daughter. Mike Morgan, their grandson, lived there during the early 1990s. Jane remembered those years:

My daughter turned one while we were living there. [Back then], it was totally different. There were two other homes; one on stilts and a pyramid-shaped house. They had horses, dogs and turkeys. How they got a horse out there, I'll never know!

They renovated the interior and stayed there until 1992. That year was marked by Hurricane Andrew, which left barely a scratch on the sturdy home's walls and foundations, but utterly destroyed the interior. Mike Morgan, the grandson, noted:

Andrew didn't do a ton of damage, really. The main structure's design is very high wind resistant because there's no sharp edges or flat surfaces for the wind to catch on. That was another thought process that my grandfather had when he built them. But the windows, obviously were not, so that was the main damage.

Before the storm, there were three homes on Morgan Island, including the Lee residence. The other two, one, a house on stilts, and the other, a pyramid house, fared worse in the hurricane. Neither are standing. The Lee family abandoned the home in 1992 as it was no longer habitable.

=== Later history ===
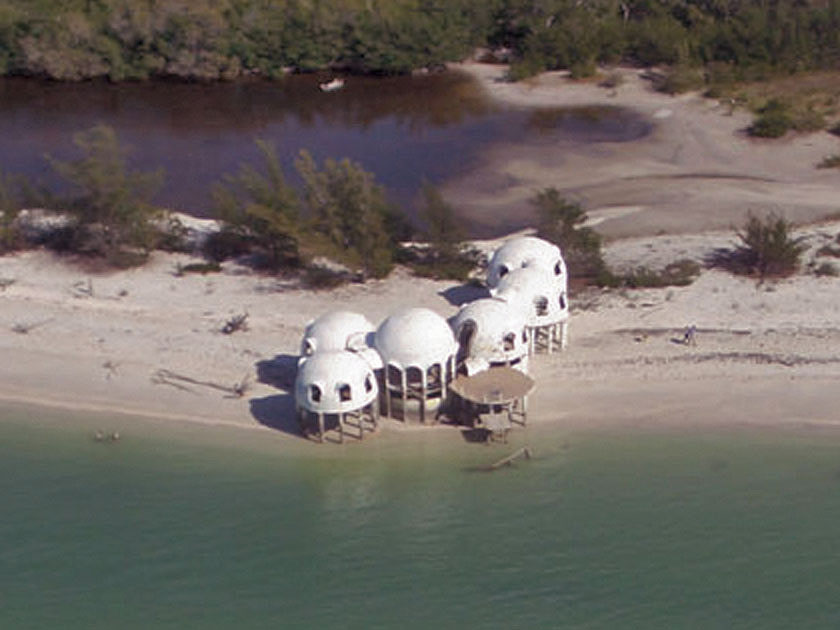
House seen from the air circa 2004

By 2004, water levels began to meet the concrete pillars holding up the home. In 2005, Bob Lee sold the house to John Tosto, a Naples resident, for $300,000. Tosto intended to renovate the home, and Lee advised him to construct a sea wall to end the erosion that had been ebbing away at the island for years. Tosto decided against this, and instead hoped to move it, using a crane, from its current location to a higher piece of land on the island on high concrete pillars. He estimated the project to take three or four months.

A few months after purchasing the property, Hurricane Wilma struck, eroding the coastline and destabilizing the house's foundation. Tosto boarded the home's window openings and continued with his effort to move the house. He faced many regulatory bodies, including the U.S. Army Corps of Engineers, the Department of Environmental Protection and the Collier County Code Building and Enforcement Departments. He was unable to produce all of the necessary permits, partially due to the hindrance of protected bird nesting seasons.

In 2007, the Collier County Code Enforcement Board ordered the structure to be demolished by the owners within two years because it was unsafe. Tosto had presented an engineer's certification stating that the house was reparable at the time, but the board still voted against him, citing his lack of proactive measures to protect the house in the past. In November 2009, he was fined $187,000 for not having the house demolished by the proper time. The county offered to drop the fine if Tosto completed the demolition. By 2009, he had invested $500,000 in the project and his estimates put the cost of completion at $900,000. At that time, the house's foundational pillars were permanently underwater. The house officially was abandoned, with occasional visits by teenagers and fishermen. The demolition never occurred.

In 2013, Florida Weekly reporter Cynthia Mott wrote in an article that while snorkeling at the site, she discovered the ruins now served as a reef, with diverse marine life. She remarked as follows:

I've snorkeled Grand Cayman, Mexico and Fiji, yet have never witnessed a more diverse, crowded concentration of undersea life than what has taken up residence under the remnants of those domes. It was as if all the fish and rays living along that part of the Collier County coast decided to hang out in one location. To make the sight even more remarkable, swirling like iridescent tornado clouds around the gathering were millions of shimmering, silver baitfish.

In 2015, a movement was started to move the domes deeper to a location where they could safely become an underwater reef as part of Florida's history, but the movement did not get funded.

After Hurricane Irma hit the area in September 2017 as a Category 3 storm, two of the westernmost domes collapsed into the ocean, leaving four standing.

In 2018, the Collier County Code Enforcement division closed the case on the domes and ownership transferred to the state.

On September 28, 2022, Hurricane Ian destroyed the remaining domes. Only some of the pilings still stand above water.

== See also ==
- Stiltsville
