= Stiltsville =

Group of wood stilt houses located one mile south of Cape Florida

Coordinates: 25.6535°N 80.1715°W

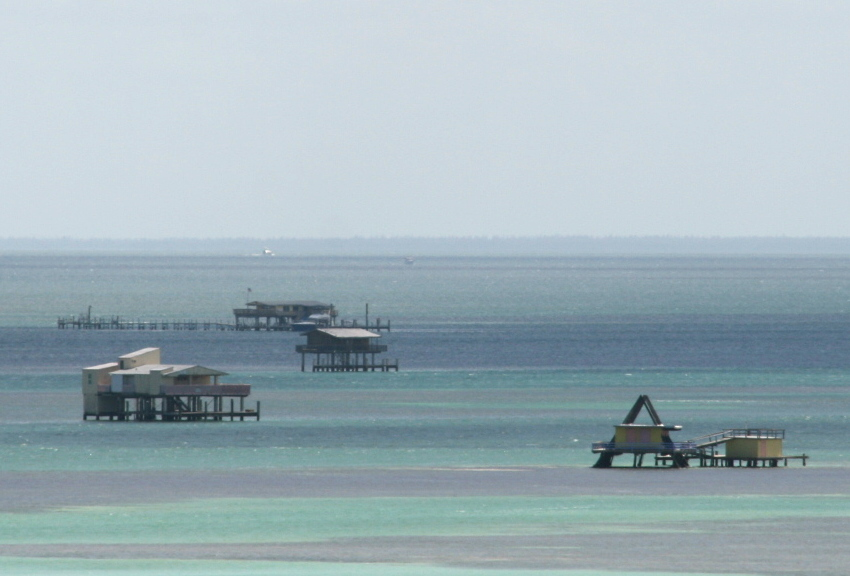
View from the Cape Florida Light

Stiltsville is a group of wood stilt houses located one mile south of Cape Florida, on sand banks of the Safety Valve on the edge of Biscayne Bay in Miami-Dade County, Florida. The structures stand on wood or reinforced concrete pilings, generally ten feet above the shallow water, which varies from one to three feet deep at low tide.

== History ==
Most sources claim the first stilt shack was built in the early 1930s, but some Dade County historians say that there were a dozen shacks in "the flats" as early as 1922.

=== Crawfish Eddie ===
"Crawfish" Eddie Walker built a shack on stilts above the water in 1933, toward the end of the prohibition era, allegedly to facilitate gambling, which was legal at one mile offshore. Crawfish Eddie sold bait and beer from his shack and was known for a dish he called chilau, a crawfish chowder made with crawfish he caught under his shack. Thomas Grady and Leo Edward, two of Eddie's fishing buddies, built their own shack in 1937. Shipwrecking and channel dredging brought many people to the area and more shacks were constructed, some by boating and fishing clubs. Local newspapers called the area "the shacks" and "shack colony". Crawfish Eddie's original shack was destroyed by the late-season Hurricane King of 1950.

Calvert Club at Stiltsville

=== Calvert Club ===
The first social club built at Stiltsville was constructed during the late 1930s and named the Calvert Club. The Miami Beach Rod & Reel Club was organized in 1929 and held its first official outing at the Stiltsville Calvert Club in August 1938. A club picture was taken in front of the club, which was popular enough to have picture postcards printed with its image.

=== Quarterdeck Club ===
The Quarterdeck Club, built on a barge by Commodore Edward Turner, opened in November, 1940. The club gained popularity after an article about the club appeared in Life magazine on February 10, 1941. The article noted that this was an "extraordinary American community dedicated solely to sunlight, salt water and the well-being of the human spirit." The club was described as "a $100,000 play-palace equipped with bar, lounge, bridge deck, dining room and dock slips for yachts".

The local newspapers began running stories and photographs of parties with celebrities. The Quarterdeck Club was viewed by tourists as a "must see" attraction at Miami Beach, Florida.

Rumors of gambling persisted, and the club was raided in 1949, but no evidence of gambling was found. Hotelman Warren Freeman purchased the club in 1950 and envisioned it as a high-class operation. The structure was renovated and expanded, only to be heavily damaged by Hurricane King late in the season. Dejected and broke, Freeman sold what remained.

The club was rebuilt, but never regained the popularity of its early years. Hurricane Donna in 1960 damaged most of the structures in Stiltsville, including the Quarterdeck Club, then the building was completely destroyed by a fire in 1961 that burned all the way to the pilings. The rumor was that the owner's wife set fire to the club after a jealous fit. Karl Mongelluzzo, the last owner of the Quarterdeck Club, was denied a building permit in 1967.

=== Party Central ===
Stiltsville may not have looked like much, but in the 1940s and 1950s, it was a popular place where lawyers, bankers, politicians, and other moneyed, well-connected Miamians came to drink, relax and kick back. Law enforcement periodically visited the area, looking for vice activities.

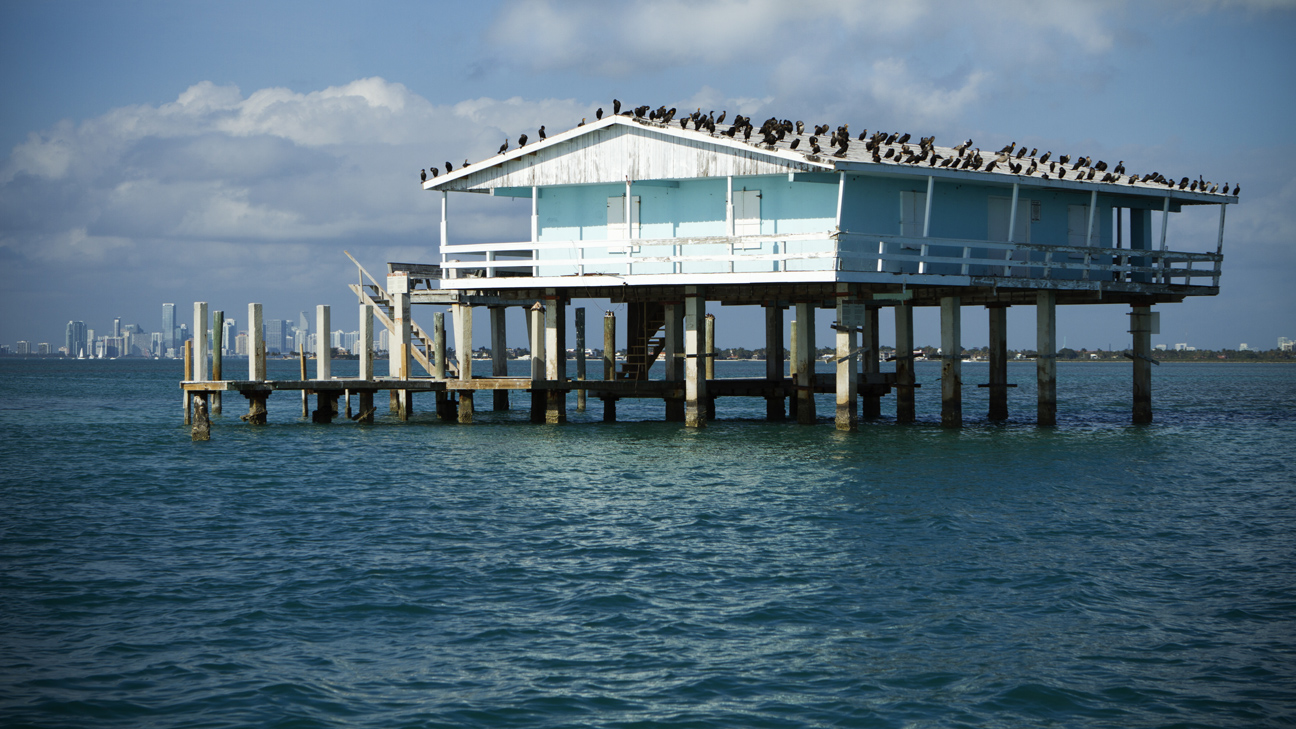
Jimmy Ellenburg house

Florida Governor LeRoy Collins was a frequent visitor during the 1950s, a guest of Jimmy Ellenburg at his house in the flats. Ellenburg established his barge near Crawfish Eddie's in 1939 and was known as the unofficial mayor of Stiltsville. A handwritten note from the governor to his host read: "Jimmy Ellenburg, When the time comes when I say so long to this life, I hope the great beyond seems alot [sic] like your cabin in the sea - Roy Collins"

From the 1950s to the 1960s, Stiltsville's style matured from ramshackle to lodge, some with architectural styles, including the "A-frame" house; the Leshaw House, with its distinctive Mansard roof; and the uniquely shaped Baldwin & Kelley House, which was featured in a national ad campaign for Pittsburgh Paints. These three houses, as well as the Ellenburg house, were among the seven buildings included in the 2003 Stiltsville Trust. Nearly all of the structures included full wrap-around porches. At its peak in 1960, Stiltsville consisted of 27 buildings.

=== Miami Springs Power Boat Club ===
In the late 1950s, twelve blue-collar workers in the Miami Springs Power Boat Club purchased a sunken barge for $1, re-floated it and towed it to Stiltsville, where they grounded it on a mudflat and built a structure and docks for use by their club. Hurricane Betsy did considerable damage to the barge in 1965, so club members invested in concrete pilings, which still remain in place. Thousands have visited the Springs House over the years, including Boy Scout troops and Optimist Clubs. Several television commercials have also been filmed there. It was one of the seven remaining structures named in the Stiltsville Trust of 2003.

=== Bikini Club ===
In 1962, a businessman/scam artist named Harry Churchville, also known as "Pierre," grounded a 150-foot yacht named Jeff in the mudflats of Stiltsville and turned the boat into a social club. Alcoholic beverages were offered for sale, with free drinks to women wearing bikinis. There was a sun deck for nude sunbathing and staterooms could be rented for any purpose. The Bikini Club was raided by the Florida Beverage Commission in the summer of 1965, and closed down for selling liquor without a license. On September 8, 1965, Hurricane Betsy destroyed most of Stiltsville and severely damaged the boats upon which the Bikini Club was based. In 1966, what remained of the Bikini Club burned to the waterline.

The May 1967 edition of Argosy featured a picture story titled "BIKINIS ON STILTS," written by Ward Kennedy. The introductory quote stated, "Off Key Biscayne is a renegade village on stilts where weekend residents live by their own laws. Their town hall is a floating Bikini Club that swings both day and night." By the time the story was published, the Bikini Club had been gone for over a year.

=== Radio tower ===
AM radio station WRIZ constructed radio towers in Stiltsville in 1967, on the south side of the Biscayne Channel. It became radio station WRHC in 1985, and used the Stiltsville towers for daytime broadcasting at 10,000 watts on 1550 kHz, until the site was decommissioned in approximately 1990. Because salt water is highly conductive, it makes an excellent ground plane for signals in the mediumwave radio band, which allowed the station a greater broadcast range on the same power.

== Regulation ==
Stiltsville's frontier era ended with Hurricane Betsy in 1965. Beginning in August 1965, the state of Florida required building owners to pay $100 annually to lease their quarter-acre circular "campsites." No permits for new construction were issued, and structures that sustained more than 50-percent damage could not be rebuilt. Building codes were implemented and the state banned commercial operations after 1969.

=== Lease renewals ===
In 1976, the state renewed leases for $300 annually but included an expiration date of July 1, 1999. A clause in the lease stated that structures remaining after that date would be removed at the owner's expense.

Congress expanded the Biscayne National Park boundaries in June 1980, bringing the area containing Stiltsville within the park. The state of Florida deeded the submerged lands in the expansion area to the United States in 1985. The Park Service agreed to honor the terms of the existing leases, so nothing really changed.

At the beginning of 1992, there were 14 "campsites" with structures present at Stiltsville. After Hurricane Andrew struck on August 24, 1992, only seven buildings survived and were still standing by July 1, 1999.

=== Deadline for lease renewals ===
As the lease termination date approached, the leaseholders requested renewals. In the mid-1990s, the park service told leaseholders it lacked the authority to renew leases and suggested they pursue a listing on the National Register of Historic Places. Several preservation groups took up the cause, but Stiltsville twice failed to earn National Register status, primarily because the surviving houses weren't 50 years old.

Dr. Paul George, historian for the Historical Museum of Southern Florida, explained the significance of Stiltsville thus: "It really is an only-in-Miami kind of thing. It had an aura, a rascally mischievous past. But it was also just a place people could go to enjoy getting away. It would be a terrible loss."

Life magazine featured another article on Stiltsville, 57 years after the original. The November 1998 issue included an article entitled, "Stiltsville: The residents of a fading Florida community make a stand to save it." Jason Fulford was credited for the photography.

=== Petition ===
In a last-ditch effort, a petition drive was started.

The response from the community was overwhelming. More than 75,000 people asked that Stiltsville be spared, and the park service reversed their decision. In August 2000, the Park Service announced the approval of a Stiltsville amendment to the 1983 General Management Plan for Biscayne National Park. Under the revised plan, the houses would not be demolished and the existing leases would be extended while a preservation plan was developed.

== Stiltsville Trust ==
In 2003, a non-profit organization called the Stiltsville Trust was established and included the seven remaining leaseholders, called caretakers, and eight members of the community. In addition to raising funds, their goal was to preserve and rehabilitate the structures to help showcase the park's marine resources with support for educational and interpretive services. Possible uses included community meeting space, a visitor center, research facilities, an artist in residence program and a satellite National Park Service office in the northern part of the park.

The park service added hurricane strapping to protect the structures from wind damage in major storms. Caretakers still perform basic maintenance on their former weekend retreats, but the Stiltsville buildings are owned by the National Park Service and have been secured and posted with "no trespassing" signs. Access to the buildings by non-trust members is by permission of the park's superintendent.

The Park Service hopes the Stiltsville Trust will alleviate one of Biscayne National Park's problems: the facility is 95-percent water and essentially inaccessible to non-boaters. According to park superintendent Linda Canzanelli,

"A lot of people hear about Biscayne National Park because of Stiltsville. It can be a wonderful educational tool if we can get people out there so we can talk about the local history and marine environment."

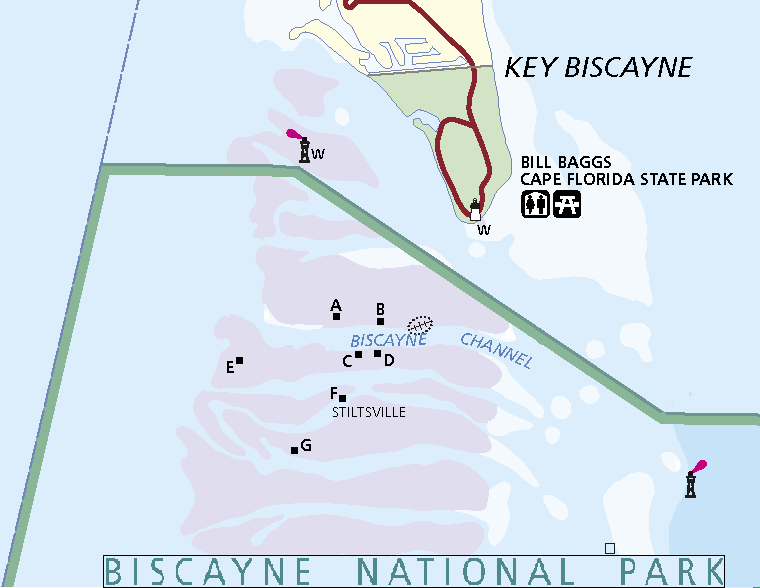
Stiltsville area of Biscayne National Park

=== Remaining houses ===
Seven houses remained in Stiltsville after Hurricane Andrew passed through the area in August 1992 and were included in the Stiltsville Trust when it was formed in 2005. The Leshaw House (D on the map) burned in January 2011. As of 2021, six houses remained in Stiltsville.

- Jimmy Ellenburg House (A on map)
- A-Frame House (B)
- Baldwin House (C)
- Bay Chateau (E)
- Hicks House (F)
- Powerboat Club (G)

== Popular culture ==
Stiltsville has been the setting for scenes in numerous media works, such as:

Films

The made-for-TV movie The Fantastic Seven (1979), and the films Around the World Under the Sea (1966), Absence of Malice (1981), Bad Boys II (2003) and Reminiscence (2021).

Games

Stiltsville is depicted in the video games Grand Theft Auto: Vice City (2002), in the fictional city based on Miami called "Vice City", as well as in the 2006 PSP game Miami Vice: The Game (based on the film of the same name), and in Driv3r (2004), which features Miami as one of the settings.

Literature

Les Standiford's novel, Done Deal; three Carl Hiaasen novels: Skin Tight, Stormy Weather, and Skinny Dip; A J Stewart's novel, Crash Tack; Susanna Daniel's novels, Stiltsville: a Novel and Sea Creatures; Tim Dorsey's novel Pineapple Grenade, and Karen Russell's novel, Swamplandia!

Television

Stiltsville is depicted in the television series Dexter, Miami Vice and Sea Hunt.

== See also ==
- Cape Romano Dome House
- Sacramento–San Joaquin River Delta
- Stilt house
