= WRHC (AM) =

Simulcasts WWFE Miami
- Coral Gables, Florida; United States
- Broadcast area: Miami metropolitan area
- Frequency: 1550 kHz
- Branding: AM 1550 The Word

Programming
- Format: Christian radio

Ownership
- Owner: Salem Media Group; (Hispanos Communications, LLC)
- Sister stations: WWFE; WMYM

History
- Former call signs: WRIZ (1960-1974)
- Call sign meaning: Radio Habana Cuba

Technical information
- Licensing authority: FCC
- Facility ID: 73945
- Class: B
- Power: 1,000 watts day 100 watts night
- Transmitter coordinates: 25°51′27″N 80°28′52″W
- Translator: 98.7 W254DV (Miami)

Links
- Public license information: Public file; LMS
- Webcast: Listen Live
- Website: thewordmiami.com

WRHC (1550 kHz) is an AM radio station with a Christian radio radio format, simulcasting WWFE. Licensed to serve Coral Gables, Florida, United States, the station reaches the Miami metropolitan area. The station is currently owned by Salem Media Group.

The station's name and broadcast callsign are an homage to the former Cuban radio network, RHC-Cadena Azul, which operated from 1939 until 1954.

== History ==
Following an application filed in 1959 by the Sioux Broadcasting Corporation, headed by attorney Robert H. Peterson, the station was first licensed as WRIZ. It had a phased array of four radio towers in Stiltsville south of Key Biscayne from 1967 to 1990. Because salt water is highly conductive, it makes an excellent ground plane for signals in the mediumwave radio band, allowing the station to travel farther on the same power, although this station's purpose was to put a strong signal across Miami while minimizing its signal toward the Bahamas Islands and a station on 1540. As with all medium-frequency stations, the towers themselves were mast radiators, connected to the transmitter shack via transmission lines, held in this case a few feet above the water level by pilings.

Former logo

In 1974, the call letters were changed to WRHC, derived from "Radio Habana Cuba". On June 6, 2025, the station changed formats from Spanish talk to Christian radio, branded as "The Word".
