= WWFE =

Coordinates: 25°51′28.3″N 80°28′51.2″W

- Miami, Florida; United States
- Broadcast area: Miami-Fort Lauderdale
- Frequency: 670 kHz
- Branding: AM 670 The Word

Programming
- Format: Christian radio

Ownership
- Owner: Salem Media Group; (Hispanos Communications, LLC)
- Sister stations: WMYM; WRHC

History
- First air date: July 1989

Technical information
- Licensing authority: FCC
- Facility ID: 21391
- Class: B
- Power: 50,000 watts (day); 1,000 watts (night)
- Translator: 103.1 W276DV (Miami)
- Repeater: 1550 WRHC (Coral Gables)

Links
- Public license information: Public file; LMS
- Webcast: Listen live
- Website: thewordmiami.com

WWFE (670 AM, "The Word") is a commercial radio station licensed to Miami, Florida, United States, and broadcasting to the Miami-Fort Lauderdale area. Owned by Salem Media Group, WWFE has a Christian radio format, with studios and offices are on SW 27th Avenue in Miami. WWFE broadcasts from a directional antenna at all times, with a six-tower array used at night.

Former logo

In July 1989, WWFE signed on the air.

Effective January 10, 2023, WWFE was purchased by Salem Media Group along with WWFE’s FM translator W276DV (103.1), WRHC (1550) and its FM translator W254DV (98.7).

On June 6, 2025, Salem Media Group moved "La Nueva Poderosa" to WMYM and flipped to WWFE and its simulcast on WRHC to its Christian preaching format branded as "The Word".
