= KURS =

Radio station in San Diego, California

Coordinates: 32°41′39.2″N 117°7′20.1″W

- San Diego, California; United States
- Broadcast area: San Diego, California
- Frequency: 1040 kHz
- Branding: "ESNE Radio"

Programming
- Language: Spanish
- Format: Catholic radio

Ownership
- Owner: El Sembrador Ministries

History
- First air date: November 1, 1992

Technical information
- Licensing authority: FCC
- Facility ID: 54257
- Class: D
- Power: 360 watts day 61 watts night

Links
- Public license information: Public file; LMS
- Website: esneradio.com

KURS (1040 kHz) is an AM radio station broadcasting a Spanish-language Catholic radio format. The station is licensed to San Diego, California and is owned by El Sembrador Ministries. KURS is an affiliate of ESNE Radio. ESNE had been heard for five years in the San Diego area at its former home on KNSN 1240 AM from 2009 to September 29, 2014, when Donald Crawford's Crawford Broadcasting and its licensee Kiertron, Inc. purchased KNSN. Prior to becoming a ESNE Radio station, KURS had broadcast a Gospel Music format.

1040 AM is a clear channel frequency reserved for Class A WHO in Des Moines, Iowa, so KURS must restrict its power to 360 watts by day, and 61 watts at night.
