= 1040 AM =

AM radio frequency

The following radio stations broadcast on AM frequency 1040 kHz: 1040 AM is a United States clear-channel frequency. WHO Des Moines is the dominant station on 1040 AM.

== In Argentina ==
- LRG203 Antena in Santa Rosa

== In Canada ==
Call sign	City of license	Daytime power (kW)	Nighttime power (kW)	Transmitter coordinates
CKST	Vancouver, British Columbia	50	50	49.092431°N 122.932388°W

== In Mexico ==
- XEBBB-AM in Santa Ana Tepetitlan, Jalisco
- XEPLE-AM in Palenque, Chiapas
- XESAG-AM in Salamanca, Guanajuato

== In the United States ==
Stations in bold are clear-channel stations.

Call sign	City of license	Facility ID	Class	Daytime power (kW)	Nighttime power (kW)	Critical hours power (kW)	Transmitter coordinates
KGGR	Dallas, Texas	8099	D	3.3		2.8	32.778611°N 96.730833°W
KLHT	Honolulu, Hawaii	8415	B	10	10		21.335°N 157.893611°W
KPPF	Monument, Colorado	10846	D	15		2	38.818889°N 104.775556°W
KURS	San Diego, California	54257	D	0.36	0.061		32.694167°N 117.121389°W
KXPD	Tigard, Oregon	18859	D	2.2	0.2		45.473889°N 122.659167°W
WCHR	Flemington, New Jersey	28130	B	15	1.5	7.5	40.505°N 74.976667°W
WHBO	Pinellas Park, Florida	41383	B	3.6	0.42		27.847222°N 82.7725°W
**WHO**	Des Moines, Iowa	51331	A	50	50		41.652778°N 93.350278°W
WJBE	Powell, Tennessee	59693	D	10		3	36.042778°N 84.0475°W
WLCR	Mount Washington, Kentucky	58742	D	1.5			38.003056°N 85.680833°W
WNVI	Moca, Puerto Rico	17074	B	9	0.25		18.277222°N 67.166944°W
WPBS	Conyers, Georgia	42070	D	50		5.5	33.680833°N 84.028889°W
WSGH	Lewisville, North Carolina	72967	D	1.1			36.135°N 80.503889°W
WURN	Miami, Florida	4341	B	50	5		25.842778°N 80.42°W
WYSL	Avon, New York	54665	B	27	0.5	10	42.854444°N 77.710833°W
