= WLVJ (AM) =

Radio station in Florida, United States

- Boynton Beach, Florida; United States
- Broadcast area: West Palm Beach area
- Frequency: 1020 kHz
- Branding: Radio Levanjil

Programming
- Language: Haitian

Ownership
- Owner: Actualidad Media Group; (Actualidad Licensee 1020 AM, LLC)
- Sister stations: WURN; WURN-FM

History
- First air date: November 3, 1995 (as WAOP)
- Former call signs: WAOP (1995); WRBF (1995–2001); WRHB (2001–2008); WURN (2008–2016)

Technical information
- Licensing authority: FCC
- Facility ID: 3607
- Class: B
- Power: 4,700 watts day; 1,500 watts night
- Transmitter coordinates: 26°28′27.3″N 80°12′10.2″W
- Translators: 97.5 W248CK (Twentymile Bend); 103.9 W280DU (Boca Raton)

Links
- Public license information: Public file; LMS

WLVJ (1020 kHz) is a commercial AM radio station licensed to Boynton Beach, Florida, and serving the West Palm Beach radio market. The station airs a Haitian Creole radio format. WLVJ is owned by Actualidad Media Group.

The weekday schedule is made up of all news blocks along with talk programs in the daytime and sports shows in the evening. Some hours, the station carries the audio from CNN en Español.

WLVJ is powered at 4,700 watts by day. Because AM 1020 is a clear channel frequency, reserved for Class A station KDKA in Pittsburgh, WLVJ must reduce power at night to 1,500 watts, when AM radio waves travel further. The station uses a directional antenna at all times. The transmitter is off U.S. Route 441 (State Route 7) in Delray Beach, Florida.

== History ==
The station went on the air as WAOP on November 3, 1995. On December 1, 1995, the station changed its call sign to WRBF, on February 1, 2001, to WRHB, on November 5, 2008, to WURN, and on December 6, 2016, to the current WLVJ.

In 2017, Actualidad Radio flipped the frequencies of WLVJ and WURN. WLVJ moved to AM 1020 and WURN moved to AM 1040.
