= WURN-FM =

- Key Largo, Florida; United States
- Broadcast area: Miami metropolitan area
- Frequency: 107.1 MHz (HD Radio)
- Branding: Exitos 107.1 FM

Programming
- Language: Spanish
- Format: Adult contemporary

Ownership
- Owner: Actualidad Media Group; (Actualidad Key Largo FM Licensee, LLC)
- Sister stations: WURN; WLVJ

History
- First air date: July 17, 2014

Technical information
- Licensing authority: FCC
- Facility ID: 189568
- Class: C2
- ERP: 50,000 watts
- HAAT: 145 meters (476 ft)
- Transmitter coordinates: 25°16′1.4″N 80°26′15.2″W

Links
- Public license information: Public file; LMS
- Website: www.exitos107.com

WURN-FM (107.1 MHz) is a radio station broadcasting a Spanish-language adult contemporary format. Licensed to Key Largo, Florida, United States, the station serves the Miami metropolitan area. The station is owned by Actualidad Media Group.
