= WURN (AM) =

- Miami, Florida; United States
- Broadcast area: South Florida
- Frequency: 1040 kHz
- Branding: Actualidad 1040 AM / 103.9 FM

Programming
- Language: Spanish
- Format: News/talk
- Affiliations: CNN en Español

Ownership
- Owner: Actualidad Media Group; (Actualidad 1040 AM Licensee, LLC)
- Sister stations: WLVJ; WURN-FM

History
- First air date: 1973
- Former call signs: WKAO (197?-1986); WYFX (1986–1996); WJNA (1996–1997); WJNO (1997–2000); WBZT (2000); WJNA (2000–2003); WLVJ (2003–2016)
- Former frequencies: 1510 kHz (197?–198?)
- Call sign meaning: Union Radio Noticias

Technical information
- Licensing authority: FCC
- Facility ID: 4341
- Class: B
- Power: 50,000 watts (day; 5,000 watts (night)
- Transmitter coordinates: 25°50′35.4″N 80°25′11.2″W
- Translator: 103.9 W280FV (Miami)

Links
- Public license information: Public file; LMS
- Webcast: Listen live
- Website: actualidadradio.com

WURN (1040 kHz "Actualidad 1040 AM / 103.9 FM") is a commercial AM radio station in Miami, Florida. The station airs a Spanish news/talk radio format. WURN is owned by Actualidad Media Group.

The weekday schedule is made up of all news blocks along with talk programs in the daytime and sports shows in the evening. Some hours, the station carries the audio from CNN en Español.

WURN transmits with 50,000 watts by day, the maximum for commercial AM stations. Because AM 1040 is a clear channel frequency, reserved for Class A WHO Des Moines, WURN must reduce power at night to 5,000 watts, when AM radio waves travel further. The station uses a directional antenna in the daytime. The transmitter is off NW 74th Street in Miami. Programming is also heard on 99-watt FM translator W280FV at 103.9 MHz in Miami.

During the 2020 election, some programs on WURN promoted falsehoods and conspiracy theories.

== History ==
Boynton Beach's first AM radio station was WZZZ, which broadcast with a Top 40 format on 1510 kHz and signed on the air April 10, 1962. WZZZ went off the air in September 1965. It was eventually replaced by a newly licensed station on 1510 using the call sign WKAO. In the 1980s WKAO moved to 1040 kHz. WKAO changed its call letters to WYFX on May 3, 1986. Subsequently the station changed its call sign to WJNA on November 1, 1996, to WJNO on September 22, 1997, to WBZT on March 6, 2000, back to WJNA on December 20, 2000, and to WLVJ on January 7, 2003.

In June 1988, the station found its nighttime signal being subsumed by from 1040 AM "Radio Taino" in Cuba, which may have been increasing its signal strength to as much as 250,000 watts. WHBO 1040 in the Tampa radio market also experienced signal inference from Radio Taino.

On January 24, 2012, the Federal Communications Commission (FCC) approved the transfer of the station's broadcast license from James-Crystal Radio's subsidiary, JCE Licenses LLC, to a company known as Actualidad 1040AM Licensee, LLC.

On April 26, 2016, WURN was granted a construction permit to change its city of license from Boynton Beach to Miami, increase day power to 50,000 watts, increase night power to 5,000 watts and move the transmitter to the same site as WMYM. WURN was issued a license for this change effective February 9, 2018.

In effect, on December 16, 2016, WURN and its co-owned station, WLVJ, flipped frequencies. WURN moved from AM 1020 to AM 1040. WLVJ did the reverse, moving from AM 1040 to AM 1020.

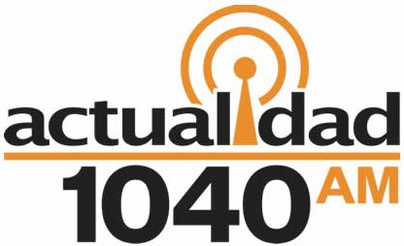
Logo before translator sign on
